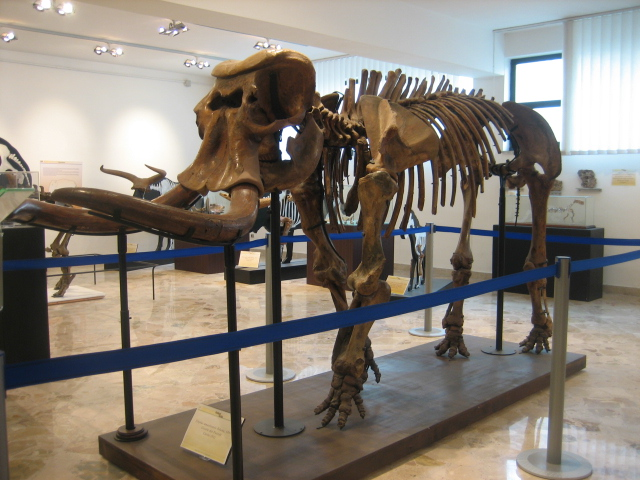
- Skeleton of P. cf. mnaidriensis in Palermo, Sicily

Scientific classification
- Kingdom: Animalia
- Phylum: Chordata
- Class: Mammalia
- Order: Proboscidea
- Family: Elephantidae
- Genus: †Palaeoloxodon
- Species: †P. mnaidriensis

Binomial name
- †Palaeoloxodon mnaidriensis (Adams, 1874)

Synonyms
- Elephas mnaidriensis Adams, 1874

= Palaeoloxodon mnaidriensis =

Palaeoloxodon mnaidriensis Temporal range: Middle-Late Pleistocene

Extinct species of elephant

Palaeoloxodon mnaidriensis is an extinct species of dwarf elephant belonging to the genus Palaeoloxodon, with remains attributed to the species from both Malta and Sicily during the Middle Pleistocene and Late Pleistocene. It is derived from the European mainland straight-tusked elephant (Palaeoloxodon antiquus). There is confusion about what remains should be attributed to the species, with a number of authors arguing that the Sicilian remains should be treated as a separate species.

== Taxonomy and evolution ==
Palaeoloxodon mnaidriensis was first named in 1874 based on material from Mnaidra gap in Malta by Andrew Leith Adams in 1874 as Elephas mnaidriensis. The lectotype of the species is the molar tooth NHM 44304, from Mnaidra gap. The species continued to be treated as a species of Elephas by later authors (who sometimes synonymised it with the species "Elephas melitensis" previously named from Maltese material) until a 1942 posthumous publication by Henry Fairfield Osborn, which considered it a member of the genus Palaeoloxodon. Later 20th century authors again considered the species a member of the genus Elephas, but by the 2000s its placement as a member of the genus Palaeoloxodon was generally accepted.

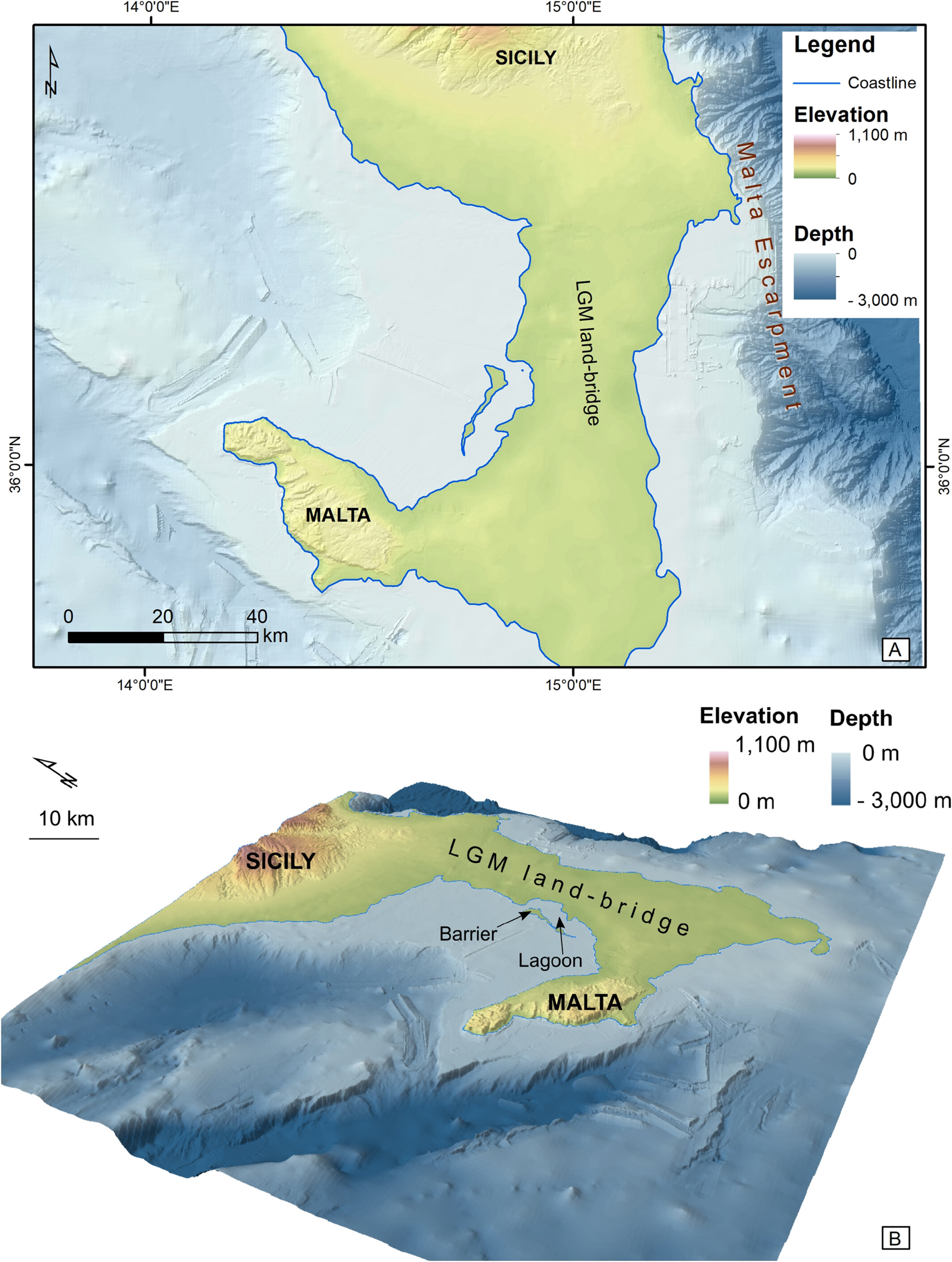
Map of the land bridge between Sicily and Malta formed during glaciation induced episodes of low sea level, as exhibited in the Last Glacial Maximum.

The temporal range of dwarf elephant material on Malta, including that of P. mnaidriensis, is poorly constrained, though almost certainly sometime during the Middle Pleistocene or Late Pleistocene. The evolutionary history of P. mnaidriensis on Malta is unclear, and it is possible that not all remains attributed to P. mnaidriensis on the island belong to the same species, with the species possibly being a wastebin to which all moderately dwarfed Sicilian-Maltese dwarf elephants have been attributed, with at least some molar teeth attributed to P. mnaidriensis from Għar Dalam cave on Malta having been found to be morphologically distinct from material attributed to P. mnaidriensis at other Maltese sites. Regardless of true relationships, all remains attributed to P. mnaidriensis are thought to ultimately descend from the continental European straight-tusked elephant (Palaeoloxodon antiquus), with the ancestors of the elephants first dispersing from southern Italy to Sicily and then from Sicily to Malta, with the distance between Sicily and Malta being greatly reduced during glacial periods due to the presence of a submarine plateau between Sicily and Malta that was exposed as dry land due to glacier-induced sea level lowering.

While historically considered to have inhabited both Malta and Sicily, remains from Sicily are suggested to belong to a separate species, provisionally referred to as P. cf. mnaidriensis or P. ex gr. mnaidriensis. P. cf. mnaidriensis descended from a colonisation of Sicily by the straight-tusked elephant from mainland Italy during the late Middle Pleistocene, at earliest around 200,000 years ago, and probably by around 160,000 years ago, which replaced the even smaller, less than 1 metre (3 ft 3 in)-tall Palaeoloxodon falconeri, which had descended from a separate colonisation of Sicily by P. antiquus several hundred thousand years prior. Some of the Palaeoloxodon "mnaidriensis" remains from Għar Dalam may be the same species as the Sicilian P. cf. mnaidriensis, though other material from the cave may represent true P. mnaidriensis.

The elephant species native to Malta and Sicily had reduced in body size as a result of insular dwarfism, a common phenomenon resulting from the colonisation of islands by large mammals. The much smaller body size of P. cf. mnaidriensis compared to P. antiquus, in combination with the relatively short period of time between colonisation and small body size suggests that the rate of dwarfism was relatively rapid.

== Description ==
Maltese dwarf elephants including P. mnaidriensis are generally only known from fragmentary skeletal remains. P. mnaidriensis proper from Malta was considerably smaller than P. cf. mnaidriensis from Sicily, based on the dimensions of its molar teeth, though larger than P. falconeri. The Sicilian P. cf. mnaidriensis has nearly 90% body size reduction compared to its straight-tusked elephant ancestor, with one estimate giving a shoulder height of about 1.8 m (5 ft 11 in) and a mean body weight of about 1,100 kg (2,400 lb) for specimens from Puntali Cave. Another estimate gives a shoulder height of 2 m (6 ft 7 in) and a weight of 1,700 kg (3,700 lb), which is comparable to the size of an African forest elephant. Like P. antiquus the head of Sicilian P. cf. mnaidriensis has a well developed parieto-occipital crest at the top of the skull. The teeth of Sicilian P. cf. mnaidriensis around 30% the size of those of P. antiquus. Relative to P. antiquus, the enamel of the teeth of Sicilian P. cf. mnaidriensis is thicker, and the density of lamellae on the teeth is higher, with the number of plates being slightly lower than those of the molars of P. antiquus. The limb bones of Sicilian P. cf. mnaidriensis are proportionally more robust than those of P. antiquus.

== Paleobiology and paleoecology ==
At most sites on Malta (excluding Ghar Dalam and possibly Gandia Fissure) dwarf elephants including P. mnaidriensis represent the only large herbivores. At these sites, remains attributed to P. mnaidriensis proper (including those from the type Mnaidra gap locality) have been found associated with much smaller dwarf elephants belonging to Palaeoloxodon falconeri (though this may indicate time averaging rather than contemporaneity), giant dormice belonging to the genus Leithia (which contains the largest dormice ever) and Maltamys, giant tortoises (Solitudo robusta) and giant swans (Cygnus falconeri) as well as other birds like cranes (Grus) and raptors. In the Bone Breccia of Ghar Dalam dating to prior to 165,900 years ago, remains of P. mnaidriensis along with those of P. falconeri are associated with those of hippopotamuses (Hippopotamus melitensis and Hippopotamus pentlandi), red deer (or an endemic species derived from red deer) and possibly equines. In the later "Lower Red Earth" layer, at Ghar Dalam dating to approximately 167,300 to 151,200 years ago, remains of P. mnaidriensis (though not P. falconeri) are associated with those of bears (probably brown bears), wolves and red foxes, along with Hippopotamus pentlandi and red deer or endemic offshoots of that species. At Gandia Fissure P. mnaidriensis may be associated with hippopotamuses, but this is uncertain.

The appearance of P. cf. mnaidriensis on Sicily around 160-200,000 years ago was part of a faunal turnover where the depauperate endemic fauna that characterised Sicily during the early mid-Middle Pleistocene (including species like Palaeoloxodon falconeri and Leithia) was profoundly altered due to the tectonic uplift of Calabria and northeast Sicily around 200,000 years ago, greatly reducing the distance between Sicily and the Italian mainland, causing the arrival of some large mammals from the continental fauna of mainland Italy, including both predators (cave lions, cave hyenas, brown bears and wolves) and large herbivores (wild boar, red deer, fallow deer, steppe bison, aurochs, European wild ass, and the hippo Hippopotamus pentlandi) which coexisted with P. cf. mnaidriensis. The larger body size of P. cf. mnaidriensis in comparison to P. falconeri is suggested to be as a result of needing to defend against predators, as well as due to the presence of other competing herbivores. Evidence has been found for at least the scavenging of the remains of P. cf. mnaidriensis by cave hyenas.

Dental wear (microwear and mesowear) analysis suggests that Sicilian P. cf. mnaidriensis had a predominantly grazing based diet, which may represent an adaption to living in open grassland habitats, as well as niche partitioning with the other contemporaneous large herbivores that lived on the island.

== Extinction ==
The timing of extinction of P. mnaidriensis on Malta cannot be definitively constrained, though it has been suggested that the youngest remains of dwarf elephants in Ghar Dalam cave are from the "Lower Red Earth" layer, around 167,300 to 151,200 years old, and that elephants are absent from fossil deposits on the islands younger than around 80,000 years ago (including the "Upper Red Earth" and younger strata at Ghar Dalam), suggesting they were extinct by this time.

The youngest records of Sicilian P. cf./ ex gr. mnaidriensis are from what is now the island of Favignana off the coast of western Sicily dating to around 20,000 years ago, during the Last Glacial Maximum (though this date is likely to be a minimum age), which was connected to mainland Sicily for most of the Last Glacial Period due to lowered sea levels, as well as San Teodoro Cave in northeast Sicily, which dates to sometime after 32,000 years ago (other potential records have been indirectly dated to around 21-23,000 calibrated years Before Present based on association with dated European wild ass remains). These individuals are estimated to have had a shoulder height of roughly 1.5 metres (4.9 ft), somewhat smaller than other described individuals of P. cf./ ex gr. mnaidriensis. These records pre-date the earliest evidence of human presence on Sicily around 16,500 years ago.

== See also ==
- Dwarf elephant
