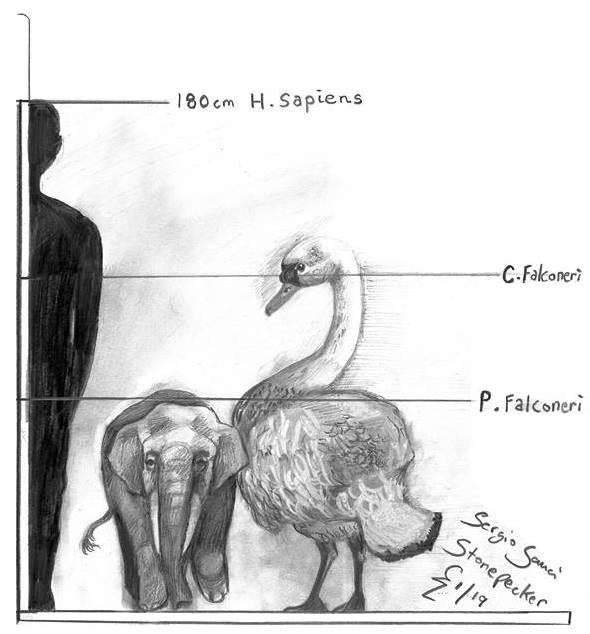
- Reconstruction of Cygnus falconeri and the Sicilian-Maltese dwarf elephant Palaeoloxodon falconeri and a human for scale

Scientific classification
- Kingdom: Animalia
- Phylum: Chordata
- Class: Aves
- Order: Anseriformes
- Family: Anatidae
- Genus: Cygnus
- Species: C. falconeri

Binomial name
- Cygnus falconeri Parker, 1865

= Cygnus falconeri =

Giant swan Temporal range: Middle Pleistocene

Extinct species of bird

Cygnus falconeri is an extinct species of very large swan known from Middle Pleistocene-aged deposits from Malta and Sicily. Its dimensions are described as exceeding those of the living mute swan by one-third, which would give a bill-to-tail length of about 190–210 cm (75–83 in) (based on 145–160 cm for C. olor). By comparison to the bones of living swans, it can be estimated that it weighed around 16 kg (35 lb) and had a wingspan of about 3 m (9.8 ft). Due to its size, it may have been flightless.

Its remains on Malta are associated with dwarf elephants (the smaller Palaeoloxodon falconeri and the larger Palaeoloxodon mnaidriensis), giant dormice (Leithia, including the largest dormouse ever, the rabbit-sized L. melitensis and the smaller L. cartei and Maltamys gollcheri), the giant tortoise Solitudo robusta and other birds, including raptors and members of the crane genus Grus. On Sicily, its remains are associated with the "Elephas mnaidriensis" faunal complex, including carnivores like cave hyenas, cave lions, grey wolves and brown bears, and herbivores like the large dwarf elephant Palaeoloxodon cf. mnaidriensis, wild boar, red deer, fallow deer, aurochs, steppe bison and the hippo Hippopotamus pentlandi, alongside numerous other bird species, most of which are still living.

Some remains of the species are displayed in Għar Dalam museum in Birżebbuġa, Malta.
