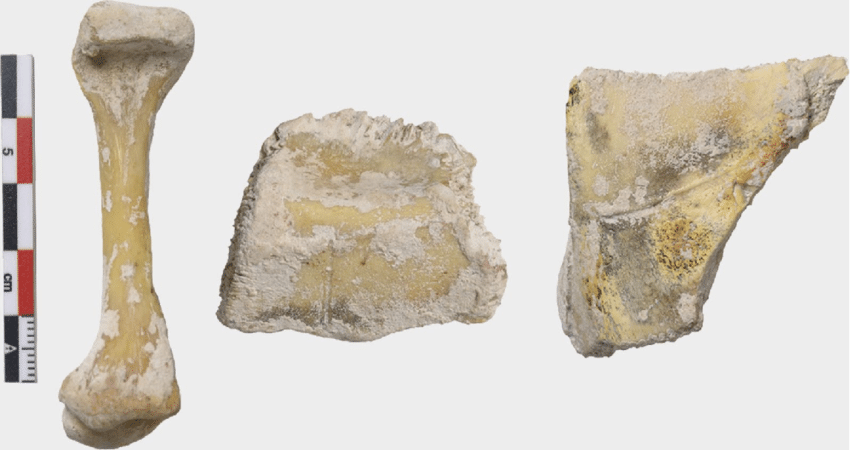

Scientific classification
- Kingdom: Animalia
- Phylum: Chordata
- Class: Reptilia
- Order: Testudines
- Suborder: Cryptodira
- Family: Testudinidae
- Genus: Centrochelys
- Species: †C. atlantica

Binomial name
- †Centrochelys atlantica (López-Jurado, Mateo, & García-Márquez 1998)

= Centrochelys atlantica =

Centrochelys atlantica Temporal range: Pleistocene

Species of extinct tortoise

Centrochelys atlantica is a putative extinct species of tortoise supposed to have lived in the Pleistocene recorded in the volcanic crater on Sal, Cape Verde. Tortoise fossils were described but not named from the crater in 1935. Four further bones from a private collector supposed to have been found in the same crater were described in 1998 as a new species similar to the extant Testudo calcarata (= Centrochelys sulcata), differentiated from C. sulcata by its smaller size and lesser robusticity.

However, Kehlmaier et al. (2021) identified the type material of this species as belonging to a specimen of the red-footed tortoise, making C. atlantica a junior synonym of the latter species. Radiocarbon dating also revealed that the bones were from an individual that lived between 1962 and 1974 rather than being fossils.

This leaves the extinct tortoise known from fossils excavated on the Sal Island in the 1930s currently without a scientific name. It does not seem there is any evidence this species came into contact with humans.
