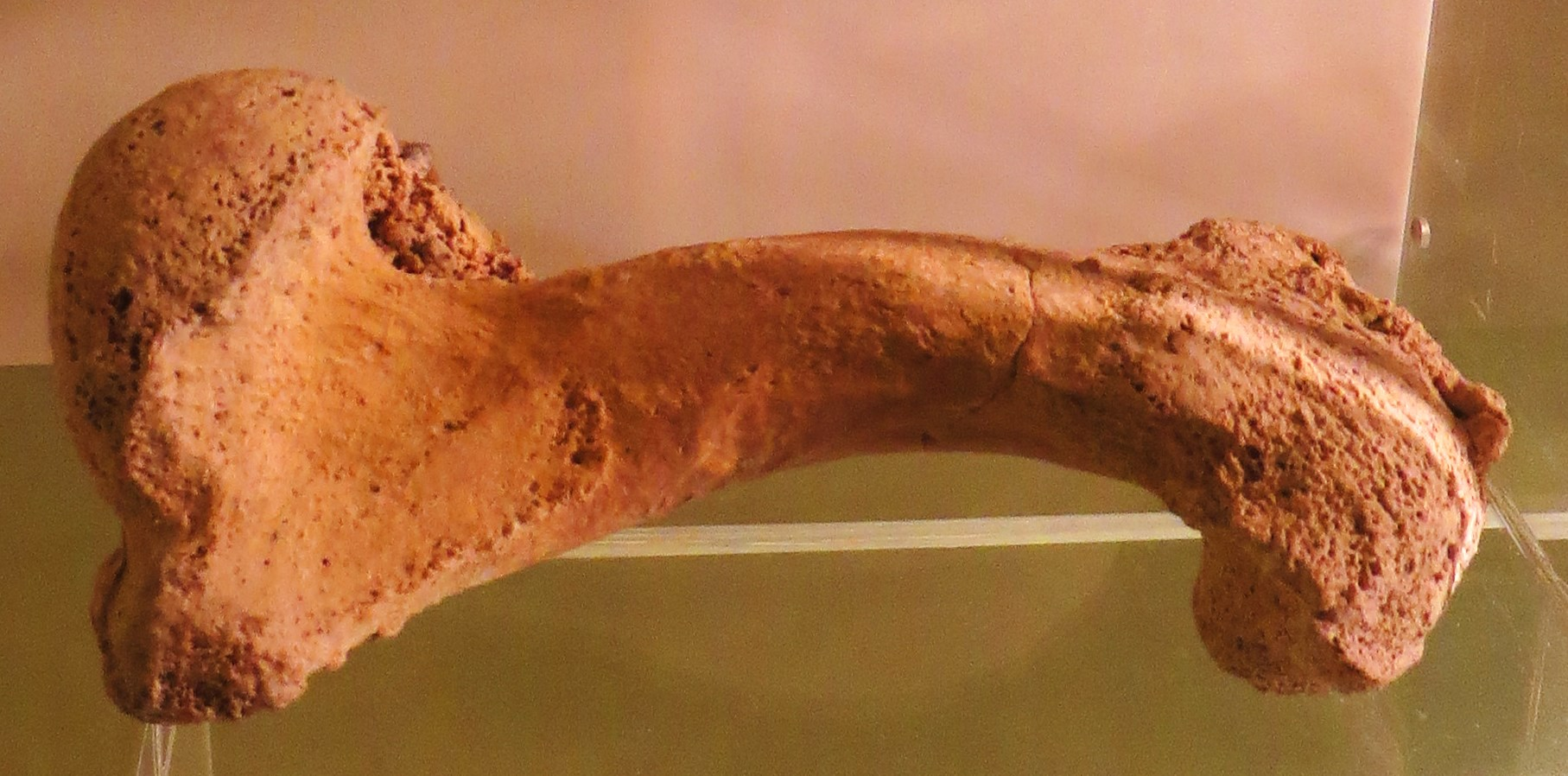
- Bone rest of Geochelone burchardi in Museo de la Naturaleza y el Hombre in Santa Cruz de Tenerife.

Scientific classification
- Kingdom: Animalia
- Phylum: Chordata
- Class: Reptilia
- Order: Testudines
- Suborder: Cryptodira
- Family: Testudinidae
- Genus: Centrochelys
- Species: †C. burchardi

Binomial name
- †Centrochelys burchardi (Ahl, 1926)

Synonyms
- Testudo burchardi Ahl, 1926; Geochelone burchardi (Ahl, 1926)

= Centrochelys burchardi =

Tenerife giant tortoise Temporal range: Middle Pleistocene

Extinct species of tortoise

The Tenerife giant tortoise (Centrochelys burchardi) is an extinct species of cryptodire turtle in the family Testudinidae endemic to the island of Tenerife, in the Canary Islands during the Middle Pleistocene.

== Characteristics ==
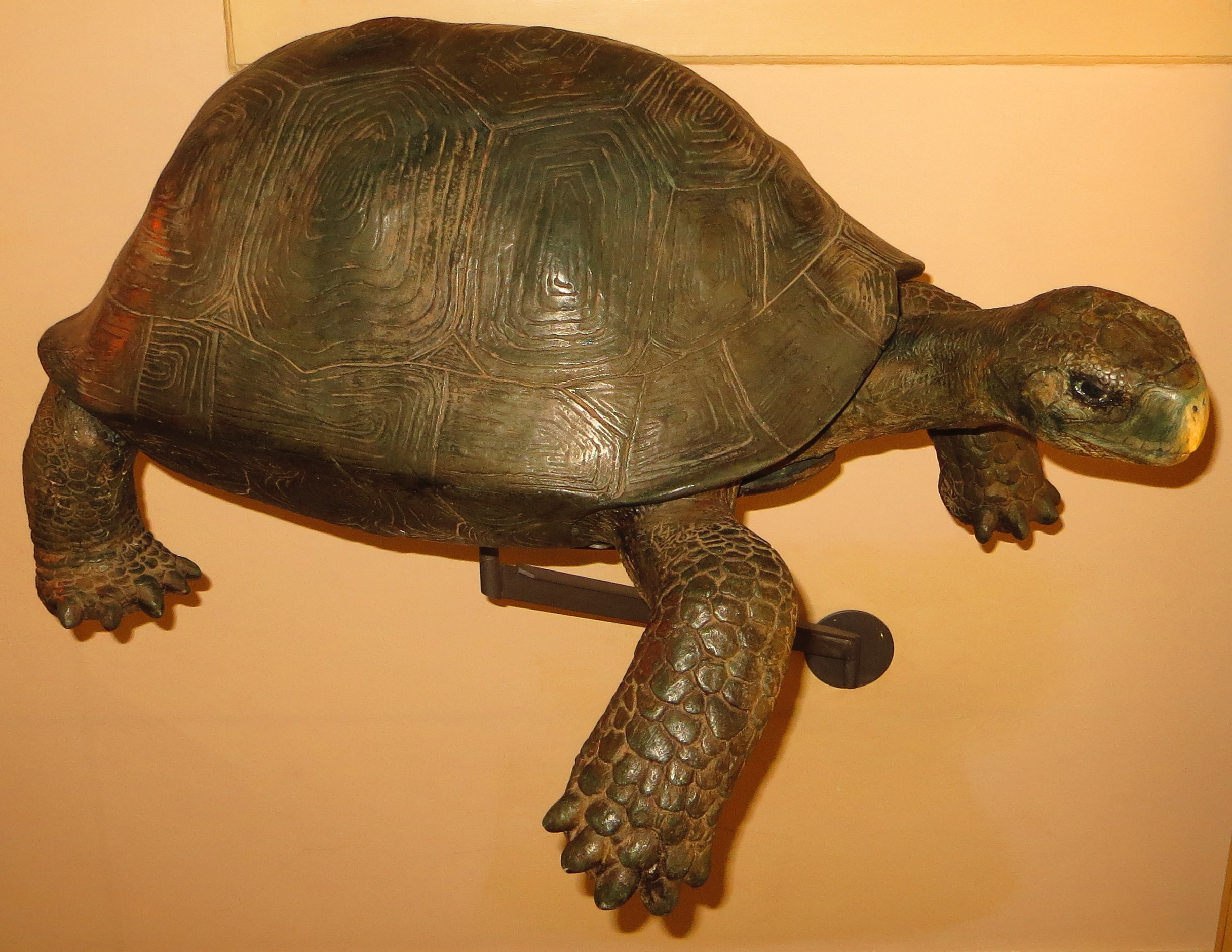
Restoration in Museo de la Naturaleza y el Hombre of Santa Cruz de Tenerife.

The species has an estimated carapace length of around 100 centimetres (3.3 ft). similar to giant tortoises currently found in some oceanic islands like the Galapagos Islands in the Pacific Ocean and Aldabra and the Seychelles in the Indian Ocean.

Remains of C. burchardi date to the Middle Pleistocene, around 670-200,000 years ago. Most fossils are of bones and shells, as well as a nest of fossilized eggs found in volcanic soil in the south of Tenerife, in the present municipality of Adeje. This species of giant tortoise was described in 1926 by Ernst Ahl, the first time a giant tortoise endemic to the Canary Islands described.

Another extinct tortoise species, C. vulcanica, is known from the island of Gran Canaria. C. burchardi had a larger shell, with a length of approximately 65 to 94 cm, while C. vulcanica shell had a 61 cm. It is believed that the ancestors of these tortoises could reach the eastern islands of the Canary Islands from the African continent and progressively moved to westward through that archipelago as their size also increased and its appearance evolved to adapt to the conditions of the archipelago.

Fossilized tortoise eggs have been found in the islands of Lanzarote and Fuerteventura; however, these eggs have not yet been properly described or named. The species of Fuerteventura has been linked to C. burchardi, but this identification is uncertain, and has been challenged.

While often placed in the genus Centrochelys, which contains the living African spurred tortoise, the limited remains of the species make its placement in the genus uncertain, and thus the species is often referred to as "Centrochelys" burchardi.

== See also ==
- List of extinct animals
- Island gigantism
- Giant tortoise
