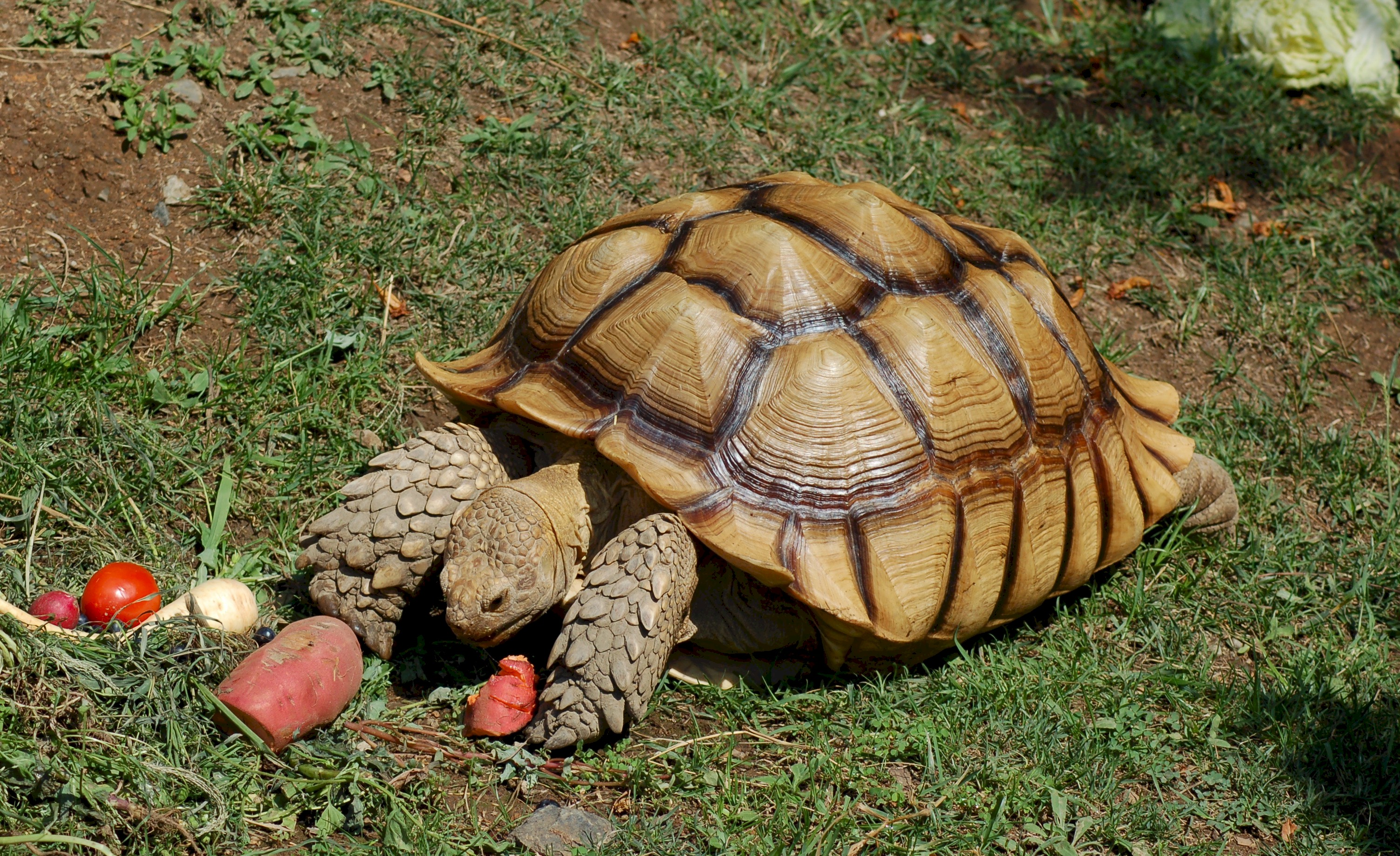
- Centrochelys sulcata

Scientific classification
- Kingdom: Animalia
- Phylum: Chordata
- Class: Reptilia
- Order: Testudines
- Suborder: Cryptodira
- Family: Testudinidae
- Genus: Centrochelys; Gray, 1872

Species
- See text

= Centrochelys =

Centrochelys Temporal range: Miocene–Recent

Genus of tortoises

Centrochelys is a genus of tortoise. It contains one living species, the African spurred tortoise (Centrochelys sulcata), native to the Sahel and adjacent areas. A number of fossil species have been attributed to this genus, but their placement in the genus is considered equivocal.

- †"Centrochelys" atlantica Sal Island, Cape Verde, Pleistocene
- †"Centrochelys" burchardi Tenerife, Canary Islands, Middle Pleistocene carapace length 80–100 centimetres (2.6–3.3 ft).
- †"Centrochelys" marocana Morocco, North Africa, latest Pliocene-earliest Pleistocene, c. 2.6 mya carapace length ~200 centimetres (6.6 ft).
- †“Centrochelys” punica Tunisia, North Africa, Early Pliocene carapace length ~150–200 centimetres (4.9–6.6 ft).
- †"Centrochelys" vulcanica Gran Canaria, Canary Islands, Pliocene only known from femur, estimated carapace length 61 centimetres (2.00 ft)

The conservation status of Centrochelys sulcata has been changed from Vulnerable to Threatened with extinction by the International Union for Conservation of Nature because of seasonal wildfires, the international pet trade, and competition for food and space with other domestic animals.

Centrochelys robusta from the Pleistocene of Malta has been transferred to the extinct genus Solitudo.
