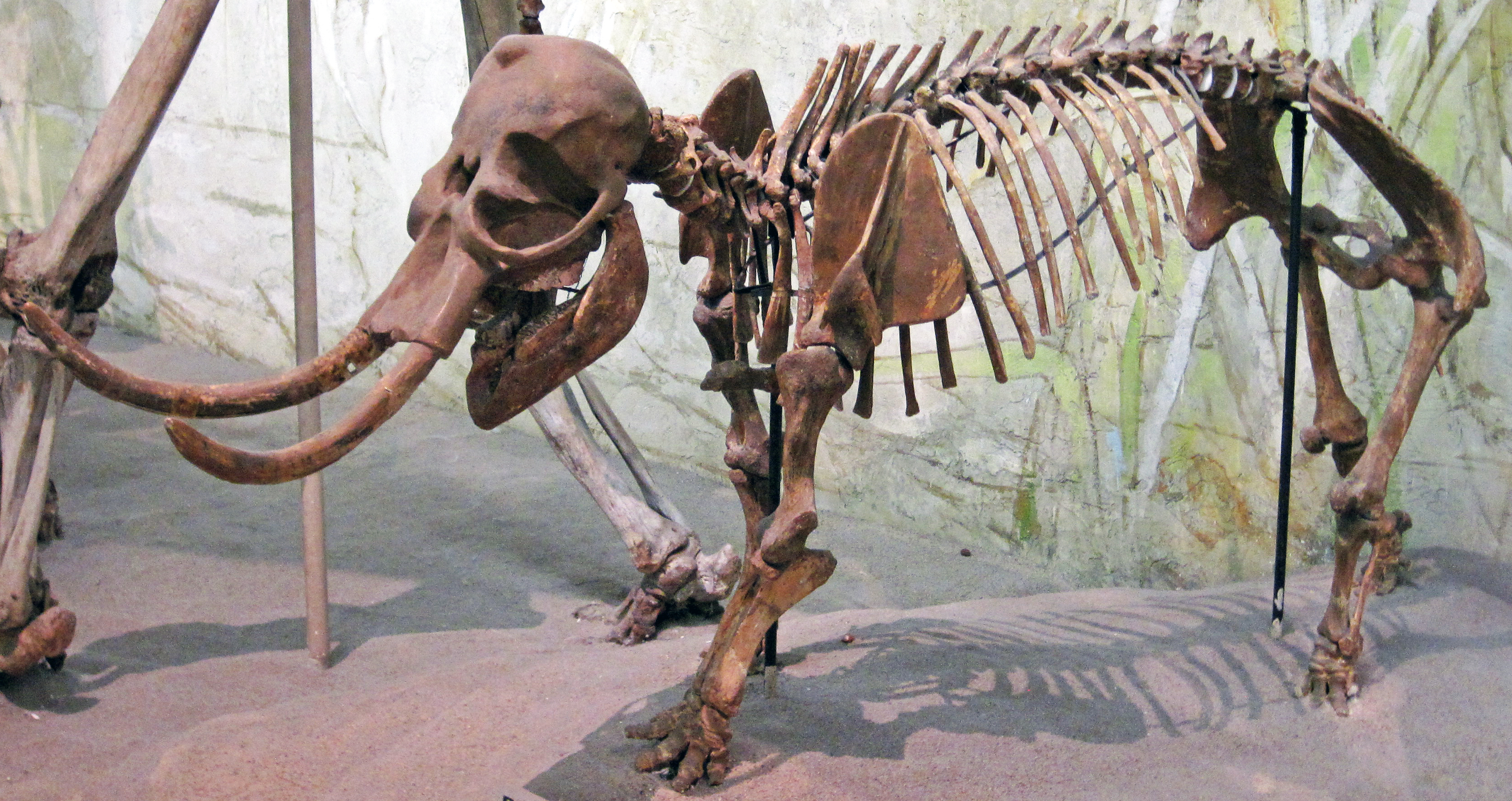
- Mounted skeleton, Nebraska State Museum of Natural History

Scientific classification
- Kingdom: Animalia
- Phylum: Chordata
- Class: Mammalia
- Order: Proboscidea
- Family: Elephantidae
- Genus: †Palaeoloxodon
- Species: †P. falconeri

Binomial name
- †Palaeoloxodon falconeri (Busk, 1867)

Synonyms
- Elephas falconeri Busk, 1867; Elephas melitensis Falconer in Busk, 1867; Palaeoloxodon melitensis (Falconer in Busk, 1867)

= Palaeoloxodon falconeri =

Palaeoloxodon falconeri Temporal range: Middle Pleistocene 0.5–0.2 Ma

Extinct species of dwarf elephant

Palaeoloxodon falconeri is an extinct species of dwarf elephant that lived during the Middle Pleistocene (sometime between around 500–200,000 years ago) on the Mediterranean islands of Sicily and Malta. It is amongst the smallest of all dwarf elephants, under 1 m (3 ft 3 in) in height as fully grown adults. A member of the genus Palaeoloxodon, it derived from a population of the mainland European straight-tusked elephant (Palaeoloxodon antiquus), with its small body size a result of insular dwarfism.

== Taxonomy ==
In 1859, during the digging of a watertank near the town of Żebbuġ in central Malta, a sediment filled cavern was excavated, leading to the discovery of an elephant molar, which the owner of the property later presented to Malta Library Museum. This prompted Thomas Abel Brimage Spratt to search through the excavated sediment as well as to continue further excavation of the cavern (now known as Zebbug Cave), yielding additional elephant molars as well as other animal remains.

In 1862, British paleontologist Hugh Falconer presented to the British Association at Cambridge a description of remains of dwarf elephants that had been discovered by Spratt in Zebbug cave. In 1867/68, following Falconer's death in 1865, the species Elephas melitensis was named in a posthumous publication of Falconer's notes by British paleontologist George Busk, in a paper combining Falconer's notes with Busk's own contributions. In the same publication Busk named the species Elephas falconeri for many of the smallest molars selected from the material originally ascribed by Falconer (for whom the species is named) to Elephas melitensis.

The species Elephas/Palaeoloxodon melitensis, formerly considered a distinct species or which P. falconeri was considered a synonym of (for example in Pohlig, 1893 and Fabiani 1928 and 1932), is now generally treated as a synonym of P. falconeri since a 1968 publication by Ambrosetti. Henry Fairfield Osborn in his 1942 posthumous monograph considered the species a member of the genus Palaeoloxodon, though some later 20th century authors continued to treat it as species of Elephas. Some publications during the 1990s tentatively suggested P. falconeri may be a kind of dwarf mammoth (genus Mammuthus).

By the 2010s its placement as a member of the genus Palaeoloxodon was widely accepted. Due to the species name P. falconeri being based on Maltese material, and uncertainty about the taxonomy of Sicilian and Maltese dwarf elephants and whether or not species were shared between the two islands has led modern authors to refer to the Sicilian material (such as that from Spinagallo Cave) as Palaeoloxodon ex gr. (ex grege) P. falconeri to reflect this uncertainty.

== Evolution and chronology ==
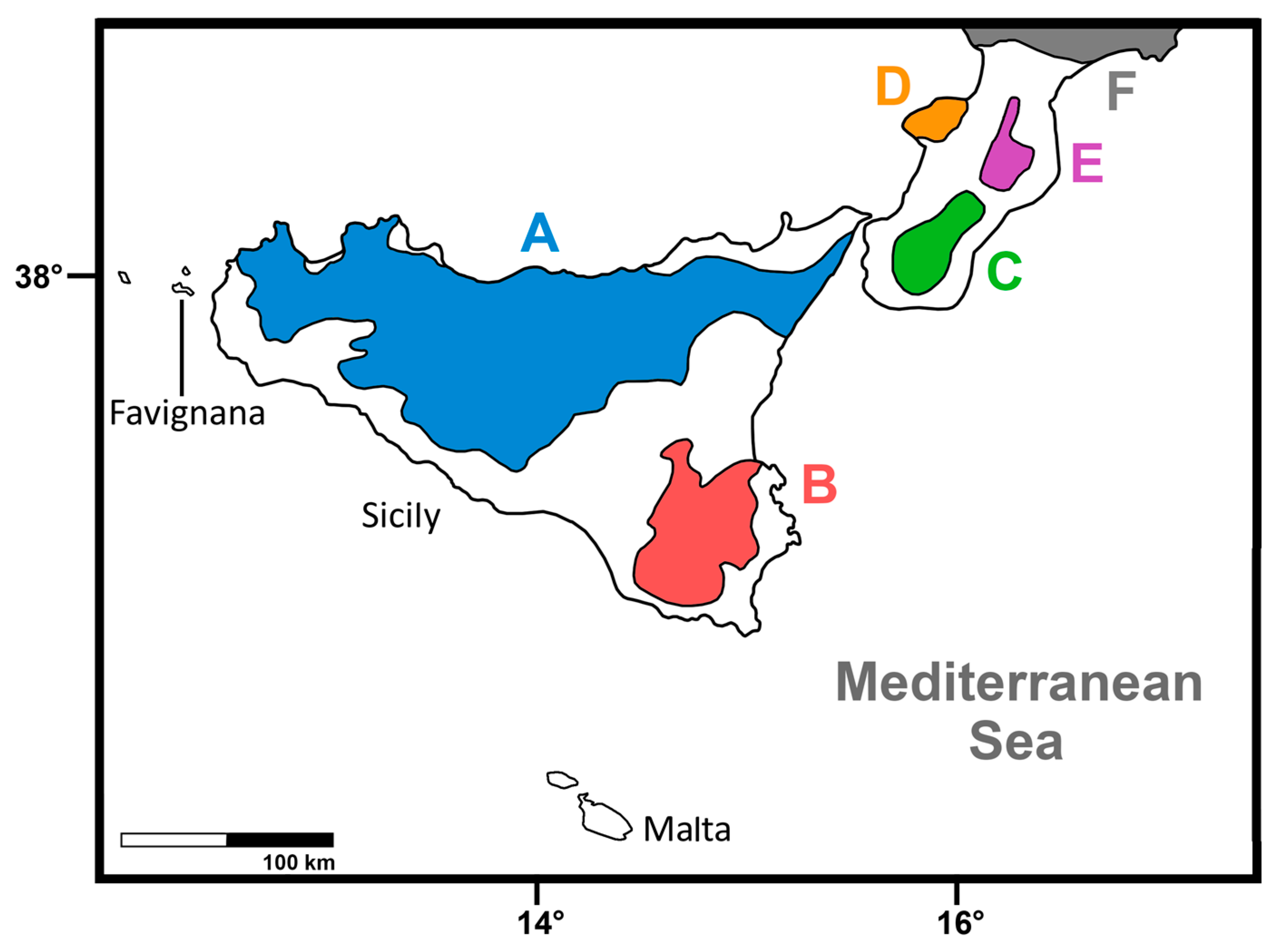
Map of Sicily and Calabria during the Early Pleistocene, which was similar to the paleogeography of the island during the early Middle Pleistocene when the ancestors of P. falconeri arrived on the island. Coloured areas show always emergent landmasses of Sicily and Calabria compared to modern land areas in black outline

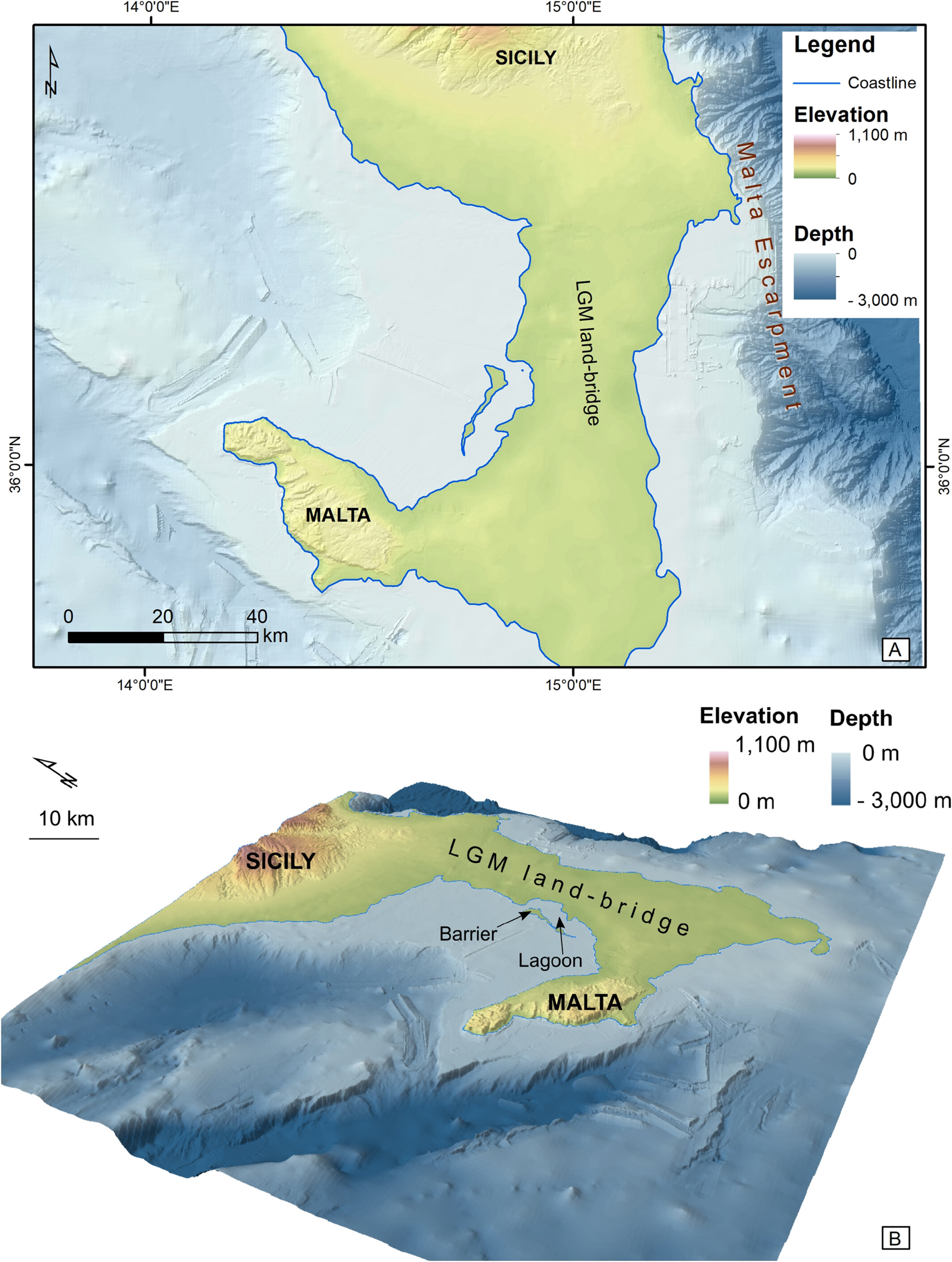
Map of the land bridge between Sicily and Malta formed as a result of glaciation-induced low sea level episodes, as reconstructed for the Last Glacial Maximum which postdates P. falconeri

Palaeoloxodon falconeri derives from the 4-metre-tall (13 ft) straight-tusked elephant (P. antiquus), which arrived in Europe approximately 800,000 years ago. The oldest radiometrically dated fossils of Palaeoloxodon on Sicily date to around 500,000 years ago, with the colonisation possibly occurring as early as 690,000 years ago or earlier. P. falconeri's ancestors most likely reached Sicily via swimming from the Italian mainland, likely via a series of islands that now form part of the southern Calabrian peninsula. Middle Pleistocene elephant remains from Luparello fissure in northwest Sicily that are considerably larger than "typical" P. falconeri are thought to likely represent ancestors of P. falconeri. Remains at several sites appear to show the size of P. falconeri and its ancestors becoming smaller over time. The chronology of the species on Sicily compared to that of the larger endemic species of Palaeoloxodon on the island, the 2 m (6.6 ft) tall Palaeoloxodon cf. mnaidriensis, is somewhat uncertain. It is generally thought that P. falconeri is the earlier species dating to the Middle Pleistocene, and that P. cf. mnaidriensis descends from a subsequent separate late Middle Pleistocene colonisation of the island by P. antiquus, suggested to date to approximately 200,000 years ago. P. falconeri likely dispersed to Malta from Sicily during an episode or episodes of low sea level during glacial periods, which exposed as dry land the large submarine plateau (the Hyblean-Malta plateau) between the two islands. The chronology of Maltese localities is poorly constrained. The important locality of Spinagallo Cave in southeast Sicily where a large sample of P. falconeri individuals have been found is suggested to date to around 366-233,000 years ago based on optically stimulated luminescence dating and uranium–thorium dating.

== Description ==
Size comparison of Palaeoloxodon falconeri compared to a human

Palaeoloxodon falconeri is considered to be a textbook example of insular dwarfism, with adult individuals around the size of modern elephant calves, drastically smaller than their mainland ancestors. In a 2015 study of specimens from Spinagallo Cave, a composite adult male specimen MPUR/V n1 was estimated to measure 96.5 cm (3 ft 2.0 in) in shoulder height and about 305 kg (672 lb) in weight, a composite adult female specimen MPUR/V n2 80 cm (2 ft 7.5 in) in shoulder height and about 168 kg (370 lb) in weight, and a composite newborn male specimen MPUR/V n3 33 cm (1 ft 1.0 in) in shoulder height and about 6.7 kg (15 lb) in weight. A later 2019 volumetric study revised the weight estimates for the adult male and adult female to about 250 kg (551 lb) and 150.5 kg (332 lb) respectively. The newborn male of the species was estimated in the same study to weigh 7.8 kg (17 lb). This makes P. falconeri the smallest known elephant species, along with the roughly equivalently sized but much more poorly known Palaeoloxodon cypriotes of Cyprus, and dwarf mammoth Mammuthus creticus of Crete. The Maltese remains of dwarf elephants including P. falconeri are much more fragmentary than those found in Sicily.

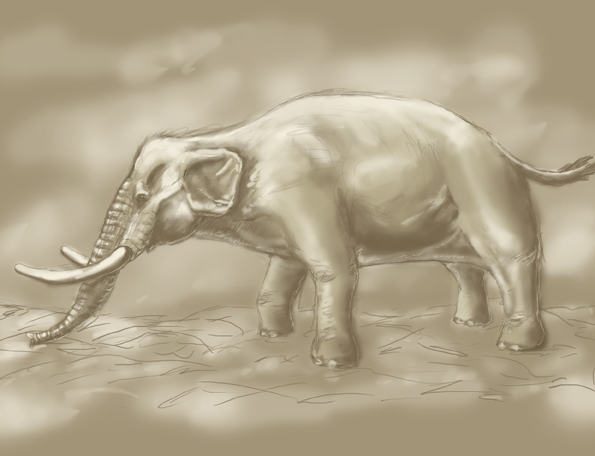
Reconstruction

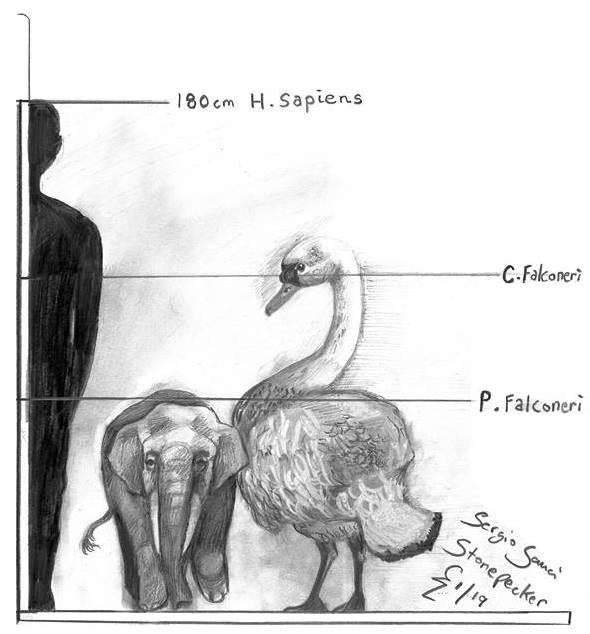
Illustration, with human and Cygnus falconeri for scale

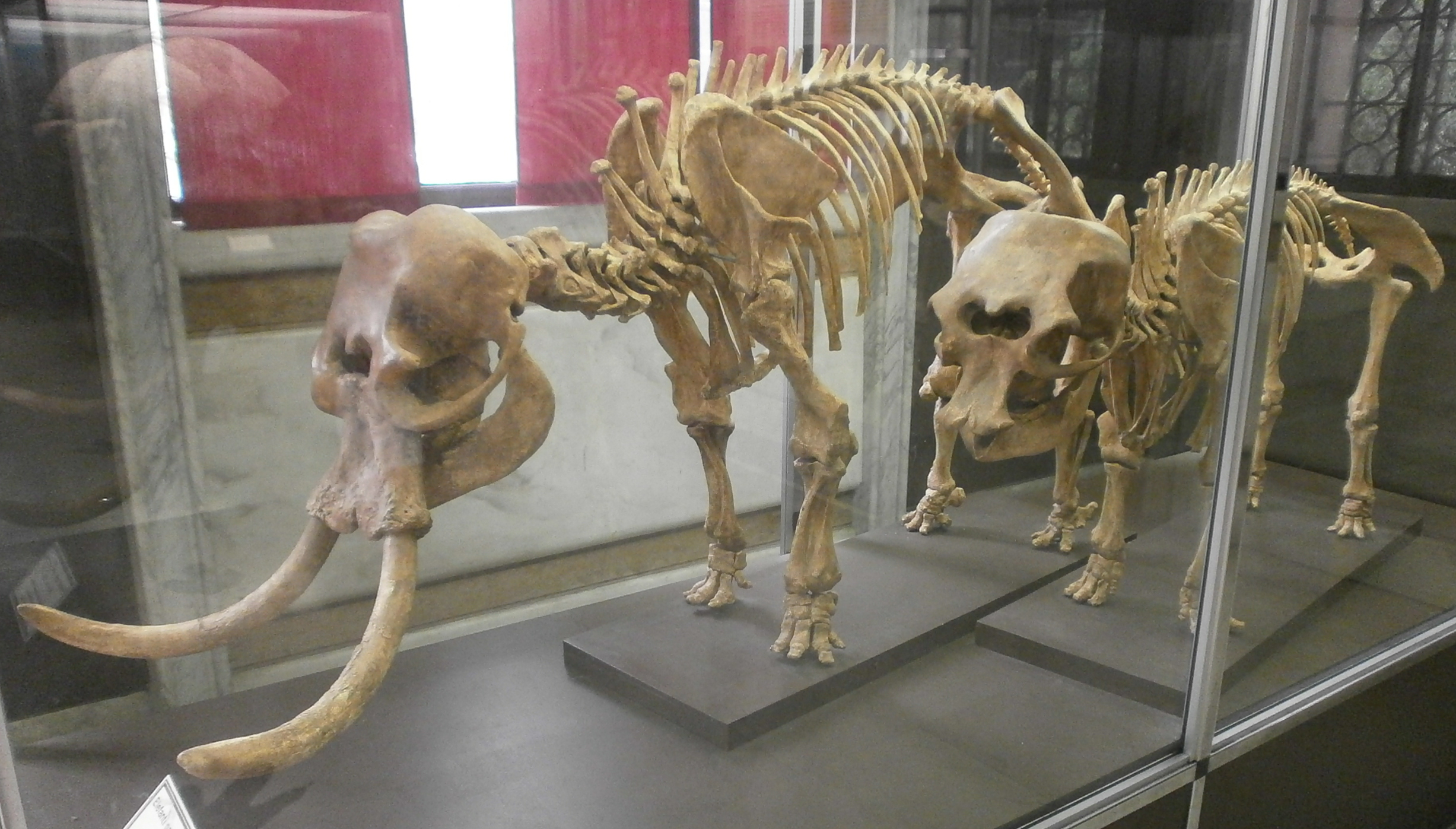
Skeletons in Milan Natural History Museum

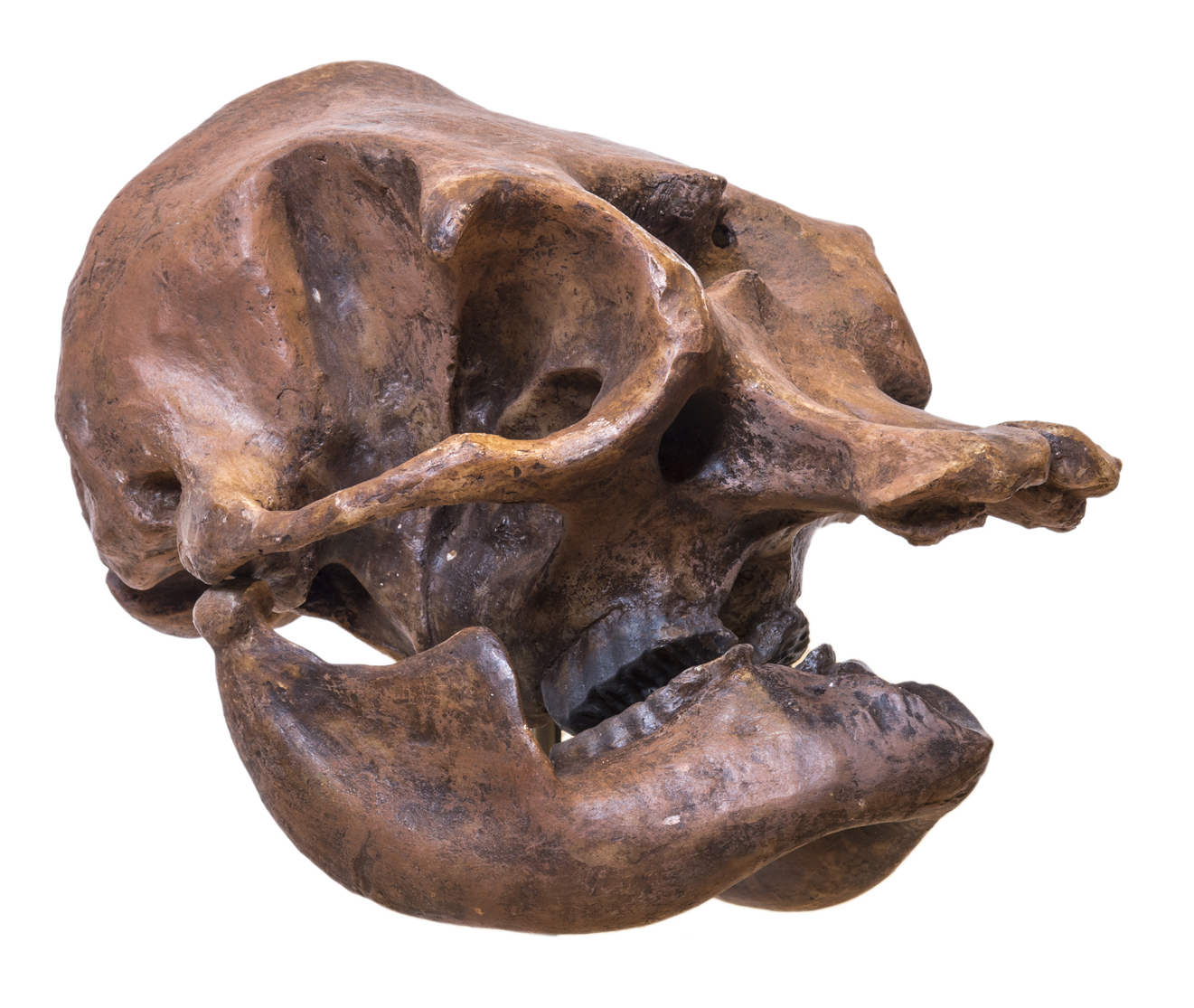
Skull at MUSE - Science Museum in Trento

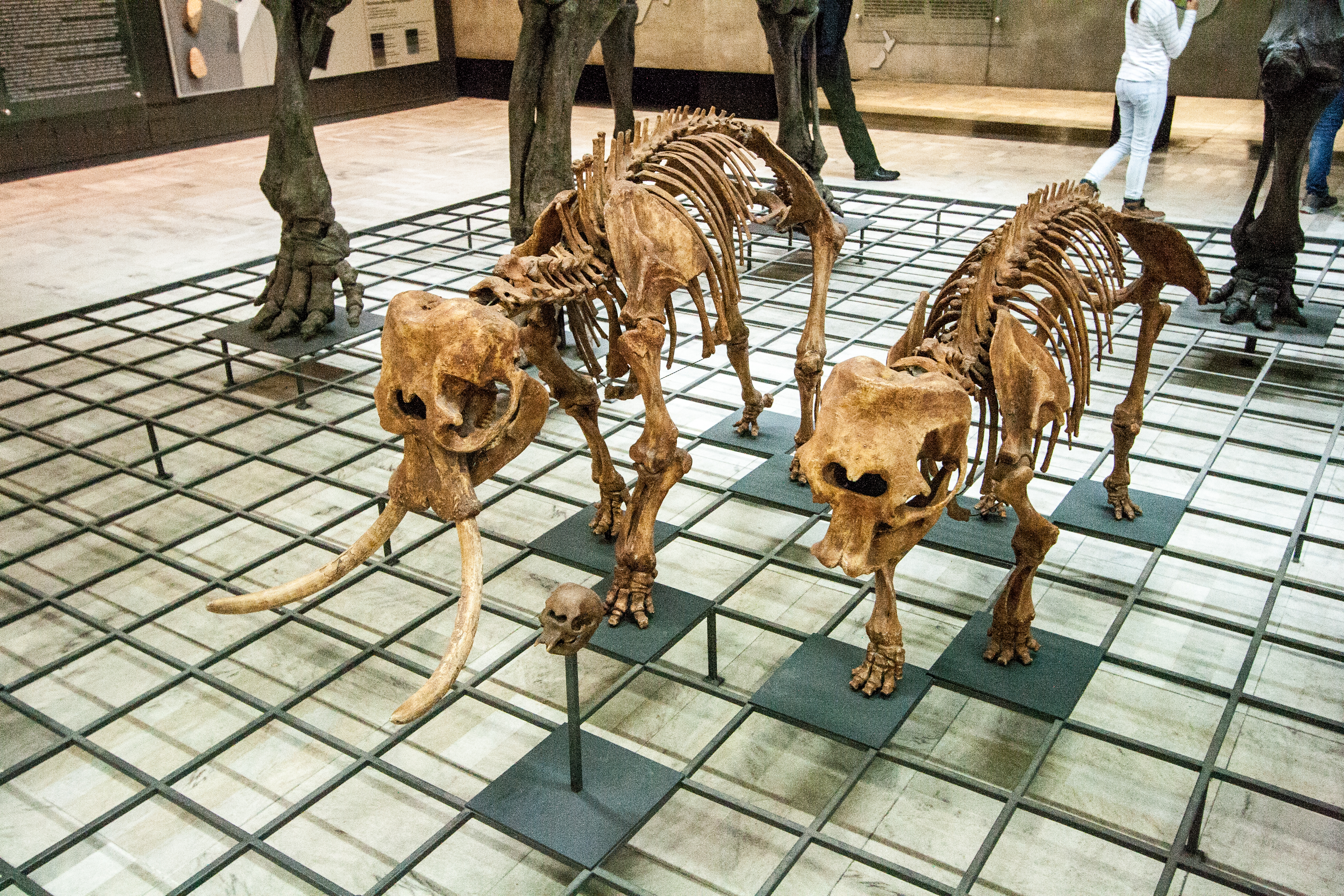
Skeleton of a male and female, as well as the skull of a juvenile, at Naturmuseum Senckenberg

The morphology of the skull demonstrates neotenic traits similar to those present in juvenile elephants, including the loss of the fronto-parietal crest present in other Palaeoloxodon species. The endocranial vault indicates brain was around the size of a human's, and proportionally much larger relative to skull size than in P. antiquus. In comparison to adult P. antiquus individuals, the neck was elongated, the torso was proportionally wider and longer, and the forelimbs were shorter while the hindlimbs were longer, resulting in a concave back. The limbs were proportionally more slender than P. antiquus, presumably because they needed to bear less weight. The feet were more digitigrade than modern elephants due to being proportionally narrower and higher. Female members of the species were tuskless.

Due to the much smaller body size resulting in increased heat loss, it is possible that the species was covered by a more dense coat of hair than present in living elephants in order to maintain a stable body temperature, though if it was present it was still likely sparse, due to elephants lacking sweat glands. The ears were also likely proportionally much smaller than living elephants for similar thermodynamic reasons.

== Paleobiology and paleoecology ==
The morphology of the limbs and feet suggest that P. falconeri may have been more nimble than living elephants, and better able to move on steep and uneven terrain.

Although it was previously suggested that P. falconeri had a relatively short life cycle and lifespan in comparison to living elephants, histology analysis of their bones, teeth and tusks demonstrates that despite their small size, individuals of P. falconeri had a similar life cycle length to living elephants. They grew very slowly, reaching sexual maturity at around 15 years of age (older than living elephants), with some individuals aged around 22 still having unfused limb bone epiphyses, indicating that they were still growing. The growth rate was only slightly lower post-sexual maturity, which contrasts with African bush elephants, whose growth slows considerably after sexual maturity. At least one individual reached a lifespan of at minimum 68 years, comparable to normally-sized elephants.

Sicily during the time of P. falconeri exhibited a depauperate fauna, with the only other terrestrial mammal species on the island being the cat-sized giant dormouse Leithia (the largest dormouse ever) as well as the giant dormouse Maltamys, the otter Nesolutra, and the shrew Crocidura esuae which is possibly the ancestor of the living Sicilian shrew, C. sicula though this is disputed (the presence of a fox of the genus Vulpes has been suggested but is unconfirmed). Sicily was also inhabited by a variety of bird species, as well as frogs (Discoglossus, Bufotes, Hyla), lizards (Lacerta), snakes (Hierophis, Natrix), pond turtles, tortoises (including the large Solitudo and smaller Hermann's tortoise), and bats.

On Malta, Palaeoloxodon falconeri co-occurs again with Leithia and Maltamys, Solitudo and Discoglossus, as well as with the giant swan Cygnus falconeri. At several Maltese localities, small P. falconeri elephants are found in the same strata as larger dwarf elephants, historically assigned to Palaeoloxodon mnaidriensis. It is unclear whether these represent distinct contemporaneous species, or whether these are time-averaged assemblages mixing remains of animals that lived at different times.

Dental wear (both mesowear and microwear) analysis from Sicilian specimens of P. falconeri suggests that it had a predominantly grazing based diet, with a high intake of abraisive material, such as grass phytoliths. The high wear was possibly a result of increasing concentration of abraisive material like phytoliths in plants as an evolutionary response to heavy grazing pressure on the limited land area of Sicily by P. falconeri, where it was the only major herbivore and was not subject to significant predation pressure.

== Extinction ==
Palaeoloxodon falconeri became extinct on Sicily as part of a faunal turnover event due to the tectonic uplift of northeast Sicily and Calabria towards the end of the Middle Pleistocene, resulting in the narrowing of the Strait of Messina and the corresponding distance between the island and the Italian mainland, similar to the geography in the region today, allowing a number of large mammal species from mainland Italy to colonise the island, including carnivores like cave hyenas, cave lions, grey wolves and brown bears, and herbivores like wild boar, red deer, fallow deer, aurochs, steppe bison and the hippo Hippopotamus pentlandi. The straight-tusked elephant again recolonised the island during this episode, giving rise to Palaeoloxodon cf. mnaidriensis, which though strongly dwarfed, was considerably larger than P. falconeri, with its larger body size likely a reaction to these large predators and competitors. This turnover including the arrival of Palaeoloxodon cf. mnaidriensis is suggested to have occurred at earliest around 200,000 years ago, corresponding with a sea level drop at the onset of the Penultimate Glacial Period (Marine Isotope Stage 6), with Palaeoloxodon cf. mnaidriensis likely present on Sicily by 160,000 years ago, corresponding to the lowest sea levels of MIS 6 around 160-140,000 years ago.

The timing of extinction of P. falconeri on Malta is uncertain, though remains of dwarf elephants are not known from Għar Dalam cave younger than 151,200 years ago. Although P. falconeri has historically been suggested to have been present at Għar Dalam, detailed analysis of elephant molars found in the cave suggests that P. falconeri is not present in Għar Dalam. The oldest fossiliferous stratigraphic layer of Għar Dalam (the "Bone Breccia" layer) is over 163,000 years old, which contains the remains of other, larger dwarf elephants, as well as remains of other animals not found at other Maltese sites containing P. falconeri, such as hippopotamus and probable red deer or endemic offshoots.
