= Centrochelys vulcanica =

Gran Canaria giant tortoise Temporal range: Pliocene

Scientific classification
- Domain: Eukaryota
- Kingdom: Animalia
- Phylum: Chordata
- Class: Reptilia
- Order: Testudines
- Suborder: Cryptodira
- Superfamily: Testudinoidea
- Family: Testudinidae
- Genus: Centrochelys
- Species: †C. vulcanica

Binomial name
- †Centrochelys vulcanica (López-Jurado & Mateo, 1993)

Synonyms
- Geochelone vulcanica López-Jurado & Mateo, 1993

Extinct species of tortoise

The Gran Canaria giant tortoise (Centrochelys vulcanica) is an extinct species of cryptodire turtle in the family Testudinidae endemic to the island of Gran Canaria, in the Canary Islands.

== Characteristics ==
C. vulcanica is known from fossils on Gran Canaria dating to the Pliocene epoch (5.3-2.6 million years ago). The other species is C. burchardi, from the island of Tenerife.

C. vulcanica was described by López-Jurado & Mateo in 1993. It is believed that the ancestors of these two species of giant tortoises reached the Canary Islands from North Africa. The majority of C. vulcanica fossils are of eggs and nests ranging in age from the Miocene until Pliocene. Bones and shells are known from the Miocene to the Upper Pleistocene. The maximum shell length is up to 61 centimeters, make it slightly smaller than C. burchardi, which had a shell length range of 65 to 94 cm.

Fossilized tortoise eggs have been found in the islands of Lanzarote and Fuerteventura; however, these eggs have not yet been properly described or named. The Fuerteventura fossils have been linked to C. burchardi, but this identification is uncertain, and has been challenged.

While often placed in the genus Centrochelys, which contains the living African spurred tortoise, the limited remains of the species make its placement in the genus uncertain, and thus the species is often referred to as "Centrochelys" vulcanica.

== See also ==
- List of extinct animals
- List of African animals extinct in the Holocene
- List of extinct animals of Europe
- Island gigantism
