= Bertha Jane Grundy =

English novelist (1837–1912)

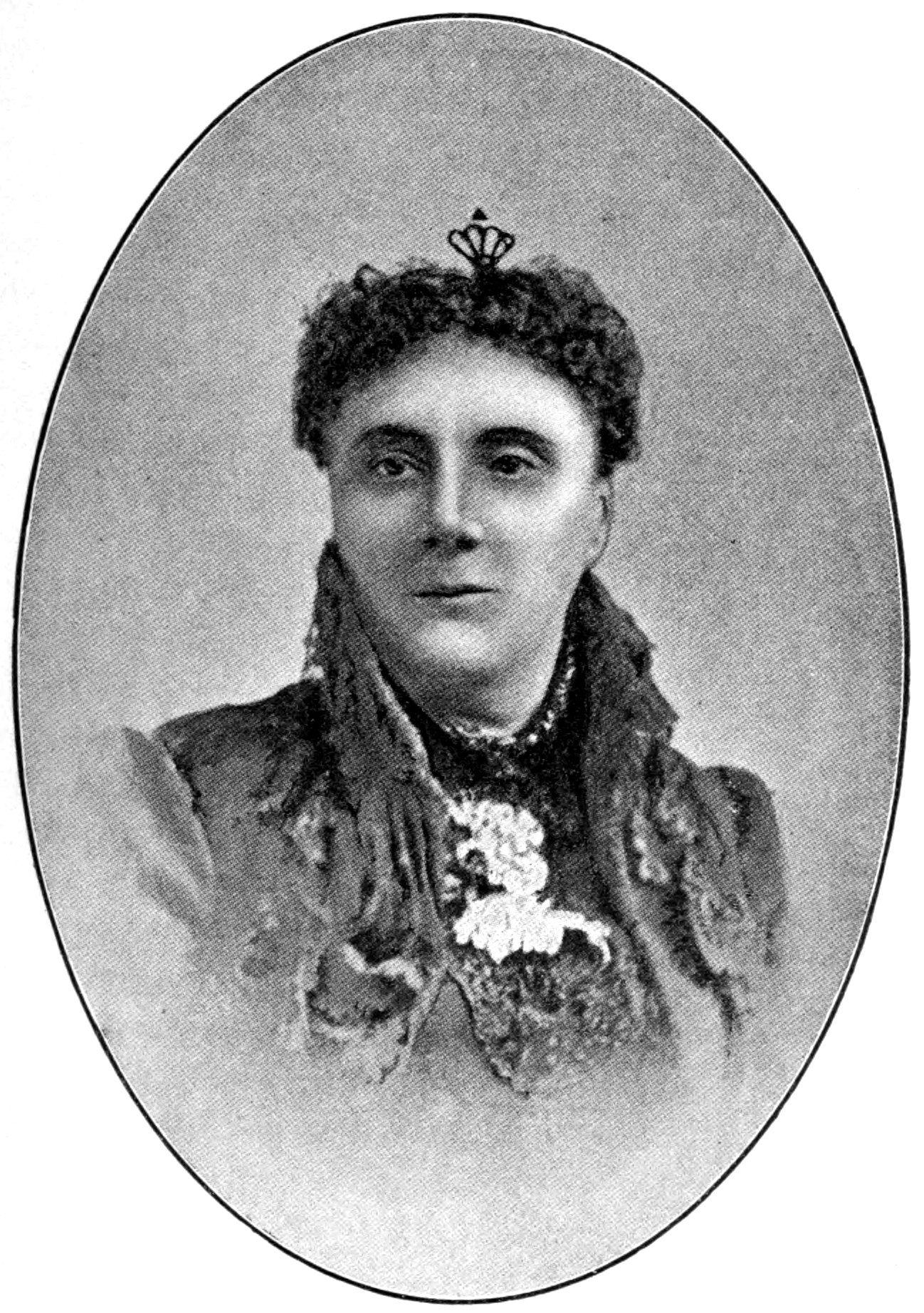
- Born: 24 August 1837
- Died: 5 September 1912
- Occupations: Writer, editor
- Children: Francis Adams

Bertha Jane Grundy (24 August 1837 – 5 September 1912) was an English novelist born in Moss-side, Lancashire. She also wrote as Mrs. Leith-Adams and Mrs. R. S. de Courcey Laffan. Later in life she wrote poetry and drama, and gave practical lectures to women writers.

== Personal life ==
Bertha Jane was born on 24 August 1837 as the eldest daughter of Frederick Grundy, a solicitor, and Jane, née Beardoe. She was first married on 26 October 1859 to Andrew Leith Adams and moved with him to Malta, where the older of her two sons, the writer Francis Adams, was born.

Andrew Adams died in 1882; in 1883, Bertha married Rev. Robert Stuart de Courcy Laffan. He became Headmaster of King Edward VI School, Stratford-upon-Avon (1885–1895), Principal of Cheltenham College, Cheltenham (1895–1899) and Rector of St Stephen Walbrook, London (1899–1927). Both her sons died young, the younger Harry Beardoe of tuberculosis at Dunwich, Queensland in 1892, and the older Francis, also tubercular, by committing suicide in Margate in 1893.

Grundy's other interests, apart from her writing, included playing the piano and keeping dogs.

Bertha Jane Grundy died at her home in Eccleston Square, Pimlico, London, on 5 September 1912.

== Work ==
Grundy's first publication, a short story entitled "Keane Malcombe's Pupil", appeared in 1876 in All the Year Round, where she was on the staff from 1895. Her most successful work was Geoffrey Stirling (1883), "which described a wife's revenge on the man who killed her husband."

Turning later to poetry (two volumes), drama and non-fiction, she wrote several practical lectures addressed to other women writers, urging them, for instance, "to do nothing without being paid."

=== Bibliography ===
- Nancy's Work, 1876
- Winstowe, 3 vols, 1877
- Madelon Lemoine, 3 vols, 1879
- My Land of Beulah, 3 vols, 1880
- Aunt Hepsy's Foundling, 3 vols, 1881
- Cosmo Gordon, 3 vols, 1882
- Expiated, 1882
- Lady Deane, 1882
- Geoffrey Stirling, 3 vols, 1883
- My Brother Sol, 3 vols, 1883
- A Song of Jubilee, 1887
- "Mathilde", a short story in All the Year Round, third series, summer extra, 1889
- Louis Draycott, 1890; serialised in All the Year Round, third series, vols 1 and 2, 1889
- Bonnie Kate, 1891
- The Peyton Romance, 1892
- A Garrison Romance, 1892
- The Cruise of 'The Tomahawk', 1892
- Colour Sergeant, No 1 Company, 2 vols, 1894
- The Old Pastures, 1895
- The Prince's Feathers, 1899
- Accessory After The Fact, 1899
- Cruel Calumny, 1901
- The Dream of Her Life, 1902
- What Hector Had To Say, 1902
- The Vicar of Dale End, 1906
- Poems, 1907
- Dreams Made Verity, 1910
- The Story of the Brotherhood of Hero Dogs, 1910
- A Book of Short Plays and a Memory, 1912
