= Francis Adams (writer) =

English writer (1862–1893)

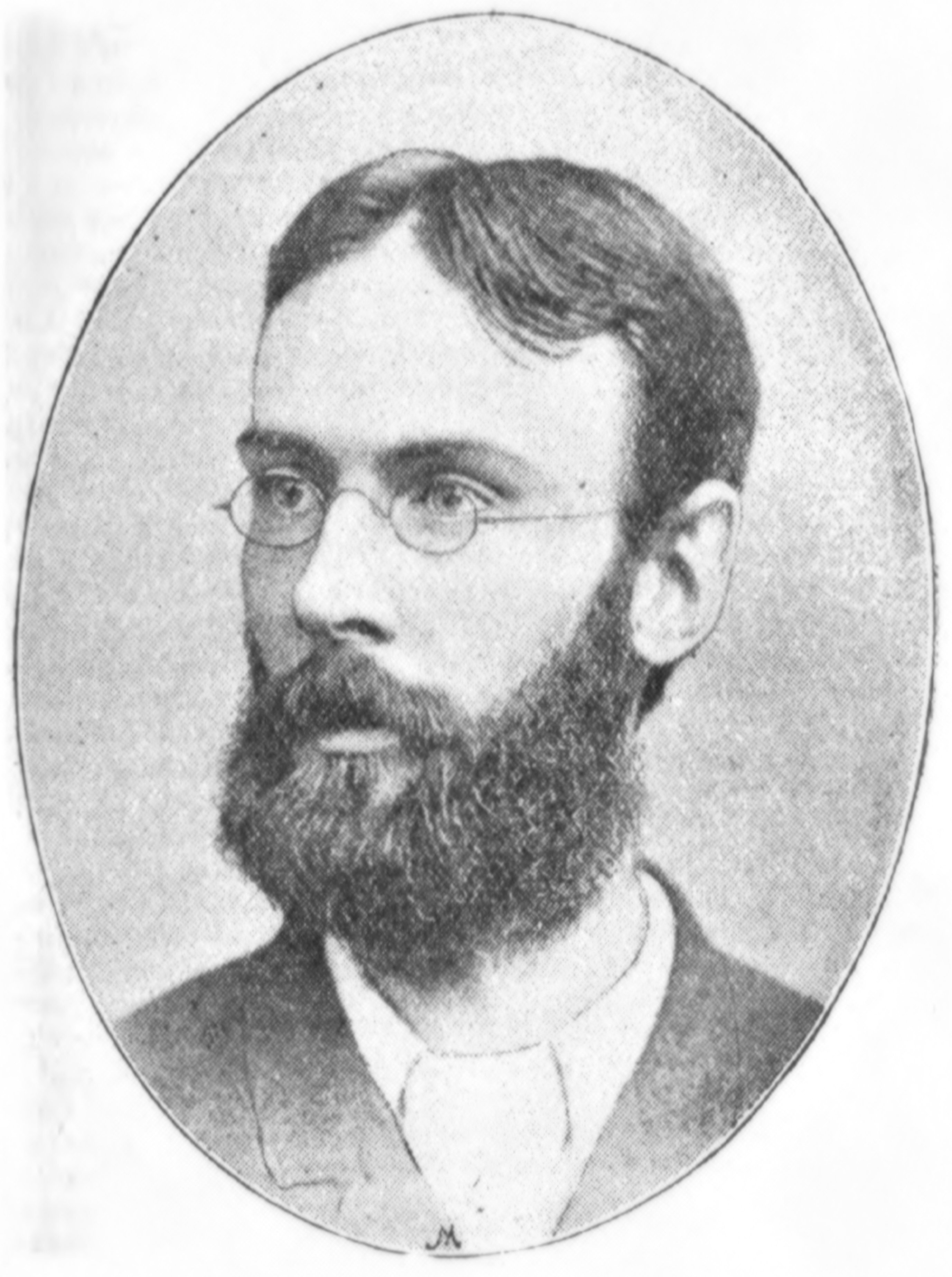
- Adams, c. 1889–1893
- Born: Francis William Lauderdale Adams; 27 November 1862; Malta
- Died: 4 September 1893 (aged 30); Margate, England
- Occupation: Writer
- Spouses: Helen Uttley (m. 1884; died 1886) Edith Goldstone (m. 1887)
- Parents: Andrew Leith Adams (father); Bertha Jane Grundy (mother)

Francis William Lauderdale Adams (27 September 1862 – 4 September 1893) was a British writer of anti-capitalist views. Adams was a representative British fin de siècle figure whose time in Australia contributed to its radical nationalism of the period, socialist ideas and aesthetics.

His health failing rapidly from tuberculosis, Adams spent the winter of December 1892 to February 1893 in Alexandria. Letters are extant from this time that he wrote to Wilfrid Scawen Blunt. Adams worked on finishing a book attacking the British rule in Egypt. Adams shot himself dead at a boarding house in Margate, England, on 4 September 1893. He shot himself in the mouth during a severe tubercular haemorrhage; he carried a pistol for this purpose. He was survived by his second wife, Edith (née Goldstone). It was an assisted suicide but she was not charged with any crime.

== Early years ==
He was born in Valletta, Malta, the son of Andrew Leith Adams FRS, an army surgeon and scientist, and his wife the novelist Bertha Jane Grundy. By 1878, when his father took up a chair in Cork, and his mother had published a novel and was moving into magazine journalism, his parents may have separated. The family home was in Maida Vale, London.

After completing his education at Shrewsbury School, Adams was in Paris from 1878 to 1880. He served from 1879 as an attaché there at the British Embassy. Not making his way into a diplomatic career, he then in 1882 took up a teaching position as an assistant master at Ventnor College on the Isle of Wight for two years.

John Sutherland states that Adams was estranged from his family by the early 1880s. He was out of sympathy with his mother's lifestyle. Tasker believes that he dropped the double-barrelled name Leith-Adams used by his parents as a "rejection of the genteel". His father died in 1882, and his mother married again, in 1883, to Robert De Courcy Laffan.

In July 1884 Adams married Helen Uttley whom he knew from his lodgings in Ventnor; he had divided his time, some spent there with periods based in London.

=== Period in London (c.1881–1884) ===
Adams joined the Social Democratic Federation, a Marxist political party, in London in 1883, and took part in labour organisation. The Labour Annual 1895 wrote that "E. London life burnt awful impressions on him." His poem on the West India Docks in Songs of the Army of the Night came with comments beginning "The spectacle of the life of the London Dock labourers is one of the most terrible examples of the logical outcome of the present social system."

At this period Adam befriended Frank Harris, whom he approached after Harris made a speech at Speaker's Corner. He considered Harris a more brilliant conversationalist than Oscar Wilde, whom he also knew. He visited Henry Stephens Salt and his wife at Tilford, where he encountered George Bernard Shaw.

== Australia ==
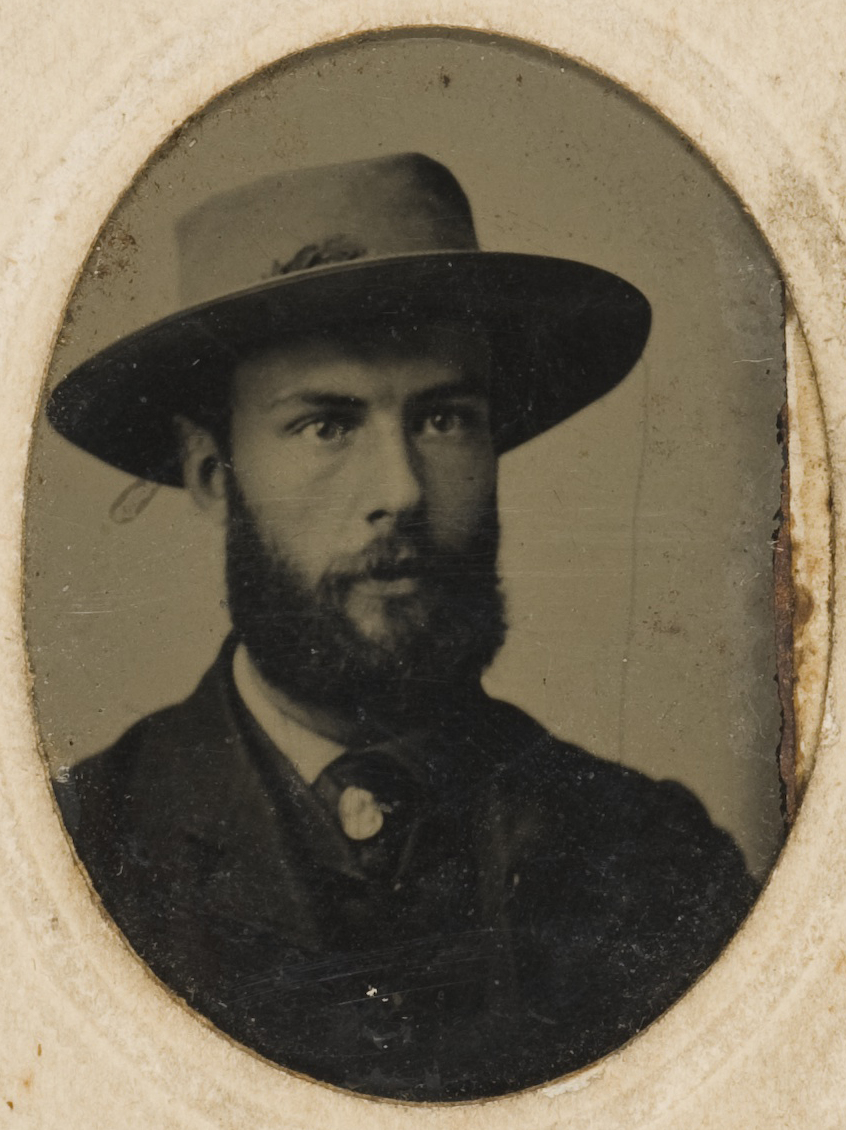
Portrait of Francis Adams c. 1887

Adams was in Australia from 1884 to 1890, moving there with his wife. They travelled separately, Francis Adams taking the clipper Rodney in mid-1884. He had work as a tutor on a station at Jerilderie, New South Wales, but soon moved on to Sydney; Helen had joined him there by early 1886. He dedicated himself to writing. He contributed to periodicals, including The Bulletin.

Later Adams was in Brisbane, where Helen died of rheumatic fever after giving birth to a baby boy, Leith, who also died. Adams remained in Brisbane until the early part of 1887. From Sydney, he went on a sea voyage to China and Japan. He remarried later in 1887.

Adams returned to Brisbane, where he lived until around the end of 1889. He wrote leaders for the Brisbane Courier and The Boomerang. In Queensland politics, he admired Thomas McIlwraith. His Courier colleague Reginald Spencer Browne thought highly of the quality of his leaders.

In the roles of supporters of state socialism and "labour polemicists", Adams and William Lane of the Boomerang influenced later economic thought on the Australian left. Sydney Jephcott, a friend of Adams, first encountered Lane while staying with Adams. Mary Gilmore wrote in 1953 that Adams dominated the field of "revolutionary verse" in Australia in his time.

The Labour Annual mentioned Adams as a participant in the "great Australian strike". It was defined by George Lacon James as a concerted campaign for organised labour, "a trial of strength against shipowner, squatter, and employer of labour generally." Ada Cambridge, of radical views but not a socialist, analysed it as substantively "the Shearers' Strike and the Maritime Strike", begun by the shearers. Since the Labour Annual gave the date 1888, a context for Adams's involvement is in Lane's political novel The Workingman's Paradise (1892), of which "the first part is laid during the summer of 1888–89", ahead of the 1891 Australian shearers' strike.

His younger brother Harry Beardoe Adams died of tuberculosis at Dunwich, Queensland, on 13 September 1892, at age 25.

== Later years and death ==
Adams returned to England in early 1890. He visited his mother, staying at the King Edward VI School, Stratford-upon-Avon where his stepfather Robert Laffan was headmaster. As Mr. F. W. Leith-Adams, he was mentioned in a newspaper report of an "at home" event she held, on 12 July 1892.

His health failing rapidly from tuberculosis, Adams spent the winter of December 1892 to February 1893 in Alexandria. Letters are extant from this time that he wrote to Wilfrid Scawen Blunt; Blunt visited Egypt, returning to the United Kingdom in May 1893. Adams worked on finishing a book attacking the British rule in Egypt. He name-checked Blunt in it ("Mr Wilfrid Blunt, to whose writings I owe several suggestions").

Adams shot himself dead at a boarding house in Margate, England, on 4 September 1893. He shot himself in the mouth during a severe tubercular haemorrhage; he carried a pistol for this purpose. He was survived by his second wife, Edith (née Goldstone). It was an assisted suicide but she was not charged with any crime. At the inquest, Margate coroner Toke Harvey Boys asked Edith Adams if she could have prevented the death. She replied in the affirmative, but said that to do so would have been the act of a "contemptible coward". Bernard Shaw subsequently took an interest in her. The local medical officer of health, Dr. Arthur William Scatliff, testified that Adams had already lost so much blood that death was inevitable.

The Clarion wrote "By the sad death of Francis Adams Socialism loses one of its best friends and most fervid singers". The Westminster Gazette printed his self-penned epitaph:

Bury me with clenched hands,
And eyes open wide,
For in storm and struggle I lived,
And in struggle and storm I died.

== Bibliography ==
Adams published as a teenager, for example a story in Emily Faithfull's Victoria Magazine, Christmas issue 1878, for which his mother also wrote.

=== Novels ===
- Leicester: An Autobiography (1885)
- Madeline Brown's Murderer (1887); "a novel that turns a society pages journalist into an investigative journalist".
- John Webb's End: Australian Bush Life (1891)
- The Melbournians: A Novel (1892); a society romance featuring a central female character and a democratically minded Australian journalist.
- Lady Lovan : A Novel (1895) (as by "Agnes Farrell")

His novel A Child of the Age, a reworking of Leicester, an Autobiography, was brought out posthumously in 1894 by John Lane, as the fourth book in the publisher's Keynote Series. It describes the schooldays (at "Glastonbury") and struggles of a would-be poet and scholar, Bertram Leicester, with a fin-de-siècle melancholy.

=== Short stories ===
- Australian Life (1892)

=== Verse ===
Adams admired the work of Adam Lindsay Gordon, writing on him in a piece in Australian Essays. Henry Salt writing in 1921 stated that Adams was more an authentic "Socialist poet" than William Morris, and linked him to John Barlas.

In Songs of the Army of the Night (1888), Adams displayed a deep sympathy with the downtrodden; Samuel George Hobson called it "a passionate outburst of anger and yearning." It has been seen as advocacy of armed struggle. The first edition was with Vizetelly & Co. A second edition was published in 1892 by William Dobson Reeves, formerly partner with Osborne Turner in Reeves & Turner. A further enlarged edition by Reeves in 1894 included an introduction and memoir by Henry Salt.

Other works in verse were:

- Henry and Other Tales (1884)
- Poetical Works (1887). This book was published in Brisbane, a quarto volume of over 150 pages printed in two columns.
- The Mass of Christ (c.1894), a posthumous publication by the Manchester Labour Press.

=== Essays ===
- Australian Essays (1886)
- The Australians: A Social Sketch (London: T. Fisher Unwin, 1893)
- Essays in Modernity: Criticisms and Dialogues (1899)

=== Drama ===
- Tiberius: A Drama (1894). It was edited with an introduction by William Michael Rossetti. There was a dedication to "Harry Beardoe Adams, only brother, truest critic, dearest friend".

=== Politics ===
The New Egypt: A Social Sketch was published after Adams's death in 1893, edited by John Wilson Longsdon. Longsdon (1863–1945), a schoolmaster, acted as a literary agent for Adams in the United Kingdom, and later as his literary executor. He graduated B.A. at St John's College, Oxford in 1887.
