= Andrew Leith Adams =

Scottish physician, naturalist and geologist

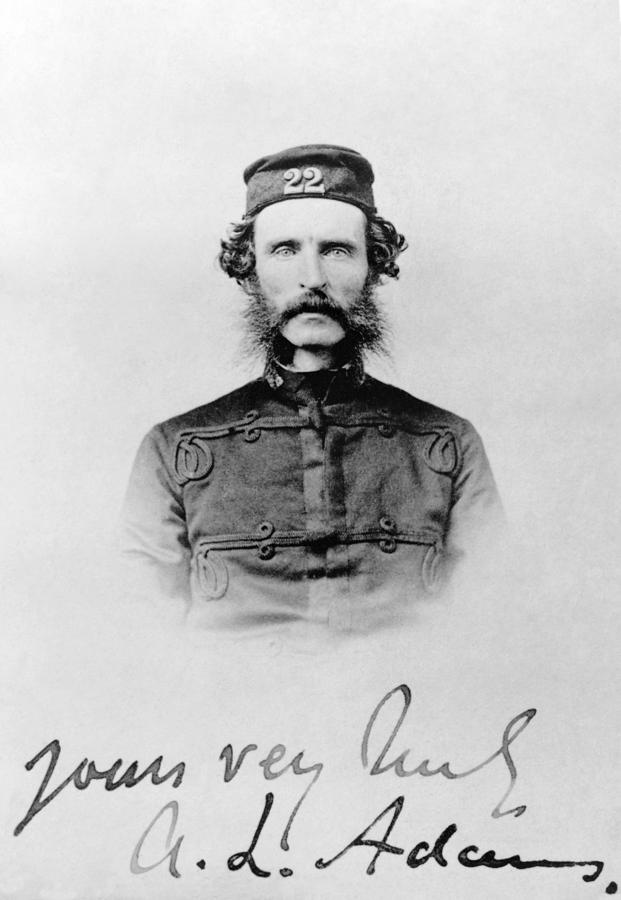
c. 1870

Andrew Leith Adams FRSE, FRS (21 March 1827 – 29 July 1882) was a Scottish army physician, naturalist and geologist. He collected and described specimens of birds and mammals, writing also about his travels in Asia and the middle east where he served at various times. He was married to the novelist Bertha Jane Grundy and was the father of the writer Francis Adams.

== Life and career ==
Adams was the son of surgeon Francis Adams (1796–1861) and Espeth Shaw. After the early death of his mother, he was raised by his father in Banchory-Ternan. Along with their father the sons explored natural history along the banks of the Dee and in the Grampian mountains. They collected bird specimens for their family cabinet of curiosities. He studied medicine at Marischal College, University of Aberdeen in 1846 where he was influenced by William MacGillivray. Adams joined as an army physician in 1848, initially with the 94th foot but transferring to the 22nd Infantry Regiment in India. Between 1849–1854 he was posted in Dagshai, Rawalpindi and Peshawar (the last under Sir Sydney Cotton). He also served in Kashmir, Egypt, Malta (1861–1868), Gibraltar and Canada. He married Bertha Jane Grundy on 26 October 1859, who later became famous as a novelist.

He spent his spare time studying the natural history of these countries. He was among the first to study the interior of Ladakh and wrote about it in "The Birds of Cashmere and Ladakh". The orange bullfinch (Pyrrhula aurantiaca) was discovered by him as also the first breeding site of brown-headed gulls (Larus brunnicephalus) in the lakes of the Tibetan plateau. In 1868, following twenty years of service in the army, he was promoted to surgeon-major.

After his retirement from the army in 1873, Adams was professor of natural history at Trinity College, Dublin and Queen's College, Cork. He was elected a fellow of the Geographical Society in 1870, fellow of the Royal Society of Edinburgh in 1872, and Fellow of the Royal Society in 1873. He died of a pulmonary haemorrhage on 29 July 1883 at Rushbrook Villa (Cork).

Adams sent most of his specimens to the Fort Pitt Museum of Natural History at Chatham founded by Sir James MacGrigor. These were examined by other zoologists and he is commemorated in the black-winged snowfinch Montifringilla adamsi and in the genus of the Pleistocene giant dormouse of Malta and Sicily Leithia melitensis and Leithia cartei. In 1868 Leith Adams described the very large form of giant dormouse from the Maqhlaq cave as Myoxus melitensis and the smaller form as Myoxus cartei. Later, Richard Lydekker assigned the two species to a new genus, named Leithia in honour of Leith Adams in 1895.

== Publications ==
Adams wrote three books Wanderings of a Naturalist in India, the Western Himalayas and Cashmere (1867), Notes of a Naturalist in the Nile Valley and Malta (1871) and Field and Forest Rambles (1873) and contributed numerous notes to scholarly societies. His publications included:

- Adams, A.L. (1859). "Notes on the habits, haunts, etc. of some of the birds of India". Proc. Zool. Soc. London. 26: 466–512. doi:10.1111/j.1469-7998.1858.tb06404.x.
- Adams, A.L. (1859). "The birds of Cashmere and Ladakh". Proc. Zool. Soc. London. 27: 169–190.
- Adams, A.L. (1863). "Observations on the Fossiliferous caves of Malta". Journal of the Royal Society. 4 (2): 11–19. 2 plates, July 1862-Jan. 1863.
- Adams, A.L. (1864). "Notes on the Geology of a portion of the Nile Valley north of the Second Cataract in Nubia, taken chiefly with the view of inducing further search for fluviatile shells at high levels". The Quarterly Journal of the Geological Society of London. 20 (1–2): 6–19. doi:10.1144/GSL.JGS.1864.020.01-02.08. S2CID 128836595. 4 figures.
- Adams, Andrew Leith (1867). Wanderings of a naturalist in India. Edinburgh: Edmondston and Douglas.
- Adams, A.L. (1868). "On a species of dormouse (Myoxus) occurring in the fossil state in Malta". Transactions of the Zoological Society of London. 6 (5): 307–308. doi:10.1111/j.1096-3642.1868.tb00579.x. with a plate.
- Adams, A.L. (1870). Notes of a naturalist in the Nile Valley and Malta. 195pp. Edinburgh (Edmonton and Douglas).
- Adams, A.L. (1871). Monograph on British fossil elephants. London: Palaeontographical Society.
- Adams, A.L. (1873). Field and forest rambles. London: Henry S. King & Co.
- Adams, A.L. (1874). "On the dentition and osteology of the Maltese fossil elephant, being a description of the remains discovered by the author in Malta between the years 1860 and 1866". Transactions of the Zoological Society of London. 9 (1): 1–124. doi:10.1111/j.1096-3642.1874.tb00235.x. plates I–XXII.
- Adams, A.L. (1874). Concluding Report on the Maltese Fossil Elephants. Report of the British Association for 1873, 185–187.
- Adams, A. L. (1875). "On a fossil saurian vertebra, Arctosaurus osborni from the Arctic region". Proceedings of the Royal Irish Academy. 2: 177–179.
- Adams, A. Leith (1877). "Ancient and Extinct British Quadrupeds" . The Zoologist. 3. Vol. 1, no. 4. pp. 121–149 – via Wikisource.

== Other sources ==
- Anon (19 August 1882) Obituary: Andrew Leith Adams, M.B., F.R.S. The British Medical Journal 2(1129):338
