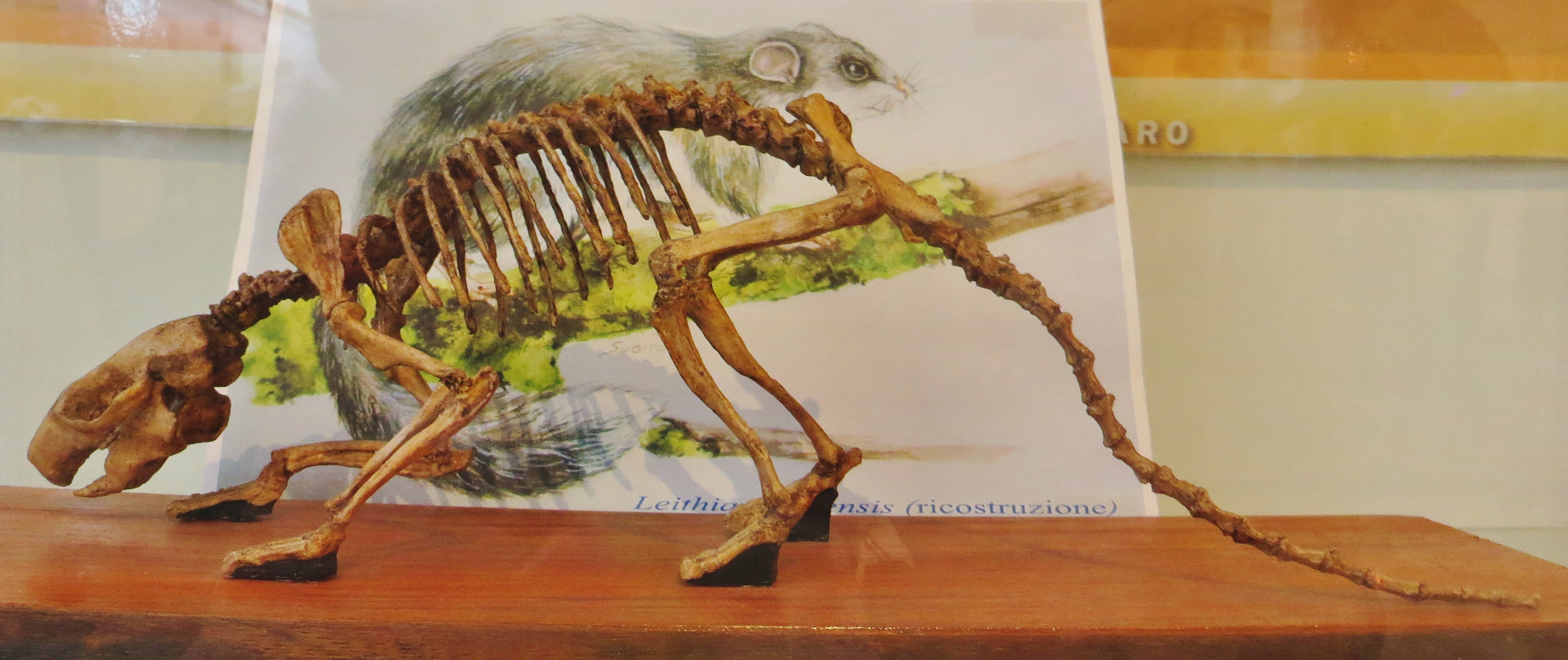
- Skeleton of Lethia melitensis

Scientific classification
- Kingdom: Animalia
- Phylum: Chordata
- Class: Mammalia
- Order: Rodentia
- Family: Gliridae
- Subfamily: Leithiinae
- Genus: †Leithia; Lydekker, 1896

Type species
- †Myoxus melitensis Adams, 1863

species
- Leithia melitensis (Adams, 1863); Leithia cartei (Adams, 1863)

= Leithia =

Leithia Temporal range: Early Pleistocene–Late Pleistocene

Extinct genus of giant dormice

Leithia is an extinct genus of giant dormice from the Pleistocene of the Mediterranean islands of Malta and Sicily. It is considered an example of island gigantism. Leithia melitensis is the largest known species of dormouse, living or extinct, being twice the size of any other known species.

== Discovery and taxonomy ==
The species were first named by Andrew Leith Adams in 1863 from remains found in caves in Malta and were assigned to the living genus Myoxus. Leithia was proposed in 1896 by Richard Lydekker as a new genus, suggesting an arrangement currently recognised as the subfamily Leithiinae; the names honour Leith Adams. Two species of Leithia, namely Leithia melitensis and the smaller L. cartei, lived in Sicily and Malta.

== Description ==
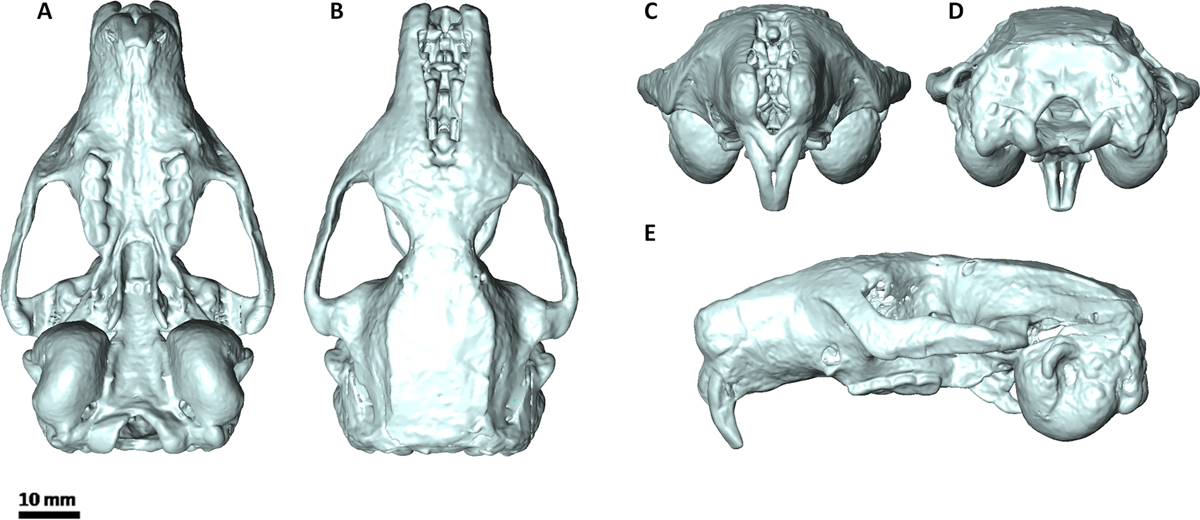
Digital composite of a complete skull of Leithia melitensis

The skull of Leithia melitensis reached a length of approximately 7 centimetres (2.8 in), roughly twice the length of that of the European garden dormouse (Eliomys quercinus). L. melitensis reached a total size comparable to a cat or a rabbit, with an estimated body mass of approximately 1 kilogram (2.2 lb). Compared to Eliomys, the skull morphology of L. melitensis is much more robust, particularly the zygomatic region (indicating the presence of large masseter muscles in life) and the pterygoid flange. The rostrum of L. melitensis relatively short, and the molar teeth are proportionally enlarged relative to Eliomys. The mandible of L. melitensis is also extremely robust.

== Ecology ==
The teeth of Leithia melitensis exhibit a variable amount of wear, indicating an abrasive, and probably largely herbivorous diet, with the lower jaw exhibiting greater adaption to chewing rather than gnawing. Leithia was likely predated upon by large birds of prey native to the islands, such as the endemic large barn-owl Tyto mourerchauvireae.

== Evolutionary history ==
The closest living relative of Leithia is assumed to be Eliomys (which among others, contains the European garden dormouse) based on morphological similarities. Remains tentively referred to Leithia are known from the Early Pleistocene (late Villafranchian) "Monte Pellegrino" faunal complex. However, other authors have suggested that this taxon is instead more closely related to the genus Maltamys, also endemic to Sicily and Malta. It has been suggested by some that the ancestors Leithia arrived in Sicily during the Late Miocene (Messinian) or Pliocene, but this is not preserved in the fossil record. For most of the Middle Pleistocene during the "Elephas falconeri" faunal complex, Leithia was one of a small number of mammal species present on Sicily and Malta, alongside the sheep-sized dwarf elephant Palaeoloxodon falconeri, the large dormouse Maltamys, a shrew belonging to the genus Crocidura, and an otter. During the late Middle Pleistocene a faunal turnover event occurred, caused by the uplift of Calabria and Sicily resulting in a closer connection with the Italian mainland, which during episodes of low sea level allowed some large animals from the mainland fauna of Italy to invade Sicily. Leithia persisted alongside the new arrivals for some time as demonstrated by their co-occurrence in deposits assigned to the "Elephas mnaidriensis" faunal complex, but apparently became extinct sometime before the end of the Pleistocene, prior the deposition of deposits assigned to the "Grotta S. Teodoro Pianetti" faunal complex.

== See also ==
- List of extinct animals of Europe
- Hypnomys a genus of giant dormice known from the Balearic Islands
