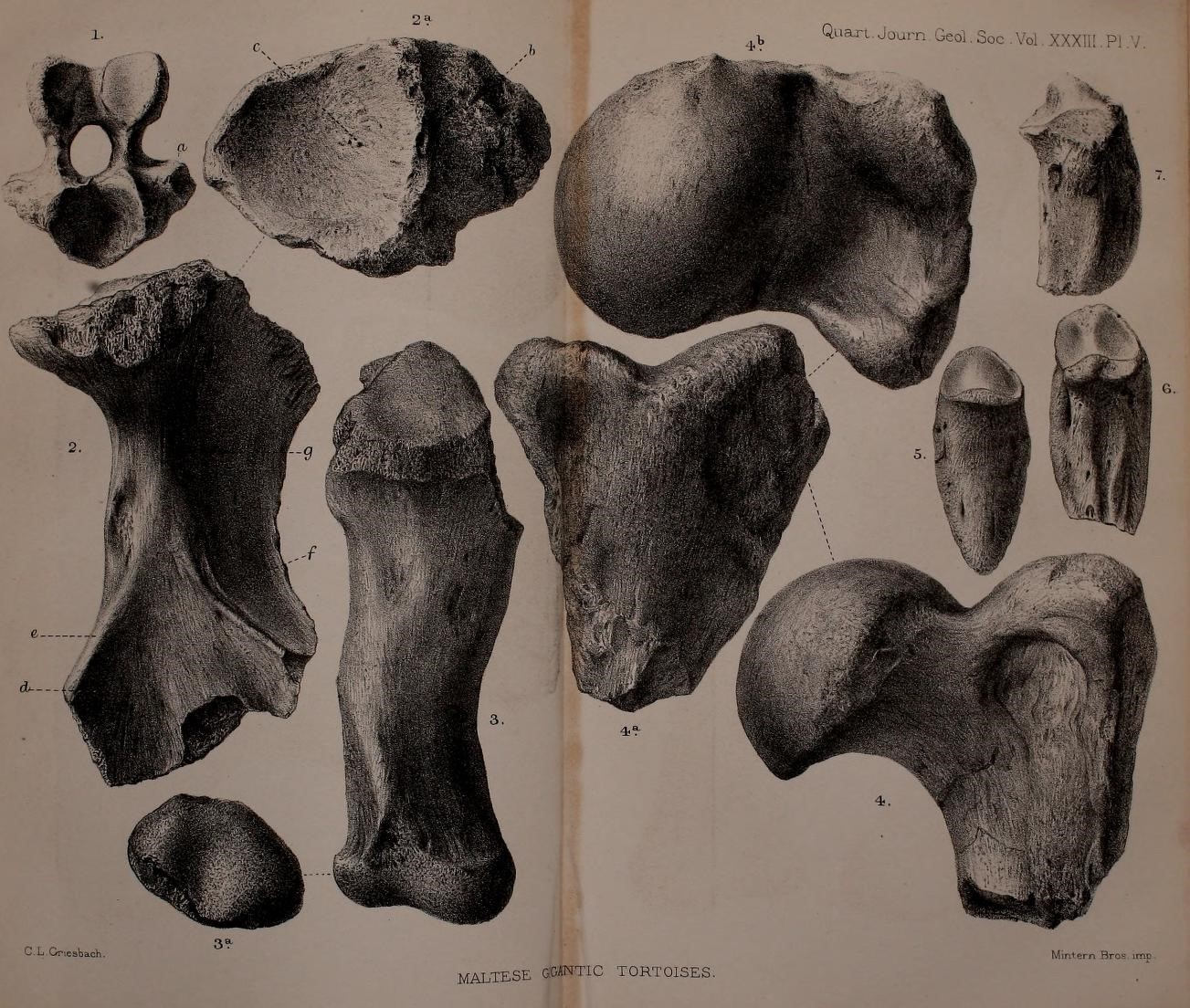
- Material of Solitudo robusta

Scientific classification
- Kingdom: Animalia
- Phylum: Chordata
- Class: Reptilia
- Order: Testudines
- Suborder: Cryptodira
- Family: Testudinidae
- Subfamily: Testudininae
- Genus: †Solitudo; Valenti et al. 2022

Type species
- †Solitudo robusta (Leith-Adams, 1877)

Other species
- †S. gymnesica (Bate, 1914); †S. sicula Valenti et al., 2022

= Solitudo =

Solitudo Temporal range: Pliocene–0.012

Extinct genus of turtle

Solitudo is an extinct genus of tortoise that was found during the Pliocene and Pleistocene on the Mediterranean islands of Menorca, Malta and Sicily. The genus includes three described species, Solitudo robusta, Solitudo gymnesica and Solitudo sicula as well as a likely fourth, undescribed species from Monte Pellegrino in Sicily. Solitudo sicula, the youngest of the species, died out approximately 12.5 thousand years BP. The largest species, Solitudo gymnesica, has been estimated to have reached a carapace length of 1.1–1.3 m (3.6–4.3 ft).

== History ==
The oldest discoveries of fossil turtles now included under Solitudo were made in the 19th century, with Leith-Adams describing remains from Zebbug Cave (Malta) as Testudo robusta. In 1914 Testudo gymnesica was described based on Pliocene material found on Menorca. Younger material was later discovered in the Zubbio di Cozzo San Pietro cave in northern Sicily. These remains, which include a femur, phalanx, pubis and an ischium, were found in what is thought to be a prehistoric funeral site, however repeated human or animal activity changed the stratigraphy of the site. Due to this the turtle remains, although suspected to have belonged to a single individual, were dispersed across the site. Additionally, these finds have been found to be unrelated to the human activity at the site, having been deposited there independently of the human remains. These remains were described in 2022 by Valenti and colleagues, who found sufficient anatomical evidence to establish a new genus they dubbed Solitudo, with "Testudo" robusta serving as the type species. The remains from Sicily were used to erect a new species, Solitudo sicula and Solitudo gymnesica became a new name for "Testudo" gymnesica from Menorca.

The name Solitudo derives from the Latin word for loneliness or solitude, which reflects the isolation of islands where members of this genus have been found. The name ending with "tudo" furthermore serves as an allusion to the genus Testudo with which the genus shares characteristics with. The species name of the youngest member, Solitudo sicula, is the female form of the Latin word for "Sicilian".

== Description ==
The different species of Solitudo differ from the tortoises of the Testudo genus mostly in the anatomy of the trochanters. In Testudo, the trochanters are fused at the proximal end of the bone through the presence of a rounded ridge which is absent in Solitudo, leaving the trochanters only incompletely fused. The femur is generally slender and its head narrower than the width between the two trochanters. Additionally, the femoral head is oriented in a 25-45° angle when viewed from above, while other genera of tortoise have femoral heads with more anteroposterior orientation.

Solitudo sicula is distinguished by the other species of the genus by having trochanters that are at the same height as the femoral head, additionally, the femoral head is also more elliptical than in more derived Solitudo species. The entire femur of S. sicula measures 104 mm (4.1 in) long, which is notably larger than that of the biggest extant tortoise of Europe, the Marginated tortoise. Assuming similar proportions, this would mean that Solitudo sicula may have reached a straight carapace length of 50–60 cm (20–24 in).

Larger sizes have been estimated for the older species. Solitudo robusta may have reached a carapace length of up to 85 cm (33 in), while some estimates suggest that Solitudo gymnesica could have reached a carapace length of 1.1–1.3 m (3.6–4.3 ft).

== Phylogeny ==
Although repeated attempts at extracting genetic material were conducted, no methods yielded DNA which rendered molecular phylogenetic analysis impossible. Due to this restriction, the relationship between Solitudo and other circum-Mediterranean tortoises was established on the basis of femur morphology, which is well known in the relevant taxa. Morphological analysis concluded that among the tortoises found around the Mediterranean, three separate femur morphotypes could be found. The "Testudinini morphotype", which is generally slender with a more narrow and oblique head, the "‘Geochelonini morphotype" which was found to be more robust and with a less oblique head and the "Insular morphotype" which typically shows a non-oblique head, slender diaphysis and trochanters that unlike in the other groups are not fully joined at the proximal end of the bone. The clade that contains all Solitudo species is based on a single synapomorphy, the incompletely fused trochanter, supported by the geographical proximity.

The Solitudo sicula is recovered in a basal position within the genus, its femur still retaining some similarities to the "Testudinini morphotype". Besides the three named species of Solitudo, a fourth, unnamed taxon from Monte Pellegrino was also found to fall within the "Insular morphotype", sharing the unfused trochanter that defines the clade. The idea that this specific morphotype is the result of the tortoise's insular habitat is dismissed on account of other insular species retaining their ancestral morphology, such as the Galápagos tortoise and Gran Canaria giant tortoise. The exact relationship between Solitudo and the other tortoises surrounding the Mediterranean remains unknown until better material, in particular fossils of the head and shell, is found.

- - Gopher tortoise (Gopherus polyphemus)
  - Testudininae
    - Solitudo
      - †Solitudo sicula
      - - †Solitudo gymnesica
        - †Solitudo robusta
        - †"Monte Pellegrino"
    - Testudinini
      - - Hermann's tortoise (Testudo hermanni)
        - Russian tortoise (Testudo horsfieldii)
      - - Greek tortoise (Testudo graeca)
        - - Egyptian tortoise (Testudo kleinmanni)
          - Marginated tortoise (Testudo marginata)
    - Geochelonini
      - Leopard tortoise (Stigmochelys pardalis)
      - †"Testudo" buchardi
      - - - African spurred tortoise (Centrochelys sulcata)
          - - - Red-footed tortoise (Chelonoidis carbonarius)
              - Yellow-footed tortoise (Chelonoidis denticulatus)
            - - Chaco tortoise (Chelonoidis chilensis)
              - Galápagos giant tortoise (Chelonoidis niger complex)
        - †Titanochelon spp.

== Paleobiology ==
Remains of Solitudo are exclusively known from Mediterranean islands. The type species, Solitudo robusta, was found on the island of Malta and has been dated to the Middle Pleistocene. Solitudo gymnesica is known from Pliocene Menorca and Solitudo sicula from Sicily. Dating the pubis of Solitudo sicula revealed that the animal lived approximately 12.5 ± 0.5 thousand years BP. Solitudo sicula would have shared its home island with the extant Hermann's Tortoise, which has been continuously present on Sicily since at least the Middle Pleistocene. There are also remains of unnamed giant tortoises found on Sicily, they were however not contemporary with Solitudo and instead correlate with the Middle Pleistocene.
