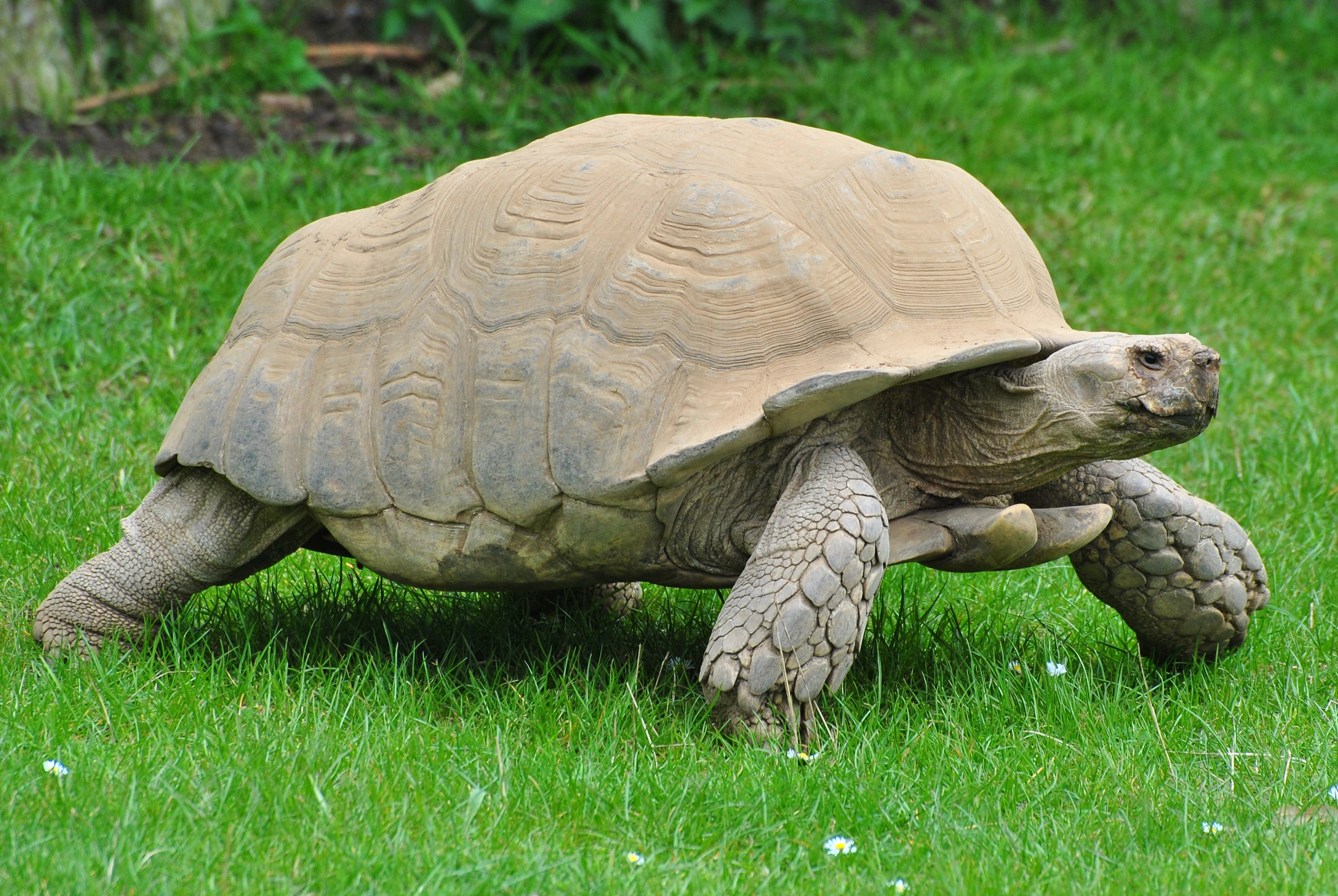
- At Linton Zoo

Conservation status
- Endangered (IUCN 3.1)

Scientific classification
- Kingdom: Animalia
- Phylum: Chordata
- Class: Reptilia
- Order: Testudines
- Suborder: Cryptodira
- Family: Testudinidae
- Genus: Centrochelys
- Species: C. sulcata

Binomial name
- Centrochelys sulcata (Miller, 1779)
- African spurred tortoise (Centrochelys sulcata) IUCN range (2020)

Synonyms
- List: Testudo sulcata Miller, 1779; Testudo calcarata Schneider, 1784; Chersine calcarata Merrem, 1820; Geochelone (Geochelone) sulcata Fitzinger, 1835; Geochelone senegalensis Fitzinger, 1855; Peltastes sulcatus Gray, 1869; Centrochelys sulcatus Gray, 1873; Centrochelys sulcata Gerlach, 2001; Geochelone sulcata senegalensis Ballasina, Vandepitte, Mochi & Fenwick, 2006; Geochelone sulcata sudanensis Ballasina, Vandepitte, Mochi & Fenwick, 2006 (nomen nudum)

= African spurred tortoise =

Species of tortoise

The African spurred tortoise (Centrochelys sulcata), also called the sulcata tortoise, is an endangered species of tortoise inhabiting the southern edge of the Sahara Desert and the Sahel. It is the largest mainland species of tortoise in Africa, and the third-largest in the world, after the Galapagos tortoise and Aldabra giant tortoise. It is the only living species in its genus, Centrochelys.

== Taxonomy and etymology ==
In 1779 the English illustrator John Frederick Miller included a hand-coloured plate of the African spurred tortoise in his Icones animalium et plantarum and coined the binomial name Testudo sulcata. Its specific name sulcata is from the Latin word sulcus meaning "furrow" and refers to the furrows on the tortoise's scales. The species was subsequently given other binomial names. There are no recognized subspecies despite there being two separate populations, one in Western Africa and the other in Eastern Africa. There are also three different, yet similar, haplotypes. One haplotype is found in and closely around Sudan, another is found in the western portion of their range, and the last haplotype is found in Senegal, Mali, and Sudan.

== Range and habitat ==
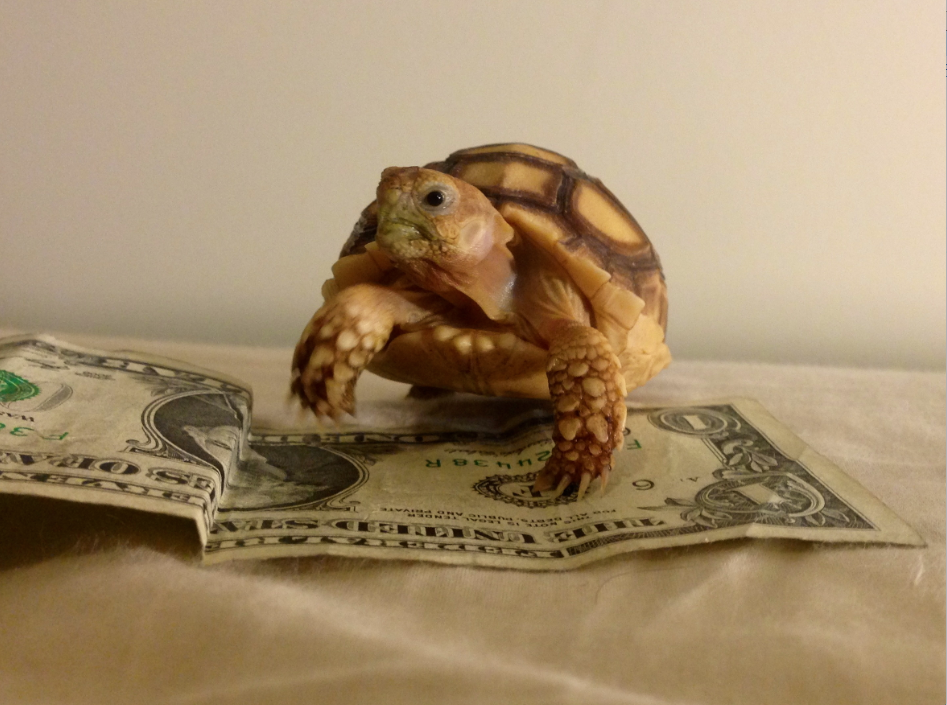
Young C. sulcata

The African spurred tortoise is native to the Sahara Desert and the Sahel, a transitional ecoregion of semiarid grasslands, savannas, and thorn shrublands found in the countries of Burkina Faso, the Central African Republic, Chad, Eritrea, Ethiopia, Mali, Mauritania, Nigeria, Senegal, Saudi Arabia, Sudan, Yemen and possibly in Somalia, Algeria, Benin, and Cameroon. It is possibly extirpated from Djibouti and Togo. They are found on hills, stable dunes, and flat areas with shrubs and high grass. They also like to settle in areas with interrupted streams or rivers. In these arid regions, the tortoise excavates burrows in the ground to get to areas with higher moisture levels, and spends the hottest part of the day in these burrows. This is known as aestivation. In the wild, they may burrow very deep, up to 15 m (49 ft) deep and 30 m (98 ft) long. Plants such as grasses and succulents grow around their burrows if kept moist, and in nature they continue to grow for the tortoise to eat if the soil is replenished with its feces. Sulcata tortoises found in the Sudanese part of their range may reach significantly greater size at maturity than those found in other regions.

== Size and lifespan ==
Males have concave plastrons

Showing sexual dimorphism

C. sulcata is the largest species of tortoise in Africa and is also third-largest species of tortoise in the world. The species is the largest of the mainland tortoises. Males have an average mass of about 81 kg (179 lb), but some males have been recorded at over 100 kg (220 lb), with one weighing more than 120 kg (260 lb). They have a straight carapace length of around 86 cm (34 in) in males. Females have a straight carapace length of about 57.8 cm (22.8 in). Males have a curved carapace length of about 101 cm (40 in) and females have approximately 67 cm (26 in) of curved carapace length. This species has spurs on their hind legs. Despite being the largest tortoise in Africa, hatchlings measure merely about 44 millimetres (1.7 in) and weigh around 40 grams (1.4 oz). They grow very quickly, reaching 6–10 in (15–25 cm) within the first few years of their lives. The tortoises grow faster when there is more rainfall and slower when there is less. They reach sexual maturity after 10 to 15 years. In captivity their life span is around 54 years. In the wild their lifespan is unknown but is believed to exceed 75 years. The tortoise has no known predators when they are hatchlings or adults. In fact it is believed that they are nearly immune to predators when their weight exceeds 30 kg (66 lb). On the other hand tortoise eggs are sought after by many predators such as numerous species of lizards and potentially mongooses. In the wild the leading cause of death is being unable to right themselves after they have been flipped onto their backs, chiefly as a result of fighting between adult males. They have unique scute patterns.

== Diet ==
A sulcata tortoise with a deformed shell due to the lack of proper care

Sulcata tortoises are mostly herbivores. Primarily, their diets consist of many types of grasses, plants (especially succulent plants), and hay. Flowers and other plants, including cactus pads, can be consumed. In the wild, they have been observed to also eat plants and algae off the surface of the water. African spurred tortoises are also capable of eating various vegetables such as endive, dandelion greens, and dark leafy greens. Despite being herbivores, they will occasionally eat the carcasses of dead animals. They mostly eat dead goats and zebras that have been pushed downstream during the wet season on the rivers and streams next to which tortoises settle. If a human settlement is nearby they will also feed on refuse.

Their overall diet should be high in fiber and very low in protein. Too much protein will lead to the tortoise growing too fast, which can result in metabolic bone disease, a condition that is characterized by distortion of the skeleton and weakened bone structure and can lead to lameness, lower quality of life, and/or shortened lifespan.

== Breeding ==
Copulation

=== Male selection ===
Copulation takes place right after the rainy season, during the months from September through November with breeding actions occurring in the morning. Male C. sulcata are extremely territorial. Males combat each other for breeding rights with the females and are vocal during copulation. Larger males tend to win sexual combat.

=== Female nesting ===
Sixty days after mating, the female begins to roam, looking for suitable nesting sites. For five to 15 days, four or five nests may be excavated before she selects the perfect location in which the eggs will be laid. Females tend to lay two or three clutches of eggs, with each clutch containing 14 to 40 eggs.

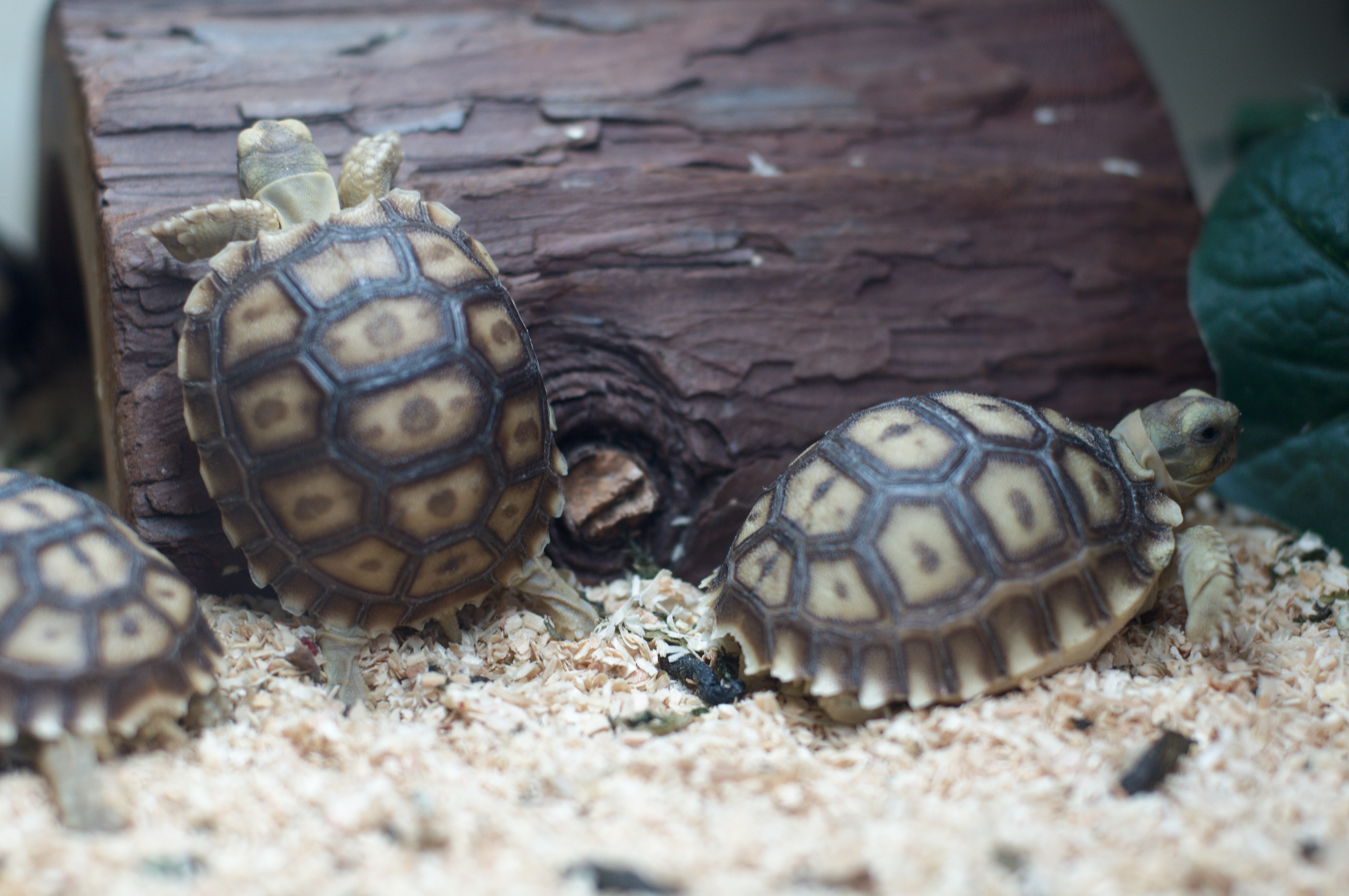
Immature Centrochelys sulcata in East Bay Vivarium

Loose soil is kicked out of the depression, and the female may frequently urinate into the depression. Once it reaches about 2 feet (61 cm) in diameter and 3–6 in (8–15 cm) deep, a further depression, measuring some 8 in (20 cm) across and in depth, will be dug out towards the back of the original depression. The work of digging the nest may take up to five hours; the speed with which it is dug seems to be dependent upon the relative hardness of the ground. It usually takes place when the ambient air temperature is at least 78 °F (26 °C). Once the nest is dug, the female begins to lay an egg every three minutes. Clutches may contain 15–30 or more eggs. After the eggs are laid, the female fills in the nest, taking an hour or more to fully cover them all. Incubation should be 86 to 88 °F (30 to 31 °C) and will take from 90 to 120 days.

== Conservation status and efforts ==
=== Status ===
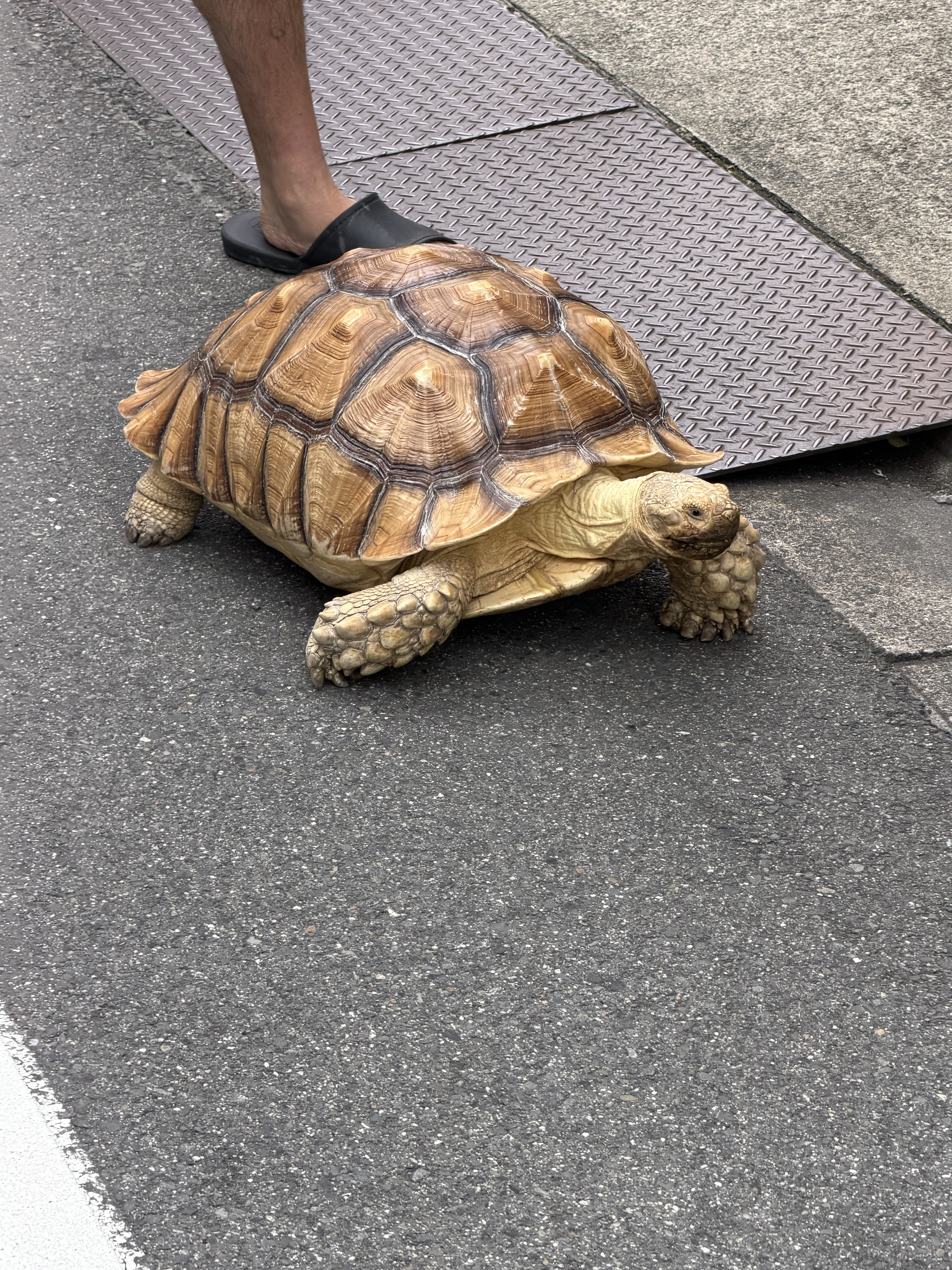
An African spurred tortoise on the streets of Kyoto, Japan

C. sulcata is currently ranked as an endangered species. Studies suggest that African spurred tortoises exist in approximately 16.7% of the area where they had previously been found. These studies also show an average of 1–5 tortoises per site canvassed which indicates a rapid decline of the species. The species faces threats from livestock as they have to compete for resources. The main source of resource competition African spurred tortoises face is from cattle which also graze on grass. The effects of competition for grazing land is compounded by wildfires which can destroy large portions of grass land which kills and reduces the resources available to C. sulcata. They also face threats from the pet trade as they are over harvested from their natural environment. According to the CITES database, 9,132 African spurred tortoises were taken from the wild for the pet trade between 1990–2010. However, this number likely significantly underestimates the actual number of tortoises taken from the wild. This is especially concerning given that the African spurred tortoise has delayed sexual maturity. This means that if the tortoises are captured and removed from the wild under the age of sexual maturity, estimated by some to be 15 years, they will not have been able to reproduce and contribute to the population of their species in the wild. Other threats that the species face are habitat loss due to climate change and predators which hunt the tortoises or their eggs. The situation has grown so severe that "The spurred tortoise is now apparently rare in nearly all sites where it is known to occur."

=== Efforts ===
The main method of conservation has been reintroduction programs. These sorts of reintroduction programs have been implemented in Ferlo, and Senegal. These programs have seen tortoise survival rates of about 80%. This means that the tortoises are able to easily to adapt back into their native savanna environments from domestic environment. There are also captive colonies in several countries. Most of these reintroduction programs and captive colonies can be found in protected national parks and wildlife sanctuaries. There are hopes to expand reintroduction programs by involving tortoise owners since there are more African spurred tortoises living in captivity than in the wild. The goal would be to establish a breeding program with the owners where all hatchlings would be reintroduced.

== Life in captivity ==
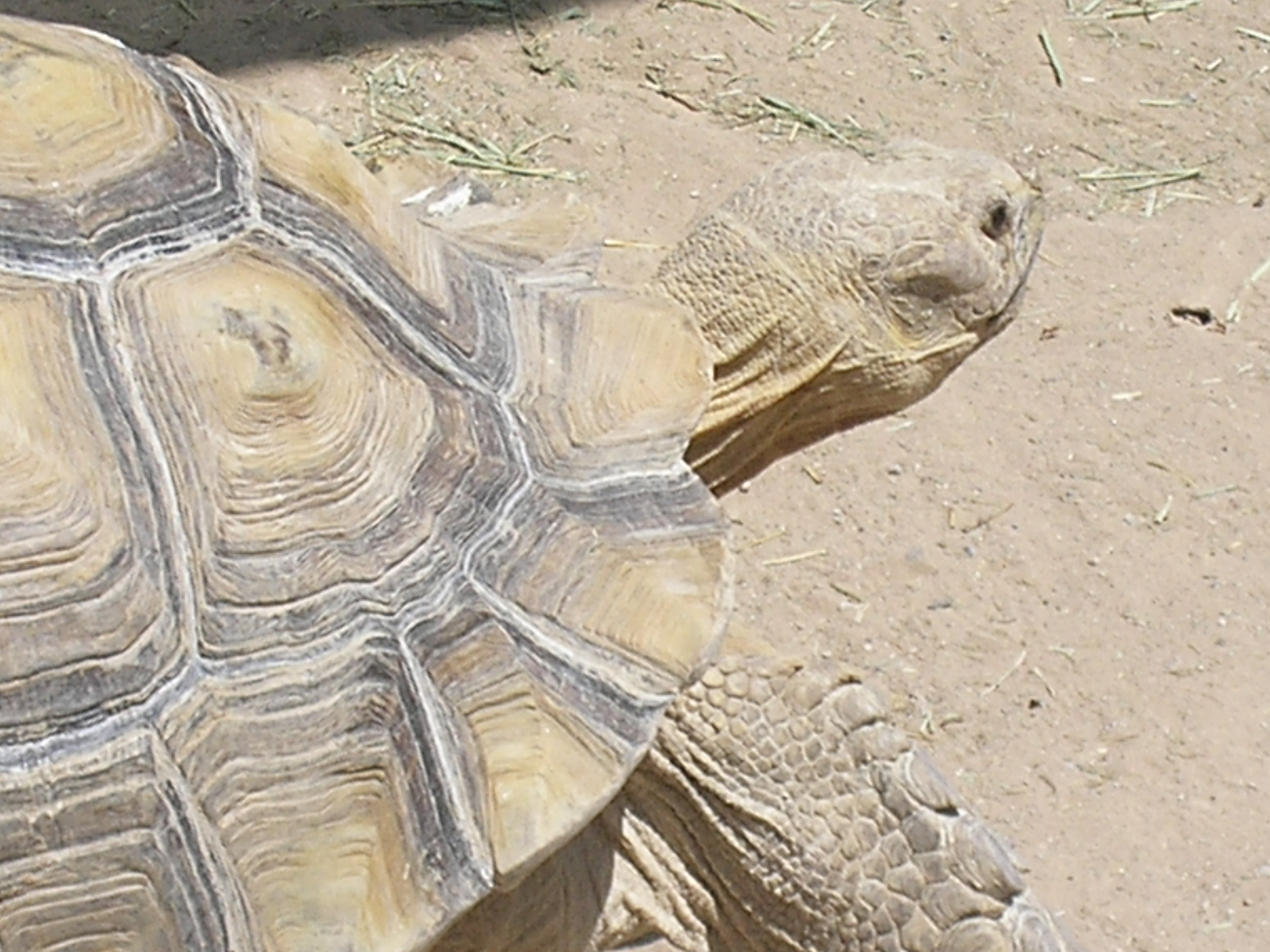
African spurred tortoise at the Las Vegas Zoo

=== Behavior ===
African spurred tortoises are passive and docile pets. They are almost never aggressive and barely ever show territorial behavior. This docile behavior is complemented by their slow speed and silence. Despite their docile attitude, the tortoises should not be handled often as handling will cause stress, which can lead to health problems and premature death. Being off the ground or constantly carried can cause them to become stressed. Stressed tortoises may urinate or defecate, try to get away, hide in the shell, and hiss. They are also very curious and can end up stuck on their backs, needing help getting flipped back over. African spurred totoises have a lifespan of around 70 years, which means that they are a long term commitment.

=== Requirements ===
The ideal enclosure for the African spurred tortoise is an outdoor pen where they will be able to construct a burrow. A fence of about 2 feet (0.61 m) in height is recommended with some parts of the fence being extended underground. They prefer high temperatures and thrive in temperatures as high as 100 °F (38 °C) when they have a burrow to go into to cool off. When in captivity they should also have access to heating systems to keep the temperature of an enclosure above 60 °F (16 °C) when the temperature drops during the night. If the tortoise is being kept inside it needs access to artificial means of sunlight. The enclosure should also be kept somewhat humid. Humidity should be kept around 40–50 percent, as higher humidity may cause respiratory issues. These tend to be fungal infections, but shell rot is also common.

They require high-fiber diets (grasses and hays), as many "wet" vegetables can cause health problems in large quantities. Red leaf lettuce, prickly pear cactus pads, hibiscus leaves, hay from various grasses, and dandelions are some of the better foods to make up the bulk of their diet. They will attempt to eat most types of plants eventually and some common garden plants, such as azaleas, can be very toxic to them. They will eat such things as caterpillars and snails if given the opportunity, but this also should be a very small portion of their diet. Calcium should also be another small portion of their diet to help with shell growth. The tortoises should also avoid proteins and consume fruits very sparsely. As the tortoises get older and their jaws stronger, it is recommended to allow them to eat hays such as orchard and timothy hay. Certain vegetables can lead to serious medical issues. Parsley, broccoli, kale and spinach should be excluded from their diets entirely, as they are too high in calcium oxalate.
