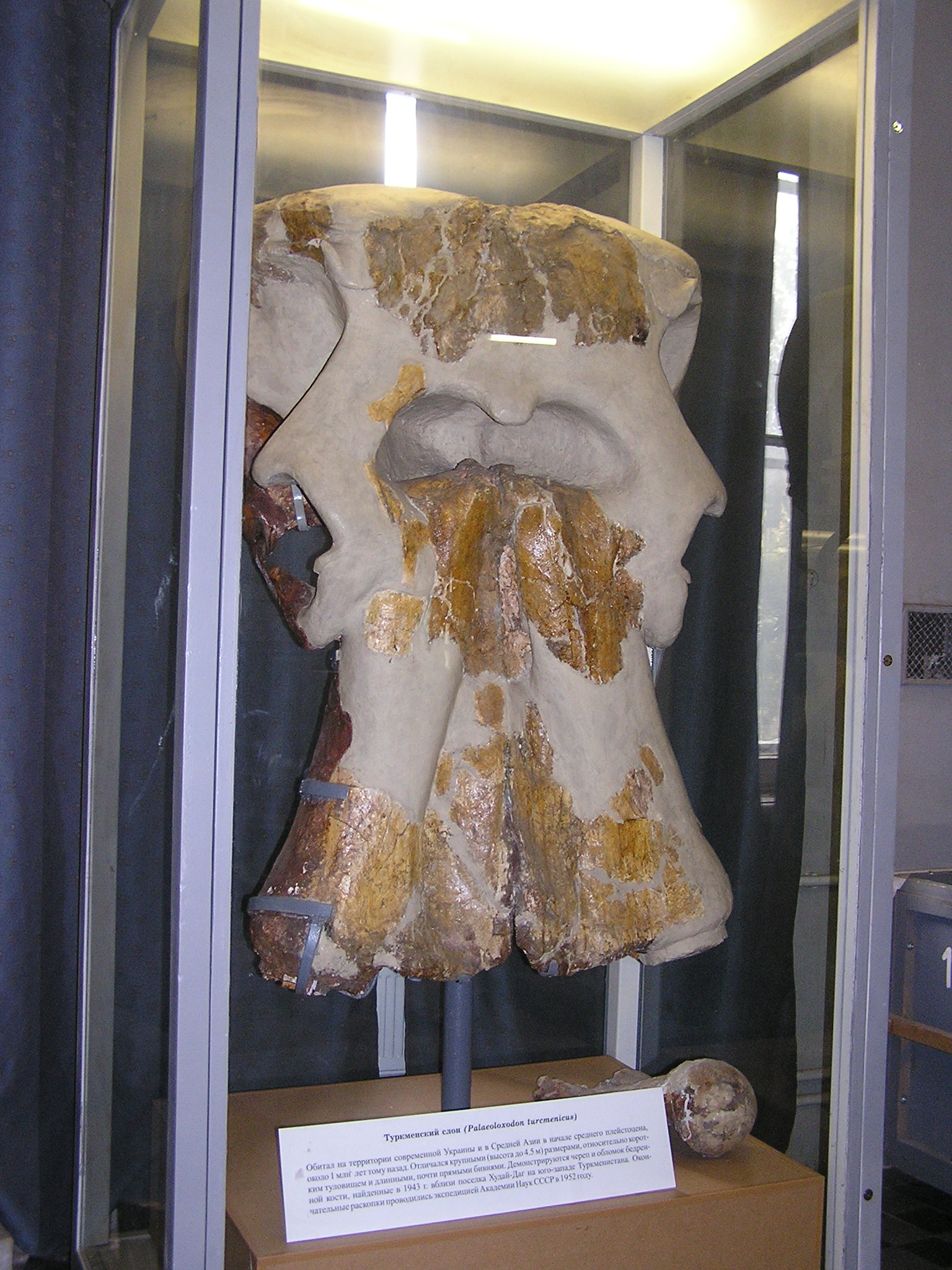
- Holotype skull

Scientific classification
- Kingdom: Animalia
- Phylum: Chordata
- Class: Mammalia
- Order: Proboscidea
- Family: Elephantidae
- Genus: †Palaeoloxodon
- Species: †P. turkmenicus

Binomial name
- †Palaeoloxodon turkmenicus Dubrovo, 1955

= Palaeoloxodon turkmenicus =

Palaeoloxodon turkmenicus Temporal range: Middle Pleistocene

Extinct species of mammal

Palaeoloxodon turkmenicus is an extinct species of elephant belonging to the genus Palaeoloxodon, known from the Middle Pleistocene of Central Asia and South Asia.

== Taxonomy ==
The species was described in 1955 based on a partial adult skull (ZIN 27052), as well as an associated atlas vertebra and partial femur, found in Khuday-Dag near Krasnovodsk in what is now western Turkmenistan (then the Turkmen Soviet Socialist Republic in the Soviet Union) in Central Asia, dating to the early Middle Pleistocene. Its validity was historically considered uncertain, with a 2004 study suggesting that it was a synonym of the largely European straight-tusked elephant (Palaeoloxodon antiquus). In 2024, a skull of a mature bull (WMNH-VP-F1), around 45-55 years of age was attributed to the species from Galandhar near Pampore in the Kashmir Valley, Jammu and Kashmir, India (probably also of Middle Pleistocene age), with this study affirming the validity of P. turkmenicus as a distinct species of Palaeoloxodon. Other remains from the site probably attributable to the specimen include the mandibles, the altas, a partial scapula, some fragmentary thoracic vertebrae, ribs and limb bone fragments, with the fragmentary remains of several other elephants (including a juvenile) also known from the site. The 2024 study proposed that Palaeoloxodon turkmenicus may represent the ancestor of other Eurasian Palaeoloxodon species, but noted that given the current paucity of skull remains of early Middle Pleistocene Palaeoloxodon that this hypothesis was tentative.

== Description ==
The species had a large body size, comparable to that of other mainland Eurasian Palaeoloxodon species. In contrast to most other Eurasian species of Palaeoloxodon (such as the European Palaeoloxodon antiquus and the South Asian Palaeoloxodon namadicus) the parietal-occipital crest in the forehead region of the skull is only weakly developed, similar to the African-West Asian Palaeoloxodon recki, with the anatomy of the stylohyoid bone found at Pampore strongly differing from that of P. recki, P. antiquus and the Japanese P. naumanni, supporting its placement as a distinct species.

== Ecology ==
Remains of other animals found in India at the Pampore site include those of the Kashmir stag (Cervus hanglu).

== Relationship with humans ==
The elephants at Pampore were found to have had their bones deliberately fractured by archaic humans via hammering using stone tools, possibly for the purposes of extracting marrow. At the site stone tools made of basalt were found, which were likely used for butchery. These tools were made using stone-knapping techniques reminiscent of the Levallois type, suggesting a late Middle Pleistocene age (possibly around 400-300,000 years ago) for the site. There is no evidence that the elephants were hunted, and they may have been scavenged after dying of natural causes. Abnormal bone growth within the sinuses suggests that the main Pampore bull had a severe, perhaps septic chronic sinus infection at the time of its death.
