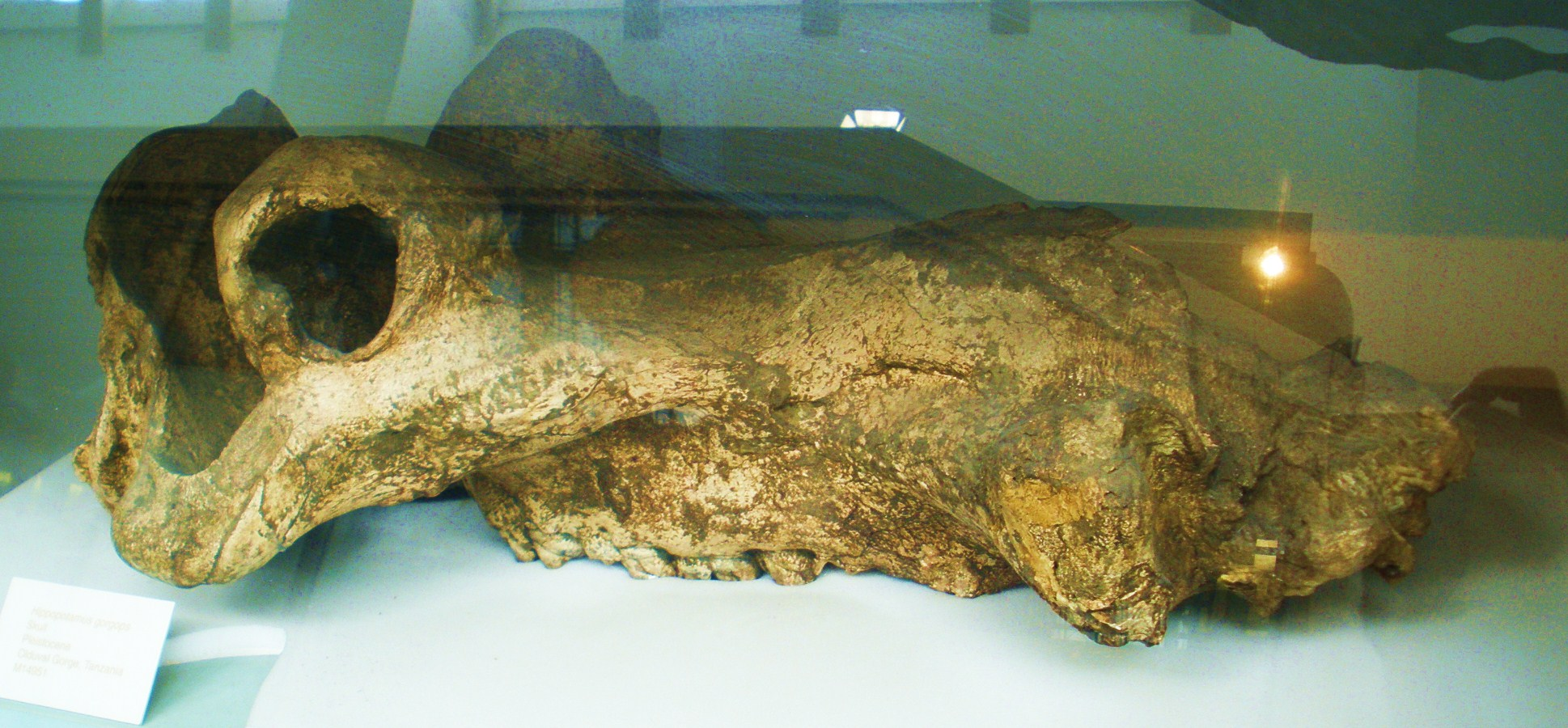

Scientific classification
- Kingdom: Animalia
- Phylum: Chordata
- Class: Mammalia
- Order: Artiodactyla
- Family: Hippopotamidae
- Genus: Hippopotamus
- Species: †H. gorgops

Binomial name
- †Hippopotamus gorgops Dietrich, 1928

= Hippopotamus gorgops =

Hippopotamus gorgops Temporal range: Early Pleistocene–Middle Pleistocene

Extinct species of mammal

Hippopotamus gorgops is an extinct species of the genus Hippopotamus known from remains found in Northern Africa, Eastern Africa, and the Levant. One of the largest hippopotamus species, it first appeared during the Early Pleistocene, and became extinct during the early Middle Pleistocene. It has been suggested to be a synonym of H. antiquus.

== Taxonomy ==
The species was described by German scientist Wilhelm Otto Dietrich in 1928. It is closely related and possibly ancestral to the large European species Hippopotamus antiquus. H. gorgops has been suggested to be a synonym of H. antiquus due to its arbitrary split purely based on geography and because of a significant morphological overlap between the two species.

== Distribution ==
Hippopotamus gorgops is known from remains found across Northern and Eastern Africa, spanning from Early Pleistocene, at or shortly after 2 million years ago, to the latest Early Pleistocene-early Middle Pleistocene, around 1-0.5 million years ago. The species dispersed to North Africa around 1.9-1.8 million years ago. The species, along with other hippopotamids, was abundant at the Buia locality in present-day Eritrea, dating to around 1 million years ago. Remains assigned to H. gorgops alongside the species H. behemoth are known from the Ubeidiya locality in Israel, dating to approximately 1.6 million years ago, with some authors suggesting that H. behemoth is actually a synonym of H. gorgops, given their similar morphology.

== Description ==
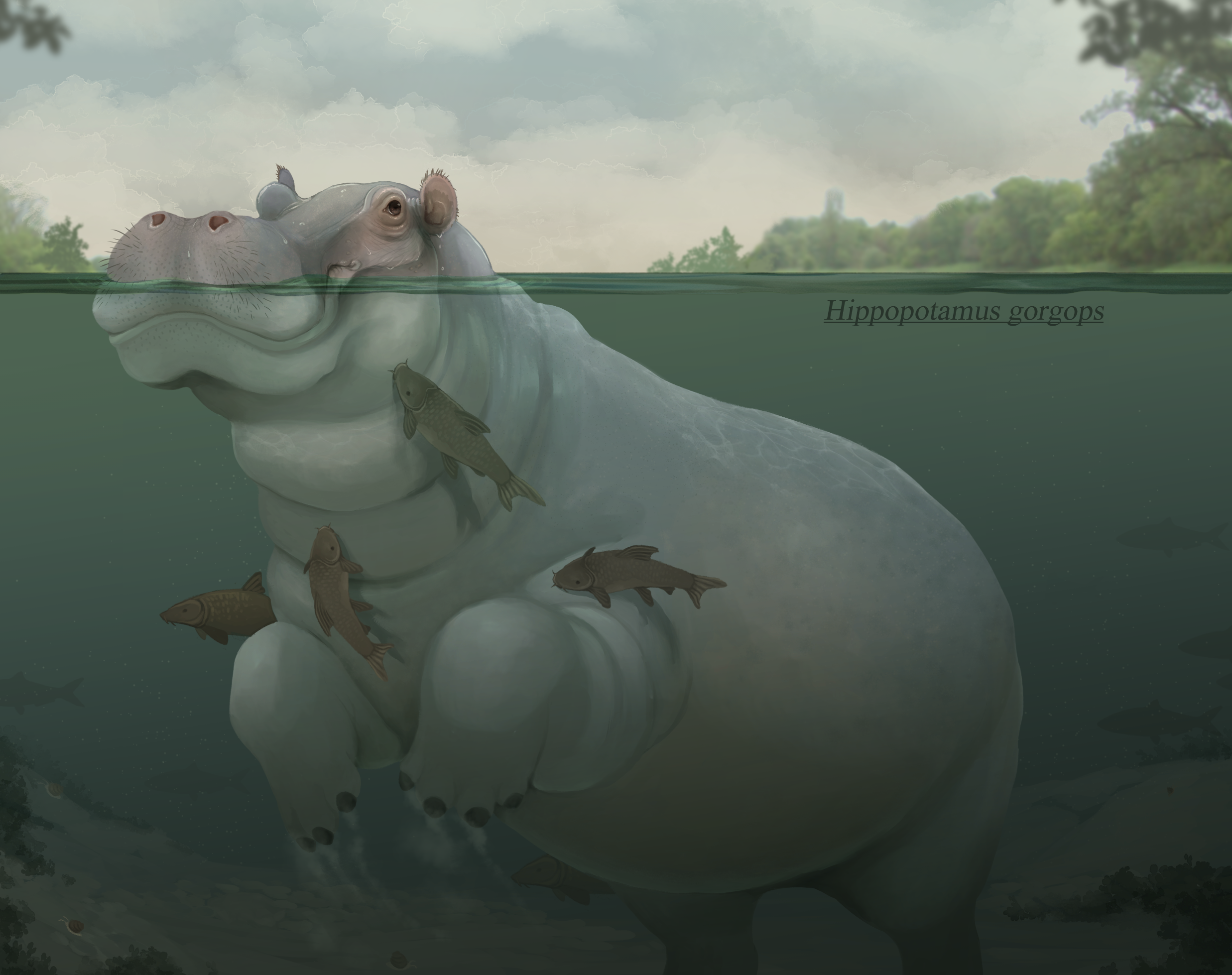
Life restoration showing the raised eye sockets

H. gorgops grew substantially larger than the living hippopotamus (H. amphibius), Martínez-Navarro (2010) suggested that H. gorgops was at least twice the size of H. amphibius. Hutchinson (2021) cited Martínez-Navarro (2010) as the source of the body mass of H. gorgops, estimating that the species weighed over 4,000 kilograms (8,800 lb). ^{Including supplemental table S1} However, Martínez-Navarro (2010) only estimated the body mass of the closely related Hippopotamus antiquus, not H. gorgops itself. Romano et al. (2024) criticized the body mass estimate provided by Martínez-Navarro (2010). They argued that classic regression formulas lead to very wide ranges of body mass, which often lead to inconsistent values.

In comparison to H. amphibius, the orbits and nasal openings are elevated higher above the rest of the skull, with the temporal fossa being shorter, resulting in the distance between the orbits and occiput being shorter. This likely meant a more forward attachment of the temporal muscles. The nuchal and sagittal crests were also proportionally taller, and the palate was elongate. The teeth were high crowned (hypsodont). A juvenile (aged approximately 7 years) skull from Buia demonstrates that the distinctive traits of the skull anatomy developed early during ontogeny. In life H. gorgops would have likely greatly resembled H. amphibius.

== Ecology ==
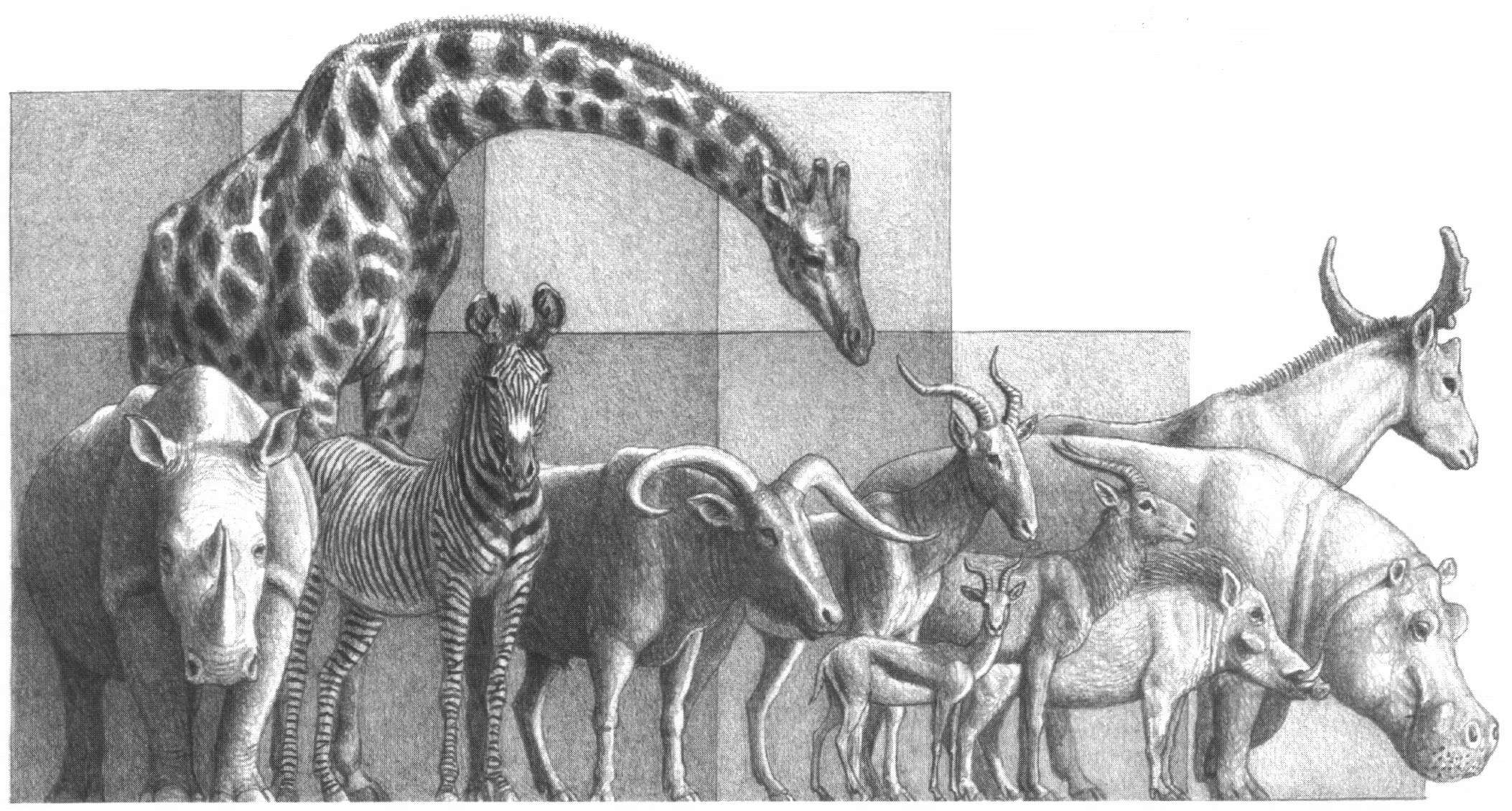
Ungulates from the Pleistocene of Eastern Africa, including H. gorgops (right)

Isotopic analysis of specimens from the Lake Turkana Basin suggests a high consumption of C4 plants. For specimens from Olduvai Gorge in Tanzania, dental microwear suggests a mixed feeding diet (including both browse and grass), while mesowear suggests a largely grazing diet. The elevated orbits have led to suggestions of a more aquatic lifestyle than H. amphibius, though its robust limbs indicate that it was probably capable of moving efficiently on land, like H. amphibius.

== Relationship with humans ==
Remains with cut or fracture marks from sites across Africa from the Early Pleistocene indicate that H. gorgops was butchered by archaic humans. These include El-Kherba in Algeria, dating to around 1.8 million years ago (mya), Kilombe caldera in Kenya, dating to around 1.76 mya, and the Buia site in Eritrea dating to the late Early Pleistocene, around 1 mya. Often at these sites tools from the Oldowan industry are present. At Kilombe and Buia, it is unclear whether the hippos were hunted or scavenged. It is unlikely that healthy adult individuals were hunted, as with living hippopotamuses, they were likely dangerous.

At the T69 Complex in Olduvai Gorge, Tanzania, dating to around 1.5 million years ago, archaic humans using Acheulean tools knapped Hippopotamus cf. gorgops bones along with those of the large elephant Elephas cf. recki to create bone tools. As of 2025, these are currently the oldest known bone tools.
