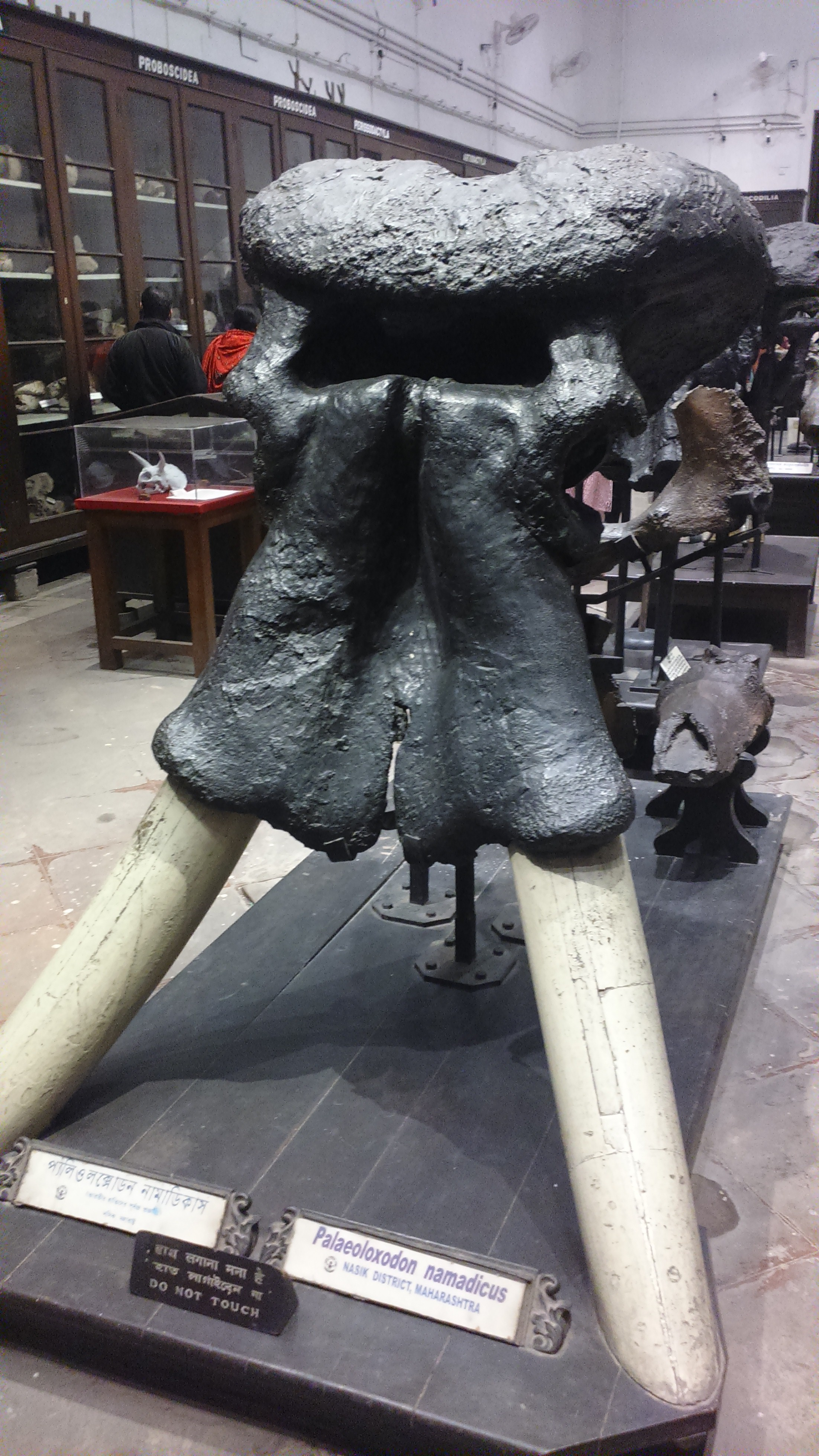
- Skull at the Indian Museum, Kolkata

Scientific classification
- Kingdom: Animalia
- Phylum: Chordata
- Class: Mammalia
- Order: Proboscidea
- Family: Elephantidae
- Genus: †Palaeoloxodon
- Species: †P. namadicus

Binomial name
- †Palaeoloxodon namadicus (Falconer & Cautley, 1846)

Synonyms
- Elephas namadicus Falconer & Cautley, 1846; Sivalikia namadicus Osborn, 1924; Loxodonta (Palaeoloxodon) namadicus Matsuomoto, 1929

= Palaeoloxodon namadicus =

Palaeoloxodon namadicus Temporal range: Middle Pleistocene–Late Pleistocene

Extinct species of elephant

Palaeoloxodon namadicus is an extinct species of prehistoric elephant known from the Middle Pleistocene to Late Pleistocene of the Indian subcontinent, and possibly also elsewhere in Asia. The species grew larger than any living elephant, and is one of the largest known proboscideans alongside the mastodon "Mammut" borsoni. Speculative estimates based on a lost, fragmentary, femur – measured in the 19th century – has led some authors to suggest that P. namadicus may have been larger than Paraceratherium, generally considered the largest known land mammal ever.

== Taxonomic history ==
Remains now recognised as belonging to P. namadicus were unearthed during the rule of the British East India Company in India at least as early as the 1830s, with an 1834 publication in the Journal of the Asiatic Society of Bengal by James Prinsep noting the discovery of giant elephant remains in Sagauni in what is now Narsinghpur district, Madhya Pradesh that had been reported by Dr George Green Spilsbury, the existence of which had been revealed to Spilsbury by a local native carpenter. The species was named as Elephas namadicus by British paleontologists Hugh Falconer and Proby Cautley in 1846, based on a skull collected from the valley of the Godavari River in central India. In 1924, American paleontologist Henry Fairfield Osborn placed it within the newly coined genus Sivalika. Also in that year, Japanese paleontologist Matsumoto Hikoshichirō placed it within his newly coined subgenus Palaeoloxodon, which he placed within Loxodonta (which contains the living African elephants), with the type species being the Japanese Loxodonta (Palaeoloxodon) naumanni, which had previously been named also in 1924 as a subspecies of P. namadicus.

In his posthumous 1942 monograph, Osborn placed the species within Palaeoloxodon, which he regarded as a genus in its own right rather than as a subgenus, with both positions widely supported by modern authors. A number of authors, including Vincent J. Maglio in his widely referenced 1973 work Origin and Evolution of the Elephantidae, have historically regarded P. namadicus and the largely European straight-tusked elephant (P. antiquus) as the same species due to their similar skull and tooth morphology. (Note: while the name "straight-tusked elephant" properly refers to P. antiquus, some authors also refer to other species of Palaeoloxodon including P. namadicus as "straight-tusked elephants") This was questioned by later authors and the two species are now generally considered distinct.

== Description ==
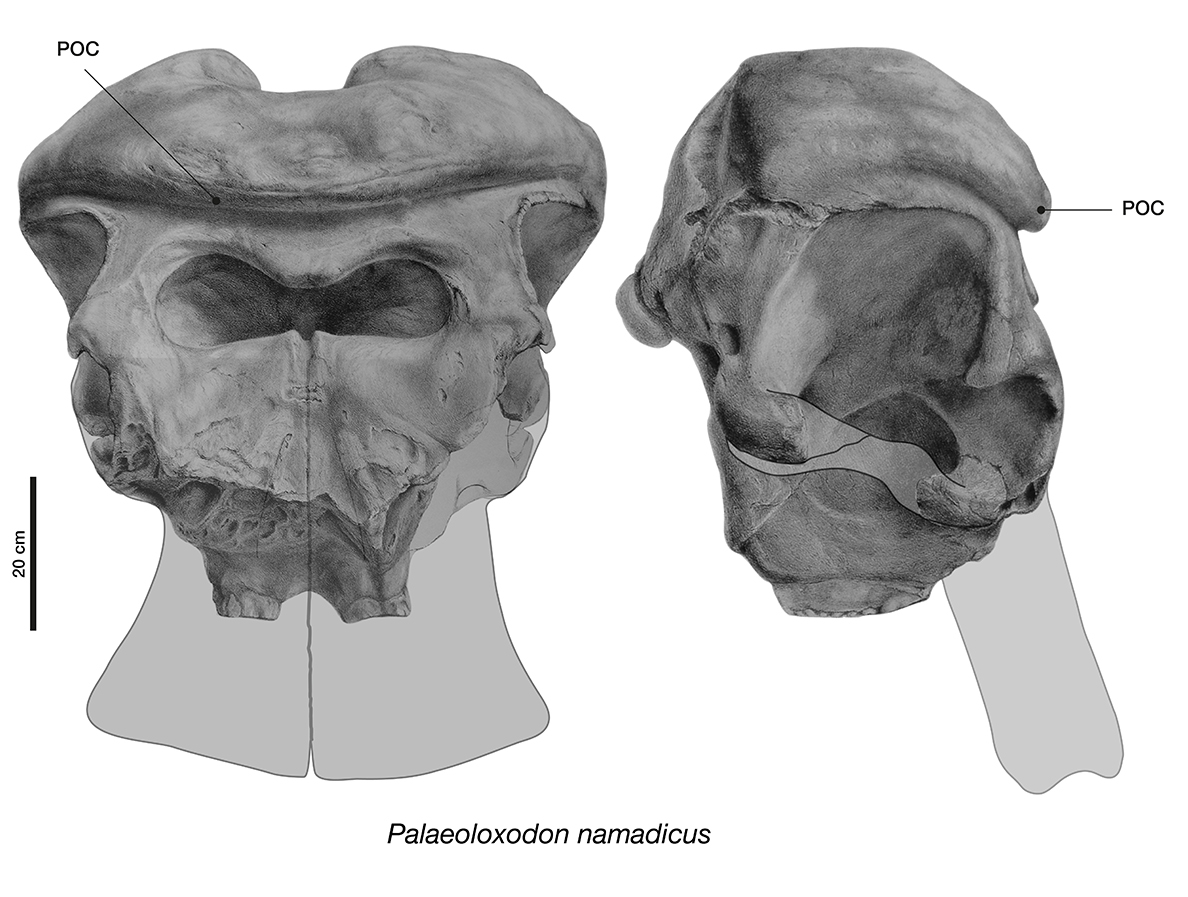
Diagram of a partial skull of a mature female (NHMUK PV M3092) in front-on and side-on views, with the parietal-occipital crest (POC) labeled and reconstructed parts in light grey

P. namadicus shares similarities to other species of Palaeoloxodon, which includes a large growth of bone (the parieto-occipital crest) at the top of the skull that overhangs the forehead region, which likely anchored the splenius muscles used to support the head. This structure is more developed in males than in females. Recent research has suggested that P. namadicus can be distinguished from P. antiquus by its less robust (proportionally more slender) limb bones and more stout cranium (including a better developed parieto-occipital crest), and the presence of a teardrop shaped indentation/depression in the infraorbital region behind the eyesocket not found in P. antiquus.

Palaeoloxodon turkmenicus, also known from the Indian subcontinent, is distinguished from P. namadicus by its much more weakly developed parietal-occipital crest. Like other large Palaeoloxodon species, the tusks of P. namadicus were proportionally large, though no complete tusks are known. One partial tusk was estimated to be 3.66 metres (12.0 ft) long and over 120 kilograms (260 lb) in weight when complete, larger than the largest recorded African bush elephant tusk.

=== Size ===
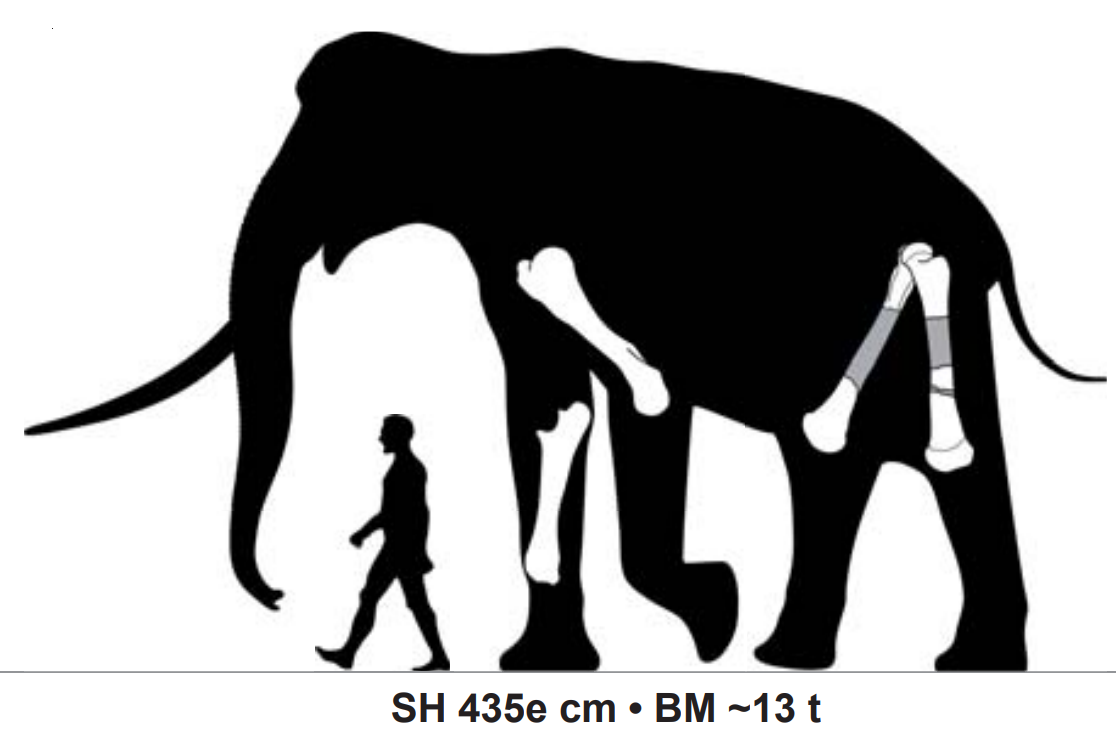
Size comparison of the Sagauni 1 specimen, estimated to be 4.35 metres (14.3 ft) tall, compared to a 1.8 metres (5 ft 11 in) tall human

Like living elephants, Palaeoloxodon namadicus is thought to have been sexually dimorphic, with males considerably larger than females, with the skull of a P. namadicus male found in the Godavari valley described in 1905 being a full 40% larger than that of a mature female (NHMUK PV M3092, which is now the lectotype specimen from which the species is defined).

Palaeoloxodon namadicus is the largest species in the genus Palaeoloxodon and one of the largest known proboscideans along with the mastodon "Mammut" borsoni, and considerably larger than living elephants. A 2015 study by Asier Larramendi attempted to estimate the size of P. namadicus, as well as other prehistoric proboscideans. Based on a fragmentary skeleton of an adult male, comprising two femurs (the left one of which was measured to be 1.6 metres (5.2 ft) in length when excavated in 1834), a left ulna and a right humerus, from Sagauni, Larramendi extrapolated a shoulder height of 4.35 metres (14.3 ft) and a weight of 13 tonnes (29,000 lb) for this individual.

A fragmentary lower portion of a femur described in 1834 in the same publication that described the femurs of the Sagauni specimen, stated that this femur was almost a quarter larger than that from Sagauni. Assuming it was about 20% larger, Larramendi calculated an extrapolated femur length of 1.9 metres (6.2 ft) and a speculative size estimate of 5.2 m (17 ft 1 in) tall at the shoulder and 22 tonnes (49,000 lb) in body mass, which if correct would make P. namadicus possibly the largest land mammal ever, exceeding even paraceratheres in size (the largest specimens of Paraceratherium transouralicum were estimated to weigh 17.1 tonnes (38,000 lb) in the same study). However, Larramendi stated that this estimate should be "taken with a grain of salt" (treated with caution), as they could not locate the specimen, but speculated that it may be stored in the Indian Museum of Kolkata.

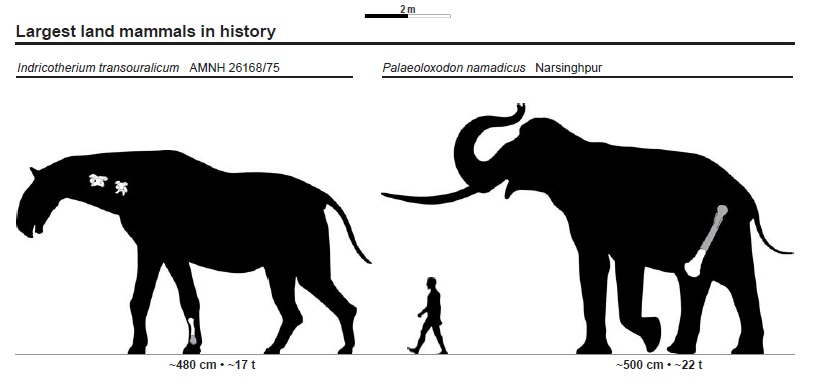
Highly speculative size estimate of P. namadicus based on a lost partial femur measured in the 19th century, compared to the largest known specimen of the paracerathere Paraceratherium transouralicum (labelled as Indricotherium transouralicum)

In 2023, a publication by Gregory S. Paul and Larramendi estimated that another specimen identified as cf. P. namadicus, also only known from a partial femur, would have weighed 18–19 tonnes (40,000–42,000 lb). Other authors have noted that weight estimates for proboscideans based on single bones can lead to estimates that are "highly improbable" compared to accurate estimates from complete skeletons. In 2024, Biswas, Chang and Tsai estimated a maximum shoulder height of 4.51 metres (14.8 ft) and body masses between 13.22 to 18.47 tonnes (29,100 to 40,700 lb) for 5 specimens of P. namadicus from the Indian subcontinent. ^{including supplemental table S4}

== Ecology ==
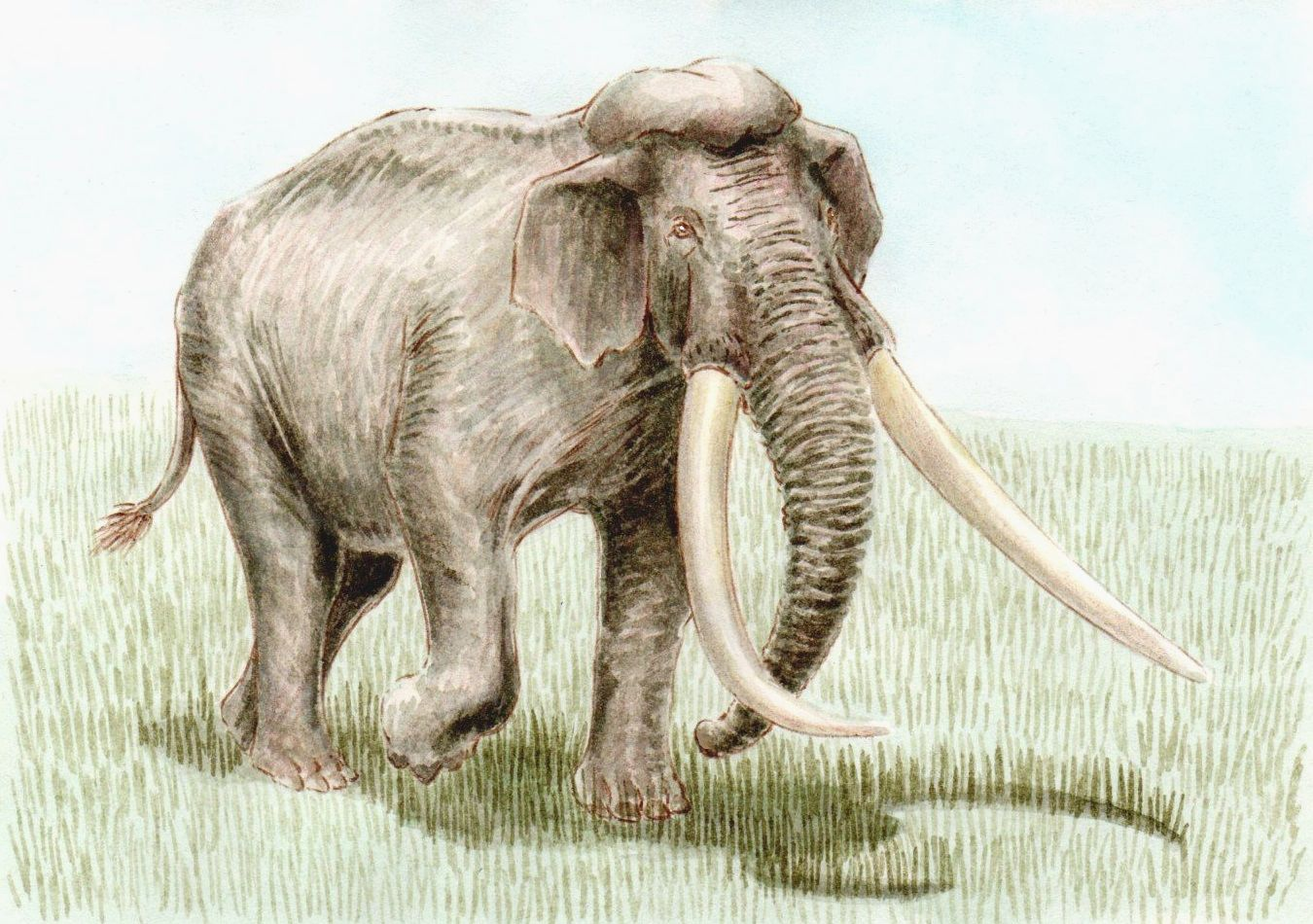
Life restoration

Fossils of Palaeoloxodon namadicus are known from the northern and central Indian subcontinent, including the Narmada and Godavari valleys, and the Indo-Gangetic Plain. Isolated teeth have also been reported from the vicinity of Kuruwita in Sri Lanka. Based on stable isotope ratios of carbon and oxygen and the morphology of their teeth, it is suggested that P. namadicus had a grazing to grazing predominant mixed feeding (both browsing and grazing) diet, with a specimen found on the banks of the Dhasan River suggested to have primarily consumed C_{4} grasses.

The species is suggested to have primarily inhabited open grassland habitats. Its arrival on the subcontinent coincides with a shift in the diet of contemporaneous Elephas hysudricus (the ancestor of the living Asian elephant) from a grazing diet towards browsing-mixed feeding, possibly as a result of niche partitioning. Species of Palaeoloxodon probably had similar social behaviour to living elephants, with females and juveniles living in matriarchal (female-led) herds, while males left these herds to live solitarily upon reaching adolescence around 14–15 years of age.

== Evolution and extinction ==
P. namadicus is primarily known from the Indian subcontinent. Remains attributed to P. namadicus have also been reported across Southeast Asia (including Malaysia, Myanmar, Laos, and Vietnam, and the island of Sulawesi in Indonesia) and as well as China. However, the status of Chinese Palaeoloxodon is unresolved, with other authors considering the remains to belong to P. naumanni (otherwise known from Japan, and originally described as subspecies of P. namadicus) or the separate species P. huaihoensis. The postcranial remains of Palaeoloxodon from China are substantially more robust than Indian P. namadicus and in many respects are more similar to those of P. antiquus and their skulls lack the infraorbital depression characteristic of Indian P. namadicus specimens, making their referral to P. namadicus questionable. By the early 2020s, it was generally considered that Chinese Palaeoloxodon remains are more closely related or even attributable to the largely European P. antiquus, rather than to P. namadicus.

P. namadicus is thought to have ultimately evolved, like other Eurasian Palaeoloxodon species from a migration of a population of Palaeoloxodon recki out of Africa. The earliest records of Palaeoloxodon in the Indian subcontinent are uncertain, though date to sometime in the Middle Pleistocene, with most remains of Palaeoloxodon in the Indian subcontinent from the late Middle Pleistocene onwards having the characteristic skull morphology of P. namadicus. Palaeoloxodon namadicus is thought to have become extinct during the Late Pleistocene, making it one of four megafauna species native to the Indian subcontinent suggested to have become extinct during the Late Pleistocene, alongside fellow proboscidean Stegodon namadicus, the equine Equus namadicus, and the hippopotamus Hexaprotodon, along with the local extinction of ostriches, as part of the Late Quaternary extinction event during the Late Pleistocene, where most large mammals globally became extinct. The exact time of extinction of these taxa is unclear due to the uncertainties regarding dating, but indirect dating from several sites suggests that P. namadicus became extinct within the last 50,000 years, with some records possibly as late as 25,000 years ago, implying that P. namadicus overlapped with modern humans in the region. There is little to no current evidence of human interaction with P. namadicus.
