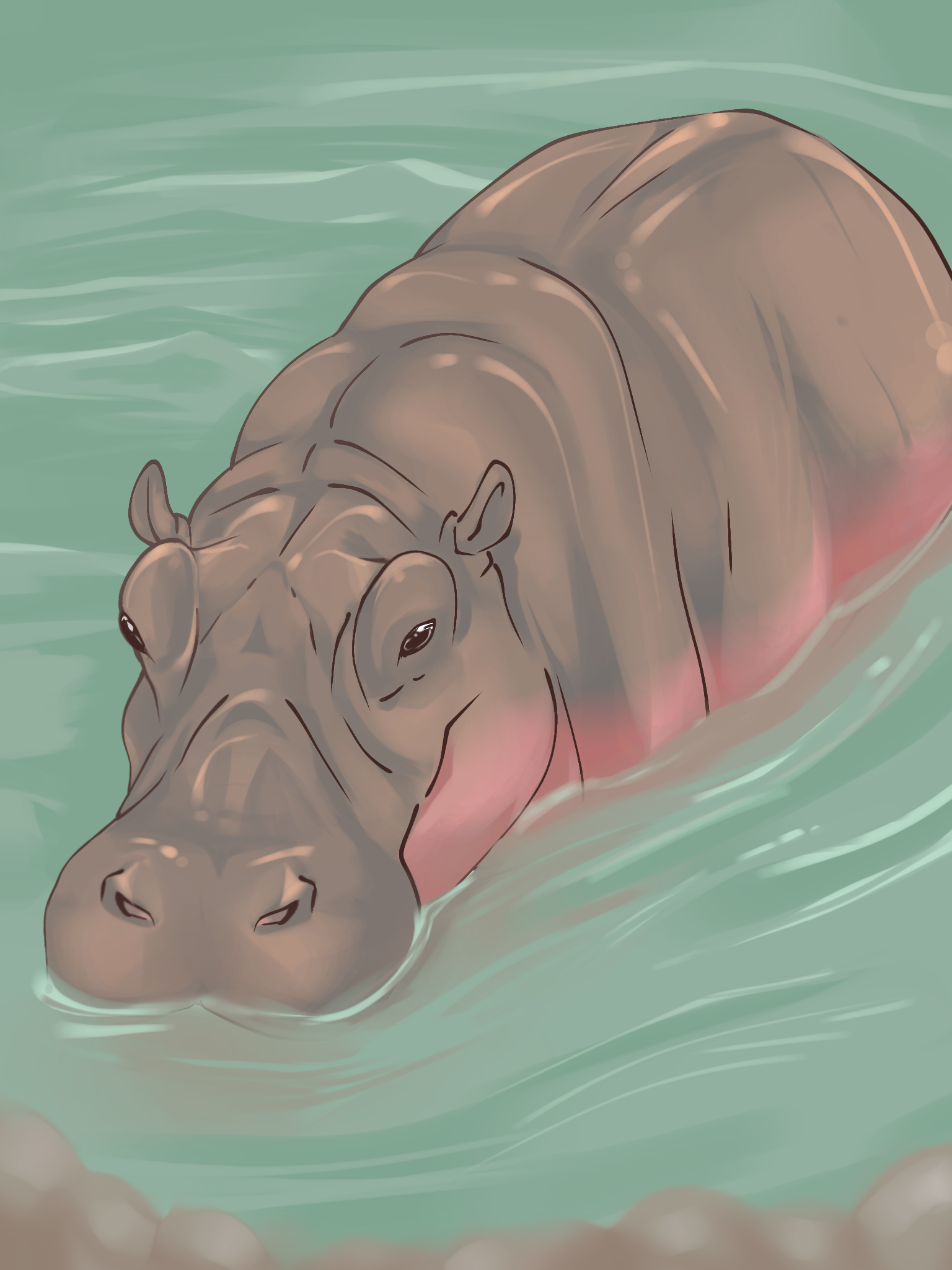

Scientific classification
- Kingdom: Animalia
- Phylum: Chordata
- Class: Mammalia
- Order: Artiodactyla
- Family: Hippopotamidae
- Genus: Hippopotamus
- Species: †H. behemoth

Binomial name
- †Hippopotamus behemoth Faure 1986

= Hippopotamus behemoth =

Hippopotamus behemoth Temporal range: Early Pleistocene

Extinct species of hippopotamus

Hippopotamus behemoth is an extinct species of hippopotamus from the Early Pleistocene of the Levant. Fossils of it, and its probable ancestor, H. gorgops, are found in the 'Ubeidiya site in the southern Israel, dating to the Early Pleistocene, around 1.4 million years ago.

H. behemoth differs from H. gorgops in having more elongated feet, and being somewhat smaller. Some experts consider these differences to be too slight to justify separating the two species, however, while other authors have considered the species to be closer in morphology to the European species Hippopotamus antiquus.
