= Palaeoloxodon jolensis =

Palaeoloxodon jolensis Temporal range: late Middle Pleistocene-Late Pleistocene

Scientific classification
- Domain: Eukaryota
- Kingdom: Animalia
- Phylum: Chordata
- Class: Mammalia
- Order: Proboscidea
- Family: Elephantidae
- Genus: †Palaeoloxodon
- Species: †P. jolensis

Binomial name
- †Palaeoloxodon jolensis (Pomel, 1895)

Synonyms
- Elephas iolensis

Extinct species of elephant

Palaeoloxodon jolensis (often historically erroneously spelled iolensis) is an extinct species of elephant. The type specimen is located in the National Museum of Natural History in Paris. It is either considered the descendant species or last evolutionary stage of Palaeoloxodon recki in Africa. It is only known from isolated molars. The species is known from remains found across Africa (including Algeria, Morocco, Tunisia, South Africa, and Kenya), which are largely poorly dated to approximately the late Middle Pleistocene to Late Pleistocene, with some authors suggesting an exclusively late Middle Pleistocene age, as the only well dated specimens of the species in East Africa are over 130,000 years old. Like P. recki, they are thought to have been dedicated grazers, being distinguished from earlier P. recki by having increased hypsodonty (tooth crown height) and enamel folding, with the plates being thicker along the long axis of the tooth, though the species may have consumed a degree of browse based on isotopic evidence. The extinction of the P. recki/jolensis lineage in Africa has either been attributed to the increasing aridification of Africa across the Middle Pleistocene, or the growing sophistication of human hunters. Following the extinction of P. jolensis they were replaced by the modern, generalist African bush elephant (Loxodonta africana).

The species was often historically spelled iolensis, however, the original intended spelling appears to be jolensis. While originally placed in Elephas, it is now placed in Palaeoloxodon. Some authors continue to use the genus Elephas.
