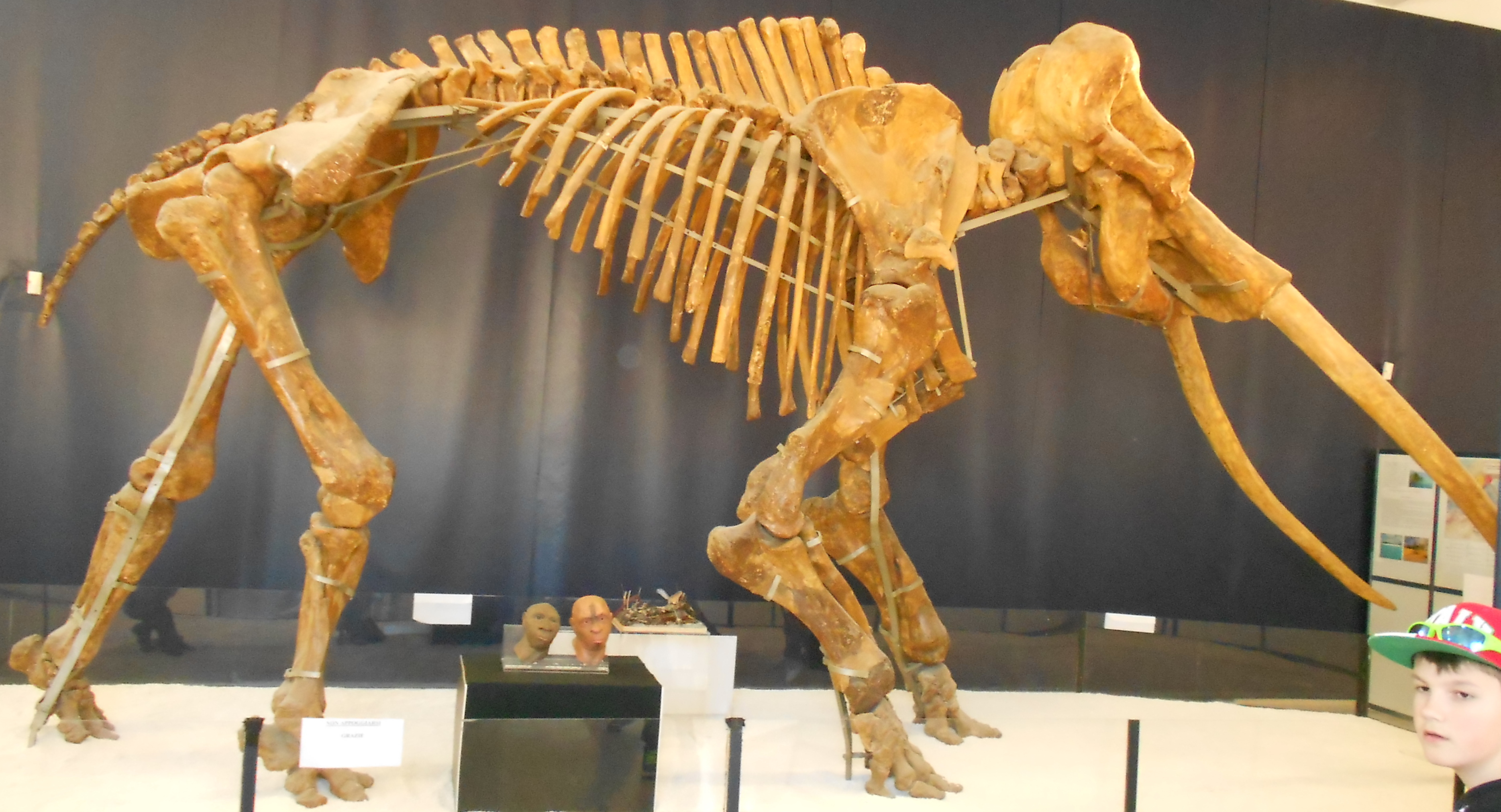
- Skeleton of the straight-tusked elephant (Palaeoloxodon antiquus) at the paleontological museum of the Sapienza University of Rome

Scientific classification
- Kingdom: Animalia
- Phylum: Chordata
- Class: Mammalia
- Order: Proboscidea
- Clade: Elephantida
- Superfamily: Elephantoidea
- Family: Elephantidae
- Genus: †Palaeoloxodon; Matsumoto, 1924

Type species
- Elephas namadicus naumanni Makiyama, 1924

Species
- See text

Synonyms
- Sivalikia Osborn, 1924; Pilgrimia Osborn, 1924; Hesperoloxodon Osborn, 1931

= Palaeoloxodon =

Palaeoloxodon Temporal range: Early Pleistocene–Holocene

Genus of extinct elephants

Palaeoloxodon is an extinct genus of elephant. It originated in Africa during the Early Pleistocene, and expanded into Eurasia at the beginning of the Middle Pleistocene. Palaeoloxodon contains the largest known species of elephants, with mature bulls over 4 metres (13 ft) tall at the shoulders and over 13 tonnes (29,000 lb) in weight, representing among the largest land mammals ever, including the African Palaeoloxodon recki, the European straight-tusked elephant (Palaeoloxodon antiquus) and the South Asian Palaeoloxodon namadicus. P. namadicus has been suggested to be the largest known land mammal by some authors based on extrapolation from fragmentary remains, though these estimates are highly speculative. In contrast, the genus also contains many species of dwarf elephants (an example of insular dwarfism) on islands in the Mediterranean, some like Palaeoloxodon falconeri less than 1 m (3 ft 3 in) in shoulder height as fully grown adults, making them the smallest elephants known. The genus has a long and complex taxonomic history, and at various times, it has been considered to belong to Loxodonta or Elephas, but today is usually considered a valid and separate genus in its own right.

== History of research and taxonomy ==
Remains of Palaeoloxodon species have probably been noted since ancient times where their remains like those of other fossil proboscideans were interpreted as those of giants or other mythical beings. In 1695, remains of a straight-tusked elephant were collected from travertine deposits near Burgtonna in what is now Thuringia, Germany. While these remains were originally declared by the Collegium Medicum in the nearby city of Gotha to be purely mineral in nature, Wilhelm Ernst Tentzel, a polymath in the employ of the ducal court of Saxe-Gotha-Altenburg, correctly recognised that they represented the remains of an elephant. Prior to 1845, the remains of Eurasian species of Palaeoloxodon were considered to be those of woolly mammoths. The earliest species of Palaeoloxodon to be described, the European straight-tusked elephant (Palaeoloxodon antiquus) and the South Asian Palaeoloxodon namadicus, were named by British paleontologists Hugh Falconer and Proby Cautley in 1846-47. Prior to the description of the genus, Palaeoloxodon species were initially placed in the genus Elephas (which includes the Asian elephant).

In 1924, Matsumoto Hikoshichirō coined Palaeoloxodon, and circumscribed it as a subgenus of Loxodonta (which include the living species of African elephants). It included the "E. antiquus—namadicus group", and he designated the Japanese "E. namadicus naumanni Mak." as its type species. Also in 1924, American paleontologist Henry Fairfield Osborn named the genera Sivalika and Pilgrimia, with the former covering the Asian species and the latter covering the African and Mediterranean island dwarf species of Palaeoloxodon. In 1931 Osborn named the genus Hesperoloxodon to include Palaeoloxodon antiquus. In a 1942 posthumous publication, Osborn recognised Sivalika and Pilgrimia as junior synonyms of Palaeoloxodon, while still recognising Hesperoloxodon as valid. This publication was the first to consider Palaeoloxodon a valid genus in its own right, an opinion followed by later authors such as Emiliano Aguirre in 1969. Later authors have considered Hesperoloxodon another synonym of Palaeoloxodon. Vincent J. Maglio in a 1973 publication controversially synonymised Palaeoloxodon with Elephas based on morphological similarities between the two genera. Later authors either considered Palaeoloxodon a valid genus or a subgenus of Elephas. Cladistic analyses finding Elephas and Palaeoloxodon to not be each other's closest relatives led to the placement of Palaeoloxodon species within Elephas to be questioned by other authors. By the 2010s Palaeoloxodon was widely regarded as a valid genus separate from Elephas.

Phylogeny showing the placement of the straight-tusked elephant (Palaeoloxodon antiquus) in relation to other elephantids based on nuclear genomes, showing hybrid ancestry from African forest elephants and mammoths. This ancestry is likely common to all Eurasian Palaeoloxodon, with the African forest elephant hybridisation suggested to have occurred around 1 million years ago in Palaeoloxodon recki.

During the 19th and 20th centuries, species of Palaeoloxodon were subject to numerous phylogenetic hypotheses regarding their relationship to other elephantids. Some scholars like Hans Pohlig in 1891 and Osborn in 1935 considered the species of Palaeoloxodon to be closely related to African elephants, while others like Wolfgang Soergel in 1915 considered them to be closely related to mammoths. From the late 20th century to the first decade of the 21st century, Palaeoloxodon was usually considered to be closely related the Asian elephant and other members of the genus Elephas.

In 2016, a study of the straight-tusked elephant (P. antiquus) mitochondrial genome and part of the nuclear genome found that the mitochondrial sequences were nested within the diversity of those of the African forest elephant, Loxodonta cyclotis, with the partial nuclear genome supporting P. antiquus as more closely related to L. cyclotis than the African bush elephant, L. africana. A later study published in 2018 by the same authors based on the complete nuclear genome revised these results, and suggested P. antiquus resulted from reticulate evolution and had a complex ancestry tree, with the majority (~60%) of its nuclear genome coming from a lineage more closely related to modern African elephants than to Asian elephants and mammoths, but which diverged before the split between the two living species, with significant introgressed ancestry resulting from hybridization with African forest elephants (~36% of total genome) and to a lesser extent mammoths (~6%). The ancestry from L. cyclotis was more closely related to modern West African populations of the forest elephant than to other forest elephant populations, while the mammoth ancestry came from a lineage that diverged prior to the split between woolly and Columbian mammoths, probably from shortly after the split between the ancestors of mammoths and Asian elephants. Mitochondrial genomes obtained from Chinese and Japanese Palaeoloxodon specimens indicate that the forest elephant ancestry was ubiquitous among Eurasian Palaeoloxodon populations. Both hybridization events probably took place in Africa, where Palaeoloxodon was dominant for most of the Early Pleistocene, with the mammoth hybridisation suggested to have taken place earlier than the hybridisation with forest elephants.

Analysis of mitochondrial genomes, including Palaeoloxodon individuals from Northern China and Japanese Palaeoloxodon naumanni indicate that African forest elephant mitochondrial genomes completely replaced those originally present in Palaeoloxodon, and that Palaeoloxodon harboured multiple separate mitochondrial genome lineages derived from African forest elephants, some being more closely related to some West African forest elephant groups than to others. It is unclear as to whether this is the result of multiple hybridisation events, or whether multiple mitochondrial lineages were introgressed in a single event. The hybridisation with forest elephants is likely to have occurred around 1 million years ago in Palaeoloxodon recki. It has been found that mitochondrial genome of Chinese Palaeoloxodon specimens clustered with a P. antiquus individual from western Europe, which belonged to a separate clade than other sampled European P. antiquus specimens. The relatively low divergence between the mitochondrial genomes of the European P. antiquus individual and the Chinese Palaeoloxodon specimens may indicate that the populations of Palaeoloxodon across Eurasia maintained gene flow with each other, but this is uncertain.

=== List of species ===
- P. recki (Synonym: Elephas recki) (East Africa), the oldest species and ancestor of all later species
- P. jolensis (Synonym: Elephas iolensis) the last (late Middle-Late Pleistocene) representative of Palaeoloxodon in Africa
- P. antiquus (Synonym: Elephas antiquus) (Straight tusked elephant) (Europe, Western Asia)
- P. huaihoensis (China)
- P. namadicus (Synonym: Elephas namadicus) (Indian subcontinent, possibly also elsewhere in Asia), the largest in its genus, and possibly the largest terrestrial mammal ever
- P. naumanni (Synonym: E. namadicus naumanni) (Naumann's elephant) (Japan, possibly also China and Korea)
- P. turkmenicus known from a specimen found in the Middle Pleistocene of Turkmenistan in Central Asia, as well as a specimen from the Kashmir Valley in the northwest Indian subcontinent.

==== Mediterranean island dwarfs ====
These Mediterranean insular dwarf elephant species are almost certainly descended from P. antiquus.

- P. creutzburgi (Crete)
- P. xylophagou (Cyprus)
- P. cypriotes (Cyprus)
- P. lomolinoi (Naxos)
- P. tiliensis (Tilos)
- P. mnaidriensis (Sicily and Malta)
- P. falconeri (Sicily and Malta)

Other indeterminate dwarf Palaeoloxodon species are known from other Greek islands, including Rhodes and Kasos.

== Description ==
Many species of Palaeoloxodon are noted for the distinctive parieto-occipital crest (POC), a bone growth at the top of the skull above the nasal opening which projects forwards and overhangs the rest of the skull. The crest probably functioned to anchor muscle tissue, including the splenius as well as an additional muscle layer called the "extra splenius" (which was likely similar to the "splenius superficialis" found in Asian elephants, and which may have been an extension of the rhomboideus cervicis muscle) which wrapped around the top of the head to support it. How pronouncedly developed the crest is varies, depending on growth stage and gender, with females and juveniles having less developed or absent crests. The crest likely developed as a response to the large size of the head, which in proportional and absolute terms are the largest in size of any proboscideans. The crest shows differences in development depending on species, with the earliest species P. recki as well as the Japanese P. naumanni and Central Asian P. turkmenicus only having weakly developed crests (the so-called "Stuttgart morph"), while P. antiquus, P. namadicus and Chinese Palaeoloxodon have strongly developed crests (the so-called "namadicus morph"). It is thought that the weakly developed morphology of the POC is the ancestral condition in Palaeoloxodon, with the strongly developed "namadicus morph" having evolved following the migration of Palaeoloxodon into Eurasia.

The skull is proportionally short and tall, with the premaxillary bones containing the tusks being flared outwards. The tusks have relatively little curvature, and are proportionally large, and somewhat twisted, with the tusk alveoli (sockets) being divergent from each other at least in Pleistocene species. These tusks could reach 4 metres (13 ft) in length, and probably over 190 kilograms (420 lb) in weight in the largest species, larger than any recorded in modern elephants.

The lamellae (pockets of dentin surrounded by a layer of enamel, forming a ridge-like structure) of molar teeth of Palaeoloxodon species typically show a "dot-dash-dot" wear pattern when they are found early in their wear life cycle, with the enamel folds concentrated into a major central structure at the midline of the tooth, which are flanked by smaller folds on either side, and the crowns of the tooth are generally proportionally narrow. The teeth are typically very hypsodont (high crowned) with a substantial number of lamellae (up to 19 to 21 on the third molar), though the lamellae frequency is distinctly lower than that reached by advanced mammoth species. The morphology of the teeth varies little between non-dwarf Eurasian Palaeoloxodon species, meaning that they generally cannot be distinguished based on tooth morphology alone.

Species of Palaeoloxodon varied widely in size. Fully grown bulls of Palaeoloxodon recki, Palaeoloxodon antiquus, Palaeoloxodon namadicus and Chinese Palaeoloxodon grew substantially larger than living elephants, with some mature bulls exceeding 4 metres (13 ft) tall at the shoulder and 13 tonnes (29,000 lb) in body mass, making them some of the largest known terrestrial mammals to have ever lived. In a 2015 study, one fragmentary unlocated femur of P. namadicus described in the 19th century was estimated to have belonged to an individual 5.2 m (17 ft 1 in) tall and 22 tonnes (49,000 lb) in weight, exceeding the estimates for the otherwise largest known land mammals, the paraceratheres. However, this estimate is highly speculative and the author suggested that it should be "taken with a grain of salt". In contrast, some of the island dwarf species are the smallest elephants known. The smallest species, P. cypriotes and P. falconeri, only reached 1 metre (3.3 ft) tall as fully grown adults, with fully grown adult bulls of P. falconeri having an estimated body mass of only 250 kg (550 lb).

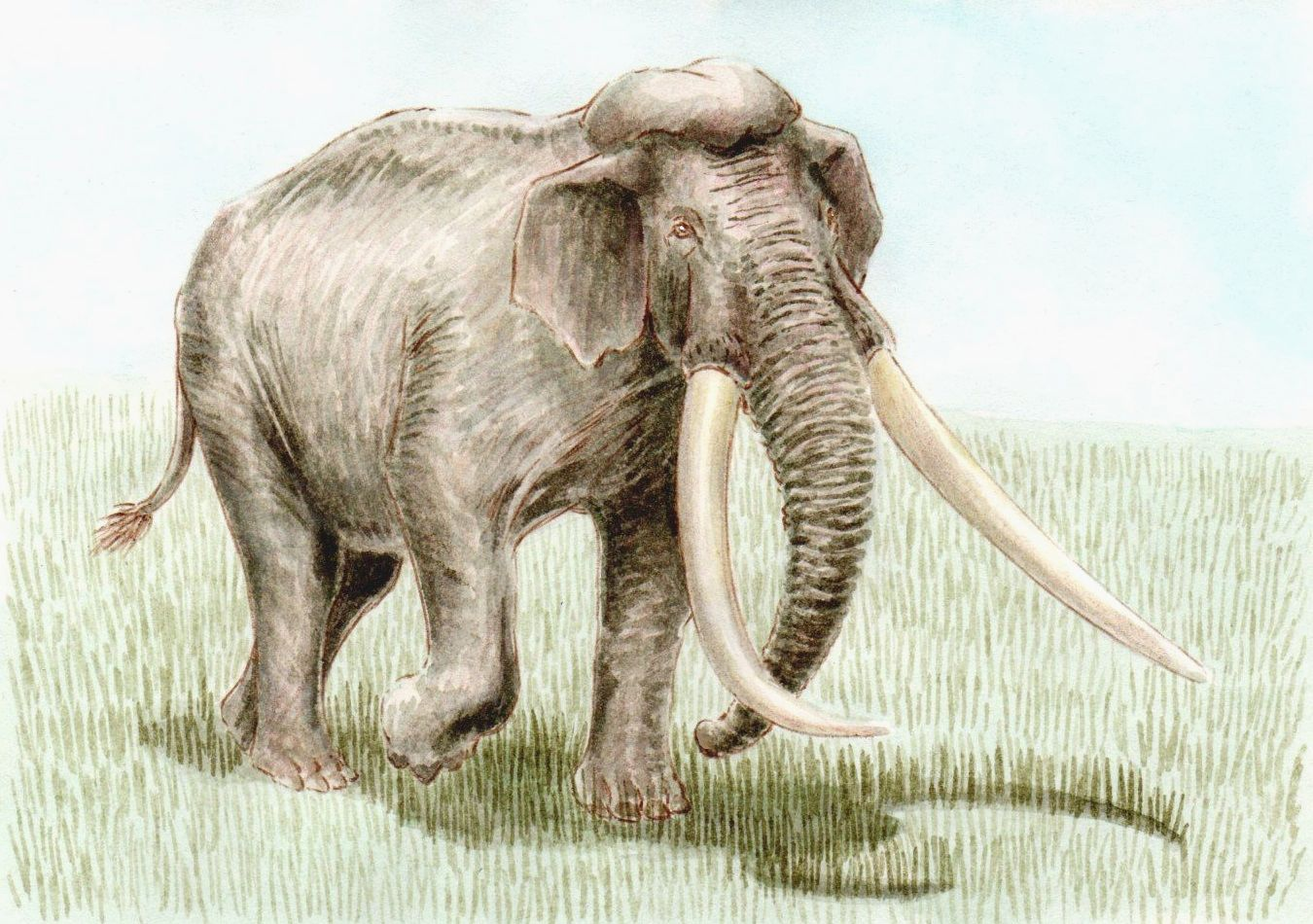
Life restoration of Palaeoloxodon namadicus

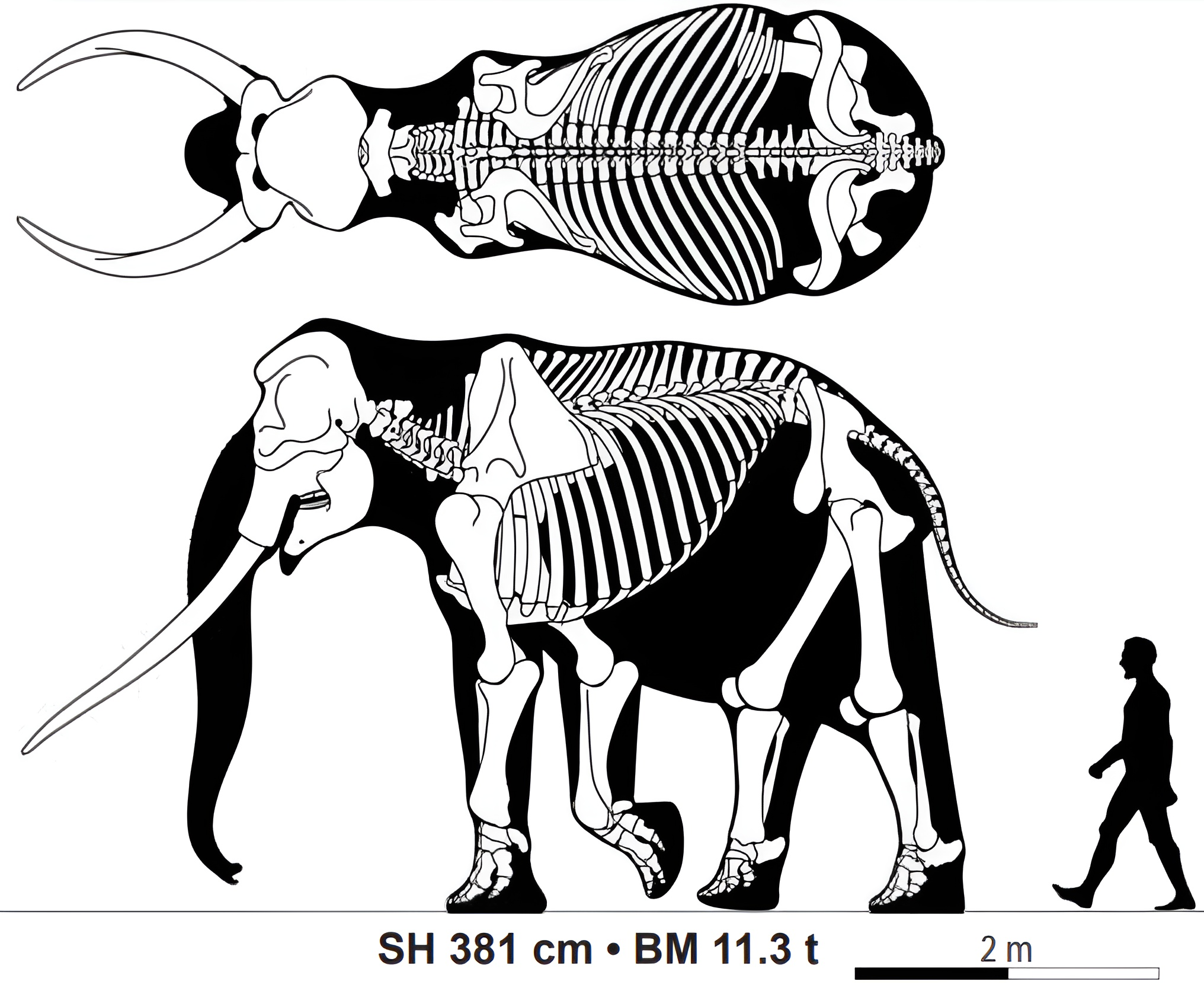
Skeletal diagram of an adult male straight-tusked elephant (Palaeoloxodon antiquus)

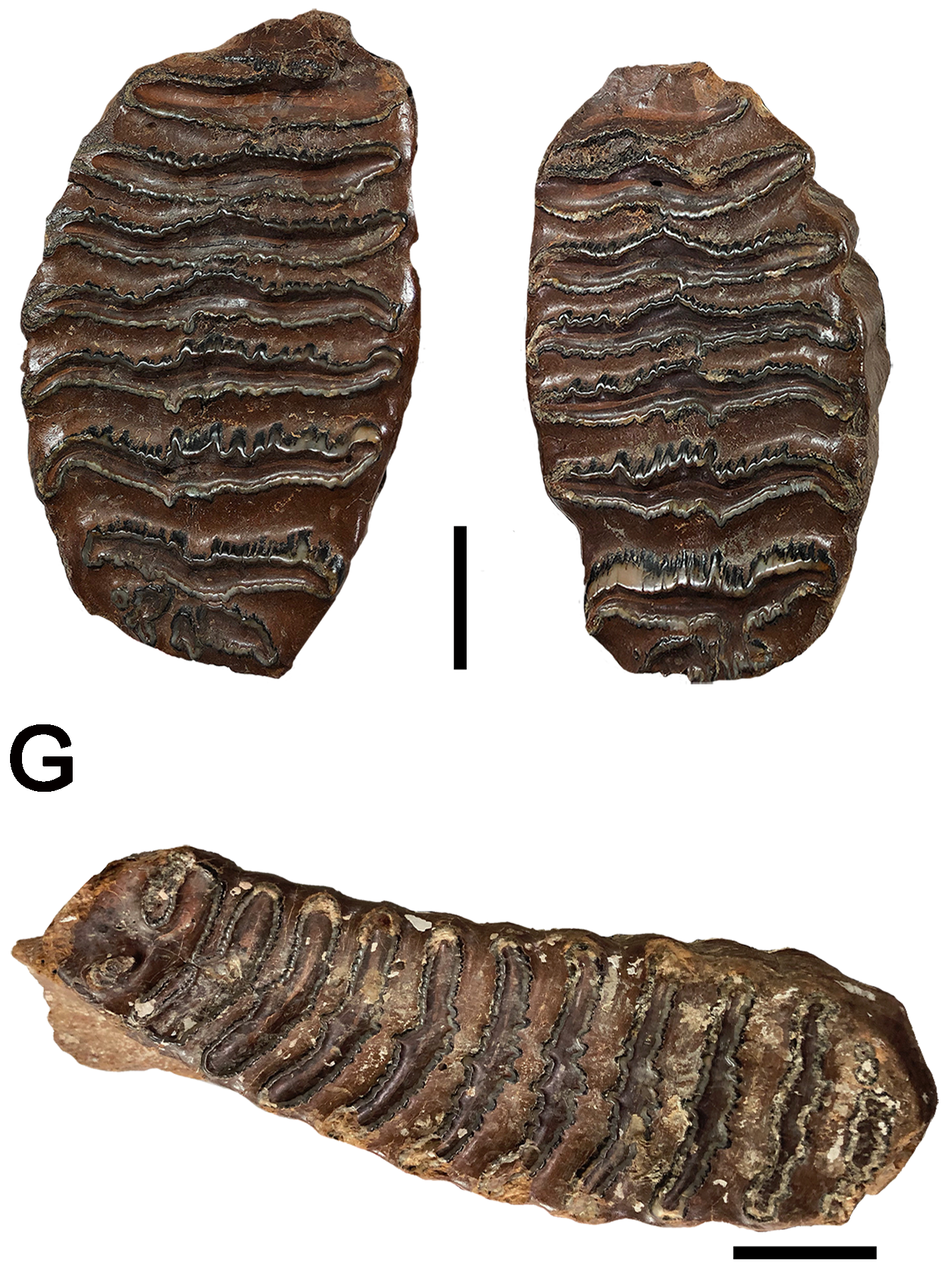
Third molar teeth of Palaeoloxodon huaihoensis

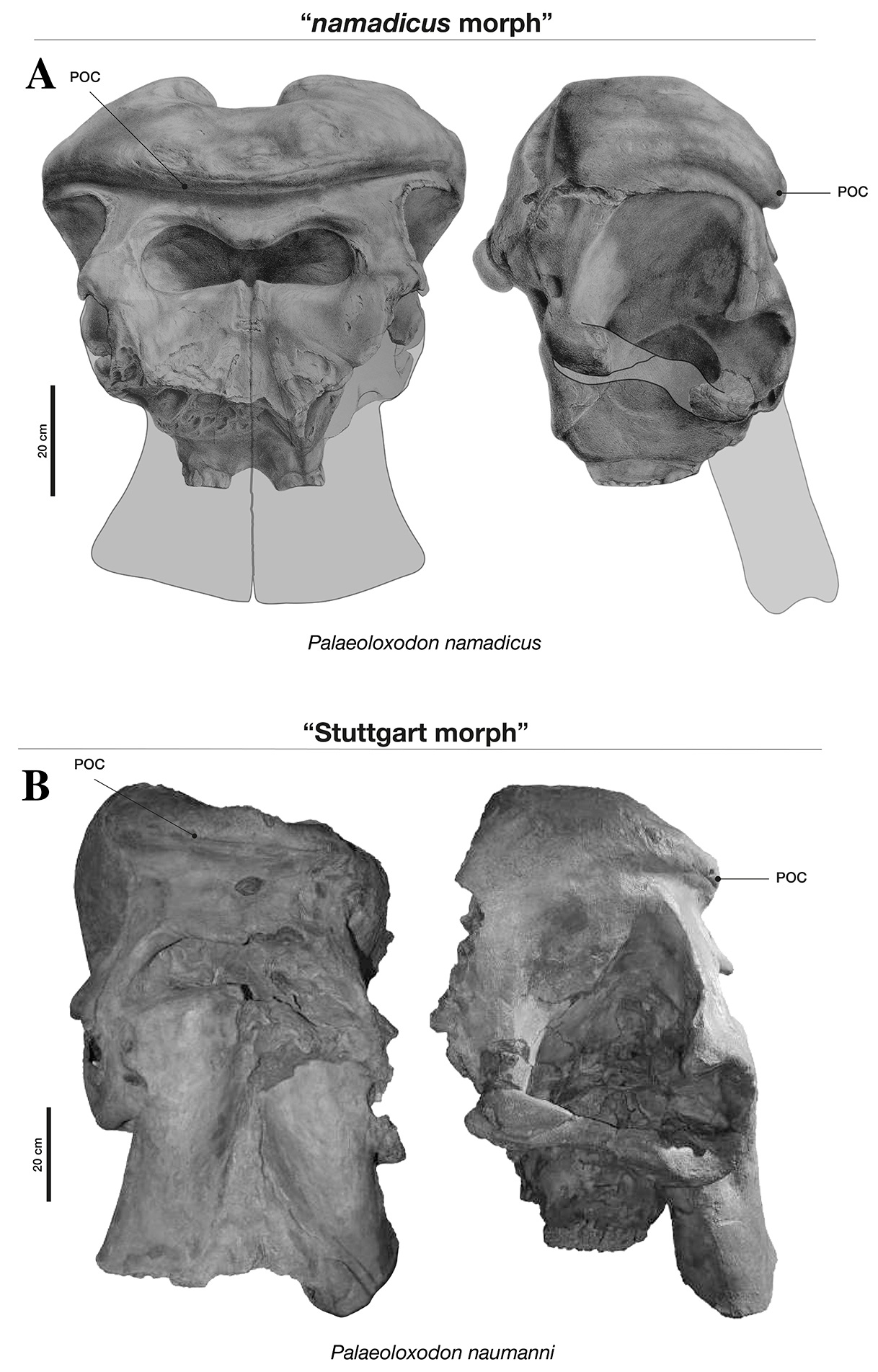
Skull of Palaeoloxodon namadicus (top) and Palaeoloxodon naumanni (below), showing differences in the development of the parietal-occipital crest (labeled POC)

Size comparison of the dwarf elephant Palaeoloxodon falconeri, one of the smallest elephants known

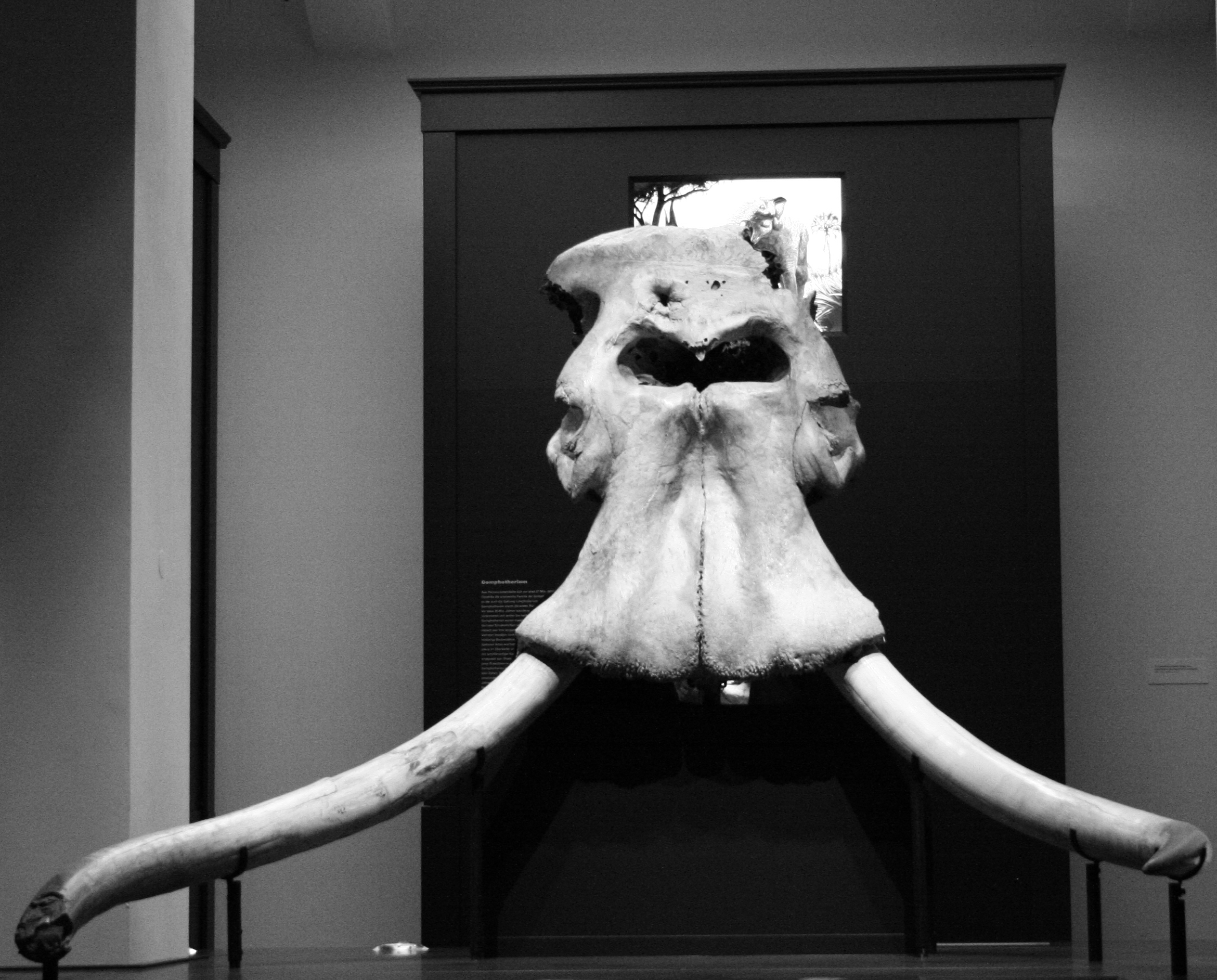
Skull of Palaeoloxodon antiquus in front-on view, showing flared premaxillae with divergent tusks

== Ecology ==
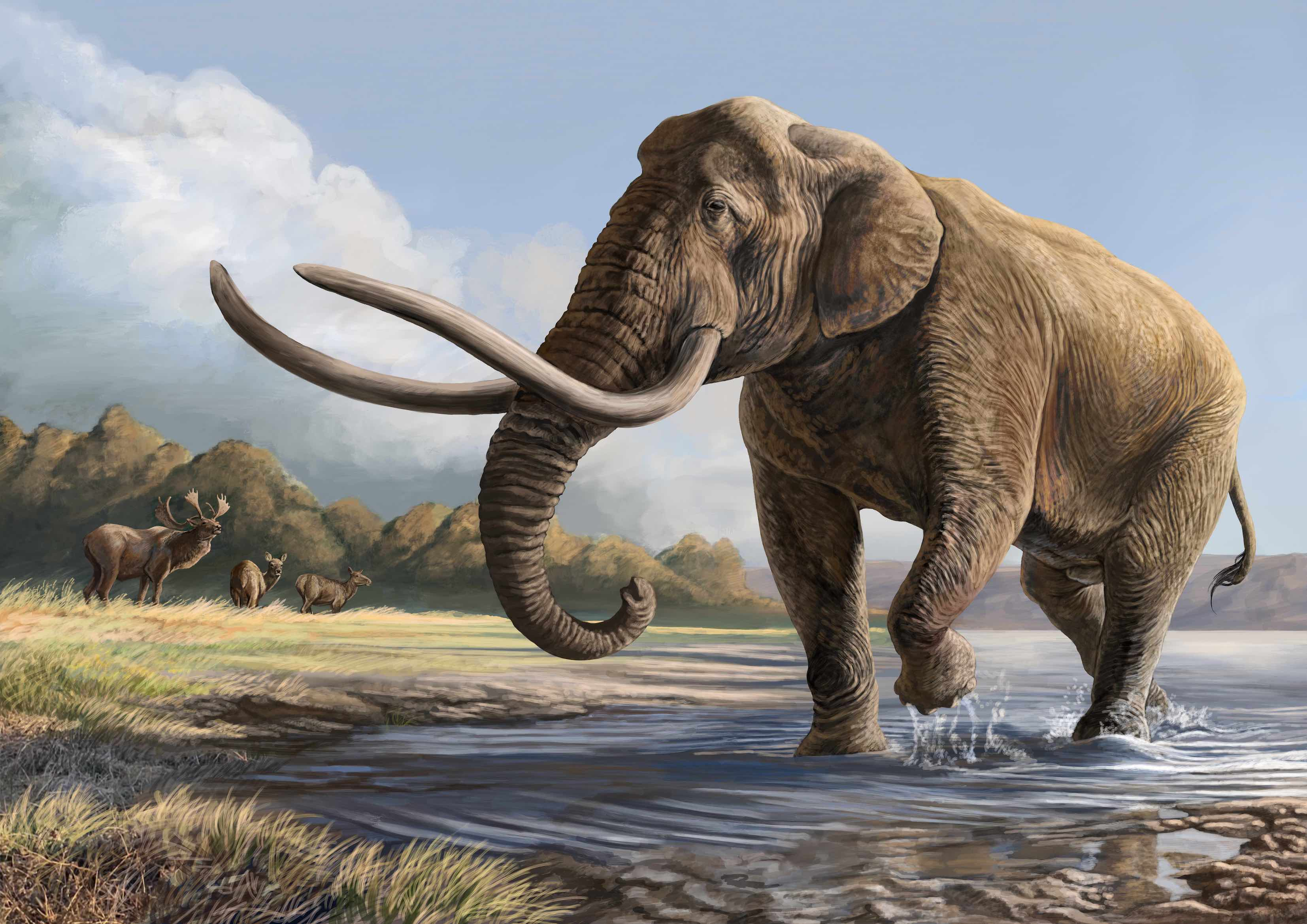
Life restoration of Palaeoloxodon naumanni in a Pleistocene Japanese landscape

Species of Palaeoloxodon are thought to have had similar social behaviour to modern elephants, with herds of adult females and juveniles, as well as solitary adult males. The African species of Palaeoloxodon, as well as P. namadicus are suggested to have been grazers, while P. antiquus is suggested to have been a variable mixed feeder that consumed a considerable amount of browse.

== Evolution ==
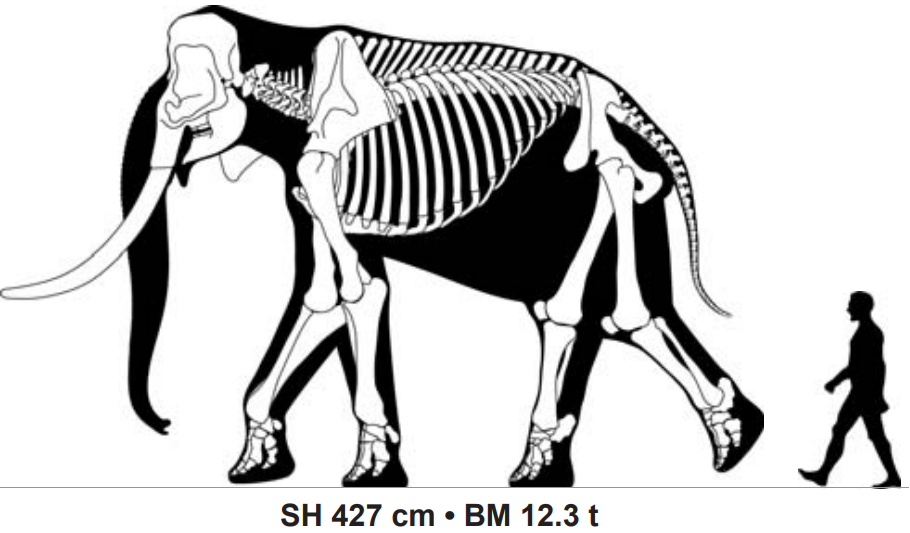
Skeleton of an adult male Palaeoloxodon recki, the earliest species of Palaeoloxodon

Palaeoloxodon first unambiguously appears in the fossil record in Africa during the Early Pleistocene, around 1.8 million years ago as the species Palaeoloxodon recki ileretensis (it is contested whether earlier "E. recki" subspecies are related to Palaeoloxodon). P. recki was the dominant elephant in East Africa for most of the Pleistocene. The hybridization between African forest elephants and Palaeoloxodon recki in Africa is suggested to have occurred around 1 million years ago. A population of P. recki migrated out of Africa at the beginning of the Middle Pleistocene around 800,000 years ago, diversifying into the radiation of Eurasian Palaeoloxodon species, including P. antiquus, and P. namadicus. The precise relationships of the Eurasian taxa to each other are obscure. The arrival of P. antiquus in Europe co-incides with the extinction of the temperate adapted mammoth species Mammuthus meridionalis (sometimes called the southern mammoth) and its replacement by Mammuthus trogontherii (the steppe mammoth) in Europe, with the extinction of M. meridionalis possibly in part a result of competition with P. antiquus. P. antiquus was able to disperse onto many islands in the Mediterranean, undergoing insular dwarfism and speciating into numerous distinct varieties of dwarf elephants. Palaeoloxodon fossils are abundant in China and are assigned to three species, P. namadicus, P. naumanni and P. huaihoensis. However, the relationships of Chinese Palaeoloxodon are currently unresolved and it is unclear how many species were present in the region.

== Relationship with humans ==
Evidence of interaction with Palaeoloxodon by archaic humans extends back over 1 million years ago in Africa, possibly as early as 1.8 million years ago, with a number sites with Palaeoloxodon recki in Africa showing evidence of butchery. There is extensive evidence for butchery and to a lesser extent hunting of the European straight-tusked elephant by archaic humans like Homo heidelbergensis and Neanderthals. Evidence has been found for butchery of Palaeoloxodon turkmenicus by archaic humans in the Indian subcontinent. Based on the association of their remains with stone artefacts, it has been suggested modern humans encountered and butchered the Japanese P. naumanni and the Cyprus dwarf elephant P. cypriotes during the Last Glacial Period.

== Extinction ==
The timing of the extinction of the last Paleoloxodon species in Africa, P. jolensis, is uncertain. While often suggested to have gone extinct during the Late Pleistocene, most specimens of the species are poorly dated and dating of specimens from Kenya suggests that it went extinct there around 130,000 years ago, at the end of the Middle Pleistocene. Most Eurasian species of Palaeoloxodon became extinct towards the end of the Last Glacial Period as part of the Late Pleistocene extinction event of most large terrestrial mammals globally, probably as a result of climate change, human activity, or a combination of both. The youngest confirmed records of P. antiquus are from the Iberian Peninsula, dating to around 44-43,000 years ago, with footprints from the southern part of the peninsula possibly extending the record to 28,000 years ago. The youngest Japanese records of P. naumanni date to around 24,000 years ago or 36,000 years ago. The timing of extinction of Chinese Palaeoloxodon and Indian P. namadicus is uncertain, but claims of a Holocene survival are not substantiated for either region. The youngest dates for the Sicilian dwarf elephant P. cf. mnaidriensis are around 32-20,000 years ago, while those of Cyprus dwarf elephant P. cypriotes are around 12,000 years ago, shortly after humans arrived to the island. The dwarf elephant P. tiliensis from the Greek island of Tilos is suggested by some authors to have survived as recently as 3,500 years Before Present (around 1500 BC) based on preliminary radiocarbon dating done in the 1970s, which would make it the youngest surviving elephant in Europe, but this has not been thoroughly investigated.
