= Penghu Channel =

Strait in Taiwan

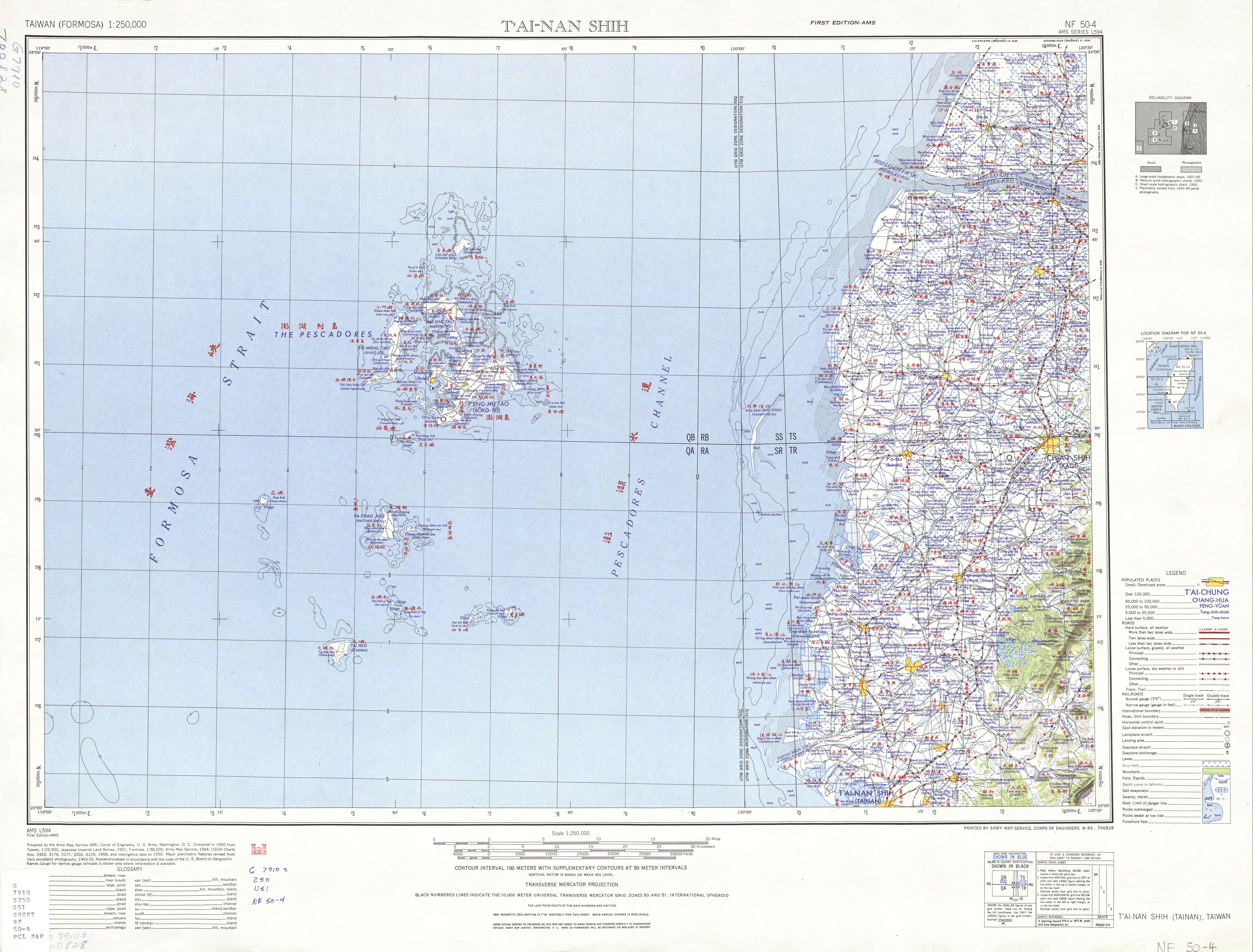
Map showing the Pescadores Channel (澎湖水道) (AMS, 1950)

The Penghu Channel (Chinese: 澎湖水道; pinyin: Pēnghú Hángdào) or Pescadores Channel is the body of water that separates the Penghu islands from the main island of Taiwan and links the Taiwan Strait to the northeastern South China Sea. The channel has been considered narrow and potentially difficult to navigate in monsoon season. The channel is known for Pleistocene aged fossils dredged up from bottom sediments, including the archaic human mandible Penghu 1 as well as the extinct elephant Palaeoloxodon huaihoensis.
