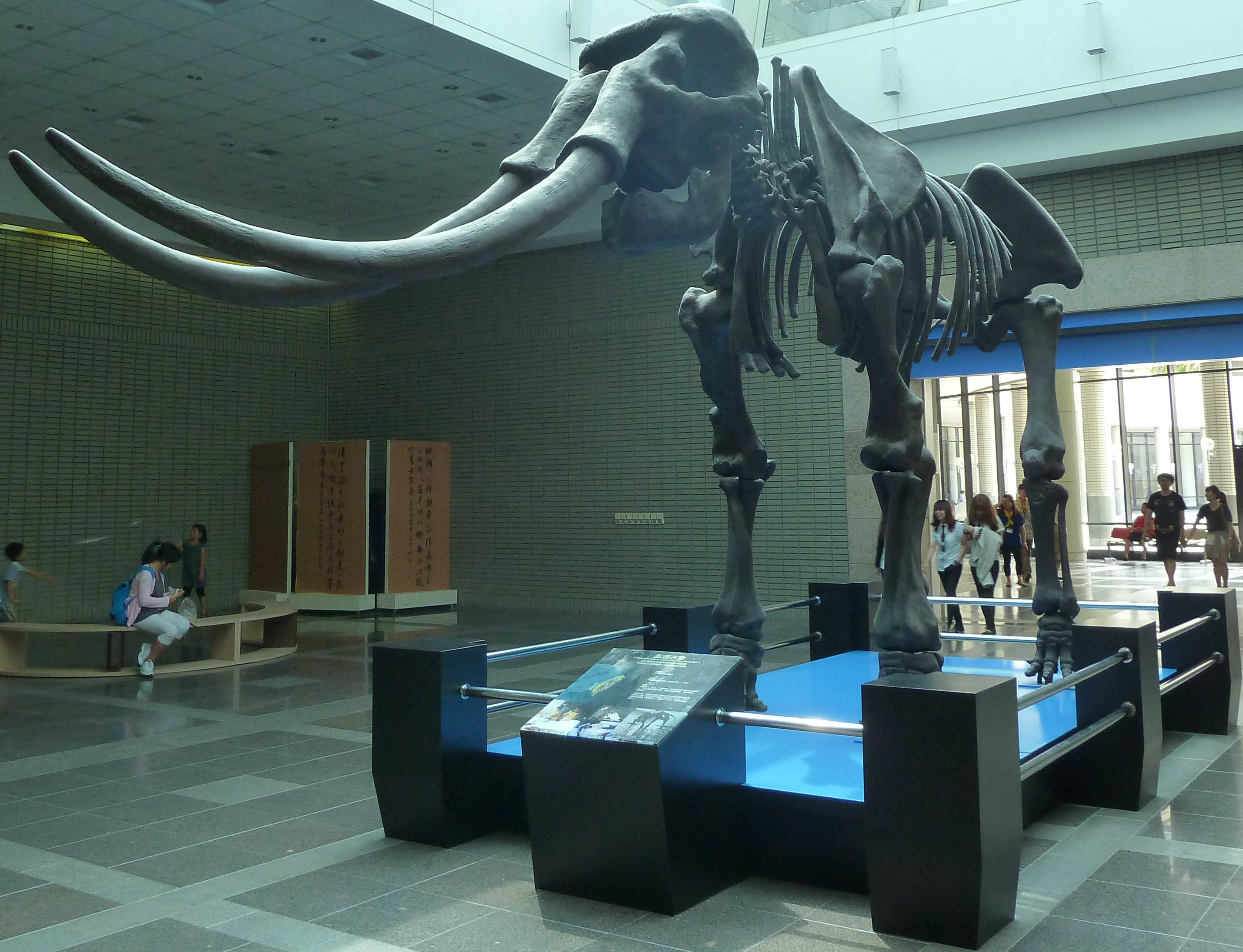
- Skeleton of Palaeoloxodon huaihoensis at National Museum of Natural Science, Taiwan

Scientific classification
- Kingdom: Animalia
- Phylum: Chordata
- Class: Mammalia
- Infraclass: Placentalia
- Order: Proboscidea
- Family: Elephantidae
- Genus: †Palaeoloxodon
- Species: †P. huaihoensis

Binomial name
- †Palaeoloxodon huaihoensis Liu, 1977

= Palaeoloxodon huaihoensis =

Palaeoloxodon huaihoensis Temporal range: Pleistocene

Extinct species of elephant native to China

Palaeoloxodon huaihoensis is an extinct species of elephant belonging to the genus Palaeoloxodon known from the Pleistocene of China.

== Taxonomy ==
It was first named a subspecies of P. naumanni (which is principally known from material found in Japan) by J. Liu in 1977 based on a partial skeleton from Huaiyuan, Anhui, and was later elevated to species rank by G. Qi in 1999, who also included other Chinese Palaeoloxodon remains within species, including the abundant remains found in the Penghu Channel between the Penghu archipelago and Taiwan. Material from the Penghu Channel sample predominantly represents adult individuals. A mostly complete adult skull (IVPP V4443) from Late Pleistocene Nihewan basin in Hebei may be referrable to this species. A 2006 paper suggested that the species "Archidiskodon" weifangensis named by C. Z. Jin in 1983 from a skeleton found in Shandong province, actually represented Palaeoloxodon.

== Description ==
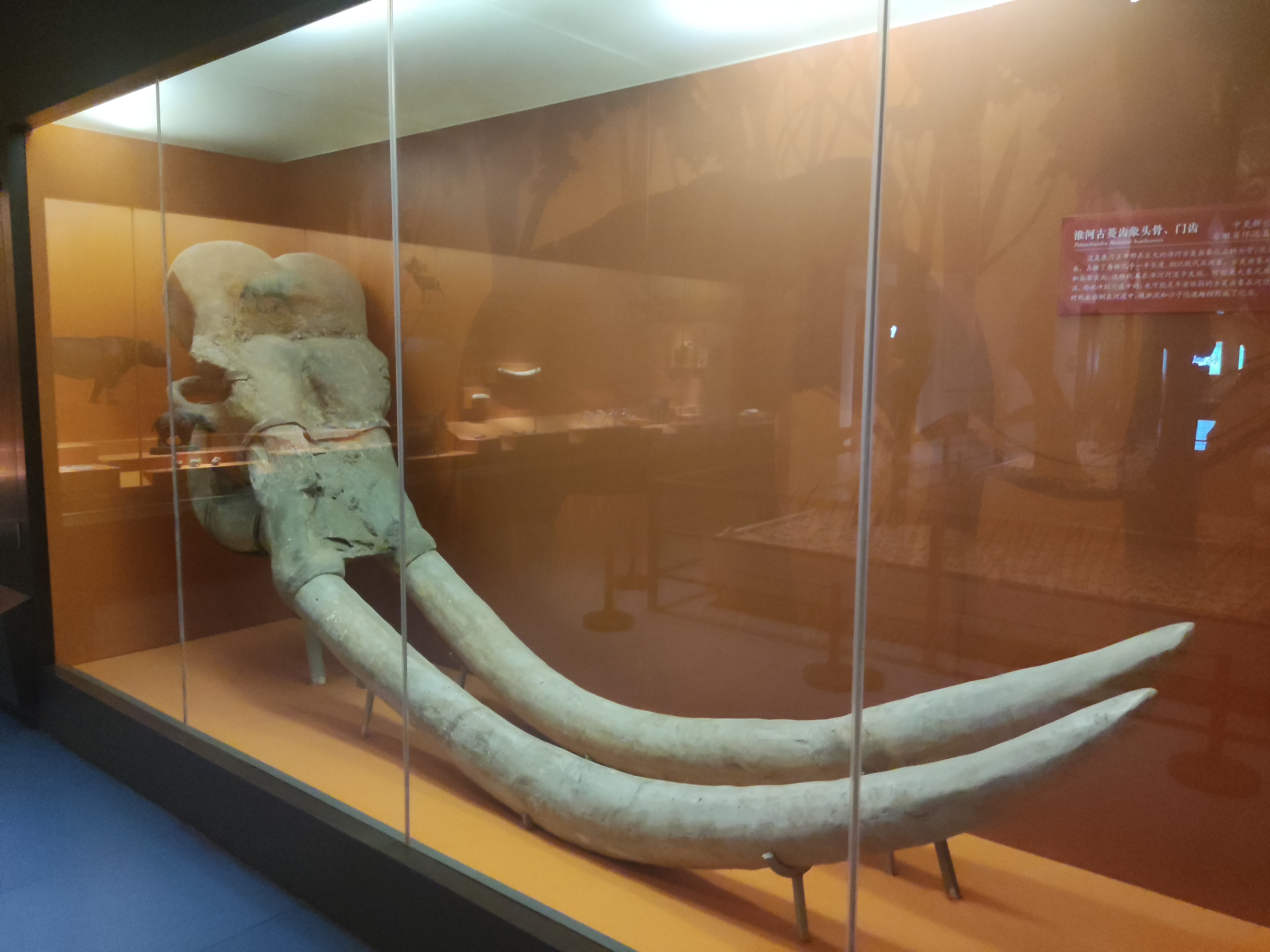
Skull

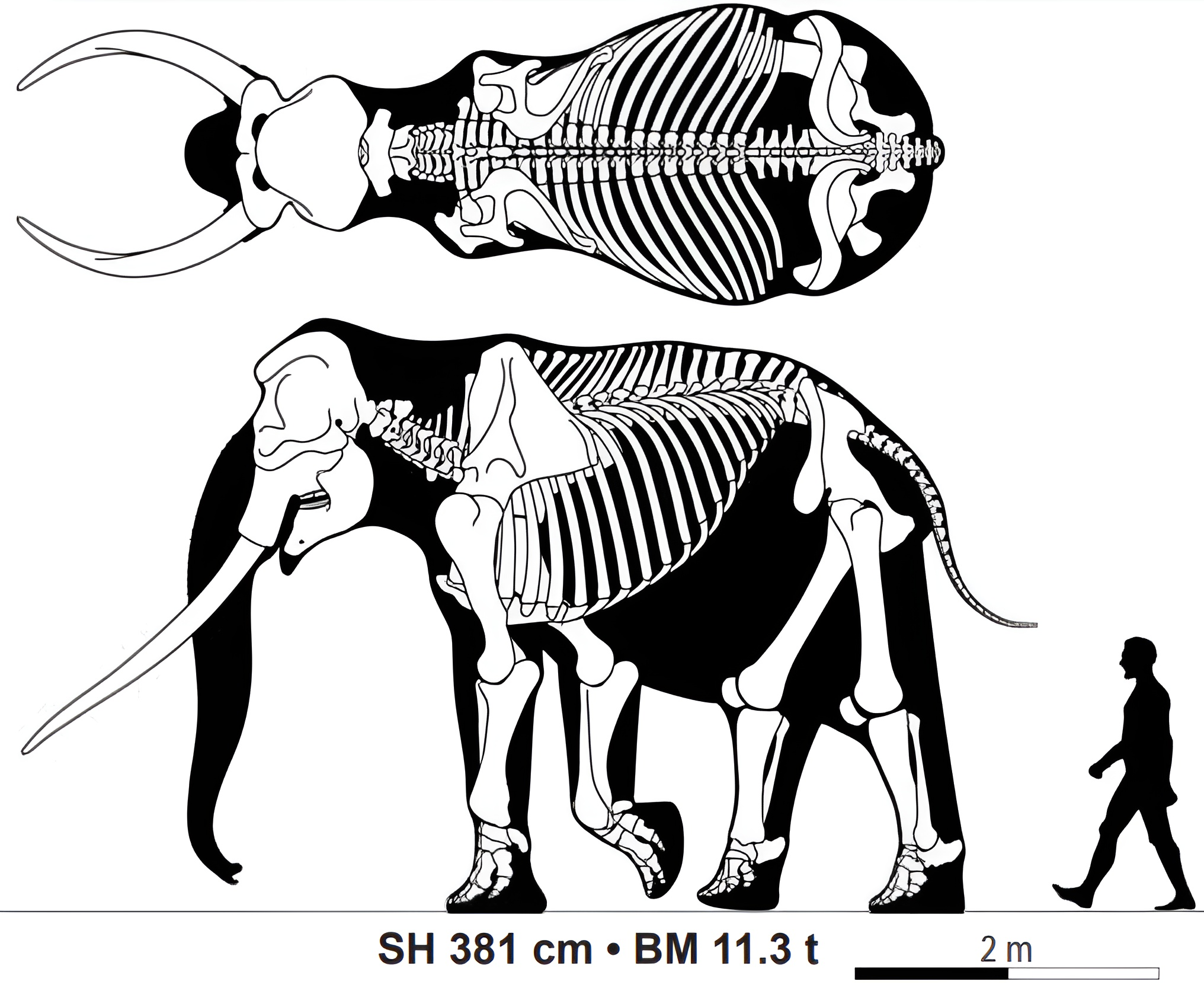
Skeleton of a European straight-tusked elephant (Palaeoloxodon antiquus), to which Chinese Palaeoloxodon specimens very closely resemble

The body size is very large, comparable to Indian Palaeoloxodon namadicus and the European straight-tusked elephant (P. antiquus), and much larger than Japanese specimens of Palaeoloxodon naumanni, with specimens from the Penghu Channel and Taiwan estimated to reach shoulder heights of over 4 metres (13 ft) and body masses over 13 tonnes (29,000 lb). While historically Chinese Palaeoloxodon remains were attributed to Palaeoloxodon namadicus, Chinese Palaeoloxodon remains display notable anatomical differences from Indian P. namadicus. In comparison to Indian P. namadicus, the postcranial skeleton is substantially more robust, and greatly resembles that of P. antiquus. The morphology of IVPP V4443 is also overall more similar to that of P. antiquus than P. namadicus, but the parietal-occipital crest at the top of the skull displays a very robust morphology closer to that of P. namadicus. Chinese Palaeoloxodon skulls also lack the infraorbital depression behind the eye socket found in P. namadicus individuals.

== Distribution and ecology ==
Remains of Palaeoloxodon are widespread in China, ranging from Northeast China to Xinjiang in the northwest to Hainan and Yunnan in the south, though most remains of Palaeoloxodon in China are from the North China Plain region.

In Late Pleistocene northern China, Palaeoloxodon co-occurred alongside the giant deer Sinomegaceros ordosianus, Merck's rhinoceros (Stephanorhinus kirchbergensis), the woolly rhinoceros (Coelodonta antiquitatis) the buffalo Bubalus wansjocki, aurochs (Bos primigenius), the Asiatic wild ass (Equus hemionus), goitered gazelles (Gazella subgutturosa) the camel Camelus knoblochi, cave hyenas (Crocuta ultima), tigers (Panthera tigris), and Przewalski's horse-like horses (Equus ex gr. przewalskii).

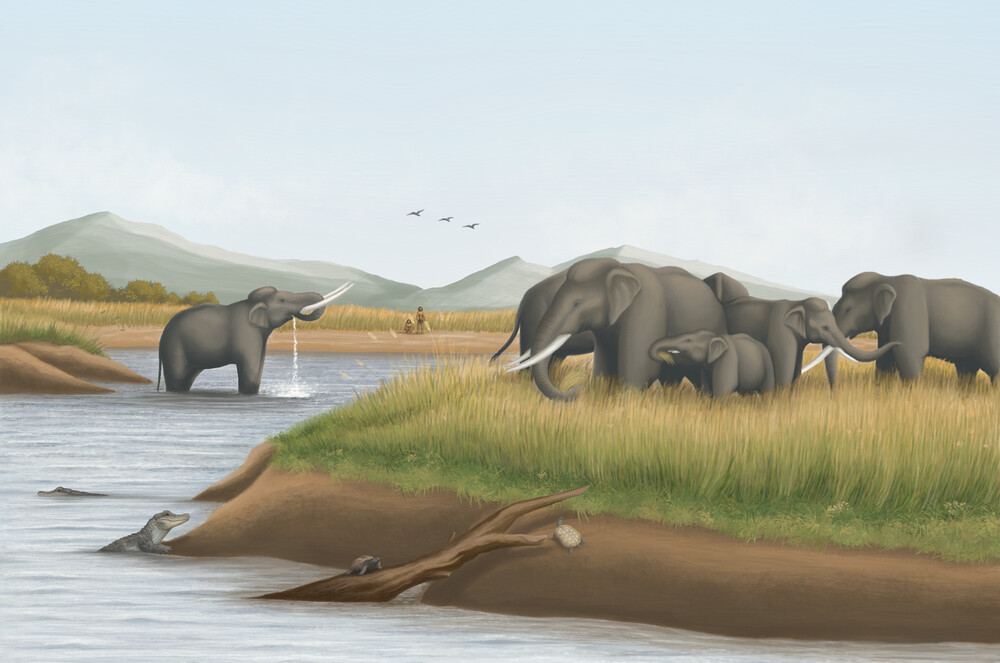
Life illustration of a herd of Chinese Palaeoloxodon in the now submerged landscape of the Penghu Channel, which formed a lowland area of grassland

In Penghu Channel deposits, remains of Palaeoloxodon co-occur alongside those of cave hyenas, tigers, brown bears, raccoon dogs (Nyctereutes procyonoides) wild horses (Equus ferus), the extinct buffaloes Bubalus teilhardi and Bubalus youngi, Père David's deer (Elaphurus davidianus), deer belonging to the genus Cervus, pigs (Sus sp. perhaps the wild boar Sus scrofa),^{supplemental material} as well as Denisovan archaic humans (Penghu 1). During glacial periods when the sea level was much lower than today, what is now the Penghu Channel is thought to have been a lowland area of grassland dominated by plants with C_{4}-type carbon fixation. Isotopic analysis of Penghu Palaeoloxodon specimens suggests that they had a C_{4} grass-heavy diet, similar to Indian P. namadicus, but in contrast to the European straight-tusked elephants, which incorporated much more browse (leaves and twigs of trees and shrubs) into their diet.

== Evolution and extinction ==
The oldest remains of Palaeoloxodon in North China date to the early Middle Pleistocene, around 700,000 years ago. Mitochondrial genomes retrieved from Chinese Palaeoloxodon individuals from North China reveal that like the European P. antiquus, they harboured mitochondrial lineages derived from those of African forest elephants as a result of hybridisation with that species prior to Palaeoloxodon leaving Africa. The close relationship between the mitochondrial genomes of a Chinese Palaeoloxodon and a European P. antiquus individual suggests that there may have been gene flow between the two populations following their initial divergence. In the early 2020s, it became suggested by some authors that Chinese Palaeoloxodon should be considered the same species as the European straight-tusked elephant Palaeoloxodon antiquus, given their very similar morphology.

The latest dates for Palaeoloxodon in China are from the Late Pleistocene, and a Holocene survival is not substantiated, though the actual timing of extinction is uncertain due to a lack of reliable dating.
