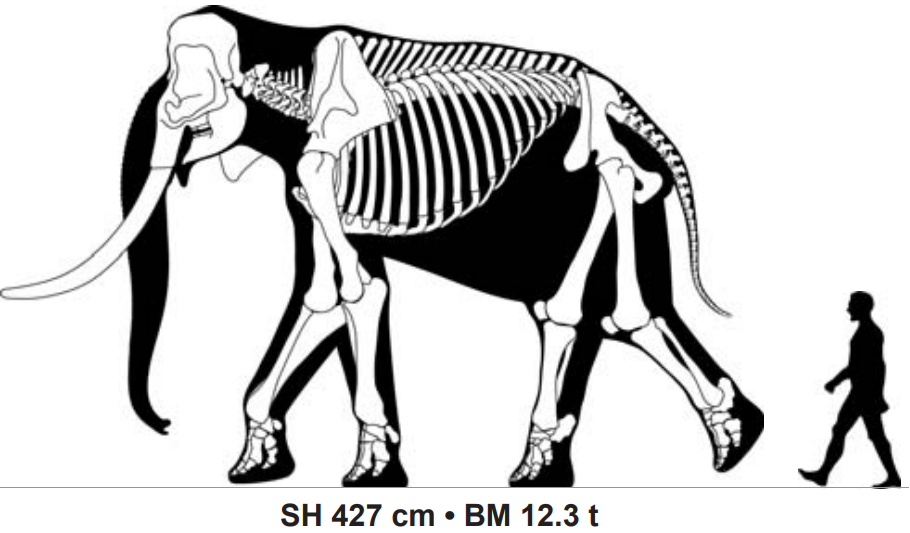
- Size comparison of a 40 year old adult male Palaeoloxodon recki atavus from Koobi Fora
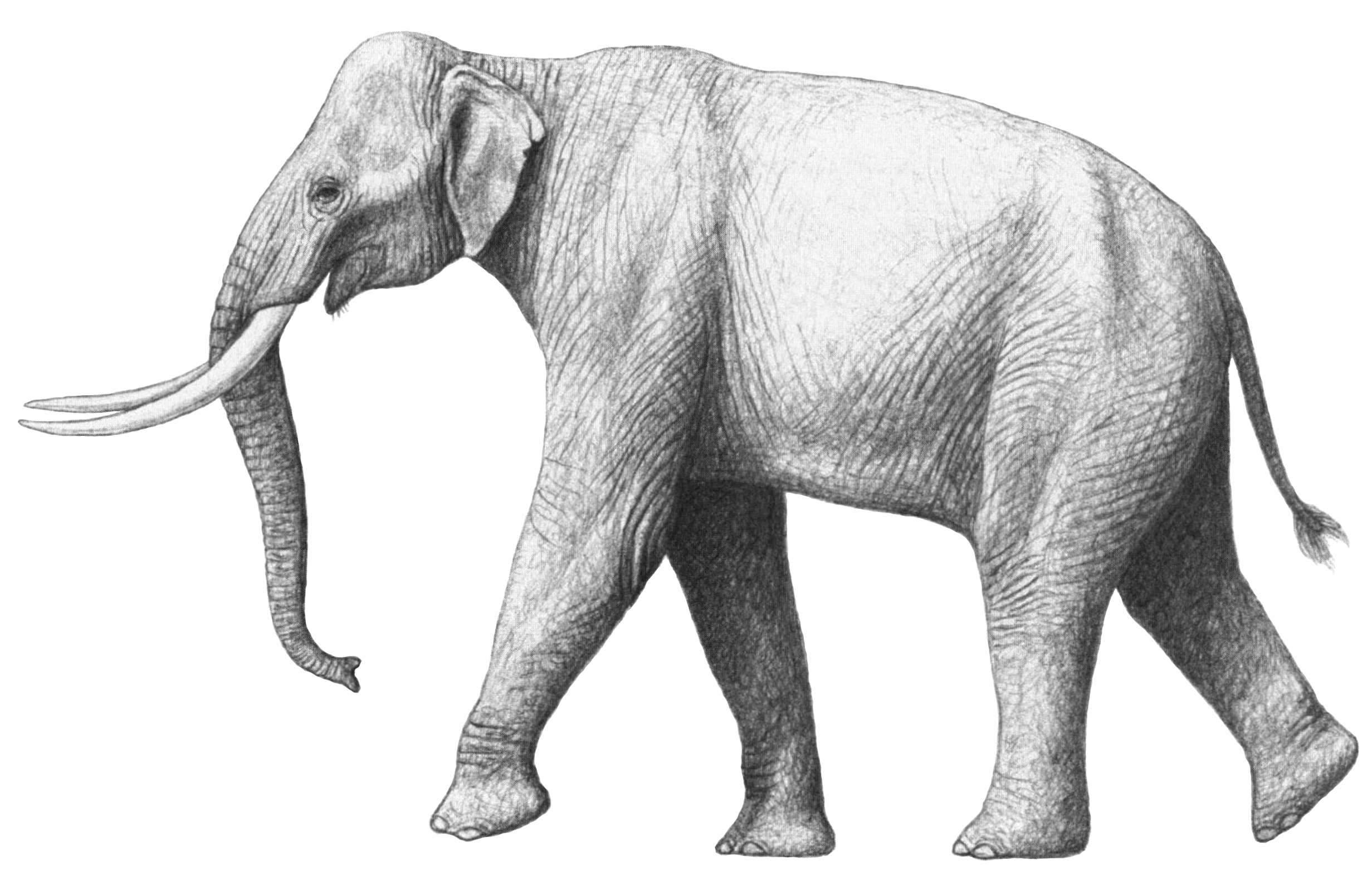
- Life restoration by Mauricio Antón

Scientific classification
- Kingdom: Animalia
- Phylum: Chordata
- Class: Mammalia
- Order: Proboscidea
- Family: Elephantidae
- Genus: †Palaeoloxodon
- Species: †P. recki

Binomial name
- †Palaeoloxodon recki (Dietrich, 1894)

Synonyms
- List: Elephas recki Dietrich, 1894; Elephas antiquus recki Dietrich, 1916; Archidiskodon recki Cooke, 1961

= Palaeoloxodon recki =

Palaeoloxodon recki Temporal range: Late Pliocene–Middle Pleistocene

Extinct species of elephant

Palaeoloxodon recki, often known by the synonym Elephas recki, is an extinct species of elephant native to Africa and West Asia from the Pliocene or Early Pleistocene to the Middle Pleistocene. During most of its existence, the species (in its broad sense) represented the dominant elephant species in East Africa. The species is divided into five roughly chronologically successive subspecies, collectively termed the "Elephas recki complex". While the type and latest subspecies P. recki recki as well as the preceding P. recki ileretensis are widely accepted to be closely related and ancestral to Eurasian Palaeoloxodon, the relationships of the other, chronologically earlier subspecies to P. recki recki, P. recki ileretensis and Palaeoloxodon are uncertain, with it being suggested they are unrelated and should be elevated to separate species.

== Taxonomy ==
The species was initially named from specimens found at Bed IV in Olduvai Gorge, Tanzania by Wilhelm Otto Dietrich in 1915, originally as a subspecies of the European straight-tusked elephant, what is now called Palaeoloxodon antiquus, as Elephas antiquus recki. It was named after Hans Reck, a German paleontologist and geologist who had done the initial surveying of the gorge in 1913, and had collected a considerable number of fossils from the locality. Camille Arambourg in 1942 described additional specimens of the species from Omo Valley in Ethiopia, and suggested that they were distinctive enough that they warranted being placed as the distinct species E. recki. The two deposits are not contemporaneous and the specimens from each locality are morphologically distinctive from each other, which has led to confusion about which locality represents the "typical" morphology of the species. The placement of E. recki in the genus Elephas was contested as early as 1942, when in a publication by Douglas Gordon MacInnes and Henry Fairfield Osborn's posthumous monograph on fossil proboscideans it was suggested that Elephas recki should instead be placed in Palaeoloxodon, though many later authors continued to place the species in the genus Elephas, treating Palaeoloxodon as a subgenus of Elephas. In 1961, H. Basil. S. Cooke once again removed E. recki from Elephas, reassigning it to the genus Archidiskodon. Four years later, Louis Leakey synonymised it once again with Elephas.

Michel Beden's publications during the 1980s on Elephas recki primarily focusing on molar morphology identified five successive subspecies, ordered here from oldest to youngest, with ages according to a 2023 work by William J. Sanders:

- E. r. brumpti Beden, 1980 Early Pliocene-~3.2 million years ago (mya)
- E. r. shungurensis Beden, 1980 ~3.2-2.3 mya
- E. r. atavus Arambourg, 1947 ~2.3-1.8 mya
- E. r. ileretensis Beden, 1987 ~1.8-1.4/1.6 mya
- E. r. recki (Dietrich, 1916) 1.6/1.4 mya-late Middle Pleistocene

The traditional definition of the species sensu lato including the 5 historically recognised subspecies has been termed the "Elephas recki complex".

For decades after Beden's publications, his view of "Elephas recki" as a succession of subspecies was accepted as orthodoxy. However, Beden's views of Elephas recki evolution were challenged by the work of Nancy Todd published in 2001 and 2005. Todd found that the different subspecies exhibited high variability in molar dimensions within subspecies, but low variability between the subspecies, and that not all of the subspecies clustered together with each other in cladistic analysis, as would be expected if they formed a single species, with E. r. brumpti E. r. shungurensis and E. r. atavus being placed separately from E. r. ileretensis and E. r. recki, and that the supposed subspecies substantially chronologically overlapped, though later work suggested that this chronological overlap was likely overstated.

A 2020 PhD thesis by Hanwen (Steven) Zhang, focusing primarily on skull morphology again challenged the monophyly of Elephas recki as a whole, finding that while E. r. ileretensis and E. recki recki has a close relationship with Eurasian Palaeoloxodon. which genetic data shows is closely related to African elephants (Loxodonta), the other named E. recki subspecies were likely unrelated, and more closely related to true members of the genus Elephas (which contains the living Asian elephant). Zhang suggested that E. r. brumpti was synonymous with "Elephas" planifrons, primarily known from the Late Pliocene-Early Pleistocene of the Indian subcontinent, and that this species should be placed into Phanagoroloxodon, while E. r. atavus should be elevated to full species status as a true member of the genus Elephas. However, while William J. Sanders accepted that E. r. brumpti was unlikely to be closely related to E. recki recki, he rejected the synonymity of E. r. brumpti with "Elephas" planifrons (though he suggested that the two may be sister species), and questioned their placement in Phanagoroloxodon, while he considered the relationship of E. r. atavus to E. recki recki to be uncertain.

Outside its core East African distribution. It has also been suggested that material from West Asia, including that from the earliest Middle Pleistocene (c. 780,000 years ago) Paleolithic archaeological site Gesher Bnot Ya'akov (previously attributed to P. antiquus) in northern Israel, the Middle Pleistocene (c. 500,000 years ago) Ti's al Ghadah site in northern Saudi Arabia, and the late Middle Pleistocene Shishan Marsh site in Jordan, belongs to P. recki recki.

== Description ==
Members of the species were larger than any living elephant. A large mostly complete male specimen of P. recki atavus from Koobi Fora, Kenya, suggested to have been approximately 40 years old when it died, was estimated in a 2016 study to have measured 4.27 metres (14.0 ft) tall at the shoulder and weighed 12.3 tonnes (27,000 lb), with the tusks of some P. recki individuals reaching 4 metres (13 ft) in length, and masses likely considerably in excess of 100 kilograms (220 lb). In 2024, Biswas, Chang and Tsai estimated its maximum shoulder height at 4.23 metres (13.9 ft), with the estimated body masses of 7 measured specimens ranging from 4.5–15.3 tonnes (9,900–33,700 lb). In comparison to most Eurasian species of Palaeoloxodon, the parieto-occipital crest of P. recki recki at the top of the skull is only weakly developed. The frons (forehead) is tall and biconvex. Like Eurasian Palaeoloxodon species, the premaxillary bones of P. recki recki containing the tusks flare laterally outwards. Over time the molar teeth of P. recki show an increasing number of lamellae, and taller crown height (hypsodonty).

== Ecology ==
All named subspecies of P/E. recki, regardless of true evolutionary relationships, are thought to have been dedicated grazers, with the molar teeth of later subspecies showing greater adaption to grazing than earlier subspecies. Carbon isotope analysis of P. recki recki suggests that while it always primarily consumed C_{4} grasses, it showed a degree of dietary flexibility, and particularly towards the end of its existence it consumed some C_{3} plants, likely including a degree of browse. Oxygen isotope analysis of P. recki recki also shows a shift from using stable, permanent water sources during the Early Pleistocene to adapting to using transient water sources during the Middle Pleistocene.

== Evolutionary history and extinction ==
Genetic evidence from Eurasian Palaeoloxodon suggests that around 1 million years ago, P. recki recki underwent a significant episode of introgressive hybridisation with West African populations of the African forest elephant, resulting in over 30% of the nuclear genome as well as the entire mitochondrial genome lineage of P. recki being replaced with those of African forest elephants.

Following the emergence of P. recki in Africa, at the end of the Early Pleistocene, around 800,000 years ago, a population of P. recki recki migrated out of Africa, giving rise to the Eurasian radiation of Palaeoloxodon. Its descendant taxon or last evolutionary stage, Palaeoloxodon jolensis, is known from remains found across Africa of late Middle Pleistocene to Late Pleistocene age, with a number of authors suggesting that P. jolensis likely became extinct at the Middle-Late Pleistocene boundary around 130,000 years ago. Following the extinction of P. jolensis it was replaced by the modern African bush elephant (Loxodonta africana). The extinction of the P. recki/jolensis lineage in Africa has either been attributed to the increasing aridification of Africa across the Middle Pleistocene, or the growing sophistication of human hunters.

== Relationship with humans ==
At several sites across Africa, remains of P. recki have been found associated with stone tools. In some cases these are likely coincidental, but in others which bears cut marks, these likely represent evidence of butchery by archaic humans. The oldest such site is Emiliano Aguirre Korongo in Olduvai Gorge, where a juvenile P. recki skeleton is associated with stone tools dating to around 1.8 million ago, though the evidence for butchery at the site has been considered equivocal. Other containing P. recki remains with cut marks and/or stone tools include Upper Bed II at the Bell's Korongo site in Olduvai Gorge, dating to around 1.35 million years ago, which has been suggested to be the oldest site in the world with reliable evidence of elephant butchery, associated with Oldowan-type stone tools, and the Olorgesailie Basin Member 1 Site 15 in Kenya, dated to 992–974,000 years ago, and the Nadung'a 4 site near Lake Turkana, Kenya, dating to approximately 700,000 years ago. The Barogali site in Djibouti, dating to 1.6-1.3 million years ago, where a disassociated specimen of P. recki (suggested to be E. recki atavus) was found with numerous stone tools (probably Oldowan) created onsite, has also been suggested to be a butchery site. The P. recki specimen from Gesher Bnot Ya'akov is associated with an Acheulean stone handaxe and other bifaced tools, and displays cut marks and fracture marks indicative of butchery, though the fracturing of the skull, which has been suggested to be the result of an attempt to extract the brain, may alternatively be the result of postmortem trampling.

At the T69 Complex in Olduvai Gorge, dating to around 1.5 million years ago, archaic humans using Acheulean tools knapped P. cf recki bones along with those of the large hippo Hippopotamus cf. gorgops to create bone tools. As of 2025, these are currently the oldest known bone tools.

== Gallery ==
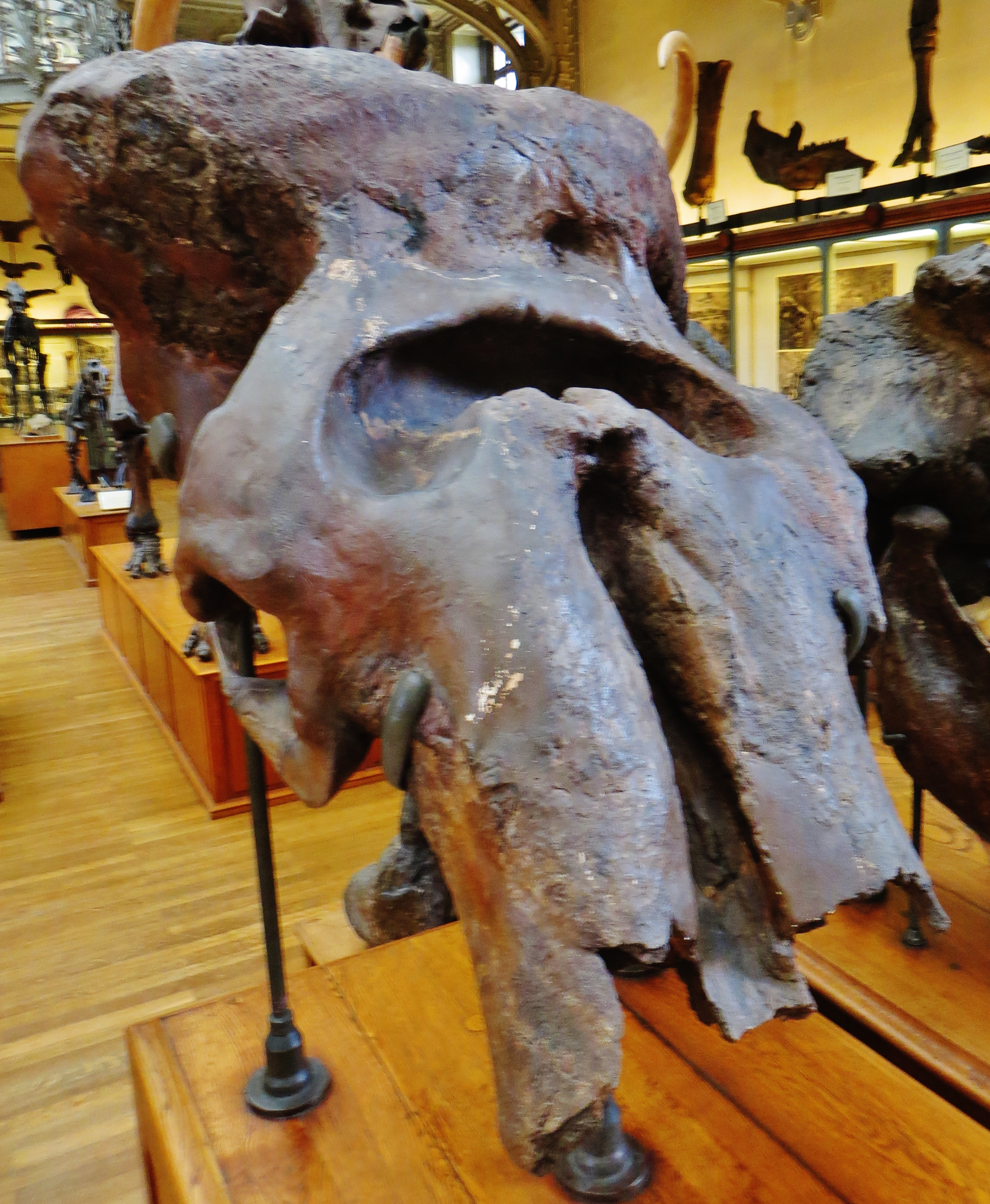
Skull at the Gallery of Paleontology and Comparative Anatomy, France

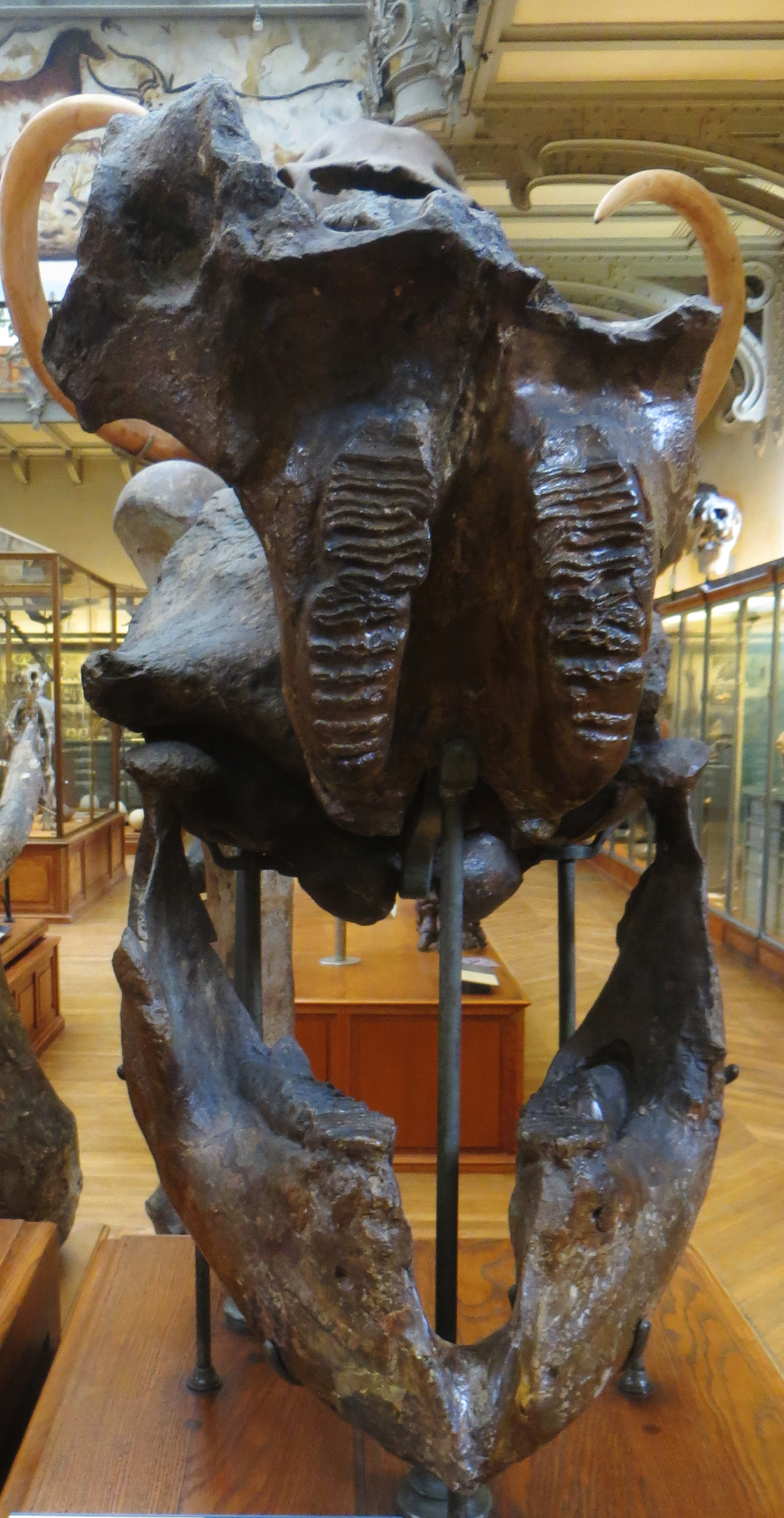
Underside of the skull and lower jaws at the Gallery of Paleontology and Comparative Anatomy

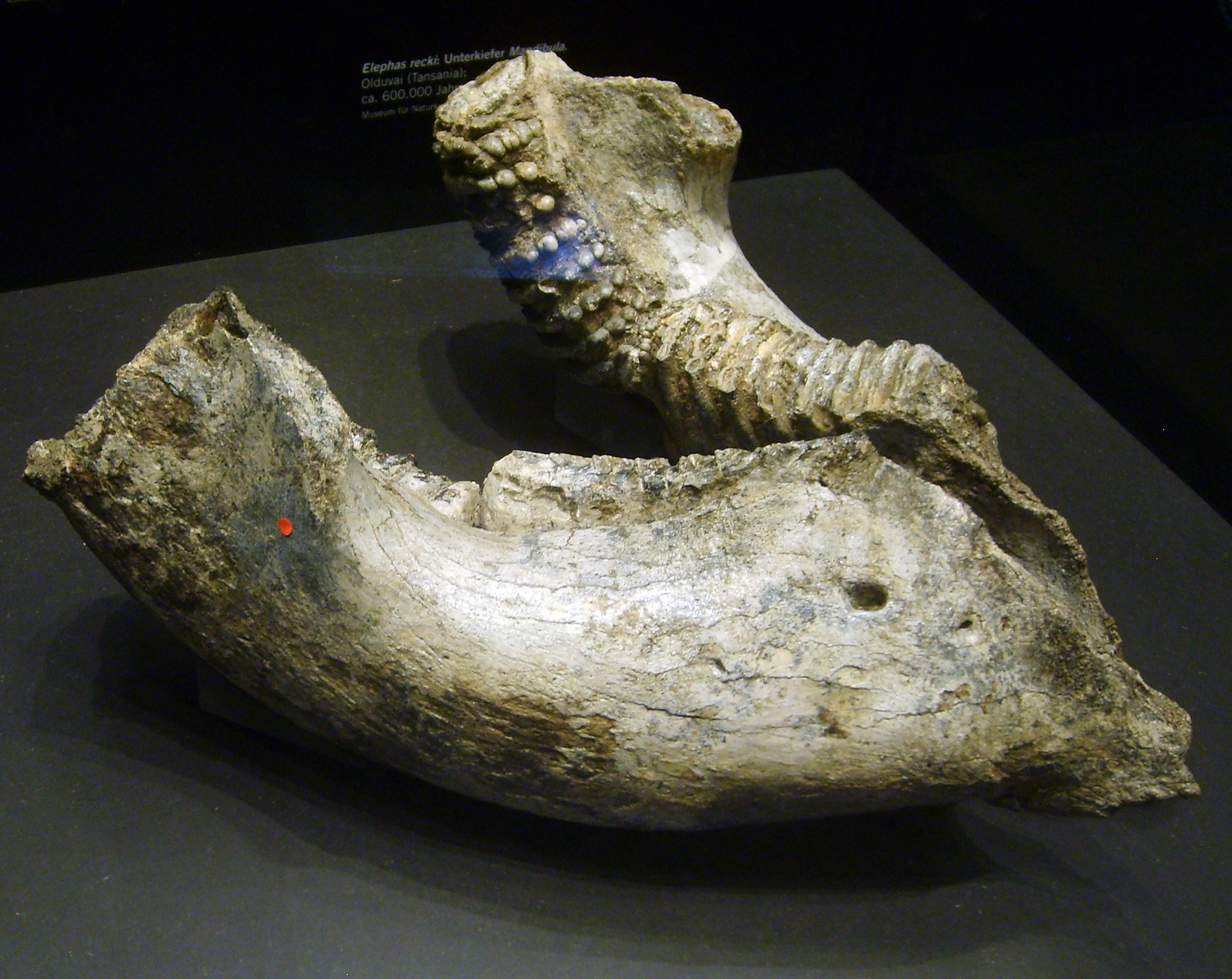
Lower jaw at the Museum für Naturkunde. Berlin
