= Wilhelm Otto Dietrich =

German paleontologist

Wilhelm Otto Dietrich (30 July 1881 – 26 March 1964) was a German (later East German) paleontologist who took a special interest in the study of Tertiary and Quaternary mammals. He was a curator of paleontology at the Natural History Museum, Berlin.

Dietrich was born in Senden near Ulm to mill manager Otto and Maria née Kramer. After studying at the Ulm gymnasium he joined the Technical University at Stuttgart before transferring to the University of Tübingen in 1901. He studied geology and paleontology and received a doctorate in 1903 under Ernst Koken. He studied petrology at Freburg and then worked from 1904 as an assistant to Ernst Anton Wülfing in Danzig. He developed otosclerosis in 1907 and had to move to Switzerland for treatment but he progressively lost hearing and became completely deaf. He became an assistant at Stuttgart under Eberhard Fraas and joined an excavation at Steinheim-on-Murr where the dig discovered a giant deer and a mammoth (Elephas primigenius). He then took a special interest in mammals. In 1911 he worked with Wilhelm von Branca at the Natural History Museum in Berlin where he later became a curator. He retired in 1959 but continued to work and during World War II he and his wife lived in the basement of the museum. He died from pneumonia in 1964.

Dietrich married Lotte Trendelenburg, daughter of a privy councillor, in 1921 and their only son died at the front during World War II. He was awarded a Hans Stille Medal in 1957 and the silver Patriotic Order of Merit in 1962.
