= Lake Nojiri Naumann Elephant Museum =

- 野尻湖ナウマンゾウ博物館
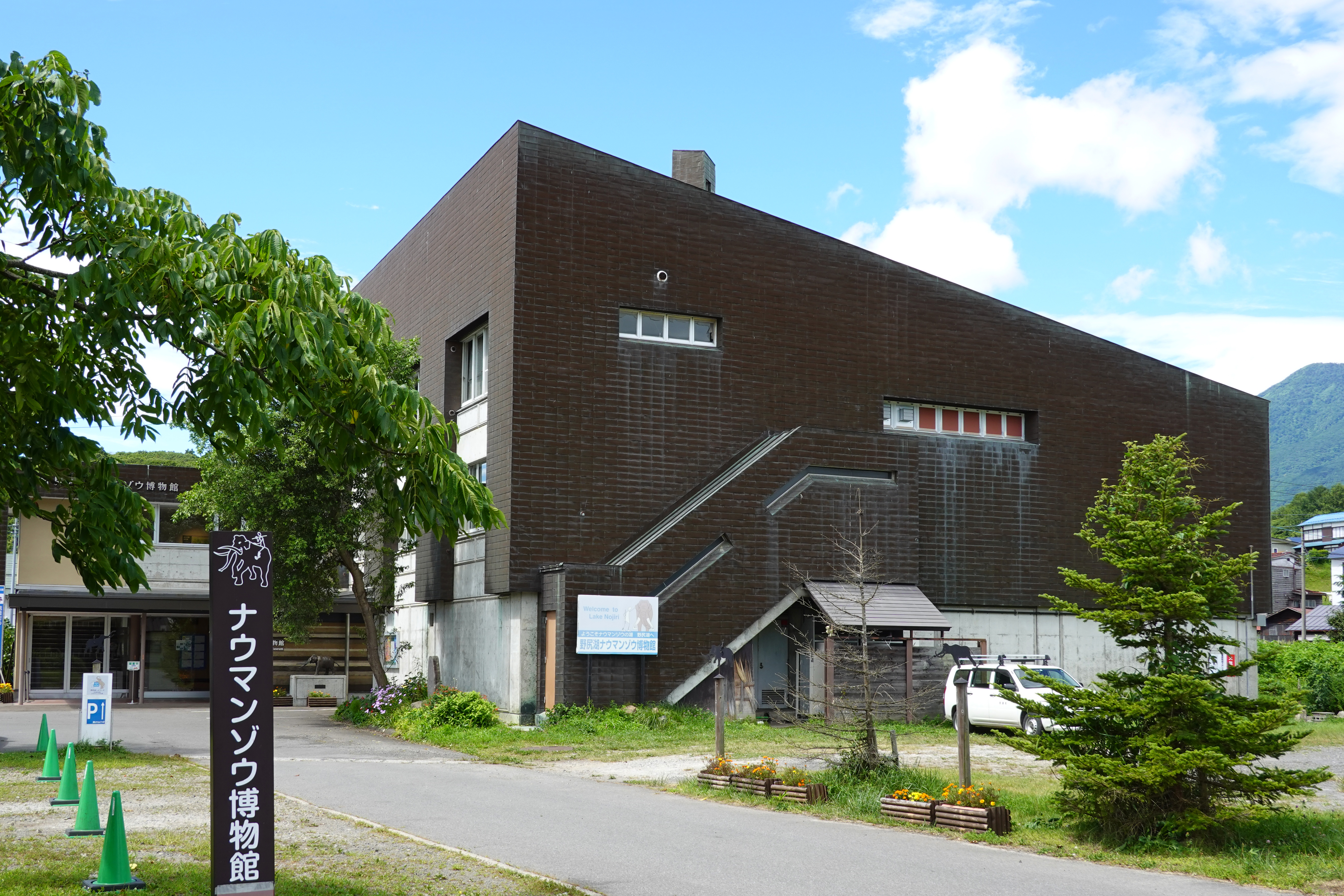
- Interactive map of the Lake Nojiri Naumann Elephant Museum area

General information
- Location: 287-5 Nojiri, Shinano, Nagano Prefecture, Japan
- Coordinates: 36°49′56″N 138°12′22″E
- Opened: 1 July 1984

Website
- Official website

Lake Nojiri Naumann Elephant Museum (野尻湖ナウマンゾウ博物館, Nojiri-ko Nauman-zō Hakubutsukan) opened on the shore of Lake Nojiri in Shinano, Nagano Prefecture, Japan, in 1984. Initially the Nojiri-ko Museum (野尻湖博物館), it was renamed the Lake Nojiri Naumann Elephant Museum in 1996. The collection focuses on finds from the excavations at Lake Nojiri that began in 1962 and continue today, most notably fossils of Naumann's elephant and the extinct giant deer Sinomegaceros yabei, along with the stone and bone tools of those who hunted them some forty thousand years ago.

== See also ==
- List of Historic Sites of Japan (Nagano)
- Nagano Prefectural Museum of History
- Japanese Paleolithic
- Heinrich Edmund Naumann
