= Chūrui Naumann Elephant Museum =

- 忠類ナウマン象記念館
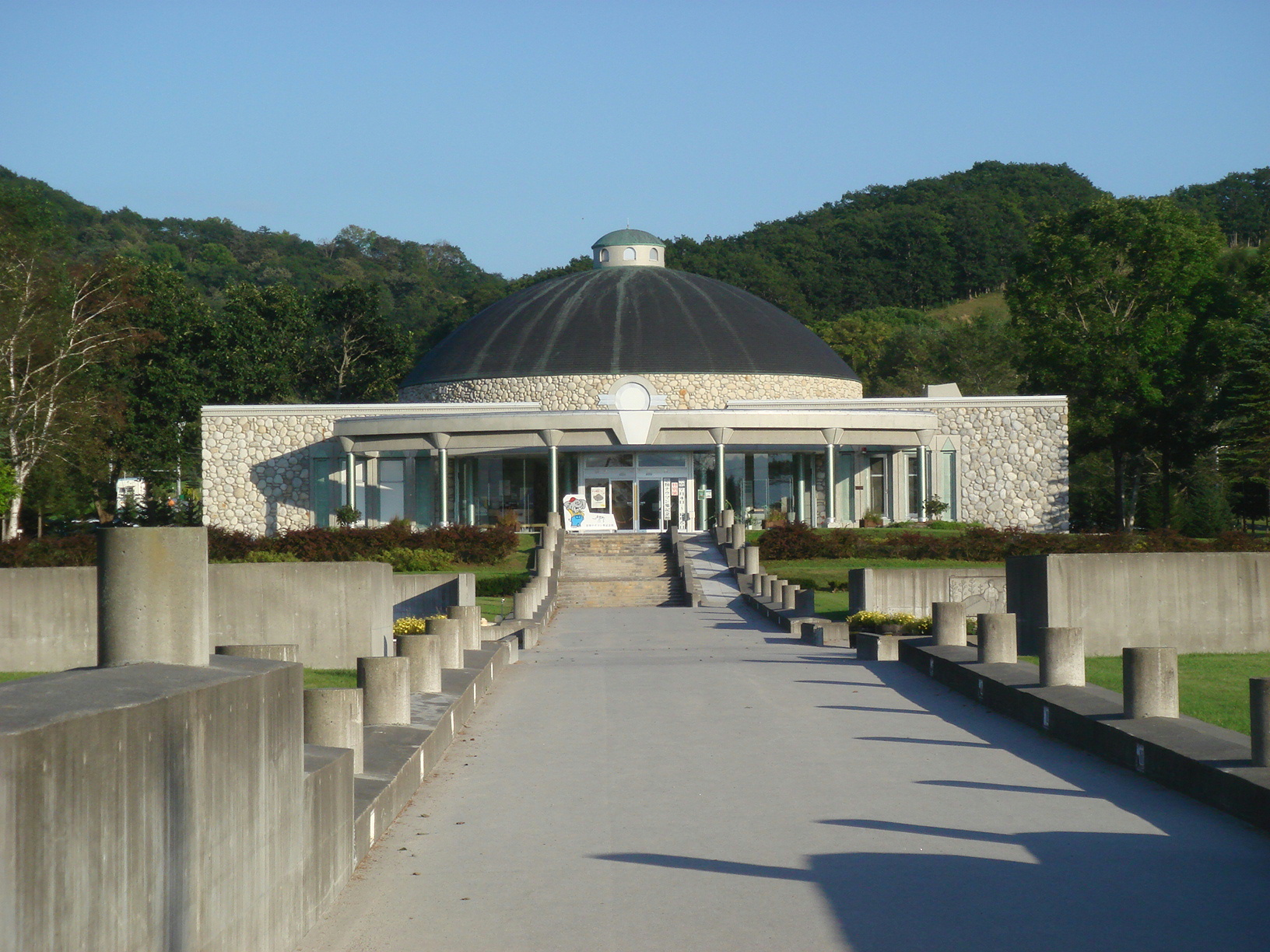
- The museum is modelled on Naumann's elephant, with the dome representing its body, the four corners its paws, the entrance its head, the pebble walls its skin, and the long approach its trunk and tusks

- Location within Hokkaido Location within Japan

General information
- Location: 383-1 Chūrui Shirogane-machi, Makubetsu, Hokkaidō, Japan
- Coordinates: 42°33′29″N 143°18′00″E
- Opened: August 1988

Website
- Official website

The Chūrui Naumann Elephant Museum (忠類ナウマン象記念館, Chūrui Nauman-zō Kinenkan) opened in Makubetsu, Hokkaidō, Japan in 1988. It commemorates the chance discovery of a fossilized Naumann's elephant in Chūrui, now Makubetsu, on 26 July 1969, during construction work on a farm road: the youth who unearthed the initial piece with his pickaxe crying out "this is an elephant's tooth" (「これは象の歯だ」). During the course of three subsequent excavations, some forty-seven bones were recovered, representing 70–80% of the total skeleton. Twenty-two museums in Japan and the rest of the world now house the reconstructed elephant's remains from the Chrui finds.

== See also ==
- Lake Nojiri Naumann Elephant Museum
- Blind men examining an elephant
