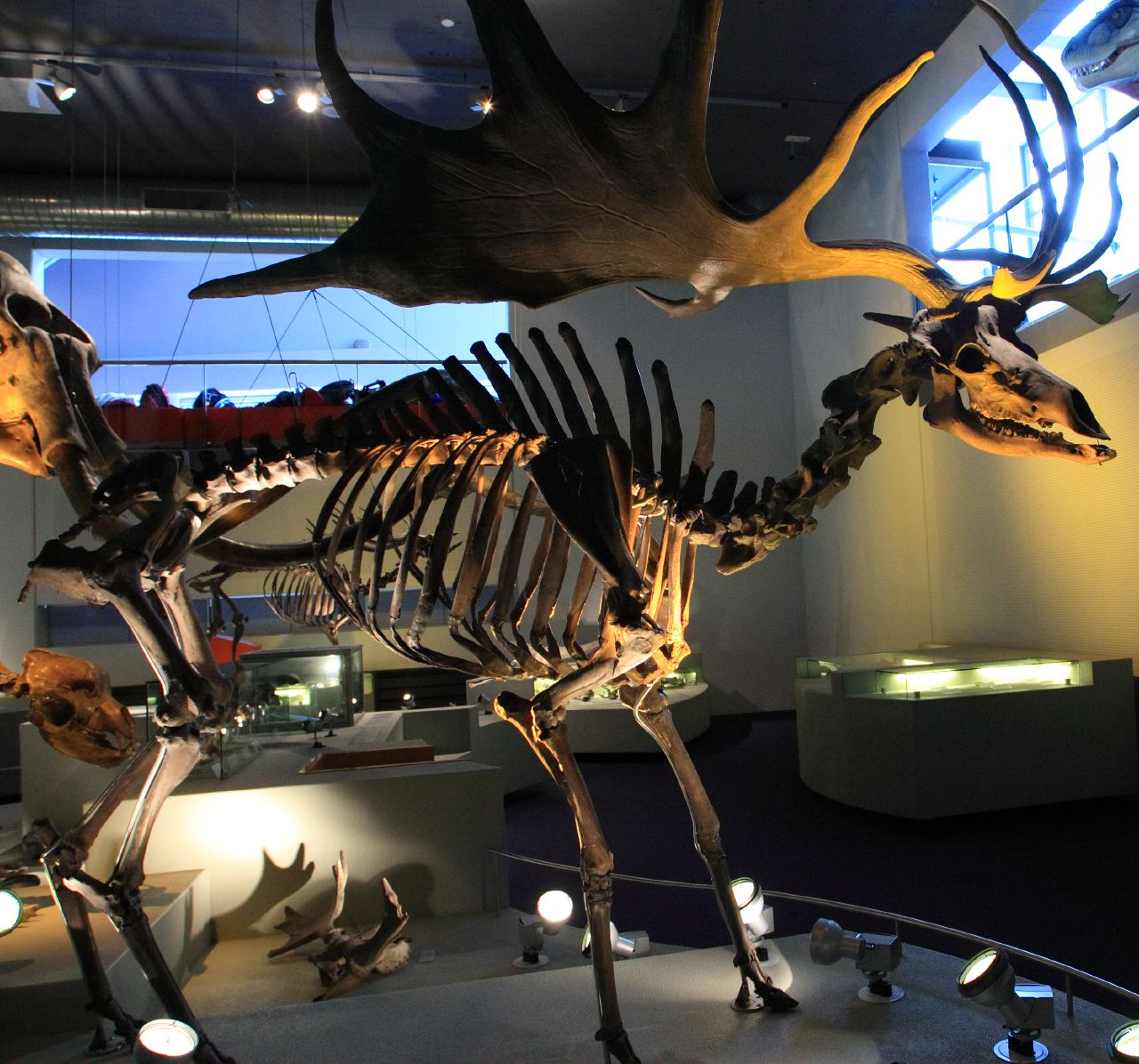
- Skeleton of Megaloceros giganteus

Scientific classification
- Kingdom: Animalia
- Phylum: Chordata
- Class: Mammalia
- Order: Artiodactyla
- Family: Cervidae
- Tribe: Cervini
- Genus: †Megaloceros; Brookes, 1828

Species
- †M. giganteus (type); †M. matritensis; †M. novocarthaginiensis; †M. savini

Synonyms
- Megaceros (Owen, 1844)

= Megaloceros =

Megaloceros Temporal range: late Early Pleistocene to Middle Holocene, ~1.2–0.0077 Ma

Extinct genus of deer

Megaloceros (from Greek: μεγαλος megalos "great" + κερας keras "horn, antler") is an extinct genus of deer whose members lived throughout Eurasia from the Pleistocene to the early Holocene. The type and only undisputed member of the genus, Megaloceros giganteus, vernacularly known as the "Irish elk" or "giant deer", is also the best known. Fallow deer are thought to be their closest living relatives. Megaloceros has been suggested to be closely related to other genera of "giant deer", like the East Asian genus Sinomegaceros and the largely European Praemegaceros, the species of both genera having been historically attributed to Megaloceros.

== Nomenclatural history ==
Megaloceros giganteus was originally described in 1799 as Alce gigantea by Johann Friedrich Blumenbach based on specimens found in Ireland. With Alce being a variant of the genus Alces used for elk/moose.

In 1827 Joshua Brookes, in a listing of his zoological collection, named the Megaloceros (spelled Megalocerus in the earlier editions) in the following passage:

Amongst other Fossil Bones, there [are] ... two uncommonly fine Crania of the Megalocerus antiquorum (Mihi). (Irish), with unusually fine horns, (in part restored)

— Joshua Brookes, Brookesian Museum. The Museum of Joshua Brookes, Esq. Anatomical and Zoological Preparations, p 20.

The etymology being from Greek: μεγαλος megalos "great" + κερας keras "horn, antler". The type and only species named in the description being Megaloceros antiquorum, based on Irish remains now considered to belong to M. giganteus, making the former a junior synonym. The original description was considered by Adrian Lister in 1987 to be inadequate for a taxonomic definition. In 1828 Brookes published an expanded list in the form of a catalogue for an upcoming auction, which included the Latin phrase "Cornibus deciduis palmatis" ("palmate deciduous horns") as a description of the remains. The 1828 publication was approved by International Commission on Zoological Nomenclature (ICZN) in 1977 as an available publication for the basis of zoological nomenclature. Adrian Lister in 1987 judged that "the phase "Cornibus deciduis palmatis" constitutes a definition sufficient under the [International Code of Zoological Nomenclature] (article 12) to validate Megalocerus." The original spelling of Megalocerus was never used after its original publication.

In 1844 Richard Owen named another synonym of the Irish elk, including it within the newly named subgenus Megaceros, Cervus (Megaceros) hibernicus. This has been suggested to be derived from another junior synonym of the Irish elk described by J. Hart in 1825, Cervus megaceros. Despite being a junior synonym, Megaloceros remained in obscurity and Megaceros became the common genus name for the taxon. The combination "Megaceros giganteus" was in use by 1871. George Gaylord Simpson in 1945 revived the original Megaloceros name, which became progressively more widely used, until a taxonomic decision in 1989 by the ICZN confirmed the priority of Megaloceros over Megaceros, and Megaloceros to be the correct spelling.

== Taxonomic composition ==
Other than the type species Megaloceros giganteus, the composition of the genus is contested. While considered to be part of the genus Megaloceros by many authors, M. savini and related taxa (novocarthaginiensis and matritensis) are split into the separate genus Praedama by some scholars.

The genus Megaloceros is widely agreed to belong the subfamily Cervinae. Megaloceros has often been placed in the tribe Megacerini, alongside other "giant deer" genera like Sinomegaceros and Praemegaceros, though the taxonomy regarding giant deer as whole is uncertain and contested. A close relationship with Sinomegaceros has been supported by mitochondrial DNA, which found that the mitochondrial sequences of M. giganteus are nested within those of Sinomegaceros, suggesting that the two lineages interbred with each other after the initial split between them, with all mitochondrial genomes of Sinomegaceros more closely related to those of M. giganteus than to their closest living relative Dama.

Relationships of Megaloceros mitochondrial genomes, after Xiao et al. 2023.

- - Dama
  - †Sinomegaceros+†Megaloceros
    - †Sinomegaceros pachyosteus (China)
    - - †Megaloceros giganteus (Russia, Belgium)
      - - †Sinomegaceros ordosianus (China, Russia)
        - - †Sinomegaceros pachyosteus (China)
          - †Megaloceros giganteus (Europe, Russia)

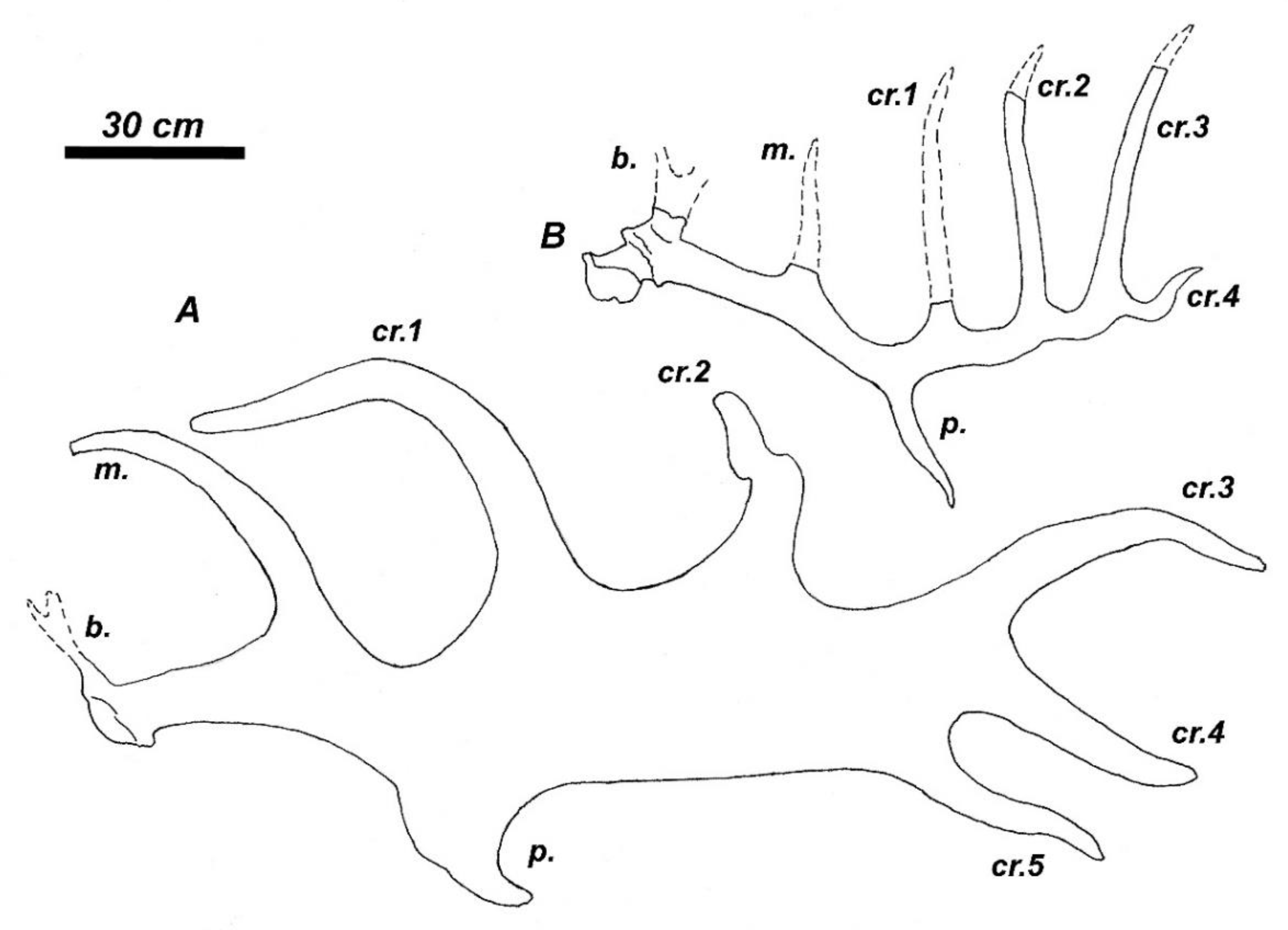
Antlers of M. giganteus (bottom) and Praedama (often included in Megaloceros)

=== Species ===
Species of the genus Sinomegaceros and Praemegaceros, whose species were often historically and sometimes still assigned to Megaloceros (e.g.), are discussed in their respective genus articles and not in this section. Megaceroides algericus from the Late Pleistocene to Holocene of North Africa has been considered to be closely related and possibly derived from Megaloceros by some authors.

Species ordered from oldest to youngest:

M. novocarthaginiensis
Described from the latest Early Pleistocene 0.9-0.8 Ma of Cueva Victoria in Spain. Known from antlers, teeth and postcranial material. Related and possibly ancestral to M. savini
M. savini
Middle Pleistocene European species, with a temporal range spanning approximately 750-450,000 years ago, slightly larger than a caribou/reindeer, first fossils found near Sainte Savine, France and near Soria, Spain. Its antlers were straight, with thornlike prongs. The lowermost prongs near the base were palmate. Has been suggested to comprise the separate genus Praedama.
It is suggested to have been a mixed feeder or grazer.
M. matritensis
Mid-Pleistocene species, lived around 400-300,000 years ago near present-day Madrid, Spain, being contemporary with M. giganteus. The species had enlarged premolars, very thick molar enamel, and a low mandibular condyle. The species itself formed part of the diet of people which lived in the area. M. matritensis fossils are found associated to stone tools of late Acheulean and early Mousterian type. The species is thought to be descended from M. savini
M. giganteus
Largest, best known, and among the last species of the genus that stands about 2 m (6.6 ft) at the shoulders. Lived throughout Eurasia, from Ireland to Siberia during the late Middle Pleistocene to early Holocene.

"M". stravpolensis from the Early Pleistocene of Southwestern Russia has been subsequently suggested to belong to Arvernoceros. The species "Megaloceros" cretensis from the island of Crete has been moved to the genus Candiacervus.
