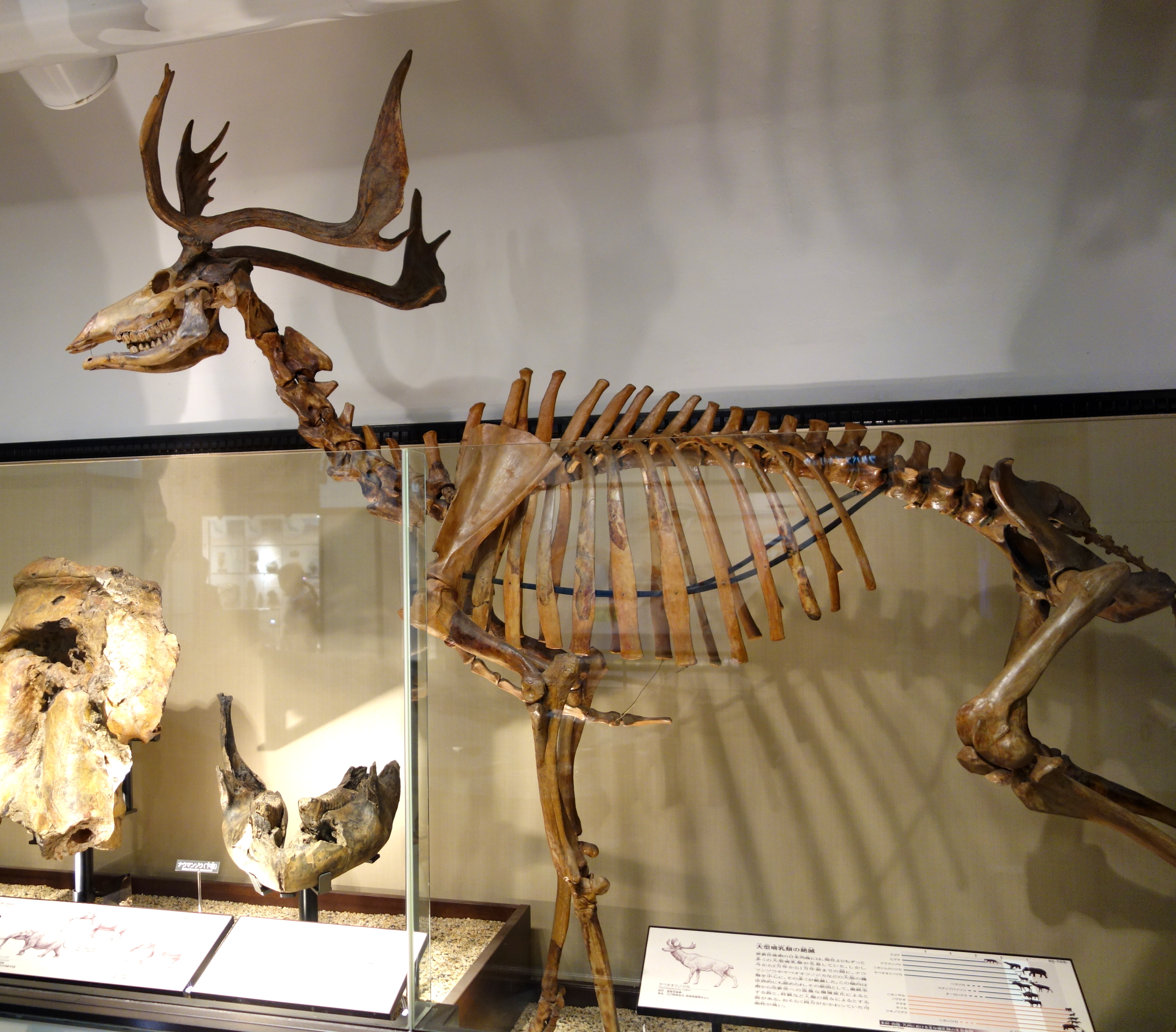
- Sinomegaceros yabei at the National Museum of Nature and Science, Tokyo
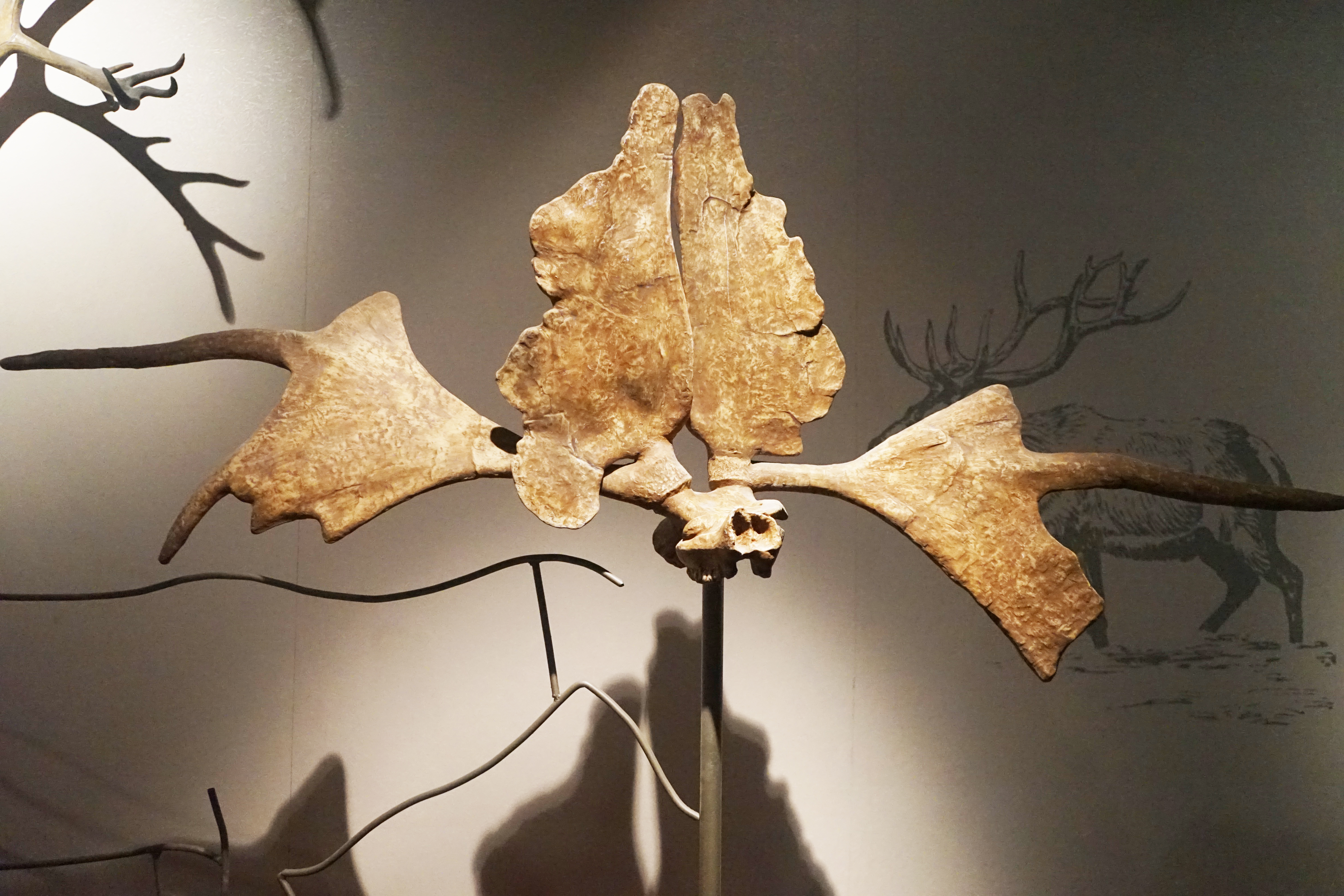
- Sinomegaceros pachyosteus

Scientific classification
- Kingdom: Animalia
- Phylum: Chordata
- Class: Mammalia
- Order: Artiodactyla
- Family: Cervidae
- Tribe: Cervini
- Genus: †Sinomegaceros; Dietrich, 1933

Species
- S. yabei Shikama, 1938; S. pachyosteus Young, 1932; S. flabellatus Teilhard de Chardin, 1936; S. konwanlinensis Chow, Hu and Lee, 1965; S. tadzhikistanis Vislobokova, 1988; S. ordosianus Young, 1932

Synonyms
- Cervus (Sinomegaceroides) Shikama, 1949; Megaceros (Sinomegaceros) Kahlke & Hu, 1957; Mongolomegaceros Shikama & Okafuji, 1958; Megaceraxis Matsumoto, 1963

= Sinomegaceros =

Sinomegaceros Temporal range: Early Pleistocene–Late Pleistocene

Extinct genus of giant deer native to Asia

Sinomegaceros is an extinct genus of deer known from the Late Pliocene/Early Pleistocene to Late Pleistocene of Central and East Asia. It is considered to be part of the group of "giant deer" (often referred to collectively as members of the tribe Megacerini), with a close relationship to Megaloceros. Many members of the genus are noted for their distinctive palmate antler brow tines.

== Taxonomy ==
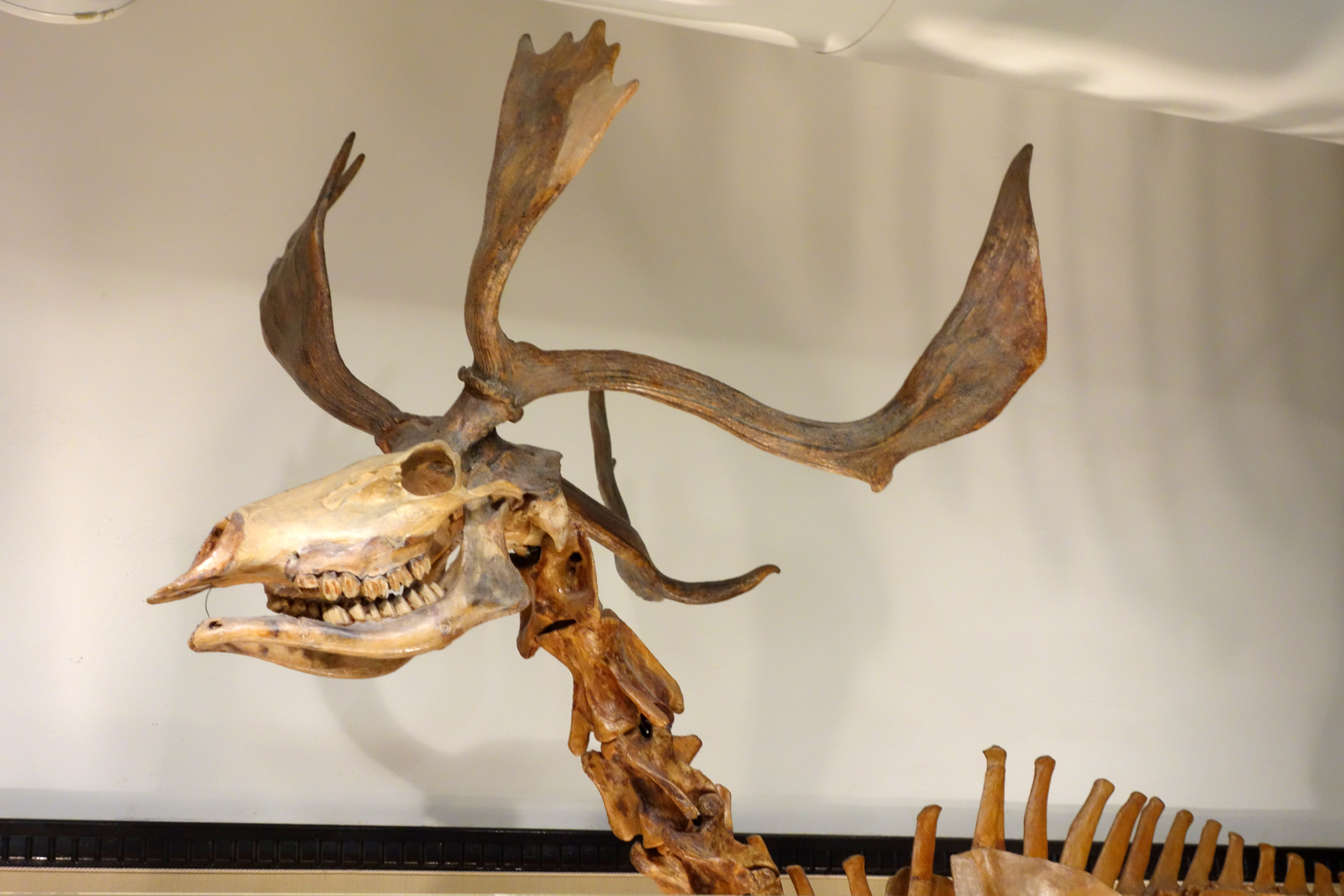
Sinomegaceros yabei head closeup

The first species of the genus S. ordosianus and S. pachyosteus were named by pioneering Chinese paleontologist C. C. Young as species of Cervus in 1932 for material from Zhoukoudian. In a review of the paper the subsequent year Dietrich created the name Sinomegaceros as a subgenus of Cervus to house the species, with S. pachyosteus as the type species. Due to the fact that the name was not published in a formal research paper, it was not widely used for several decades after publication. The species S. yabei was named in 1938. In the following decades various researchers considered it a subgenus of Megaloceros, or a distinct genus. Several named species are likely to be junior synonyms.

Named species include:

- Sinomegaceros tadzhikistanis, known from the Late Pliocene-Early Pleistocene of Tajikistan
- Sinomegaceros konwanlinensis, from Gongwaling in Northern China, dating to the Early Pleistocene, around 1.6 million years ago.
- Sinomegaceros fabellatus, known from the late Early Pleistocene-Early Middle Pleistocene of China
- Sinomegaceros sangwonensis known from the mid-Middle Pleistocene of China
- Sinomegaceros luochuanensis known from the late Middle Pleistocene of China
- Sinomegaceros baotouensis known from the Late Pleistocene of China
- Sinomegaceros pachyosteus known from the early Middle Pleistocene to the late Middle Pleistocene or Late Pleistocene of China
- Sinomegaceros ordosianus, known from the late Middle Pleistocene-Late Pleistocene of China and small adjacent areas of Russian Siberia
- Sinomegaceros yabei late Middle Pleistocene-Late Pleistocene of Japan

Indeterminate remains of Sinomegaceros are also known from the Late Pleistocene of the Korean Peninsula.

Sinomegaceros has often been considered closely related to other genera "giant deer", like Praemegaceros and Megaloceros, as part of the tribe Megacerini. Mitochondrial genomes from Late Pleistocene Chinese and Siberian Sinomegaceros (including S. ordosianus and S. pachyosteus) indicate that the mitochondrial diversity of the Irish elk (Megaloceros giganteus, also known as the giant deer) is nested within the diversity of Sinomegaceros, suggesting that the two lineages interbred after their initial split. This interbreeding may have occurred in the contact region between the two groups in Siberia. Relationships of Sinomegaceros mitochondrial genomes after Xiao, et al. 2023

- Dama
- Sinomegaceros+Megaloceros
  - Sinomegaceros pachyosteus (China)
  - - Megaloceros giganteus (Russia, Belgium)
    - - Sinomegaceros ordosianus (China, Russia)
      - - Sinomegaceros pachyosteus (China)
        - Megaloceros giganteus (Europe, Russia)

== Description ==
External image
- Largely complete antler of Sinomegaceros ordosianus

Species of Sinomegaceros were large deer, with estimated body masses for Chinese Pleistocene species ranging from 220 kilograms (490 lb) in S. pachyosteus to 365 kilograms (805 lb) in S. konwanlinensis, with S. ordosianus estimated at 330 kilograms (730 lb). Remains attributed to the genus in Central Asia are even larger, with the body mass of S. tadzhikistanis being estimated at 465 kilograms (1,025 lb), while an indeterminate species from the Pleistocene locality of Lakhuti 2 in Tajikistan was estimated 560 kilograms (1,230 lb), making it one of the largest deer known.^{supplemental material} The antlers have palmate (flat and broad) brow tines (the first major branch closest to the base of the antler), with the palmation generally orientated transversely and vertically. The mandibles of Sinomegaceros, like those of Megaloceros giganteus, are robust and display pachyostosis (thickening/high density) with the robustness being the most extreme in S. pachyosteus.

== Ecology ==
External image
- Life restoration of Sinomegaceros ordosianus by Xu Yong

S. yabei and S. pachyosteus are suggested to have been grazers.

In Late Pleistocene northern China, Sinomegaceros ordosianus co-occurred alongside Chinese Palaeoloxodon elephants, Merck's rhinoceros (Stephanorhinus kirchbergensis), the woolly rhinoceros (Coelodonta antiquitatis) the buffalo Bubalus wansjocki, aurochs (Bos primigenius), the Asiatic wild ass (Equus hemionus), goitered gazelles (Gazella subgutturosa) the camel Camelus knoblochi, cave hyenas (Crocuta ultima), tigers (Panthera tigris), and Przewalski's horse-like horses (Equus ex gr. przewalskii).

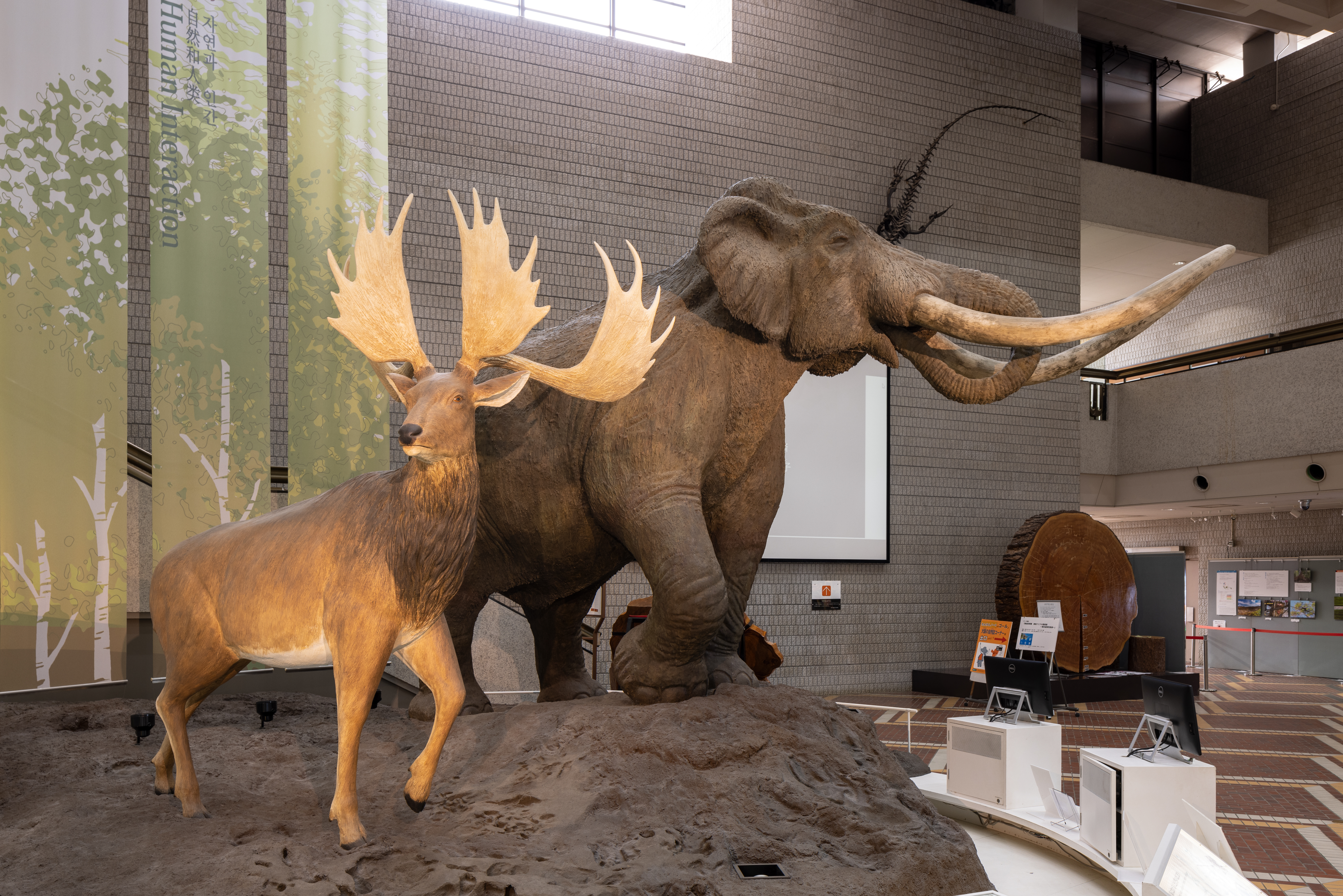
Life restoration of Sinomegaceros yabei, next to its contemporary, the extinct elephant Palaeoloxodon naumanni

In Middle-Late Pleistocene Japan, S. yabei lived alongside the elephant Palaeoloxodon naumanni, sika deer (Cervus nippon), Japanese serow (Capricornis crispus), moose (Alces alces), Siberian musk deer (Moschus moschiferus), the extinct steppe bison (Bison priscus) brown bears (Ursus arctos), black bears (Ursus thibetanus), wolves (Canis lupus), and cave lions (Panthera spelaea).

== Evolution ==
One of the oldest species in the genus is Sinomegaceros tadzhikistanis, known from the Late Pliocene-Early Pleistocene of Tajikistan. The oldest species of the genus in China is Sinomegaceros konwanlinensis, from Gongwaling in Northern China, dating to the Early Pleistocene, around 1.6 million years ago. S. fabellatus is known from fossils spanning the latest Early Pleistocene to early Middle Pleistocene. S. sangwonensis is known from fossils spanning the mid-Middle Pleistocene. The oldest fossils of S. pachyosteus date to around 700,000 years ago, during the early Middle Pleistocene. While some authors suggest youngest fossils of the species date to the late Middle Pleistocene, other sources have suggested that the species persisted into the Late Pleistocene, with reported radiocarbon dates as recent as 35,000 years ago. The species S. yabei and S. ordosianus first appeared during the late Middle Pleistocene. It has been suggested that both S. pachyosteus and S. yabei ultimately derive from S. konwanlinensis. While often stated to have become extinct around 12,000 years ago, a lack of high-quality radiocarbon dates makes the time of extinction uncertain for S. yabei, with the only certain radiocarbon dates dating to around 40,000 years ago. Radiocarbon dates for S. ordosianus in Northeastern China extend as recently as the Last Glacial Maximum, around 22,000 years ago.

== Relationship with humans ==
Remains of S. yabei at Lake Nojiri in Nagano Prefecture of Honshu, Japan, dating to approximately 37,900 to 42,600 years Before Present have been found associated with spear-shaped wood pieces and large pebbles, with the long bones fractured, with their fragments bearing percussive marks, suggesting that these deer (alongside elephants belonging to the species Palaeoloxodon naumanni) were butchered by humans at the site, with the long bones likely cracked to extract bone marrow. S. ordosianus is suggested to have likely been hunted by archaic humans, based on the finds of its remains in Chinese Paleolithic archaeological sites.
