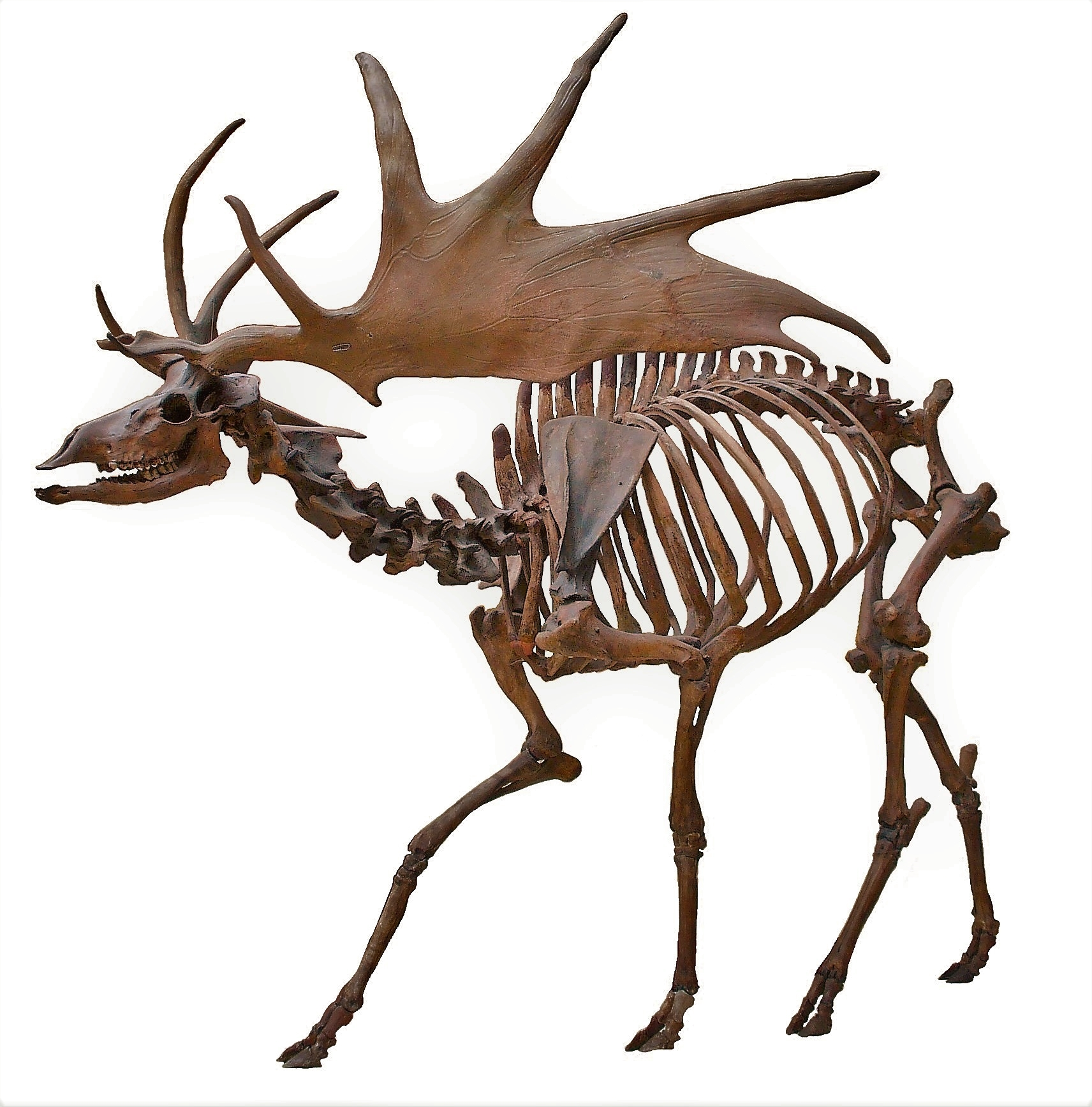
- Mounted skeleton

Scientific classification
- Kingdom: Animalia
- Phylum: Chordata
- Class: Mammalia
- Order: Artiodactyla
- Family: Cervidae
- Genus: †Megaloceros
- Species: †M. giganteus

Binomial name
- †Megaloceros giganteus (Blumenbach, 1799)
- Time averaged range of M. giganteus during the Late Pleistocene

Synonyms
- Alce gigantea Blumenbach, 1799; Cervus hibernus Desmarest, 1820; Cervus megaceros Hart, 1825; Megaloceros antiquorum Brookes, 1828; Cervus euryceros (Aldrovandi, 1621), Hibbert, 1830; Cervus megaceros irlandicus Fischer, 1838; Cervus (Megaceros) hibernicus Owen, 1844; Cervus giganteus Reynolds, 1929; Megaceros giganteus latifrons Raven,1935

= Irish elk =

Irish elk Temporal range: Middle Pleistocene to Middle Holocene, 0.45–0.0077 Ma

Extinct species of deer

The Irish elk (Megaloceros giganteus), also called the giant deer or Irish deer, is an extinct species of deer in the genus Megaloceros and is one of the largest deer that ever lived. Its range extended across northern Eurasia during the Pleistocene, from Ireland (where it is known from abundant remains found in bogs) to Lake Baikal in Siberia. The most recent remains of the species have been radiocarbon dated to about 7,700 years ago in western Russia. Its antlers, which can span over 4.2 metres (13.8 ft) across, are the largest known of any deer. It is not closely related to either living species called the elk, with it being widely agreed that its closest living relatives are fallow deer (Dama).

== Taxonomy ==
=== Research history ===
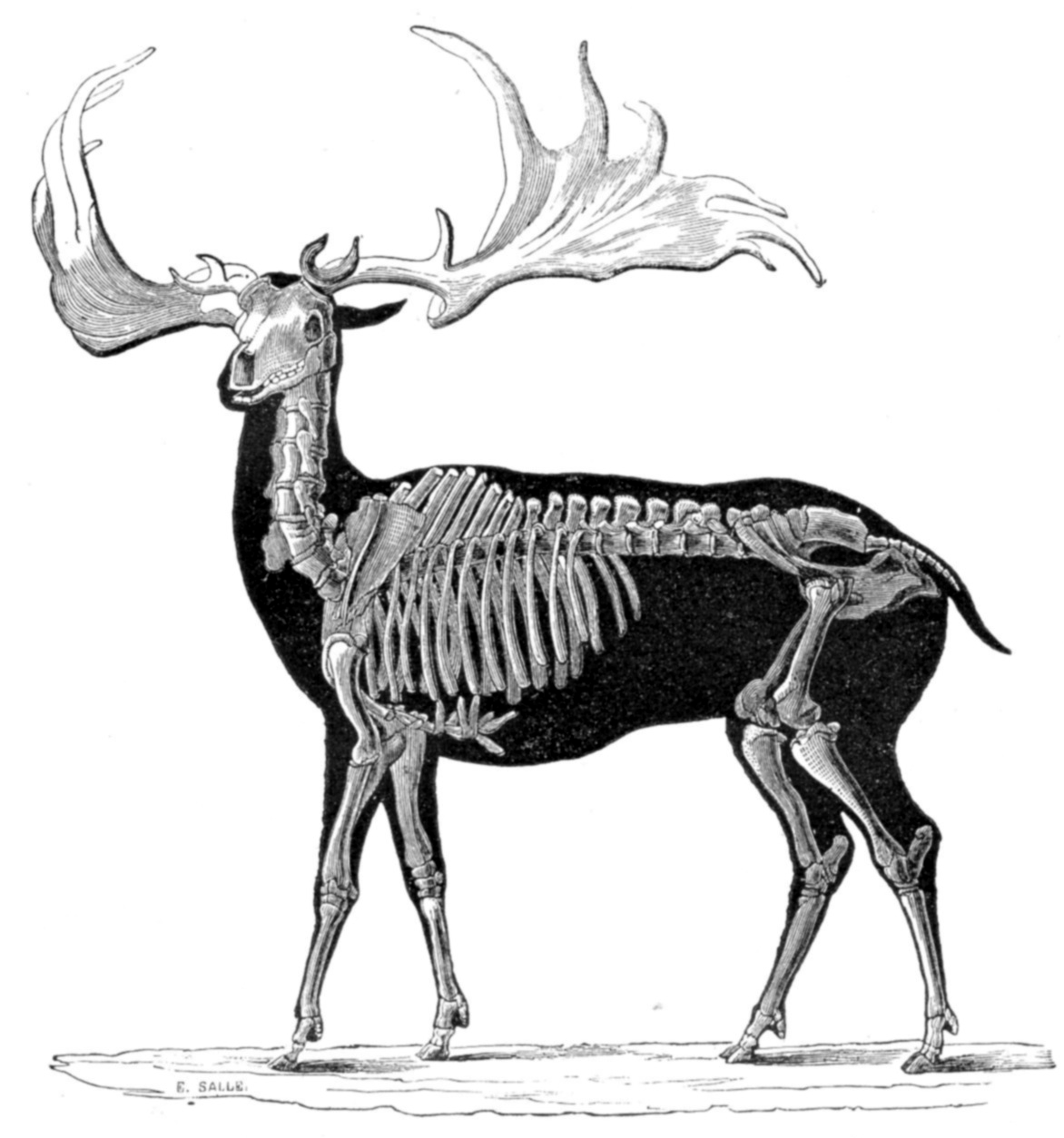
Skeletal reconstruction from 1856

The first scientific descriptions of the animal's remains were made by Irish physician Thomas Molyneux in 1695, who identified large antlers from Dardistown—which were apparently commonly unearthed in Ireland—as belonging to the elk (known as the moose in North America), concluding that it was once abundant on the island. It was first formally named as Alce gigantea by Johann Friedrich Blumenbach in his Handbuch der Naturgeschichte in 1799, with Alce being a variant of Alces, the Latin name for the elk. The original Blumenbach's description of Alce gigantea provides rather scant information about the species, specifying only that this particular kind of "fossil elk" comes from Ireland and is characterized by immense body size. According to Blumenbach, the distance between summits of giant deer antlers may attain 4.5 metres (14 feet). This particular feature mentioned by Blumenbach permitted to Roman Croitor to identify the type specimen of giant deer that was figured and described for the first time in Louthiana of Thomas Wright. The holotype of Megaloceros giganteus (Blumenbach, 1799) is a well-preserved male skull with exceptionally large antlers found in Dunleer environs (County Louth, Ireland). The type specimen of giant deer is currently exposed in Barmeath Castle where Thomas Wright first saw and described it.

French scientist Georges Cuvier documented in 1812 that the Irish elk did not belong to any species of mammal currently living, declaring it "le plus célèbre de tous les ruminans fossiles" (the most famous of all fossil ruminants). In 1827 Joshua Brookes, in a listing of his zoological collection, named the new genus Megaloceros (spelled Megalocerus in the earlier editions) in the following passage:

Amongst other Fossil Bones, there [are] ... two uncommonly fine Crania of the Megalocerus antiquorum (Mihi). (Irish), with unusually fine horns, (in part restored)

— Joshua Brookes, Brookesian Museum. The Museum of Joshua Brookes, Esq. Anatomical and Zoological Preparations, p 20.

The etymology being from Greek: μεγαλος megalos "great" + κερας keras "horn, antler". The type and only species named in the description being Megaloceros antiquorum, based on Irish remains now considered to belong to M. giganteus, making the former a junior synonym. The original description was considered by Adrian Lister in 1987 to be inadequate for a taxonomic definition. In 1828 Brookes published an expanded list in the form of a catalogue for an upcoming auction, which included the Latin phrase "Cornibus deciduis palmatis" (meaning "deciduous palmate antlers") as a description of the remains. The 1828 publication was approved by International Commission on Zoological Nomenclature (ICZN) in 1977 as an available publication for the basis of zoological nomenclature. Adrian Lister in 1987 judged that "the phase "Cornibus deciduis palmatis" constitutes a definition sufficient under the [International Code of Zoological Nomenclature] (article 12) to validate Megalocerus." The original spelling of Megalocerus was never used after its original publication.

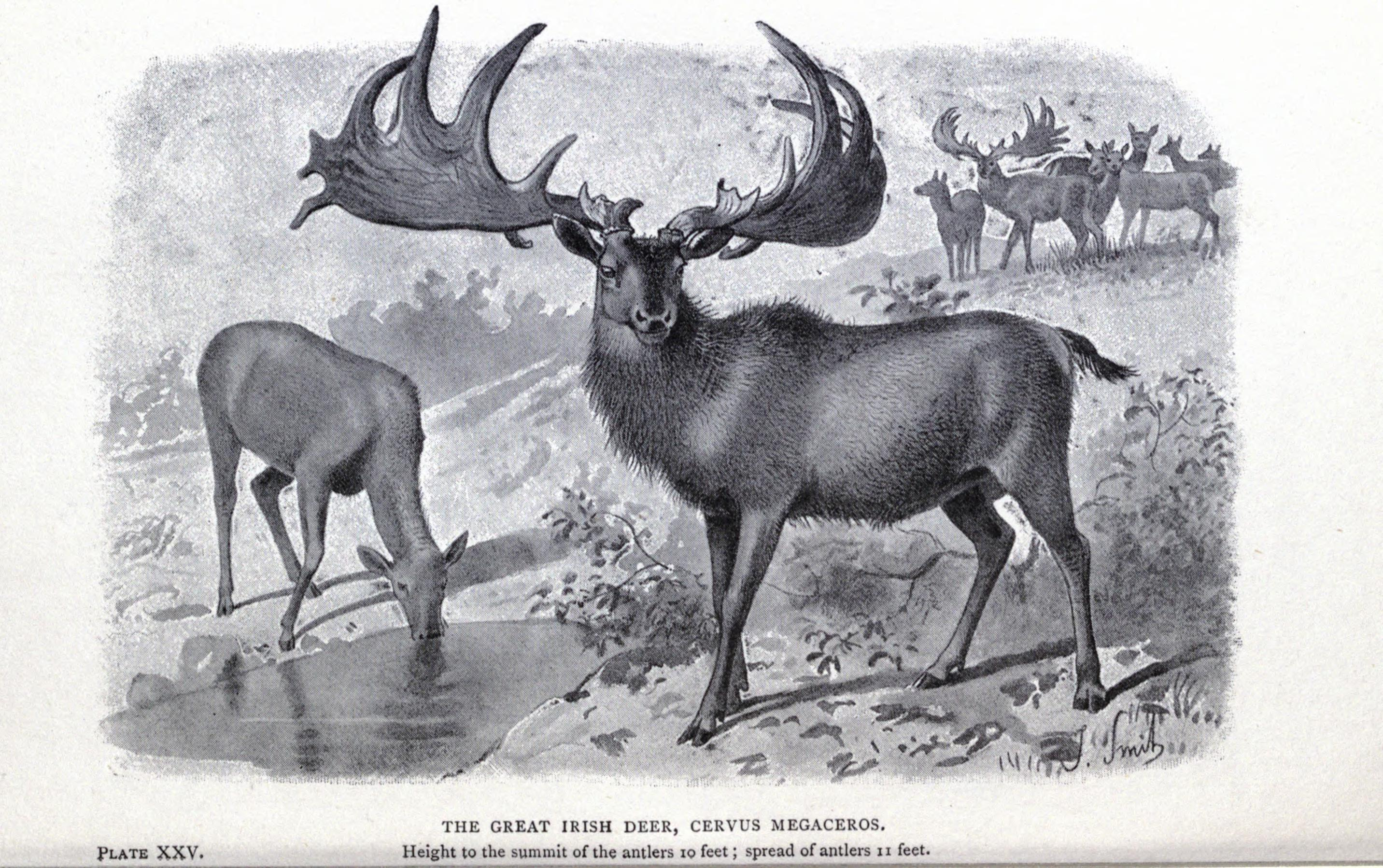
Outdated 1897 reconstruction of doe and stag Irish elk by Joseph Smit

In 1844, Richard Owen named another synonym of the Irish elk, including it within the newly named subgenus Megaceros, Cervus (Megaceros) hibernicus. This has been suggested to be derived from another junior synonym of the Irish elk described by J. Hart in 1825, Cervus megaceros. Despite being a junior synonym, Megaloceros remained in obscurity and Megaceros became the common genus name for the taxon. The combination "Megaceros giganteus" was in use by 1871. George Gaylord Simpson in 1945 revived the original Megaloceros name, which became progressively more widely used, until a taxonomic decision in 1989 by the ICZN confirmed the priority of Megaloceros over Megaceros, and Megaloceros to be the correct spelling.

Before the 20th century, the Irish elk, having evolved from smaller ancestors with smaller antlers, was taken as a prime example of orthogenesis (directed evolution), an evolutionary mechanism opposed to Darwinian evolution in which the successive species within the lineage become increasingly modified in a single undeviating direction, evolution proceeding in a straight line void of natural selection. Orthogenesis was claimed to have caused an evolutionary trajectory towards antlers that became larger and larger, eventually causing the species' extinction because the antlers grew to sizes which inhibited proper feeding habits and caused the animal to become trapped in tree branches. In the 1930s, orthogenesis was disputed by Darwinians led by Julian Huxley, who noted that antler size was not grossly large, and was proportional to body size. The currently favoured view is that sexual selection was the driving force behind the large antlers rather than orthogenesis or natural selection.

=== Evolution ===
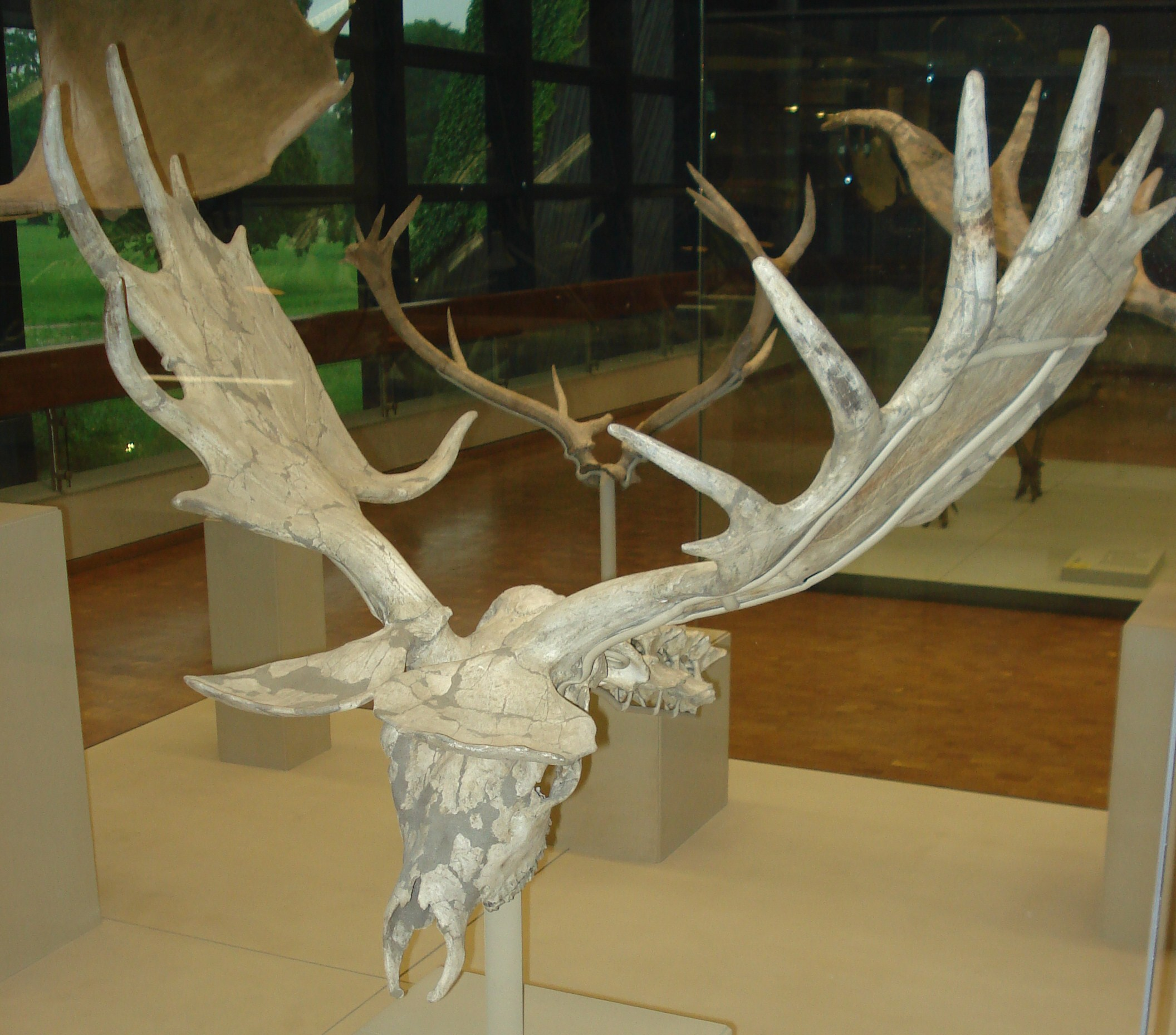
Skull of M. g. antecedens

M. giganteus belongs to the genus Megaloceros. Megaloceros has often been placed into the tribe Megacerini, alongside other genera often collectively referred to as "giant deer", like Sinomegaceros and Praemegaceros. The taxonomy of giant deer lacks consensus, with genus names used for species varying substantially between authors. The earliest possible record of the genus is a partial antler from the Early Pleistocene MN 17 (2.5–1.8 Ma) of Stavropol Krai in the North Caucasus of Russia, which were given the name of M. stavropolensis in 2016, however this species has been subsequently suggested to belong to Arvernoceros or Sinomegaceros. The oldest generally accepted records of the genus are from the late Early Pleistocene. Other species often considered to belong to Megaloceros include the reindeer sized M. savini, which is known from early Middle Pleistocene (~700,000–450,000 years ago) localities in England, France, Spain and Germany, and the more recently described species M. novocarthaginiensis, which is known from late Early Pleistocene (0.9–0.8 Ma) localities in Spain, and the small M. matritensis endemic to the Iberian peninsula during the late Middle Pleistocene (~400,000 to 250,000 years ago), which overlaps chronologically with the earliest M. giganteus records. Jan van der Made proposed M. novocarthaginiensis, M. savini and M. matritensis to be sequential chronospecies, due to shared morphological characteristics not found in M. giganteus and gradual transition of morphological characters through time. M. savini and related species have also been suggested to comprise the separate genus Praedama by other authors. While the M. savini/Praedama lineage is often suggested to be closely related to M. giganteus, most authors agree that this group of deer is unlikely to be directly ancestral to M. giganteus.

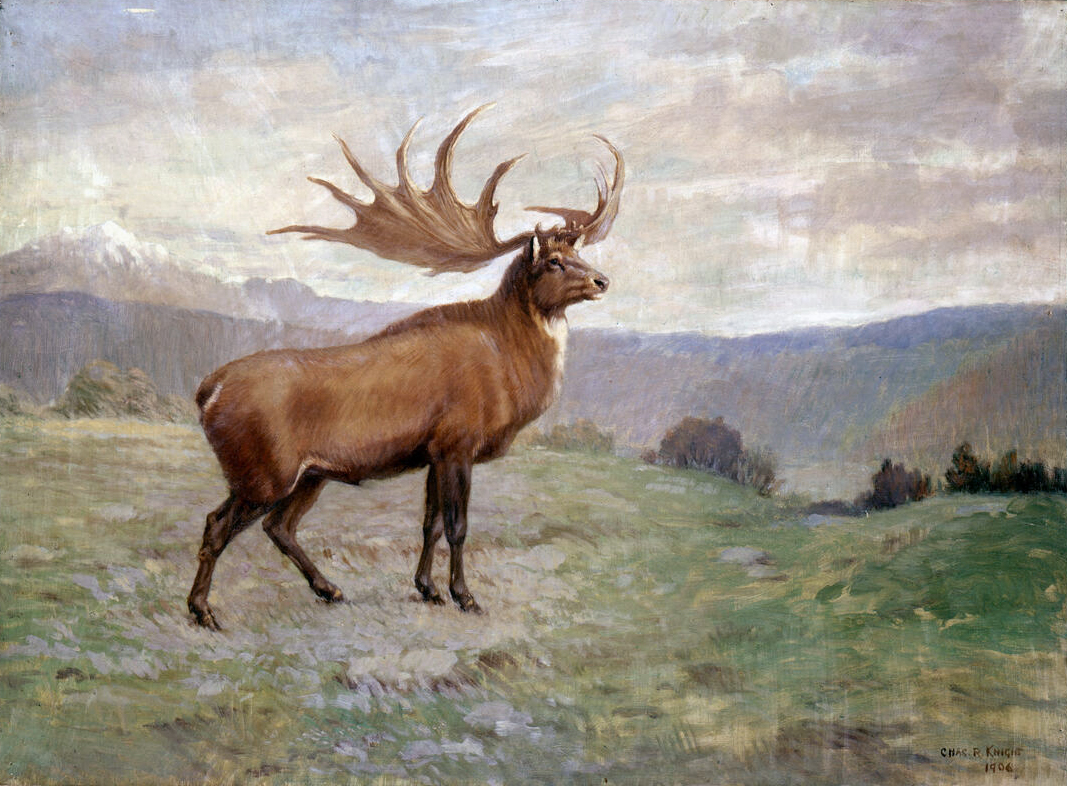
Outdated 1906 restoration by Charles R. Knight

The origin of M. giganteus remains unclear, and appears to lie outside Western Europe. Jan van der Made has suggested that remains of an indeterminate Megaloceros species from the late Early Pleistocene (~1.2 Ma) of Libakos in Greece are closer to M. giganteus than the M. novocarthaginiensis-savini-matritensis lineage due to the shared molarisation of the lower fourth premolar (P_{4}). Croitor has suggested that M. giganteus is closely related to what was originally described as Dama clactoniana mugharensis (which he proposes be named Megaloceros mugharensis) from the Middle Pleistocene of Tabun Cave in Israel, due to similarities in the antlers, molars and premolars. The earliest possible records of M. giganteus comes from Homersfield, England thought to be about 450,000 years ago—though the dating is uncertain. The oldest securely dated Middle Pleistocene records are those from Hoxne, England, which have been dated to Marine Isotope Stage 11 (424,000 to 374,000 years ago), other Middle Pleistocene early records include Steinheim an der Murr, Germany, (classified as M. g. antecedens) about 400,000–300,000 years ago and Swanscombe, England. Most remains of the Irish elk are known from the Late Pleistocene. A large proportion of the known remains of M. giganteus are from Ireland, which mostly date to the Allerød oscillation near the end of the Late Pleistocene around 13,000 years ago. Over 100 individuals have been found in Ballybetagh Bog near Dublin.

Some authors have proposed that Late Pleistocene M. giganteus should be divided into several subspecies including M. giganteus ruffii and M. giganteus giganteus, based primarily on differences in antler morphology.

It has been historically thought that, because both have palmated antlers, the Irish elk and fallow deer (Dama spp.) are closely related. This is supported by several other morphological similarities, including the lack of upper canines, proportionally long braincase and nasal bones, and proportionally short front portion of the skull. In 2005, two fragments of mitochondrial DNA (mtDNA) from the cytochrome b gene were extracted and sequenced from 4 antlers and a bone, the mtDNA found that the Irish elk was nested within Cervus, and were inside the clade containing living red deer (Cervus elaphus). Based on this, the authors suggested that the Irish elk and red deer interbred. However, another study from the same year in the journal Nature utilising both fragmentary mitochondrial DNA and morphological data found that the Irish elk was indeed most closely related to Dama. The close relationship with Dama was supported by another cytochrome b study in 2006, a 2015 study involving the full mitochondrial genome, and by a 2017 morphological analysis of the bony labyrinth. The 2006 and 2017 studies also directly suggest that the results of the 2005 cytochrome b paper were the result of DNA contamination.

Cladogram of Cervidae based on mitochondrial DNA:

- Cervidae
  - Capreolinae
    - - Hydropotes (water deer)
      - Capreolus (roe deer)
    - - Alces (moose)
      - - Rangifer (reindeer/caribou)
        - - Odocoileini (brocket deer, mule deer, white tailed deer, etc)
  - Cervinae
    - Muntiacini
      - Elaphodus (tufted deer)
      - Muntiacus (muntjacs)
    - Cervini
      - - Rucervus (Schomburgk's deer and barasingha)
        - Axis (chital, hog deer)
      - - - Dama (Fallow deer)
          - †Megaloceros giganteus (Irish elk) +†Sinomegaceros
        - - - Elaphurus (Père David's deer)
            - Panolia (Eld's deer)
          - - - Rusa alfredi (Visayan spotted deer)
              - Rusa marianna (Philippine deer)
            - - - Rusa timorensis (Javan rusa)
                - Rusa unicolor (Sambar deer)
              - Cervus (red deer, elk, sika deer)

A study of mitochondrial genomes from Sinomegaceros from the Late Pleistocene of East Asia found that the mitochondrial genomes of Megaloceros giganteus were nested within those of Sinomegaceros, suggesting that the two lineages interbred after their initial split. Cladogram of Megaloceros and Sinomegaceros mitochondrial genomes following Xiao et al. 2023.

- Dama
- Sinomegaceros+Megaloceros
  - Sinomegaceros pachyosteus (China)
  - - Megaloceros giganteus (Russia, Belgium)
    - - Sinomegaceros ordosianus (China, Russia)
      - - Sinomegaceros pachyosteus (China)
        - Megaloceros giganteus (Europe, Russia)

== Description ==
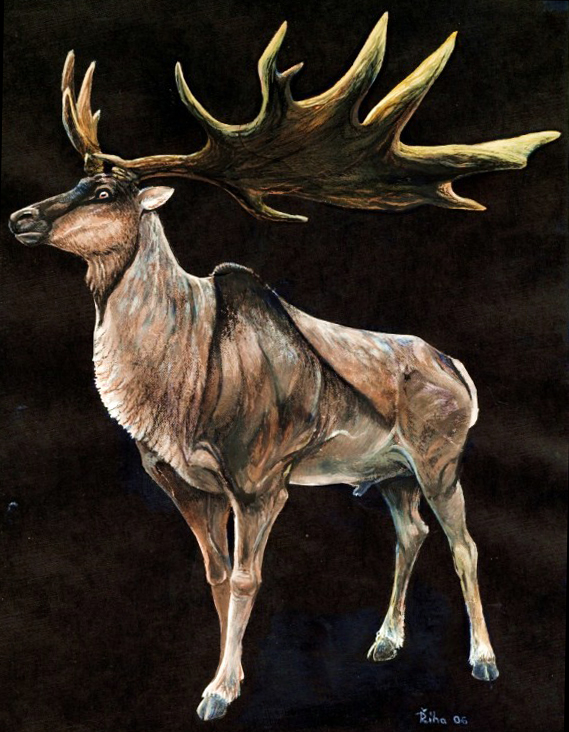
Life restoration

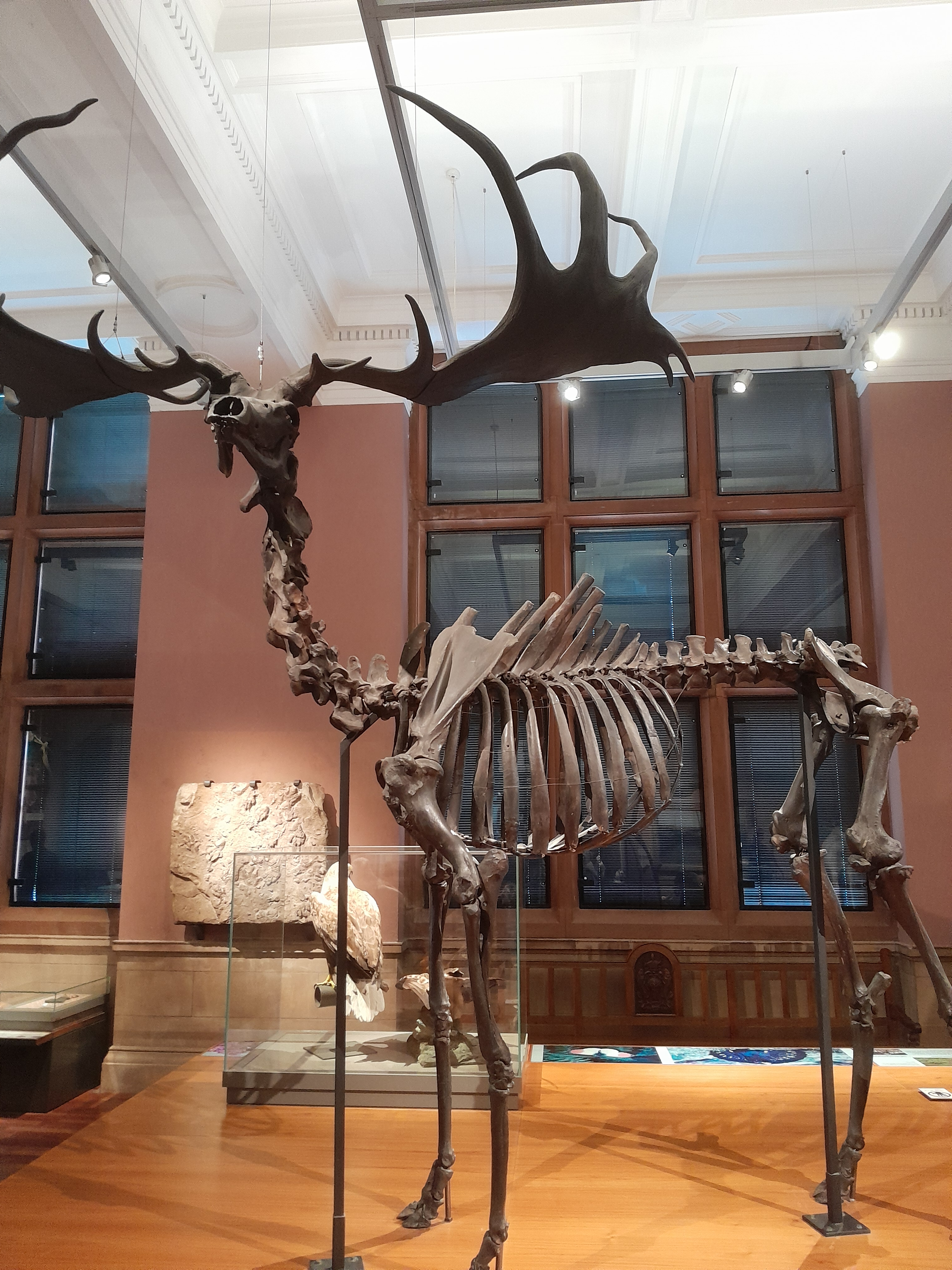
Skeleton of Irish elk exhibited in Kelvingrove Art Gallery and Museum in Glasgow

The Irish elk stood about 2 m (6 ft 7 in) tall at the shoulders, and had large palmate (flat and broad) antlers, the largest of any known deer, with the broadest antlers, such as those on holotype Barmeath Castle skull, reaching 4.26 m (14.0 ft) from tip to tip, with the heaviest antlers reaching 40 kg (88 lb) in weight. The antlers are considerably larger than those of living moose, being on average over twice the volume of moose antlers. The shape and span of the antlers varied significantly over time and space, likely reflecting some populations adaptation to forested environments.

For body size, at about 450–600 kg (990–1,320 lb) and up to 700 kg (1,540 lb) or more, the Irish elk was the heaviest known cervine ("Old World deer"); and tied with the extant Alaska moose (Alces alces gigas) as the third largest known deer, after the extinct Cervalces latifrons and Cervalces scotti. Compared to Alces, Irish elk appear to have had a more robust skeleton, with older and more mature Alces skeletons bearing some resemblance to those of prime Irish elk, and younger Irish elk resembling prime Alces. Likely due to different social structures, the Irish elk exhibits more marked sexual dimorphism than Alces, with Irish elk bucks being notably larger than does. In total, Irish elk bucks may have ranged from 450–700 kg (990–1,540 lb), with an average of 575 kg (1,268 lb), and does may have been relatively large, about 80% of buck size, or 460 kg (1,010 lb) on average. The distinguishing characters of M. giganteus include concave frontals, proportionally long braincase, proportionally short front section of the skull (orbitofrontal region), alongside the absence of upper canines and the molarisation of the lower fourth premolar (P_{4}). The skull and mandible of the Irish elk exhibit substantial thickening (pachyostosis), with the early and complete obliteration of cranial sutures.

Based on Upper Palaeolithic cave paintings, the Irish elk seems to have had overall light colouration, with a dark stripe running along the back, a stripe on either side from shoulder to haunch, a dark collar on the throat and a chinstrap, and a dark hump on the withers (between the shoulder blades). In 1989, American palaeontologist Dale Guthrie suggested that, like bison, the hump allowed a higher hinging action of the front legs to increase stride length while running. Valerius Geist suggested that the hump may have also been used to store fat. Localising fat rather than evenly distributing it may have prevented overheating while running or in rut during the summer.

== Habitat ==
The Irish elk had a far-reaching range, extending from the Atlantic Ocean in the West to Lake Baikal in the East. Irish elk do not appear have extended northward onto the open mammoth steppe in Siberia, rather keeping to the boreal steppe-woodland environments, which consisted of scattered spruce and pine, as well as low-lying herbs and shrubs including grasses, sedges, Ephedra, Artemisia and Chenopodiaceae. The species appears to have had a degree of ecological plasticity, as during interglacial periods prior to the Holocene, the species was present in temperate forested environments in Europe. During these times, the species generally had less broad antlers than during glacial periods, likely as an adaptation to moving through forested environments.

== Palaeobiology ==
=== Physiology ===
Drawing of cave art from Grotte de Cougnac, France showing coloured shoulder hump and lines. c. 25,000 to 19,000 years old

In 1998, Canadian biologist Valerius Geist hypothesised that the Irish elk was cursorial (adapted for running and stamina). He noted that the Irish elk physically resembled reindeer. The body proportions of the Irish elk are similar to those of the cursorial addax, oryx, and saiga antelope. These include the relatively short legs, the long front legs nearly as long as the hind legs, and a robust cylindrical body. Cursorial saiga, gnus, and reindeer have a top speed of over 80 km/h (50 mph), and can maintain high speeds for up to 15 minutes.

=== Reproduction ===
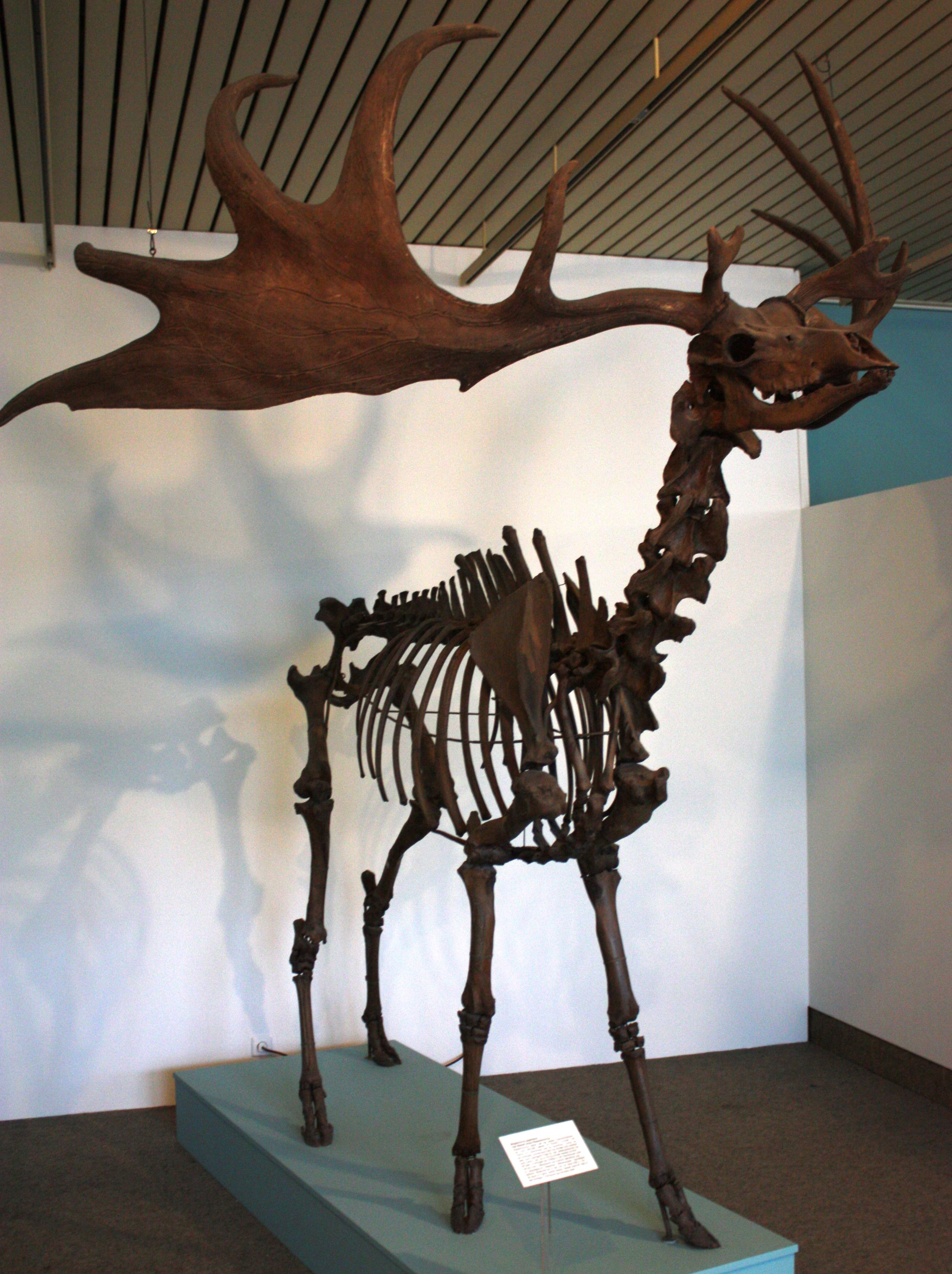
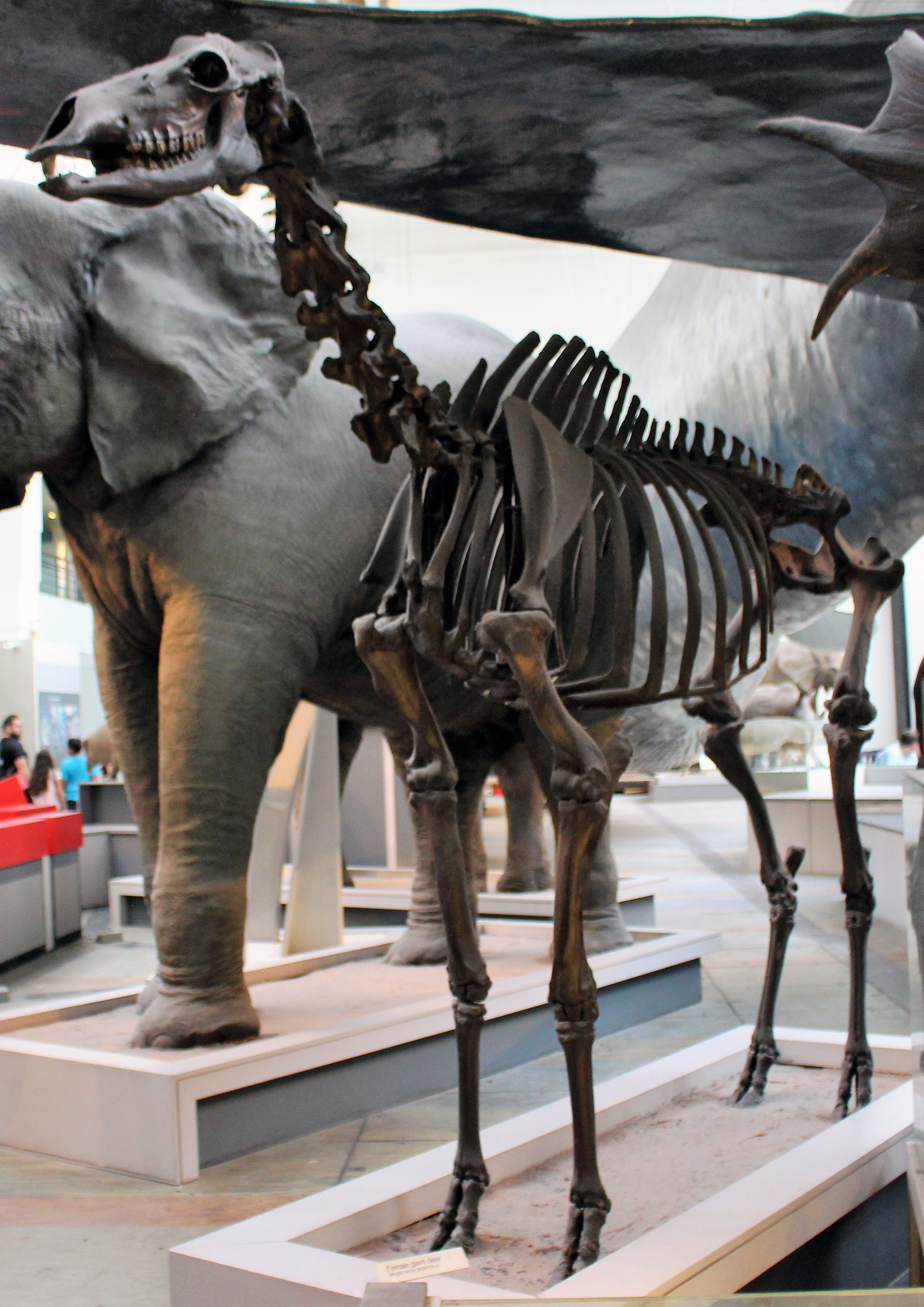
Mounted skeletons of a buck (left) and a doe

At Ballybetagh Bog, over 100 Irish elk individuals were found, all small antlered bucks. This indicates that bucks and does segregated during at least winter and spring. Many modern deer species do this partly because males and females have different nutritional requirements and need to consume different types of plants. Segregation would also imply a polygynous society, with stags fighting for control over harems during rut. Because most of the individuals found were juvenile or geriatric and were likely suffering from malnutrition, they probably died from winterkill. Most Irish elk specimens known may have died from winterkill, and winterkill is the highest source of mortality among many modern deer species. Bucks generally suffer higher mortality rates because they eat little during the autumn rut. For rut, a lean stag normally 575 kg (1,268 lb) may have fattened up to 690 kg (1,520 lb), and would burn through the extra fat over the next month.

Assuming a similar response to starvation as red deer, a large, healthy Irish elk stag with 40 kg (88 lb) antlers would have had 20-to-28 kg (44-to-62 lb) antlers under poor conditions; and an average sized Irish elk stag with 35 kg (77 lb) antlers would have had 18 to 25 kg (40 to 55 lb) antlers under poorer conditions, similar sizes to the moose. A similar change in a typical Irish elk population with prime stags having 35 kg (77 lb) antlers would result in antler weights of 13 kg (29 lb) or less in worsening climatic conditions. This is within the range of present-day wapiti/red deer (Cervus spp.) antler weights. Irish elk antlers vary widely in form depending upon the habitat, such as a compact, upright shape in closed forest environments. Irish elk likely shed their antlers and re-grew a new pair during mating season. Antlers generally require high amounts of calcium and phosphate, especially those for stags which have larger structures, and the massive antlers of Irish elk may have required much greater quantities. Stags typically meet these requirements in part from their bones, suffering from a condition similar to osteoporosis while the antlers are growing, and replenishing them from food plants after the antlers have grown in or reclaiming nutrients from shed antlers.

The large antlers have generally been explained as being used for male-male battle during mating season. They may have also been used for display, to attract females and assert dominance against rival males. A finite element analysis of the antlers suggested that during fighting, the antlers were likely to interlock around the middle tine, the high stress when interlocking on the distal tine suggests that the fighting was likely more constrained and predictable than among extant deer, likely involving twisting motions, as is known in extant deer with palmated antlers.

In deer, gestation time generally increases with body size. A 460 kg (1,010 lb) doe may have had a gestation period of about 274 days. Based on this and patterns seen in modern deer, last year's antlers in Irish elk bucks were potentially shed in early March, peak antler growth in early June, completion by mid-July, shedding velvet (a layer of blood vessels on the antlers in-use while growing them) by late July, and the height of rut falling on the second week of August. Geist, believing the Irish elk to have been a cursorial animal, concluded that a doe would have to have produced nutrient-rich milk so that her calf would have enough energy and stamina to keep up with the herd.

=== Diet and life history ===
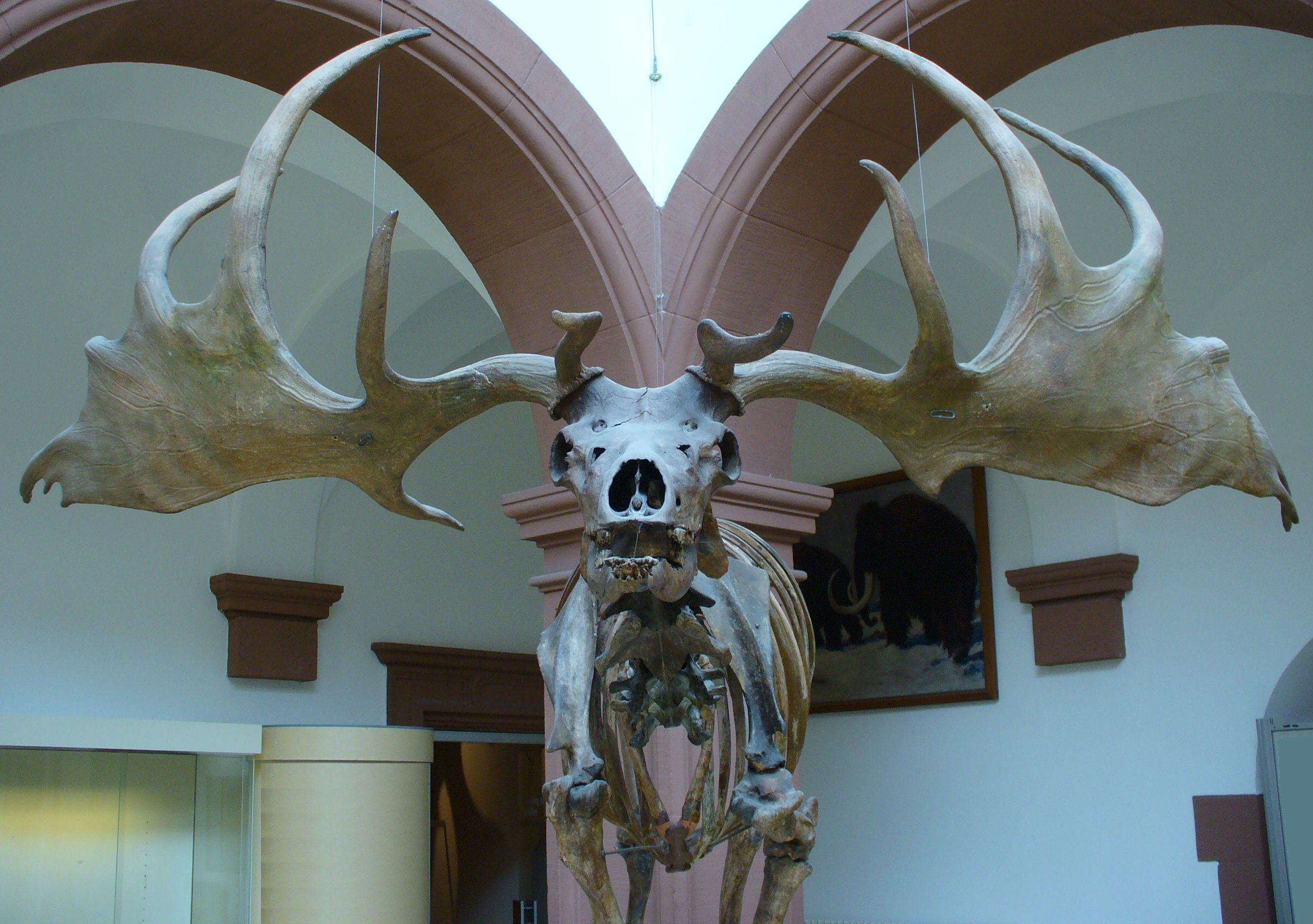
Skull in front view

The mesodont (meaning neither high (hypsodont) or low (brachydont) crowned) condition of the teeth suggests that the species was a mixed feeder, being able to both browse and graze. Pollen remains from teeth found in the North Sea around 43,000 years old were found to be dominated by Artemisia and other Asteraceae, with minor Plantago, Helianthemum, Plumbaginaceae and willow (Salix). Another earlier specimen from the Netherlands (dating to the Eemian interglacial or early in the Last Glacial Period) was found to have pollen of Apiaceae, including cow parsley (Anthriscus sylvestris), cow parsnip/hogweed (Heracleum), water pennywort (Hydrocotyle), Asteraeceae, Filipendula, Symphytum and grass embedded with its teeth. Bioapatite δ^{13}C and δ^{18}O analysis of the terminal Pleistocene Irish population suggests a grass and forb based diet, supplemented by browsing during stressed periods. Dental wear patterns of specimens from the late Middle and Late Pleistocene of Britain suggest a diet tending towards mixed feeding and grazing, but with a wide range including leaf browsing. Paired dental mesowear and microwear of Irish elk teeth from the Harz Mountains and southern Germany reveal very high degrees of dietary variation, ranging from folivorous browsing to grass-dominated mixed feeding. This pattern likely reflects seasonal variation, as the microwear patterns which reflect the last days to weeks of an animal's diet indicated browsing while the longer lasting mesowear signal evidenced mixed feeding, and highlights the Irish elk's extreme dietary flexibility. Irish elk microwear values in the Carpathian Basin indicate mixed feeding diets, but mesowear values of these specimens, reflecting a longer term dietary signal, show that an individual Irish elk could occupy any dietary category from browser to grazer, highlighting the species' adaptability. Comparisons of bone collagen δ^{15}N between Irish elk and red deer at the Middle Pleistocene site of Schöningen in Germany suggest that grasses were a more important component of the former's diet relative to the latter. δ^{13}C measurements of Irish elk from Abri du Maras may also suggest that they seasonally fed on lichens and mosses, as reindeer do, although it is unclear if their rumen microbiology was adapted for lichen consumption like that of reindeer.

Examination of histological sections of their long bones suggests that the species has relatively rapid growth rates, reaching skeletal maturity by around 6 years of age. Analysis of the cementum layers of their teeth suggests that Irish elk reached a maximum lifespan of at least 19 years, comparable to moose.

Based on the dietary requirements of red deer, a 675 kg (1,488 lb) lean Irish elk stag would have needed to consume 39.7 kg (88 lb) of fresh forage daily. Assuming antler growth occurred over a span of 120 days, a stag would have required 1,372 g (3 lb) of protein daily, as well as access to nutrient- and mineral-dense forage starting about a month before antlers began sprouting and continuing until they had fully grown. Such forage is not very common, and stags perhaps sought after aquatic plants in lakes. After antler growing, stags could probably satisfy their nutritional requirements in productive sedge lands bordered by willow and birch forests.

Gnaw marks on found on Irish elk bones indicates that they were preyed on or scavenged by cave hyenas.

== Relationship with early humans ==
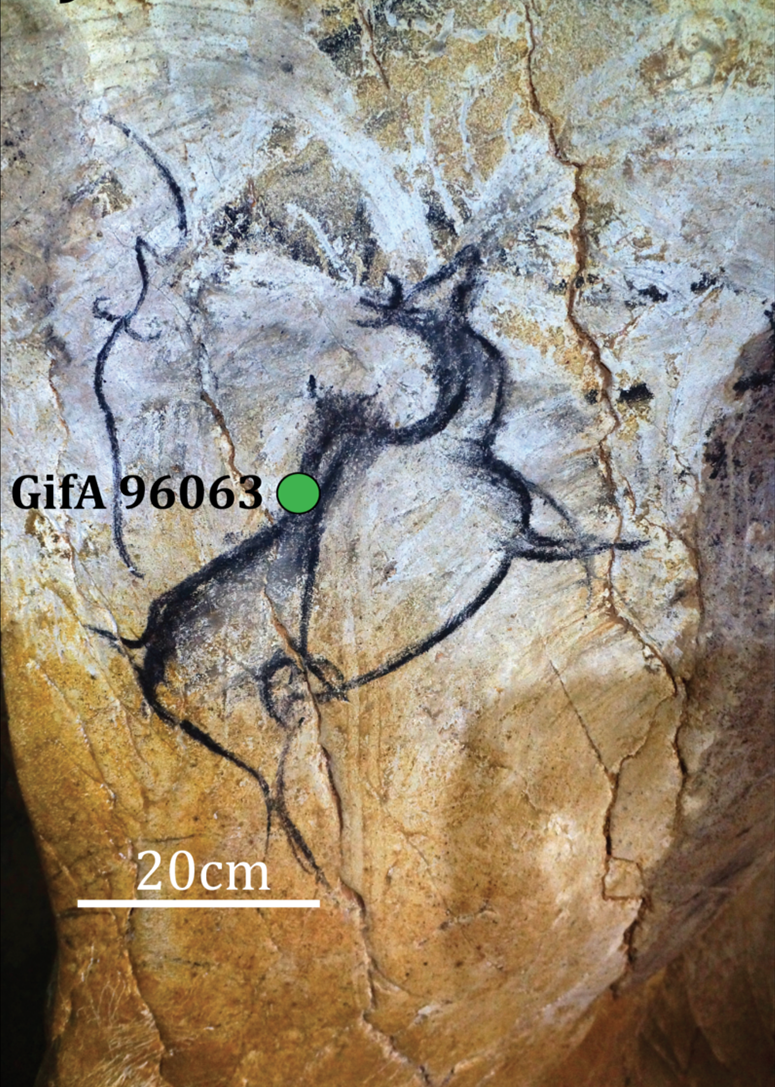
36,000-year-old Irish elk cave painting at Chauvet Cave, France (dot indicates ^{14}C sample)

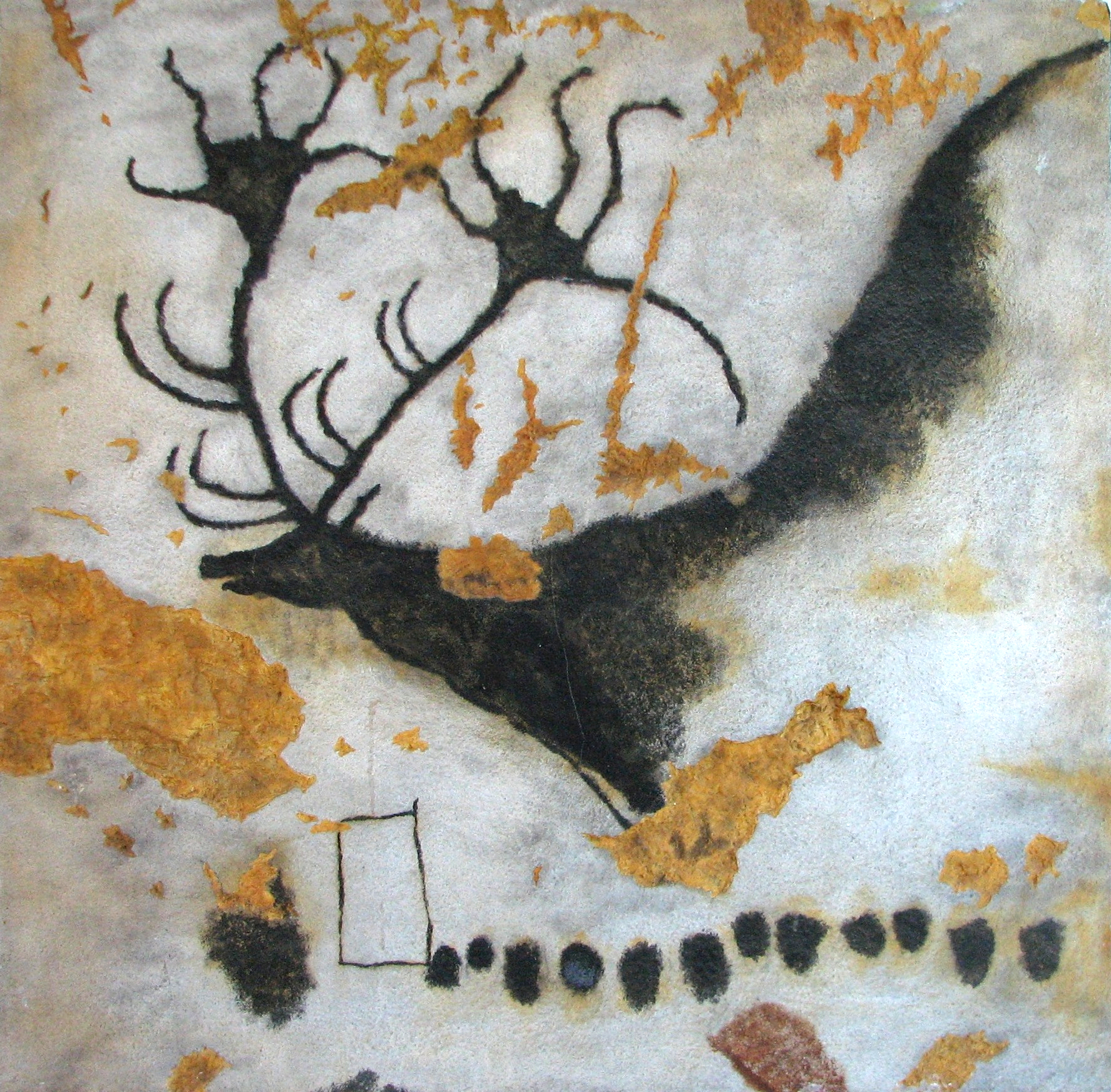
Replica of a cave painting from Lascaux, c. 15,000 BC

At a number of Middle Paleolithic sites, remains of M. giganteus have been found with cut marks indicating butchery by Neanderthals. These include Bolomor Cave in Spain, dating to around 180,000 years ago, and De Nadale Cave and Riparo del Broion in northern Italy, dating to 71–69,000 and 50–44,000 years ago, respectively. Other sites probably resulting from exploitation of Irish elk by Neanderthals include Abri du Maras in southeast France, dating to 55–40,000 years ago. A mandible from Ofatinţi, Moldova dating to either the Eemian or the early Late Pleistocene, has been noted for having "tool-made notches on its lateral side".

A handful of Irish elk depictions are known from the art of the Upper Paleolithic in Europe. However, these are much less abundant than the common red deer and reindeer depictions. Only a handful of examples of modern human interaction are known. Several M. giganteus bones from the Chatelperronian levels of the Labeko Koba site in Spain are noted for bearing puncture marks, which have been interpreted as anthropogenic. A terminal Pleistocene (13,710-13,215 cal BP) skull from Lüdersdorf, Germany is noted to have had the antler and facial part of the skull deliberately removed. A calcaneum from an associated lower hind limb from the early Holocene site of Sosnovy Tushamsky in Siberia is noted to have "two short and deep traces of cutting blows", which are interpreted as "clear evidence of butchery". The use of shed antler bases is also known, at the terminal Pleistocene (Allerød) Endingen VI site in Germany, a shed antler base appears to have been used in a way analogous to a lithic core to produce "blanks" for the manufacture of barbed projectile tips. A ring-like mark on a shed antler beam from the similarly aged Paderborn site in Germany has been suggested to be anthropogenic.

== Extinction ==
Outside of the Irish Late Pleistocene, remains of Irish elk are uncommon, suggesting that they were usually rare in the areas where they did occur.

Historically, its extinction has been attributed to the encumbering size of the antlers, a "maladaptation" making fleeing through forests especially difficult for males while being chased by human hunters, or being too taxing nutritionally when the vegetation makeup shifted. In these scenarios, sexual selection by does for stags with large antlers would have contributed to decline. However, antler size decreased through the Late Pleistocene and into the Holocene, and so may not have been the primary cause of extinction. A reduction in forest density in the Late Pleistocene and a lack of sufficient high-quality forage is associated with a decrease in body and antler size. Such resource constriction may have cut female fertility rates in half. Human hunting may have forced Irish elk into suboptimal feeding grounds. Irish elk populations may have been subject to selection pressure such as predation and sexual selection that forced them to maintain a large body size even if a smaller body size may have been more optimal for given environmental conditions.

The distribution of M. giganteus is thought to have been strongly controlled by climatic conditions. The range of the Irish elk appears to have collapsed during the Last Glacial Maximum (LGM), with few remains known between 27,500 and 14,600 years ago, and none between 23,300 and 17,500 years ago. Known remains substantially increase during the latest Pleistocene Bølling–Allerød Interstadial, where it appears to have re-colonized northern Europe, with abundant remains in the UK, Ireland, and Denmark, though its range contracted again during the following Younger Dryas, disappearing from northern Europe by the end of the period. A 2021 study found that M. giganteus saw a progressive decline in mitochondrial genome diversity beginning around 50,000 years ago, which accelerated during the LGM.

By the early Holocene, the range of the species had been dramatically reduced, with the youngest records in the eastern part of its range near Lake Baikal dating to around 10,700–10,400 years Before Present (BP), surviving latest in the central part of its range within European Russia and Western Siberia. It is suggested that extinction was contributed to by further climatic changes transforming preferred open habitat into uninhabitable dense forest. The final dates of Irish elk in western Russia roughly coincide with the earliest, scattered presence of Neolithic people in the region. The final demise may have been caused by several factors both on a continental and regional scale, including climate change and hunting. The youngest dates in this region from Kamyshlov in Western Siberia and Maloarkhangelsk, Oryol Oblast In European Russia date to around 7,700-7,600 years ago, and it is suggested that it likely became extinct shortly after this time. Lister and Stewart concluded in a study of the extinction of the Irish elk that "it seems clear that environmental factors, cumulatively over thousands of years, reduced giant deer populations to a highly vulnerable state. In this situation, even relatively low-level hunting by small human populations could have contributed to its extinction."

== Modern significance ==
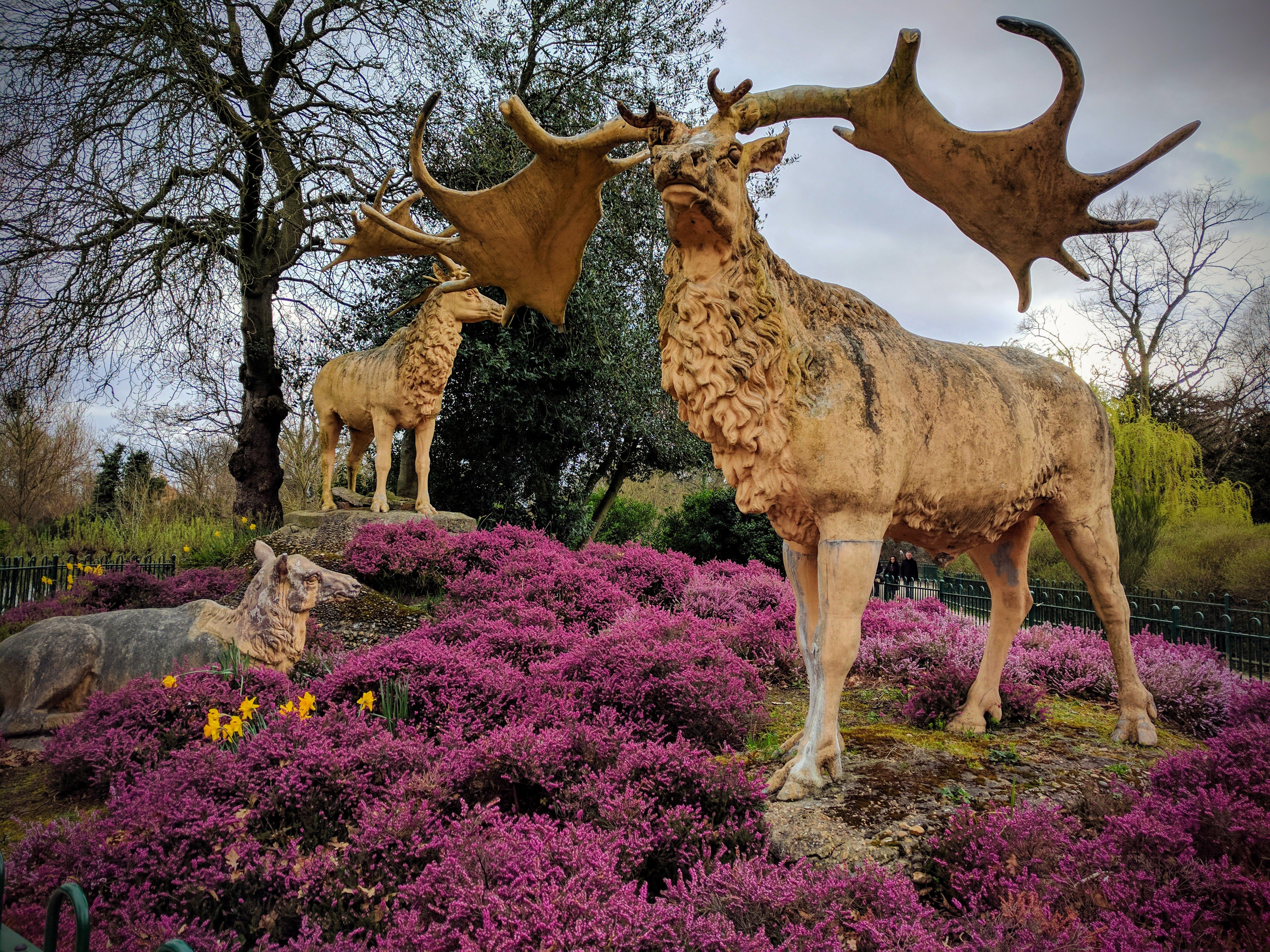
Sculptures in Crystal Palace

Due to the abundance of Irish elk remains in Ireland, a thriving trade in their bones existed there during the 19th century to supply museums and collectors. Skeletons and skulls with attached antlers were also prized ornaments in aristocratic homes. The remains of Irish elk were of high value: "In 1865, full skeletons might fetch £30, while particularly good heads with antlers could cost £15." £15 was more than 30 weeks' wages for a low skilled worker at the time. Indeed Leeds Philosophical and Literary Society bought a full skeleton in 1847, from Glennon's in Dublin, for £38. This specimen, discovered at Lough Gur near Limerick, is still on display at Leeds City Museum.

In the Coat of arms of Northern Ireland issued in 1924 (with supporters added the next year) an Irish elk is the sinister supporter.

The 2022 album by Irish band Fontaines D.C. Skinty Fia (translating directly to "The Damnation of the Deer") features the Elk on the front cover, and alludes to it throughout the album.
