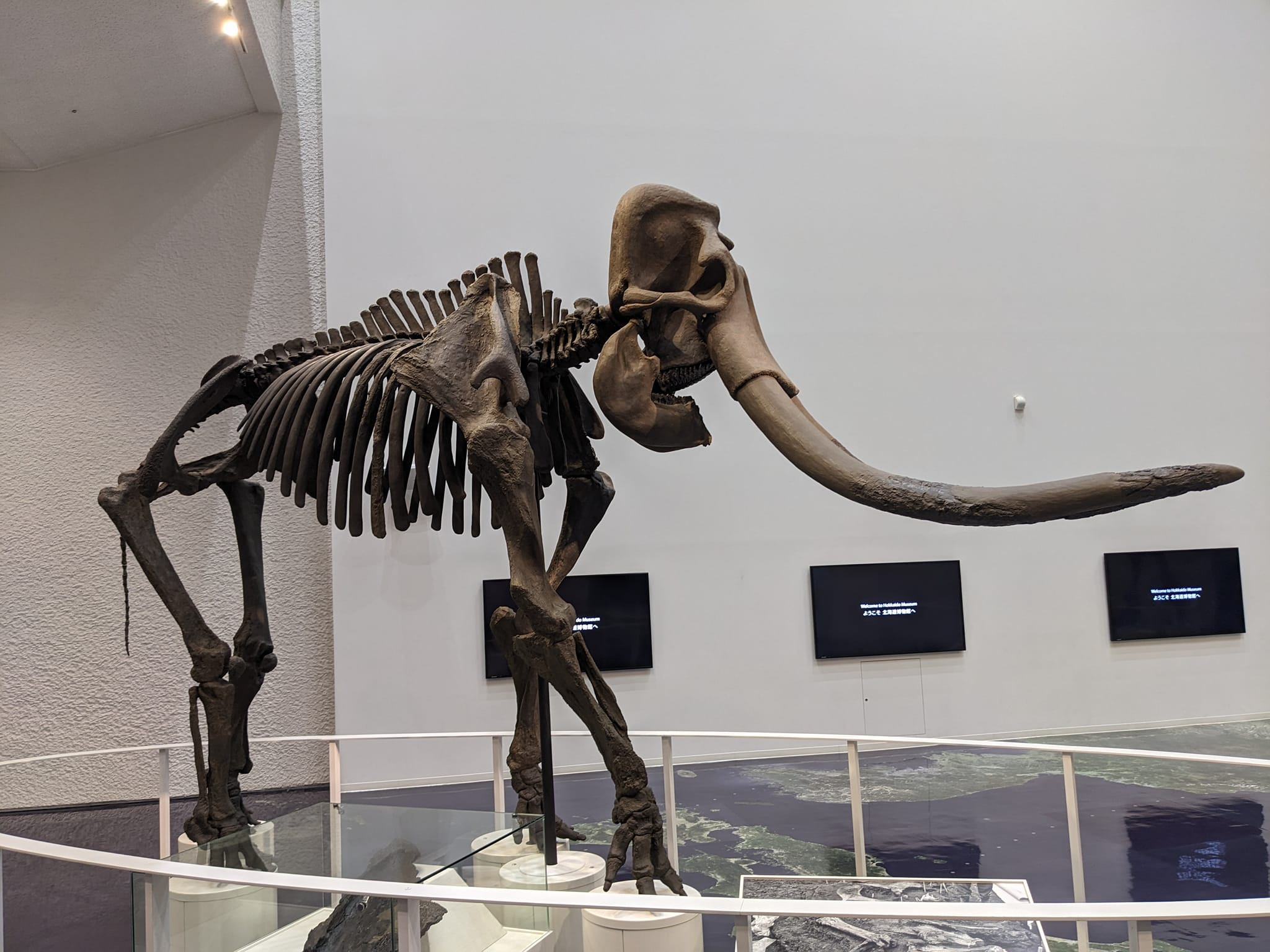
- Mounted skeleton of Palaeoloxodon naumanni at Hokkaido Museum

Scientific classification
- Kingdom: Animalia
- Phylum: Chordata
- Class: Mammalia
- Infraclass: Placentalia
- Order: Proboscidea
- Family: Elephantidae
- Genus: †Palaeoloxodon
- Species: †P. naumanni

Binomial name
- †Palaeoloxodon naumanni (Makiyama, 1924)

Synonyms
- Elephas namadicus naumannni Makiyama, 1924

= Palaeoloxodon naumanni =

Palaeoloxodon naumanni Temporal range: Middle to Late Pleistocene 0.33–0.024 Ma

Extinct species of elephant native to Japan

Palaeoloxodon naumanni is an extinct species of elephant belonging to the genus Palaeoloxodon that was native to the Japanese archipelago during the Middle to Late Pleistocene. It is named after the German geologist Heinrich Edmund Naumann who first described remains of the species in the late 19th century, with the species sometimes being called Naumann's elephant. Fossils attributed to P. naumanni are also known from China, though the status of these specimens is unresolved, and some authors regard them as belonging to separate species.

== Description ==
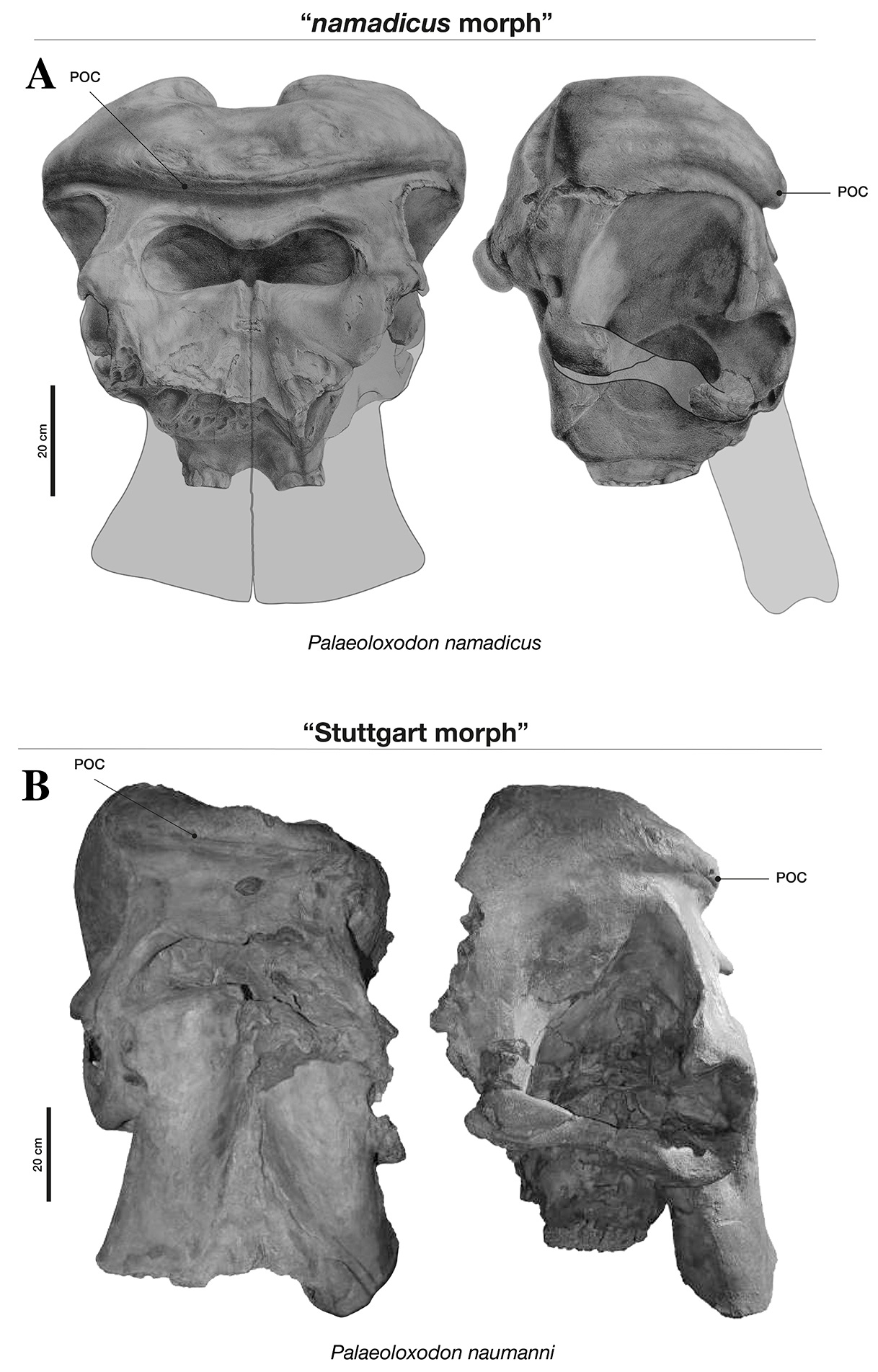
Comparison of the skull of Palaeoloxodon naumanni (below), with the related Palaeoloxodon namadicus from the Indian subcontinent (top), showing differences in the shape of the skull including the parietal-occipital crest (labeled POC)

Palaeoloxodon naumanni, like other members of the genus Palaeoloxodon had a growth of bone, dubbed the parietal-occipital crest (POC) on the top of the skull to anchor the splenius and possibly other muscles to support the head. In comparison to many Eurasian species of Palaeoloxodon, the POC was only weakly developed (though more pronounced in males than in females) and does not come near the nasal opening, comparable to the condition in the African Palaeoloxodon recki. This weakly developed morphology, (the so-called "Stuttgart morph") of the POC appears to have been the ancestral condition in Palaeoloxodon. The frons (forehead region) of the skull is wide and proportionally flat, with the frontal being high. The premaxillae bones (which contain the tusks) are relatively short in comparison to other Palaeoloxodon species. The stylohyoid bone shows the development of a distinctive depression called the "angulus", which appears to be a unique autapomorphy (distinctive characteristic) of this species.

The species like other elephants was sexually dimorphic, with P. naumanni having a reconstructed shoulder height of 2.4–2.8 metres (7.9–9.2 ft), for males and around 2 metres (6.6 ft) for females. This is relatively small in comparison to other (non-dwarf) Palaeoloxodon species. The shoulders represent the highest position of the back. The limb bones are generally robust, and the deltoid muscle ridge on the humerus is well developed. The tusks were upward curving and somewhat twisted in males, but were relatively straight and untwisted in females, and reached a maximum length of about 2.2–2.4 metres (7.2–7.9 ft) and a maximum diameter of 20 centimetres (7.9 in).

== Discovery and nomenclature ==
In 1860, the first fossil was found at Yokosuka and the bottom of the Seto Inland Sea, Japan. German geologist Heinrich Edmund Naumann researched and reported these fossils in “Ueber japanische Elephanten der Vorzeit” (1882). Naumann classified the fossil as belonging to the species Elephas namadicus (now Palaeoloxodon namadicus), which has been originally named for remains found in the Indian subcontinent. In 1924, Jiro Makiyama researched fossils found in Hamamatsu, Shizuoka Prefecture, and, in his “Notes on a Fossil Elephant from Sahamma, Totomi”, reported that the elephant was a previously unidentified subspecies, and designated the fossil Elephas namadicus naumannni. Tadao Kamei identified Elephas namadicus naumanni as a new species, called Palaeoloxodon naumanni, from fossils found at Lake Nojiri. In the 1920s and 1930s several other Palaeoloxodon species and subspecies were identified in Japan, including Palaeoloxodon tokunagai, P. namadicus namad, P. namadicus yabei, P. aomoriensis and P. yokohamanus. These were all later synonymised with P. naumanni during the 1970s. Historically, some Japanese researchers continued to place the species in the genus Elephas (which contains the living Asian elephant).

Remains from mainland China have also been attributed to this species by some authors. However, other authors attribute the Chinese remains, which are considerably larger than Japanese P. naumanni, to the separate species P. huaihoensis, originally named as a subspecies of P. naumanni, or otherwise consider them indeterminate within the genus Palaeoloxodon. Recent authors have suggested that Chinese Palaeoloxodon remains may be attributable to the largely European straight-tusked elephant (Palaeoloxodon antiquus).

== Distribution and ecology ==
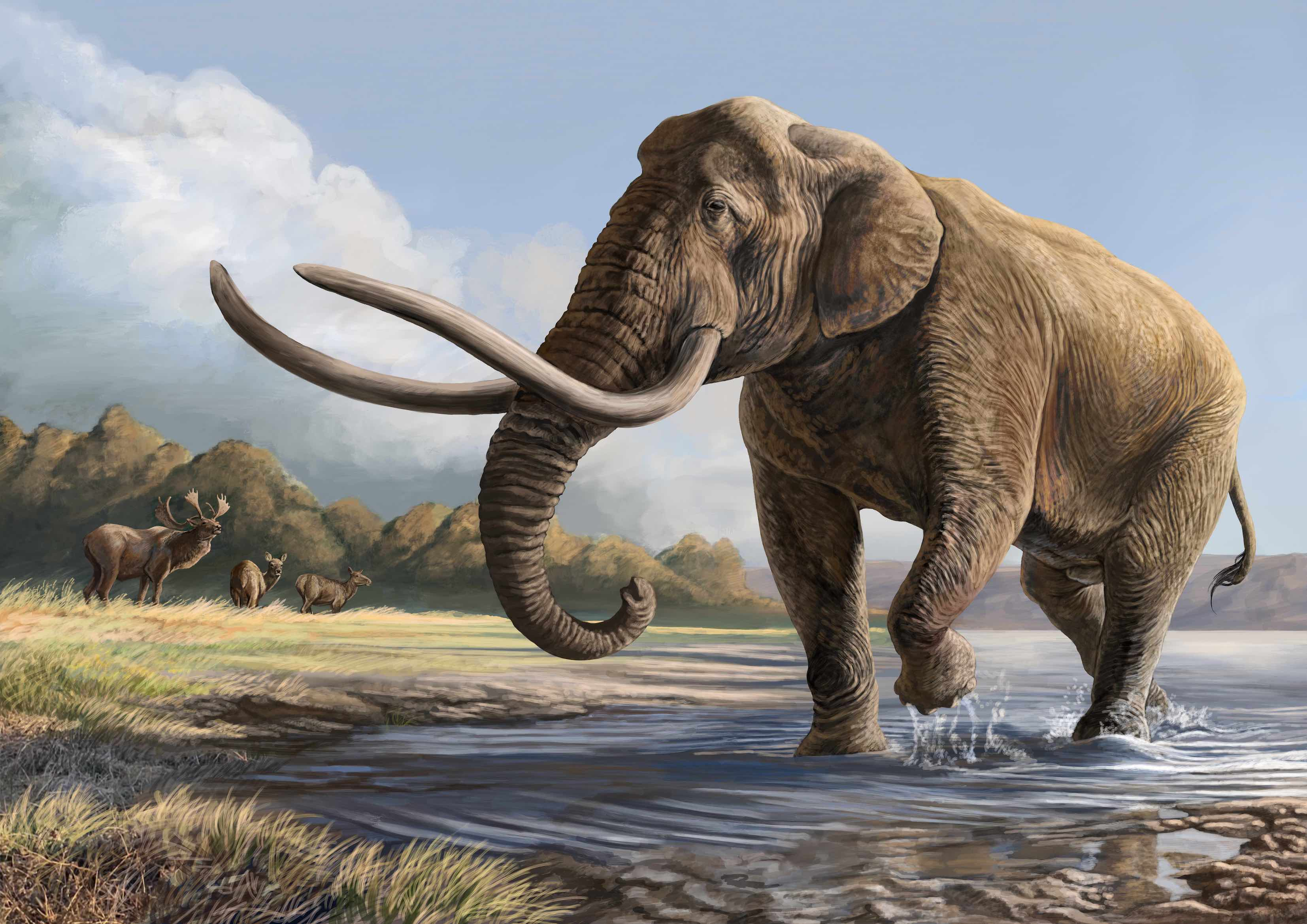
Life restoration of Palaeoloxodon naumanni in a Pleistocene Japanese landscape, with the giant deer Sinomegaceros yabei in the background left. Artwork by Kohei Futaka

P. naumanni belongs to an-early diverging mitochondrial DNA clade within Palaeoloxodon, suggesting it diverged early from other Eurasian Palaeoloxodon species, with its mitochondrial DNA suggesting that like other Eurasian Palaeoloxodon species, it had some ancestry from African forest elephants inherited as a result of hybridization in their African ancestor Palaeoloxodon recki. The oldest known date for the species is around 330,000 years ago, when it seems to have replaced the earlier proboscidean Stegodon orientalis, which had arrived in Japan from mainland East Asia several hundred thousand years earlier. P. naumanni is known from hundreds of localities across the Japanese archipelago, ranging from southern Kyushu, northwards to northern Honshu and to Hokkaido during warmer intervals, while it was replaced in Hokkaido by the woolly mammoth during cooler intervals. It is suggested that it preferred temperate forested habitats, including deciduous broad-leaved trees and conifers, though isotopic analysis suggests that some populations likely inhabited grasslands or a mosaic of grassland and forests. Recovered remains suggests that the species inhabited a wide range of altitudes, from below current sea level to over 1,000 metres (3,300 ft). Dental microwear analysis of a specimen from Yamanashi Prefecture suggests that it had a diet heavy in coarse browse like bark and twigs. Palaeoloxodon naumanni lived alongside other megafauna species, including the extinct giant deer Sinomegaceros yabei, sika deer, Japanese serow, moose, musk deer, the extinct steppe bison, brown bears, black bears, wolves, and cave lions.

== Relationship with humans ==
Humans are thought to have arrived in the Japanese archipelago around 40,000 years ago. Bones of P. naumanni alongside those of the extinct giant deer Sinomegaceros yabei at Lake Nojiri in Nagano Prefecture dating to approximately 37,900 years Before Present, have been found together with many lithic and bone tool artifacts, suggesting that the elephants were butchered by humans at the site.

== Extinction ==
A 2012 study found the most recent reliable dates for the species were around 24,000 years Before Present (BP), during the early stages of the Last Glacial Maximum. The study considered any more recent dates unreliable. A 2026 study instead suggested that the latest reliably dated specimen of the species dated to around 36,400–35,700 years BP and that the later dates reported in the 2012 paper had been due to contamination. They suggested that the species became extinct within a few thousand years of this youngest dated specimen. The extinction of P. naumanni forms part of the broader Late Pleistocene megafaunal extinctions, in which most large animals globally became extinct. Some authors have suggested that its extinction was due to climatic change resulting in loss of habitat and population fragmentation, while others suggest humans may have been a contributing factor in the extinction. A 2025 paper suggested that ecological inflexibility was not a factor that contributed to the extinction of P. naumanni.

== See also ==
- Chūrui Naumann Elephant Museum
- Lake Nojiri Naumann Elephant Museum
