= Heinrich Edmund Naumann =

German geologist (1854–1927)

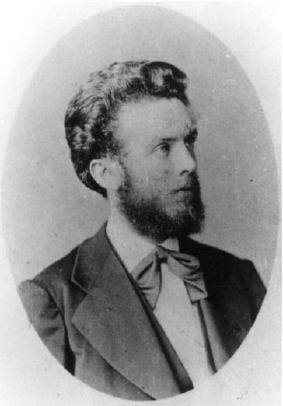
- Heinrich Edmund Naumann
- Born: September 11, 1854; Meissen, Germany
- Died: February 1, 1927 (aged 72); Frankfurt, Germany
- Known for: Fossa Magna (ja)
- Scientific career
- Fields: Geology

Heinrich Edmund Naumann (September 11, 1854 – February 1, 1927) was a German geologist, regarded as the "father of Japanese geology" in Meiji period Japan.

== Biography ==
Heinrich Edmund Naumann was hired by the Meiji government in 1875 as a foreign advisor, with the task of introducing the science of geology to Japan through his teaching at the Kaisei Gakkō, the forerunner to Tokyo Imperial University.

Naumann arrived in Japan just one month before his twenty-fifth birthday, receiving a yearly salary of 3600 yen. Overall, he spent ten years in Japan, and wrote numerous scientific papers, most of which remain untranslated from the original German. During his early years in Japan, he both cooperated with, and competed against, fellow geologist John Milne. Both were part of the European scientific community interested in exploring the origins of the earth and the fledgling science of vulcanology. In 1877, Naumann and Milne investigated a volcanic eruption on the island of Izu Ōshima near Tokyo. However, by the 1880s, Milne focused more on seismology, whereas Naumann concentrated on his attempts to complete a geological map of the Japanese archipelago.

Naumann conducted numerous geological surveys, traveling over 10,000 kilometers within Japan, covering almost every province in Honshū, Kyūshū and Shikoku. In 1879, Naumann began publishing his ideas of the geological origins of the Japanese archipelago, which he speculated was created from three major foldings of the Earth's crust, in the pre-Paleozoic, late Paleozoic and Miocene era, and that Japan was composed of two major mountain systems, in the southwest and the northeast. The divide between these mountain systems, a great fault zone which vertically divides the main Japanese island of Honshū from the Izu Peninsula in the southwest to Toyama in the northeast, he labeled the Fossa magna.

Per Naumann's suggestions, the Japanese Ministry of Agriculture and Commerce established a Geology Department in 1878, which began the process of systematically mapping the Japanese archipelago. The foundation of the Geological Survey of Japan came a year before the foundation of the equivalent United States Geological Survey in the United States.

Naumann was also interested in paleontology. In 1881, he published a paper on his findings with regards to the findings of fossilized bones remains of elephants in Japan. Elephants were known from the Tokugawa period through Buddhism and as samples brought by Dutch embassies, but were not previously known to have been native to Japan, so his findings received widespread popular publicity. One of the fossils Naumann examined from modern-day Tokyo proved to be a previously unknown extinct species, which was named in his honor: Palaeoloxodon naumanni). Other specimens were found at Lake Nojiri in Nagano Prefecture, and have later been discovered in Kyūshū.

Naumann did not actually excavate any fossils, but examined samples unearthed by Japanese and Western antiquarians, including samples excavated by Dr Edward S. Morse at the Ōmori shell mounds several years previously. The main significance of Naumann's report was his placement of the fossils in the Pliocene era. Due to the quantity of fossils discovered (both of elephants and other animals as well as of plants), Naumann postulated that Japan was once connected to the Asian mainland via several land bridges through what is now the Korean Peninsula, the Kurile Islands and the Ryukyu Islands, and that the climate at the time was tropical. This discovery, based by scientific evidence, that the Japanese archipelago was geologically an appendage to the Asian mainland, had geo-political implications which were not lost on the Meiji government, and geographical offices with often overlapping or conflicting jurisdictions were soon created within the Ministry of Education, Ministry of Finance, Home Minister, and Ministry of War.

Naumann's years in Japan were eventful. Known for his quick temper, Naumann was known occasionally beating his students, and also came to blows with a subordinate, fellow German topographer, Otto Schmidt, whom he accused of having an affair with his wife. The brawl, which occurred in 1882, was highly public and was sensationalized in the foreign language newspapers in Japan. It resulted in Naumann's arrest and trial before the German Consulate, at which he was fined 300 Marks (ℳ), but he was able to keep his position.

After his return to Germany, Naumann continued his work in geology, making important contributions to geological understanding of Anatolia and Mesopotamia.

However, after his return to Germany, Naumann also made numerous public comments that were highly critical of Japanese modernization efforts, some of which were published in the Allgemeine Zeitung newspaper. Naumann argued that Japan was a dirty, impoverished and backward country, plagued by infectious diseases and barbarous customs. He lambasted the Japanese government for importing western culture and technologies indiscriminately, without any true understanding. Naumann stated that while there were many aspects of Japanese traditional culture that were admirable, the modern Japanese themselves had only contempt for their own history and traditions, and that this lack of respect for their own culture was a serious weakness. These statements were read by Mori Ōgai, who was studying western medicine in Berlin at the time, leading to a heated newspaper debate. While Mori could easily refute some of Naumann's statements regarding Japanese backwardness, he found it more difficult to refute Naumann's criticism on Japanese westernization. On his return to Japan, Mori himself began to question and oppose efforts at shallow modernization and mimicry of all things Western, and to push for more respect for Japanese traditions. The arguments Naumann postulated were contemporary and similar with the writings of Japanese journalist Kuga Katsunan.

The city of Itoigawa, Niigata in Japan opened a museum in Naumann's honor in 1973.

== Major works ==
- Vom Goldenen Horn zu den Quellen des Euphrat (1893)
- Geologische Arbeiten in Japan (1901)
