= Lake Nojiri =

Lake

- 野尻湖 (Japanese)
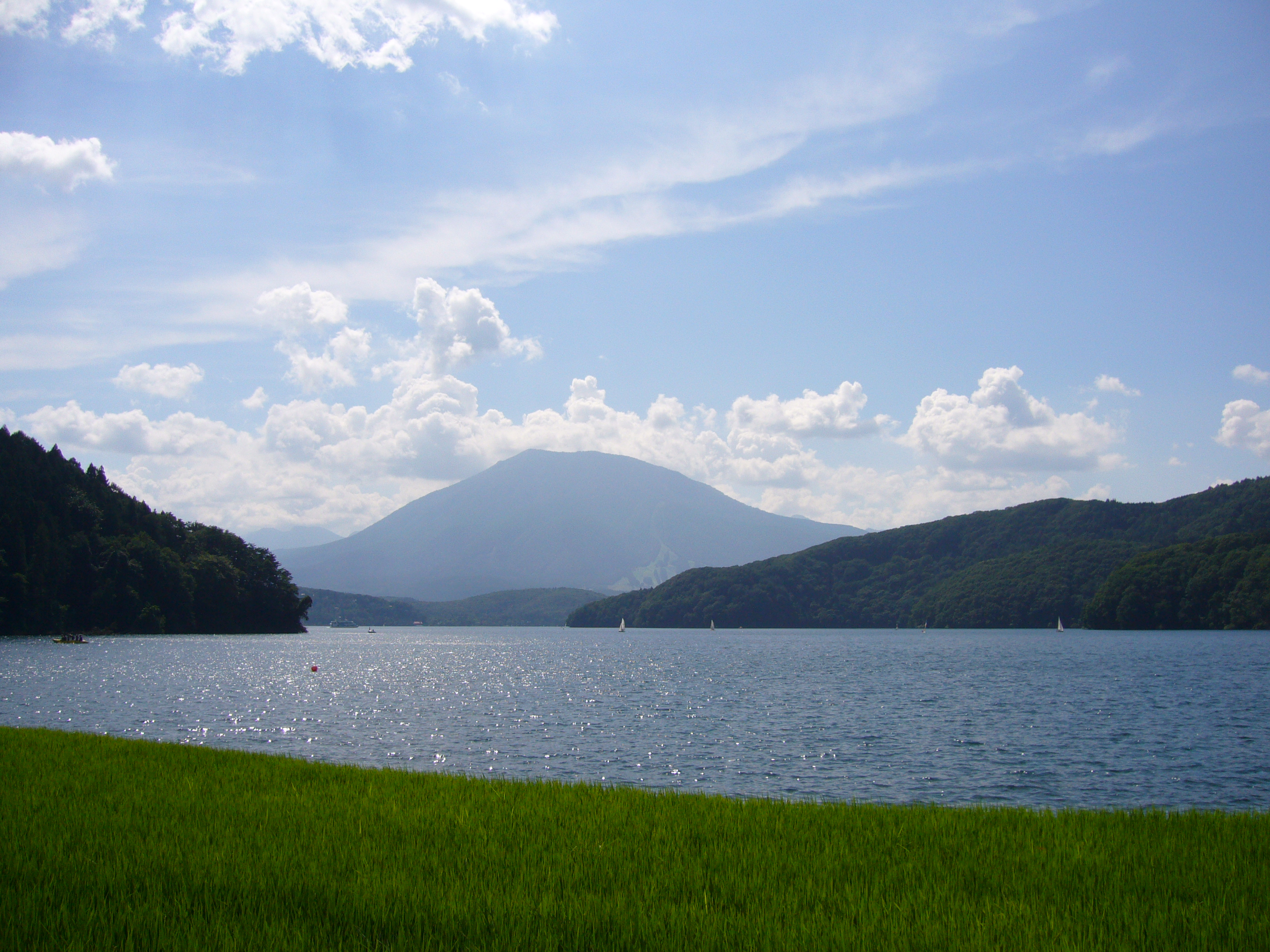
- Lake and Mt. Kurohime

- Location within Japan
- Location: Shinano, Kamiminochi District, Nagano Prefecture
- Coordinates: 36°49′35″N 138°13′19″E
- Basin countries: Japan
- Surface area: 4.56 km^{2} (1.76 sq mi)
- Average depth: 21 m (69 ft)
- Max. depth: 38.5 m (126 ft)
- Water volume: 0.096 km^{3} (78,000 acre⋅ft)
- Shore length^{1}: 16 km (9.9 mi)
- Surface elevation: 657 m (2,156 ft)
- ^{1} Shore length is not a well-defined measure.

Lake Nojiri (野尻湖, Nojiri-ko) is in the town of Shinano, Kamiminochi District, Nagano Prefecture, Japan. Second to Lake Suwa among lakes in Nagano Prefecture, Nojiri is a resort, the location of the first pumped-storage hydroelectricity in Japan, and the site of a Japanese Paleolithic excavation.

== Data ==
- Transparency: 5–7 m

== Geography ==
The lake is located on a plateau with an altitude of 654m, which is between Mount Madarao in the east and Mount Kurohime in the west. With an area of 4.56 km^{2}, it is the second largest natural lake in Nagano Prefecture after Lake Suwa. It has a depth of 39.1 m (128.2 ft), and its storage volume exceeds that of Lake Suwa. The water of the lake flows out through the Ikejiri River, joins the Seki River, and flows into the Sea of Japan. There are various theories regarding the creation of lake and it might have been dammed by the eruption of Mt. Madarao, or that it was dammed by the Ikejiri River mud flow caused by the eruption of Mt. Kurohime.

== Fishing ==
The lake rarely freezes over in the winter. "Dome boats," outfitted with stoves, catch smelt (Hypomesus nipponensis) in Lake Nojiri. The lake was once the home of native Japanese trout but now is home to bass from the United States.

== Tategahana Paleolithic Site ==
In 1946, a tusk of Palaeoloxodon naumanni (Naumann's Elephant, named in honor of the geologist Heinrich Edmund Naumann, 1854–1927) was accidentally discovered. In 1962, excavations began at the edge and on the bottom of the lake. The location was a promontory known as Tategahana on the western shore. Discoveries included implements of stone and bone, fossils of Palaeoloxodon naumanni, and of deer. Analyses of diatoms, pollen, paleomagnetism, and volcanic ash place the site, with its fossils of humans and megafauna, in the Paleolithic, the Pleistocene, about 40,000 years ago. Kondo et al. conclude that Tategahana is a "kill-butchering site."

== See also ==
- List of fossil sites
