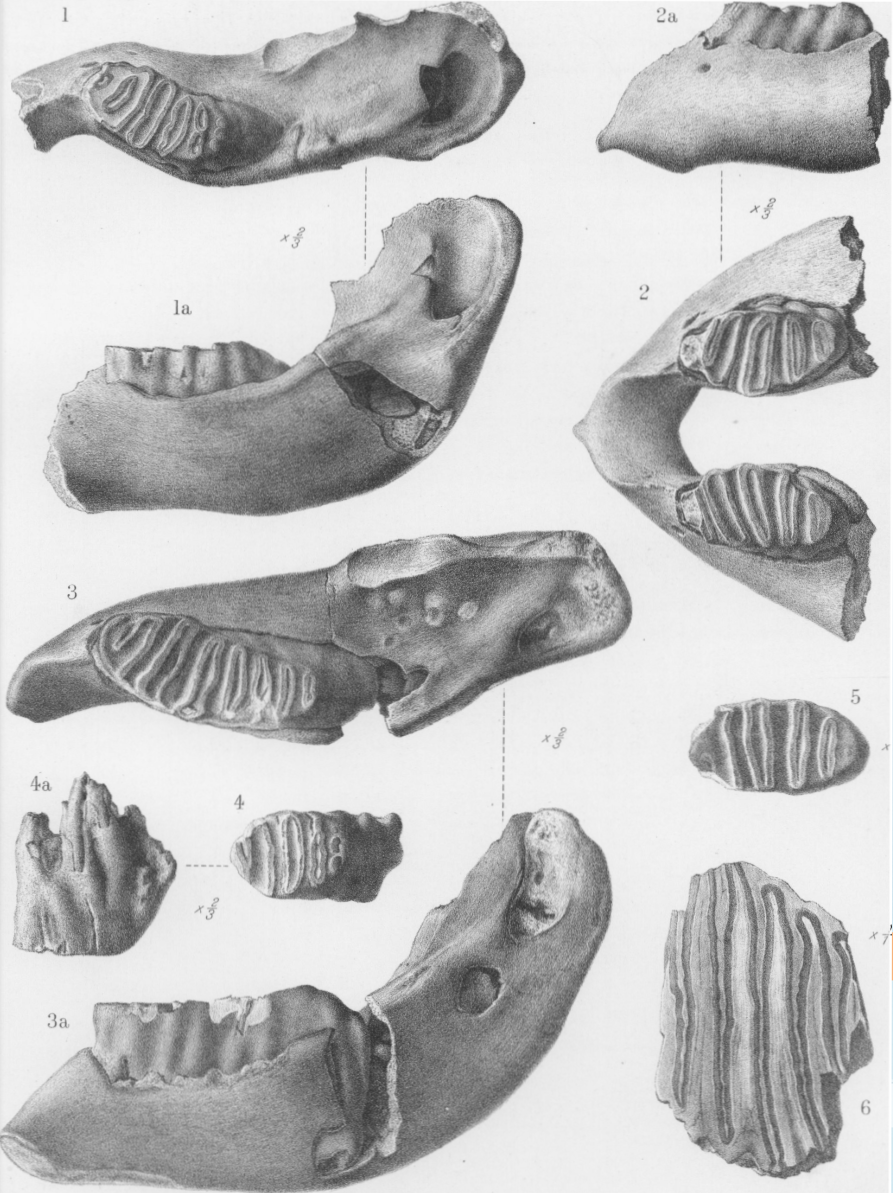
- Molar and jaw fragments from type locality

Scientific classification
- Kingdom: Animalia
- Phylum: Chordata
- Class: Mammalia
- Order: Proboscidea
- Family: Elephantidae
- Genus: †Palaeoloxodon
- Species: †P. cypriotes

Binomial name
- †Palaeoloxodon cypriotes (Bate, 1904)

Synonyms
- Elephas cypriotes Bate 1904

= Palaeoloxodon cypriotes =

Cyprus dwarf elephant Temporal range: Late Pleistocene–Holocene

Extinct species of dwarf elephant native to Cyprus

Palaeoloxodon cypriotes is an extinct species of dwarf elephant that inhabited the island of Cyprus during the Late Pleistocene. A probable descendant of the large straight-tusked elephant of mainland Europe and West Asia, the species is among the smallest known dwarf elephants, with fully grown individuals having an estimated shoulder height of only 1 m (39 in; 3 ft 3 in). It represented one of only two large animal species on the island alongside the Cypriot pygmy hippopotamus. The species became extinct around 12,000 years ago, around the time humans first colonised Cyprus, and potential (but disputed) evidence of human hunting has been found.

== History of research and excavations ==
The first recorded finds were by Dorothea Bate in 1902 from the cave deposit of Páno Díkomo-Imbohary in the southern part of the Pentadáktylos/Kyrenia mountain range that runs across northern Cyprus. The remains were originally described in a paper in Proceedings of the Royal Society in 1903 by Bate, when the species was named as Elephas cypriotes, with additional description of the remains in a later paper in the Philosophical Transactions of the Royal Society in 1905. This locality remains one of the richest sites of the species remains. Remains of dwarf elephants have now been found at over 20 localities across Cyprus. These localities include rockshelters, caves as well as sites adjacent to rivers or ponds and alluvial fan deposits.

== Evolution ==
It is probable that P. cypriotes is descended from Palaeoloxodon xylophagou, a species which is known from a partial skull collected near the village of Xylofagou in southeast Cyprus dating to the late Middle Pleistocene (MIS 7, 243–191,000 years ago) alongside molars, tusks and sparse postcranial remains from two other sites in southeast Cyprus, Achna and Ormídeia. Both species are considered to have ultimately descended from the very large straight-tusked elephant (Palaeoloxodon antiquus) of mainland Europe and Western Asia. Cyprus remained an island even during episodes of low sea level, suggesting that the ancestors of the Cyprus dwarf elephants arrived on the island by swimming, with the likeliest route being from southeastern Anatolia (in what is now Turkey) to the Karpas Peninsula on the northeast of the island, which even considering additional exposed land area due to lowered sea levels during glacial periods is a minimum of 60 kilometres (37 mi), further than the known swimming distance record for elephants (48 kilometres (30 mi)), suggesting that it was an unlikely "sweepstakes dispersal". Although it is possible that both species descend from separate dispersals, the extreme remoteness of Cyprus makes this less likely. Cyprus would likely have been visible from mainland Anatolia. The size reduction was the result of insular dwarfism, which is likely the result of the reduction in available food, predation and competition. P. xylophagou is around 3.5 times larger than P. cypriotes, but still strongly dwarfed, only around 7% the size of its mainland ancestor, and has a skull that is heavily modified from that of P. antiquus, being relatively wide, long and low, and lacking the forehead crest found in P. antiquus.

== Description ==
Palaeoloxodon cypriotes was comparable in size or slightly larger than Palaeoloxodon falconeri from Sicily (depicted)

Palaeoloxodon cypriotes is known from fragmentary remains, primarily molar teeth, along with tusks and rare postcranial material, including a femur. Palaeoloxodon cypriotes was around 1 metre (3.3 ft) tall when fully grown, making it among the smallest known dwarf elephant species, along with the comparably sized dwarf mammoth Mammuthus creticus of Crete, and the Sicilian-Maltese Palaeoloxodon falconeri, The estimated body weight of P. cypriotes is only 200 kilograms (440 lb), a weight reduction of 98% from its straight-tusked elephant ancestors, which weighed about 10 tonnes.

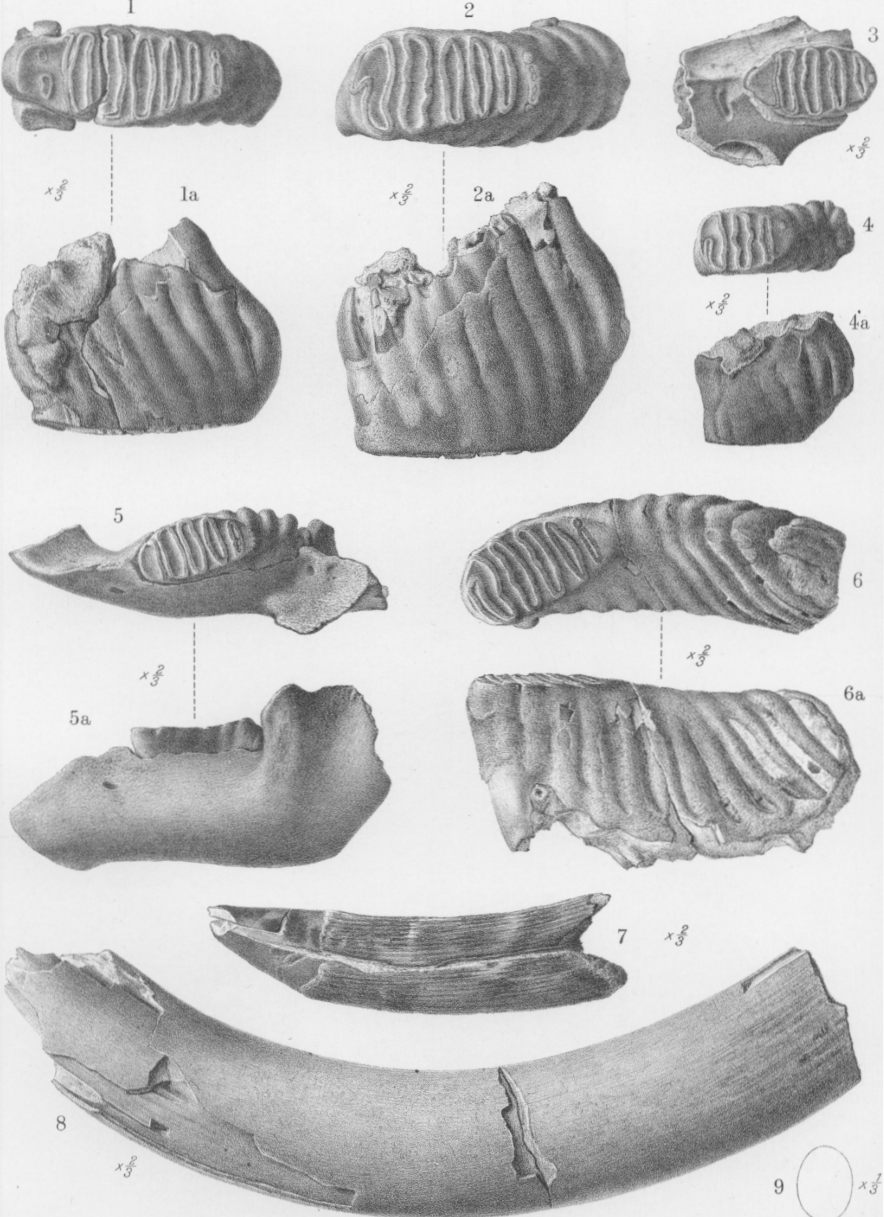
Jaw, molar, and tusk fragments of P. cypriotes as illustrated in Bate (1905)

The molars of P. cypriotes were 40% of the linear size of mainland straight-tusked elephants' molars (with the teeth around the size of the milk molars of P. antiquus), which retained the same length-width ratio, but with reduced lamellae (plate) counts, with only 11 lamellae in the third molar as opposed to 18 in mainland P. antiquus, with the layer of enamel also being proportionally thicker (though similar in absolute thickness) than P. antiquus. This was likely to maintain similar levels of shearing functionality despite the much smaller size of the tooth. In comparison to P. falconeri, the molar teeth dimensions are somewhat smaller, suggesting that the teeth of P. cypriotes are around the same size relative to body size as its ancestors, rather than the teeth being proportionally enlarged as seen in some other dwarf elephants. Like P. falconeri, the plates of the molar teeth grew much more slowly than those of full sized elephants, which may suggest that like P. falconeri, P. cypriotes had a long lifespan comparable to those of full-sized elephants.

Analysis of the tusks suggests that they were proportionally more curved than that of the straight-tusked elephant, as well as being more strongly oval shaped (more narrow on one axis) in cross section (with the narrower axis being outwards to the side/towards the midline of the animal relative to the orientation of the tusks in life).

== Ecology ==
The morphology of the femur, which is similar to that of P. falconeri, suggests that P. cypriotes was likely adapted to moving on more steep terrain than living elephants. Fossils of the elephant indicate that it inhabited a wide range of elevations, including the Troodos foothills, with one find around 300 metres (980 ft) up the slopes of Mount Olympus, the highest mountain on the island.

Cyprus exhibited a depauperate fauna during the Late Pleistocene, with the only other large mammal species being the Cypriot pygmy hippopotamus, with the only other terrestrial mammal species being the Cypriot mouse (which is still extant), and a species of genet (Genetta plesictoides), and thus the elephant had no natural predators. Remains of dwarf elephants are considerably less abundant than those of dwarf hippopotamus in fossil deposits, which may reflect that the dwarf elephants were less likely to become stuck in natural traps.

Due to the rarity of natural permanent water bodies on Cyprus (the island currently lacks permanent rivers), pollen records that could be used to determine past climate conditions are rare and poorly dated. The vegetation may have been similar to present conditions, with a mixture of forest (which today is primarily confined to mountain slopes), and open areas including grassland.

== Extinction ==
The youngest well-dated remains of the species are known from Aetókremnos in southern Cyprus, which has been radiocarbon dated to around 11,504–12,096 years Before Present, close to the Pleistocene-Holocene boundary. This site is also considered to be the location of some of the earliest evidence of human habitation of Cyprus, who are suggested to have arrived on the island around 12–13,000 years ago. It has been argued that the remains of hippos and elephants at the site were transported there by humans, and therefore provides evidence for hunting of P. cypriotes (as well as dwarf hippopotamus) by Cyprus's earliest hunter-gatherer inhabitants, which may have been the cause of its extinction, though this has been contested by some authors who argue that the bones naturally accumulated at the site separately from the human occupation.

A 2024 study estimated that at the time of human arrival, the population of dwarf elephants on Cyprus to have been around 5000 individuals. The population would likely have been sensitive to hunting due to their slow life cycles, with the authors calculating that rates of over 200 individuals being killed per year put the species at risk of extinction, with extinction becoming essentially inevitable at over 350 hunted per year (realistically accomplishable with a human population of only a few thousand people probably present on Cyprus during this period). This likely would have resulted in a relatively rapid extinction following the colonisation at Cyprus, with the authors estimating a latest possible extinction date (taking into account the Signor-Lipps effect) of around 10,300-9,100 years ago.

== See also ==
- Palaeoloxodon tiliensis a species of dwarf elephant native to the Greek island of Tilos, possibly survived later than P. cypriotes
