= Palaeoloxodon tiliensis =

Palaeoloxodon tiliensis Temporal range: Late Pleistocene Possible Holocene records

Scientific classification
- Kingdom: Animalia
- Phylum: Chordata
- Class: Mammalia
- Order: Proboscidea
- Family: Elephantidae
- Genus: †Palaeoloxodon
- Species: †P. tiliensis

Binomial name
- †Palaeoloxodon tiliensis (Theodorou, Symeonidis &, Stathopoulou, 2007)

Synonyms
- Elephas tiliensis Theodorou, Symeonidis &, Stathopoulou, 2007

Extinct species of dwarf elephant

Palaeoloxodon tiliensis is an extinct species of dwarf elephant belonging to the genus Palaeoloxodon. It was endemic to the small Greek island of Tilos, one of the Dodecanese islands in the eastern Aegean Sea off of the coast of Anatolia during the Late Pleistocene and possibly the Holocene. Remains, comprising over 10,000 bones and bone fragments, have been found in Charkadio cave. A probable descendant of the large straight-tusked elephant (Palaeoloxodon antiquus), it has been claimed to have survived as recently as 3,500 years ago based on preliminary radiocarbon dating done in the 1970s, which would make it the youngest surviving dwarf elephant as well as elephant in Europe, but other authors have regarded this dating as unconfirmed.

== History of research ==
Remains of elephants were first described from Charkadio cave on Tilos in 1972. The authors of this publication attributed the remains to the species "Palaeoloxodon antiquus melitensis" and "Palaeoloxodon antiquus falconeri", with later publications from 1975 using the names P. antiquus falconeri, and "Palaeoloxodon antiquus mnaidriensis" to refer to the remains, as they assumed that two species were present in the cave (with "P. a. mnaidriensis" suggested to be in lower levels in the cave than "P. a. falconeri"). Other authors argued that only one species existed in the cave, using the name P. antiquus falconeri to refer to it, despite publications following on from a detailed description of the remains in 1983 suggesting that it belonged to its own new species (the names Palaeoloxodon falconeri and Palaeoloxodon mnaidriensis properly refer to dwarf elephant species from Sicily and Malta). Further excavations were carried out in the cave until 2007, when the species was given the name Elephas tiliensis. Later studies have generally recognised it as a species of the genus Palaeoloxodon as Palaeoloxodon tiliensis.

== Description ==
External image
- Skeleton of Palaeoloxodon tiliensis on display in Tilos

Maximum and average size of P. tiliensis compared to humans

Most remains found within the cave are disarticulated, though relatively complete articulated limbs have been found. The remains span from those of juveniles to adults, with over 15,000 bones or bone fragments in total being excavated from the cave, representing at least 45 individuals. P. tiliensis was around 10% the size of its large presumed mainland ancestor, the straight-tusked elephant (Palaeoloxodon antiquus). The maximum shoulder height has been estimated at around 1.9 m (6 ft 3 in), with a 2012 study calculating an average height of 1.55 m (5 ft 1 in), with body mass estimates ranging from 630–890 kg (1,390–1,960 lb) to 1,300 kg (2,900 lb). Its smaller body size compared to its ancestor was the result of insular dwarfism, which causes the body size of animals to reduce on islands due to the reduction in food, predation and competition. The species appears to have been sexually dimorphic based on the presence of two distinct size clusters among adult remains, with the larger morph likely representing males as in living elephants. The molar teeth had around 11 plates, lower than the number present in the molars of P. antiquus. The tusks reach a maximum length of around 1 m (39 in), and are only curved along one axis. The limb bones were relatively slender, and the shape and the position of the foot bones (metacarpals and metatarsals) are also different from other Palaeoloxodon species suggesting that it was adapted to moving on steep terrain. The limb bones display other differences from those of P. antiquus, such as having a lower trabecular bone density, the greater trochanter of the humerus having a different, more cranial orientation, the radius having a considerably larger head and neck and having a thicker cortex, a less robust ulna, a much more medially orientated femoral head, and thinner femoral neck, the medullary area of the femur not having any trabecular bone, as well as a less developed intercondylar eminence on the tibia. Such changes likely reflect significant differences in the way the weight was borne by the limb bones due to the much smaller body size.

Analysis of its petrosal bone and inner ear suggests that it was similar to that of other elephants, adapted to hear infrasound that elephants use for communication.

== Distribution and chronology ==
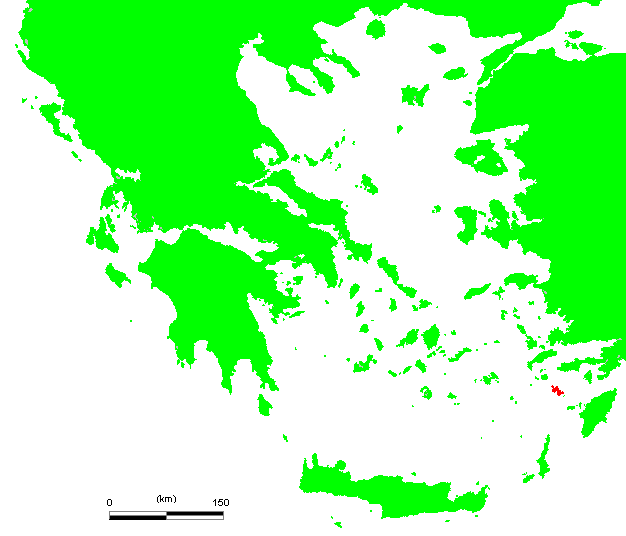
Location of Tilos (red) In the Aegean

Remains of Palaeoloxodon tiliensis are entirely found within Charkadio Cave, which located on the small 60 square kilometres (23 sq mi) island of Tilos, one of the Dodecanese islands off the southwestern coast of Anatolia (modern Turkey). The small island has a highly rugged terrain, reaching 687 metres (2,254 ft) above sea level at its highest point, with very few flat areas. The ancestors of P. tiliensis probably swam from mainland Anatolia or island hopped from adjacent islands (such as Rhodes, from which a similarly sized unnamed dwarf elephant species is also known), both of which required swimming across several kilometers of open water, over 20 kilometres (12 mi) considering a direct migration from Anatolia to Tilos, even considering lowered sea level during glacial periods.

Remains of fallow deer have also been found in the cave, but they only appear in earlier, lower stratigraphic layers and appear to have become extinct before the arrival of the elephants. Remains of other animals found in the cave in layers contemporaneous with the elephants include the living marginated tortoise (Testudo marginata), and various birds, with remains of several bat species having also been reported from the cave. Terrestrial mammals found on the island in recent or historical times, such as white-breasted hedgehog (Erinaceus concolor), shrews (Crocidura spp.), field mice (Apodemus spp.), beech martens (Martes foina) red foxes (Vulpes vulpes) black rats (Rattus rattus) and house mice (Mus domesticus) have probably been introduced by humans after the extinction of the elephants. Remains of a brown bear (Ursus arctos) found in Charadiko cave are assumed to have been a hunting trophy transported to the island by humans.

Based on radiocarbon dating and uranium–thorium dating done in the 1970s and 1980s, it was proposed that P. tiliensis inhabited the island from around 50,000 years ago until around 3,500 years ago (around 1500 BC), which if confirmed would place P. tiliensis as the youngest surviving elephant in Europe. However, many recent authors have regarded this young extinction date (which would place the extinction of the elephants in the late Bronze Age) as uncertain/tentative and requiring further study of the cave's chronostratigraphy, with the quality of the currently existing radiocarbon and uranium dating having been seriously questioned. The radiocarbon dating samples did not undergo ultrafiltration to remove contamination like modern radiocarbon dating samples and modern attempts to radiocarbon date P. tiliensis bones have found that the collagen levels were too low to get meaningful radiocarbon dates, and the uranium dating was probably done directly on bones, which are susceptible to both uptake and leaching of uranium, either of which would compromise the validity of the dating. Dating of layers of volcanic tuff as well as re-dating a layer of calcite found in the cave interbedded with the layers containing fossils potentially provide ways to more definitively resolve the cave's chronology. Evidence found in the cave (unassociated with the elephants) and elsewhere on the island demonstrates that humans were already present on Tilos by the Final Neolithic period, around 4000-3000 BC, shortly before the beginning of the Bronze Age. No clear evidence has been found for the chronological overlap of humans and elephants on the island, and layers with both elephant bones and human artifacts appear to have been reworked (disturbed and mixed). An eruption of a nearby volcano, such as that of Santorini/Thera (or alternatively Kos or Nisyros) has been suggested as a possible cause of the extinction of P. tiliensis, though no particular eruptive episode (such as the famous ~1600-1500 BC Minoan eruption, suggested by some authors based on the contested 1500 BC extinction date) can be specifically implicated (there have been 12 major eruptions of Santorini/Thera in the last 200,000 years).

== See also ==
- Palaeoloxodon cypriotes a dwarf elephant native to the island of Cyprus, suggested to have survived until human arrival around 12,000 years ago
