= Genetta plesictoides =

Genetta plesictoides Temporal range: Late Pleistocene

Scientific classification
- Kingdom: Animalia
- Phylum: Chordata
- Class: Mammalia
- Order: Carnivora
- Family: Viverridae
- Genus: Genetta
- Species: †G. plesictoides

Binomial name
- †Genetta plesictoides (Bate, 1903)

Extinct species of viverrid

Genetta plesictoides, also known as the Cypriot genet, is an extinct species of genet that was endemic to Cyprus during the Late Pleistocene. It was first described by Dorothy Bate in 1903. The Cypriot genet was similar in size to the common genet. In comparison to its close living relative, its dental morphology showed adaptations towards a more carnivorous diet. It likely became extinct around 12,000-10,800 years Before Present, following the arrival of humans to Cyprus and the introduction of invasive species.
