= Dwarf elephant =

Prehistoric elephant species

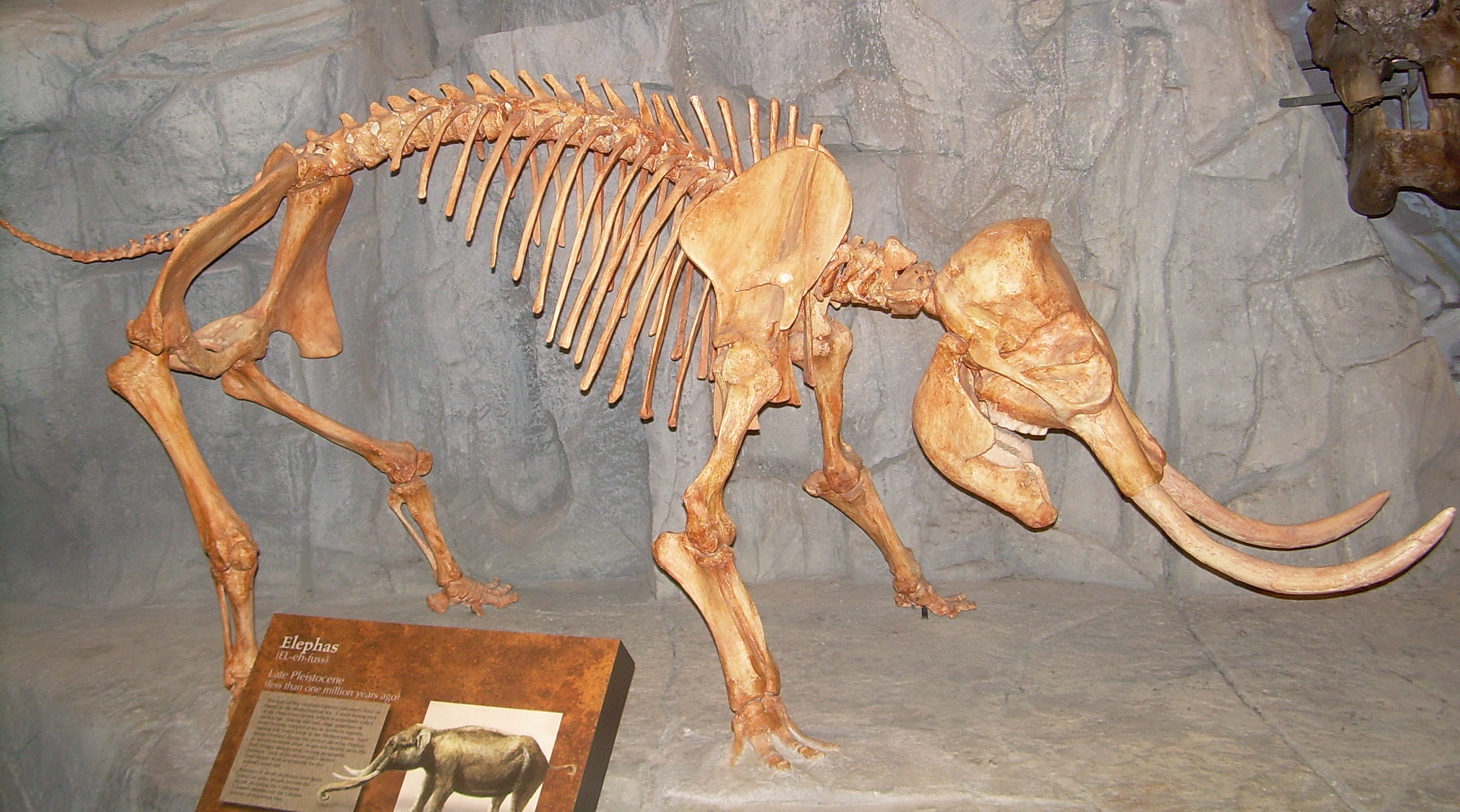
Palaeoloxodon falconeri skeleton cast

Dwarf elephants are prehistoric members of the order Proboscidea which, through the process of allopatric speciation on islands, evolved much smaller body sizes (around 1–2.3 metres (3 ft 3 in – 7 ft 7 in) shoulder height) in comparison with their immediate ancestors. Dwarf elephants are an example of insular dwarfism, the phenomenon whereby large terrestrial vertebrates (usually mammals) that colonize islands evolve dwarf forms, a phenomenon attributed to adaptation to resource-poor environments and lack of predation and competition.

Fossil remains of dwarf elephants have been found on the Mediterranean islands of Cyprus, Malta, Crete, Sicily, Sardinia, the Cyclades Islands and the Dodecanese Islands, which are mostly members of the genus Palaeoloxodon, descending from the large 4 metres (13 ft) tall straight-tusked elephant (Palaeoloxodon antiquus) of mainland Europe, though two species represent dwarf mammoths. Dwarf species of elephants and Stegodon have been found on the islands of Indonesia and the Philippines, with dwarfed species of Stegodon also having been found in Japan. The Channel Islands of California once supported the pygmy mammoth, a dwarf species descended from Columbian mammoths, while the woolly mammoths that existed on Wrangel Island north of Siberia were once considered dwarfs, but are not anymore.

== The Mediterranean islands ==
Mediterranean islands with remains of dwarf proboscideans
genus Palaeoloxodon
genus Mammuthus
both genera present in Crete
Proboscidean remains from the Cyclades that can't be confidently assigned to a single proboscidean genus or to a dwarf species.

Size comparison of the Sicilian species Palaeoloxodon falconeri, one of the smallest dwarf elephants, compared to a human

Dwarf elephants first inhabited the Mediterranean islands during the Pleistocene, including all the major islands with the apparent exception of Corsica and the Balearics. Mediterranean dwarf elephants have generally been considered as members of the genus Palaeoloxodon, derived from the continental straight-tusked elephant, Palaeoloxodon antiquus (Falconer & Cautley, 1847), Syn.: Elephas antiquus. An exception is the dwarf Middle-Late Pleistocene Sardinian mammoth, Mammuthus lamarmorai (Major, 1883), the first endemic elephant of the Mediterranean islands recognized as belonging to the mammoth line. Mammuthus creticus from the Early Pleistocene of Crete, formerly considered a member of Palaeoloxodon, is now also considered to be a mammoth, and approaches the size of the smallest dwarf elephants.

During low sea levels, the Mediterranean islands were colonised again and again, giving rise, sometimes on the same island, to several species (or subspecies) of different body sizes. The island of Sicily appears to have been colonised by proboscideans in at least two separate waves of colonisation. These endemic dwarf elephants were taxonomically different on each island or group of very close islands, like the Cyclades archipelago.

There are many uncertainties about the time of colonisation, the phylogenetic relationships and the taxonomic status of dwarf elephants on the Mediterranean islands. Extinction of the insular dwarf elephants has not been correlated with the arrival of humans to the islands, with the exception of Palaeoloxodon cypriotes on Cyprus, which survived until human colonisation of the island around 12,000 years ago.

Palaeontologist Othenio Abel proposed in 1914 that the finding of skeletons of such elephants sparked the idea that they belonged to giant one-eyed monsters, because the center nasal opening was thought to be the socket of a single eye, and thus perhaps were, for example, the origin of the one-eyed Cyclopes of Greek mythology. While this claim has been widely been repeated, it has been criticised for lacking evidence.

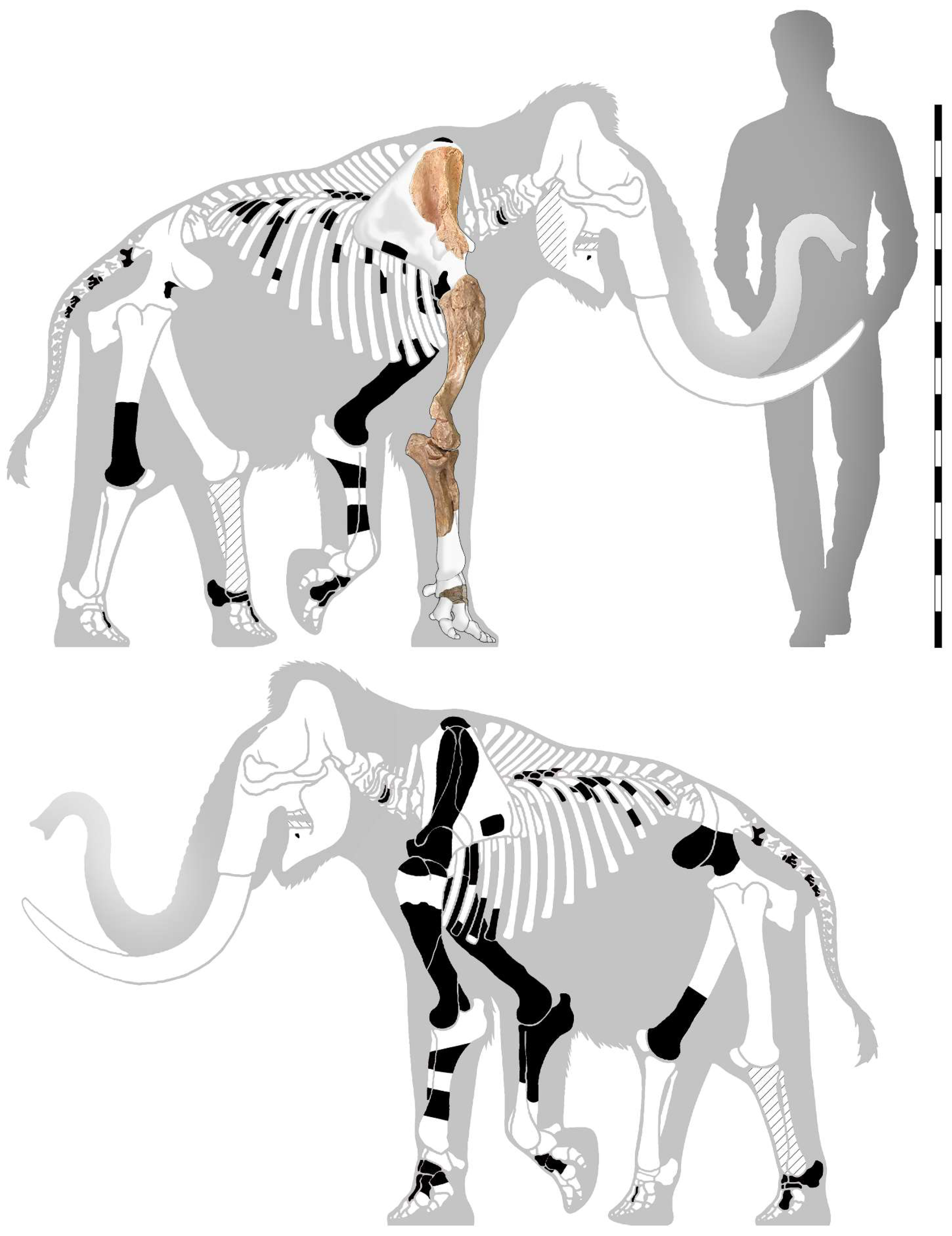
Size comparison of dwarf Sardinian mammoth Mammuthus lamarmorai compared to a human

=== Italy and Malta ===
| Island | Taxon | Author |
|---|---|---|
| Sardinia | Mammuthus lamarmorai | (Major, 1883) |
| Malta | Palaeoloxodon falconeri | (Busk, 1869) |
| Malta | Palaeoloxodon mnaidriensis | (Adams, 1874) |
| Sicily | Palaeoloxodon falconeri | (Busk, 1869) |
| Sicily | Palaeoloxodon cf. mnaidriensis | (Adams, 1874) |

connected during LGM

Sicily and Malta were inhabited by two successive waves of dwarf elephants derived from P. antiquus, which first arrived on the islands at least 500,000 years ago. The first of these species is P. falconeri , which is one of the smallest dwarf elephant species at around 1 metre (3.3 ft) tall, and was strongly modified from its ancestor in numerous aspects, which lived in a depauperate fauna with no other large mammal species. Later, around 200,000 years ago, this species was replaced by a second colonisation by P. antiquus, which gave rise to the larger (though still considerably dwarfed) 2 metres (6.6 ft) tall species P. mnaidriensis, which on Sicily lived alongside a number other large mammal species, including herbivores and carnivores. The youngest records of this species on Sicily date to around 20,000 years ago, close to the time of arrival of modern humans on Sicily.

The dwarf mammoth species Mammuthus lamarmorai descended from steppe mammoths (Mammuthus trogontherii) that colonised Sardinia sometime after 450,000 years ago. It is suggested to have survived into the Last Glacial Period, until at least 60-30,000 years ago.

=== Greece ===
==== Crete ====
| Island | Taxon | Author |
|---|---|---|
| Crete | Mammuthus creticus | (Bate, 1907) |
| Crete | Palaeoloxodon creutzburgi | (Kuss, 1965) |

Mammuthus creticus is known from remains probably dating to the Early Pleistocene. It likely descends from Mammuthus meridionalis. It is the smallest mammoth and is among the smallest dwarf elephants known, with a shoulder height of about 1 metre (3.3 ft) and a weight of about 180 kilograms (400 lb). Palaeoloxodon creutzburgi from the Middle Pleistocene and Late Pleistocene is significantly larger, with an estimated body mass comparable to living Asian elephant, around 40% the size of its mainland ancestor.

==== Cyclades ====
| Island | Taxon | Author |
|---|---|---|
| Delos | Palaeoloxodon sp. | Vaufrey, 1929 |
| Naxos | Palaeoloxodon lomolinoi | Van der Geer et al., 2014 |
| Paros | Elephantidae indet. | Georgalas, 1929 |
| Kythnos | Elephantidae indet. | Honea, 1975 |
| Milos | Elephantidae indet. | Papp, 1953 |
| Serifos | Elephantidae indet. | Papp, 1953 |

connected during LGM

Remains of dwarf elephants have been briefly reported from Paros, Milos and Serifos in historical publications, but these lack any detailed information.

On Kýthnos, the remains of a dwarf elephant were reported in a 1975 publication to be found associated with lithic artefacts. The age of the find was considered to be uncertain, likely older than 9,000 years, but could not be dated precisely due to a lack of collagen. Additionally, an isolated tusk was reported from the northwest of the island.

On Delos, an indeterminate dwarf elephant known from a third molar was reported in 1908. This specimen clearly belongs to a dwarf species, but it is difficult to quantify its size precisely. On Naxos the species Palaeoloxodon lomolinoi has been described based on a partial skull including the maxilla bones and third molar teeth found near the Trypiti river, of probable Late Pleistocene age. It is estimated to be around 8% the size of P. antiquus, and had a smaller body size than that represented by the dwarf elephant from Delos. The Eastern Cyclades islands of Delos, Naxos, and Paros were connected during the Last Glacial Period, which suggests that the Delos species and P. lomolinoi were not contemporaneous, with the former possibly being the ancestor of the latter, though nothing can be said for certain.

==== Dodecanese ====
| Island | Taxon | Author |
|---|---|---|
| Astypalaia | Palaeoloxodon sp. | Athanassiou et al., 2019 |
| Kasos | Palaeoloxodon aff. creutzburgi | Sen et al., 2014 |
| Rhodes | Palaeoloxodon sp. | Symeonides et al., 1974 |
| Tilos | Palaeoloxodon tiliensis | (Theodorou et al. 2007) |

On Rhodes, bones of an unnamed endemic dwarf elephant have been discovered in cave deposits on the east coast. This elephant was similar in size to Palaeoloxodon mnaidriensis (to which its remains were originally attributed), around 20% the size of its mainland ancestor (with an estimated weight of around 1,500 kilograms (3,300 lb)). The remains, though temporally poorly constrained, are suggested to be Late Pleistocene age. Possible tracks produced by these dwarf elephants have been reported from the southwest of the island.

Size of Palaeoloxodon tiliensis compared to humans

On Tilos, the species Palaeoloxodon tiliensis has been described from remains found in Charkadio cave. This species was medium-sized, around 10% the size of P. antiquus, with a shoulder height of up to 1.9 metres (6.2 ft), with a body mass of 630–890 kilograms (1,390–1,960 lb). Remains of the species are suggested to date to Late Pleistocene. Radiocarbon dating done in the 1970s suggested that the species survived until around 3,500 years ago, which would make the latest surviving Palaeoloxodon species and the youngest elephant in Europe, but these dates are tentative and await corroboration by other research.

On Astypalaia, a single tusk of a dwarf elephant of unknown age was excavated in the late 1990s. Due to the isolated status of the island it very likely represents an endemic species. Though the size of the animal is difficult to constrain precisely, it was probably similar in size to P. tiliensis.

On Kasos, which during the Pleistocene was connected with the islands of Karpathos and Saria, a single dwarf Palaeoloxodon molar has been found. Due to the tooth closely resembling those of the species P. creutzburgi from Crete (which is adjacent to Kasos) in size and shape, it has been referred to as P. aff. creutzburgi.

=== Cyprus ===
| Island | Taxon | Author |
|---|---|---|
| Cyprus | Palaeoloxodon cypriotes | (Bate, 1903) |
| Cyprus | Palaeoloxodon xylophagou | Athanassiou et al., 2015 |

The Cyprus dwarf elephant (Palaeoloxodon cypriotes) survived at least until 12,000 years ago, around the time of arrival of modern humans to Cyprus (who may have hunted it), making it one of the latest surviving dwarf elephants. It is also one of the smallest dwarf elephant species, comparable in size to P. falconeri, with an estimated shoulder height of 1 metre (3.3 ft). The species likely evolved from the earlier larger (though still strongly dwarfed) Palaeoloxodon xylophagou known from fossils dating to around 200,000 years ago.

Remains of the species were first discovered and recorded by Dorothea Bate in a cave in the Kyrenia hills of northern Cyprus in 1902 and reported in 1903.

== The Channel Islands of California ==
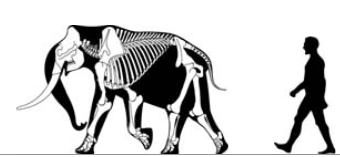
Skeletal restoration of the pygmy mammoth (Mammuthus exilis) showing size compared to a human

A population of the Columbian mammoth (Mammuthus columbi) arrived on the northern Channel Islands of California during the late Middle Pleistocene, around 250-150,000 years ago, giving rise to a dwarfed species, the pygmy mammoth (Mammuthus exilis). Channel Islands mammoths ranged from 150–190 cm (59–75 in) in shoulder height. These mammoths became extinct around 13,000 years ago, around the time of arrival of modern humans to the islands.

== Indonesia and the Philippines ==
In Indonesia and the Philippines, evidence of a succession of distinct endemic island faunas has been found, including dwarfed elephants and species of Stegodon.

=== Flores ===
Size comparison of dwarf Flores Stegodon species compared to a human. (Note: silhouette is based on much larger S. zdanskyi and is not meant to accurately depict the specific body proportions of these species)

During the late Early Pleistocene, Flores was inhabited by the dwarf species Stegodon sondaarii, around 15% of the size of mainland Stegodon species, which was around 120 cm (3.9 ft) tall at the shoulder and weighed about 350–400 kilograms (770–880 lb). This species became extinct around 1 million years ago, being replaced by Stegodon florensis. Stegodon florensis shows a progressive size reduction with time, with the earlier Middle Pleistocene subspecies Stegodon florensis florensis estimated to be around 50% the size of mainland Stegodon species with a shoulder height of around 190 cm (6.2 ft) and a body mass of around 1.7 tons, while the later Stegodon florensis insularis from the Late Pleistocene is estimated to be around 17% the size of mainland Stegodon species, with a shoulder height of around 130 cm (4.3 ft), and a body mass of about 570 kilograms (1,260 lb) Stegodon florensis became extinct about 50,000 years ago, around the time of the arrival of modern humans to Flores.

=== Sulawesi ===
During the Late Pliocene-Early Pleistocene on Sulawesi, two species of dwarf proboscidean coinhabited the island, the elephant Stegoloxodon celebensis, and Stegodon sompoensis. The former was about 150 cm (4.9 ft) tall, while the latter was around 32% the size of mainland Stegodon species, with an estimated body mass of about a ton. Later in the Pleistocene, these animals were replaced by larger-sized species of Stegodon and elephants, with an indeterminate Stegodon species from the Middle Pleistocene of Sulawesi being around 57% the size of mainland species, with an estimated bodymass of about 2 tons.

=== Java ===
The species Stegodon trigonocephalus is known from the Early-Middle Pleistocene of Java. A population from the Trinil H.K locality, which likely dates to the Middle Pleistocene, is around 65% the size of mainland Stegodon species. Large individuals are estimated to have reached around 280 cm (9.2 ft) at the shoulders, with a body mass of around 5 tons. Other smaller unnamed Stegodon species are also known from the Early Pleistocene on the island. The extinct dwarf elephant species Stegoloxodon indonesicus is also known from the Early Pleistocene of Java, which is probably closely related to S. celebensis from Sulawesi, but whose relationships to other elephants are obscure.

=== Sumba ===
The species Stegodon sumbaensis of an uncertain Middle-Late Pleistocene age from Sumba is one of the smallest known species, at around 8% of the size of its mainland ancestor, with an estimated body mass of around 250 kilograms (550 lb).

=== Timor ===
The species Stegodon timorensis is known from the Middle Pleistocene of Timor. It is a small-sized species, only slightly larger than S. sondaarii, and around 23% the size of mainland species, with an estimated body mass of around 770 kilograms (1,700 lb).

=== Luzon ===
On Luzon the dwarf Stegodon luzonensis is known from remains found in the Manila Basin of an uncertain Pleistocene age, as well as remains found near the early Middle Pleistocene Nesorhinus butchery site dating to around 700,000 years ago. It is around 40% the size of mainland Stegodon species, with a body mass of around 1.3 tons. Though the temporal span of Stegodon on Luzon is not well constrained due to the limited number of finds, remains are suggested to span from at least around 1-0.8 million years ago to around 400,000 years ago. The extinct reputed dwarf elephant Elephas beyeri is also known from the island of an unknown (probably Pleistocene) age, which is estimated to have been about 1.2 metres (3.9 ft) in shoulder height, though later analysis suggested that the only known remains, a lost cheek tooth, may represent a juvenile milk tooth, which would bring the dwarf status into doubt. Other Elephas remains of Pleistocene age are known from Luzon, but these are non-dwarfs comparable in size to living Asian elephants.

=== Mindanao ===
On the island of Mindanao, the dwarf Stegodon species Stegodon mindanensis was present at some point in the Pleistocene. It has an estimated body mass of around 400 kilograms (880 lb).

== Japan ==
Some species of the stegodontid Stegolophodon from the Middle Miocene of Japan around 16 million years ago have been suggested to exhibit insular dwarfism, appearing to exhibit size reduction over time, which would make them the oldest known proboscideans to do so.

During Pliocene-Early Pleistocene (from around 4-1 million years ago), a succession of endemic dwarf species of Stegodon, probably representing a single lineage lived in the Japanese archipelago, probably derived from the mainland Chinese S. zydanskyi. In chronological succession these species are Stegodon miensis (4-3 million years ago) Stegodon protoaurorae (3-2 million years ago) and Stegodon aurorae, (2-1 million years ago) which show a progressive size reduction through time, possibly as a result of reducing land area of the Japanese archipelago. The latest and smallest species S. aurorae is estimated to be 25% the size of its mainland ancestor with a body mass of around 2,122 kilograms (4,678 lb).

During the late Middle Pleistocene to Late Pleistocene around 330,000-24,000 years ago, the Japanese archipelago was inhabited by the elephant species Palaeoloxodon naumanni. This species was only modestly dwarfed compared to its large continental ancestor, having a reconstructed shoulder height of 2.4–2.8 metres (7.9–9.2 ft), for males and around 2 metres (6.6 ft) for females.

== Wrangel Island ==
During the Holocene, woolly mammoths (Mammuthus primigenius) lived on Wrangel Island in the Arctic Ocean, surviving thousands of years after the extinction of mainland woolly mammoths until around 2000 BCE, the most recent survival of any known mammoth population. Wrangel Island is thought to have become separated from the mainland by 12000 BCE. It was assumed that Wrangel Island mammoths ranged from 180–230 cm (71–91 in) in shoulder height and were for a time considered "dwarf mammoths". However this classification has been re-evaluated and since the Second International Mammoth Conference in 1999, these mammoths are no longer considered to be true "dwarf mammoths", as their size falls within the range of that of mainland Siberian woolly mammoths.

== Factors influencing dwarfism ==
The factors influencing dwarfism of proboscideans have been considered complex and particular to each island, though resource limitation has been considered to be a likely major driver on all islands. Length of isolation has been considered an important factor, with dwarf proboscideans isolated for longer generally being smaller than those isolated for a more brief period of time. Distance from the mainland beyond the minimum distance of around 10 kilometres (6.2 mi) required for speciation is suggested to not be an important factor, at least directly. Island area is only weakly correlated with body size. Competition with other herbivores is suggested to be important factor, resulting in a reduced level of dwarfism where they are present. The effect of the presence of large carnivores is unclear, but is suggested to depend on the diversity of the carnivore guild.

== See also ==
- Borneo elephant
