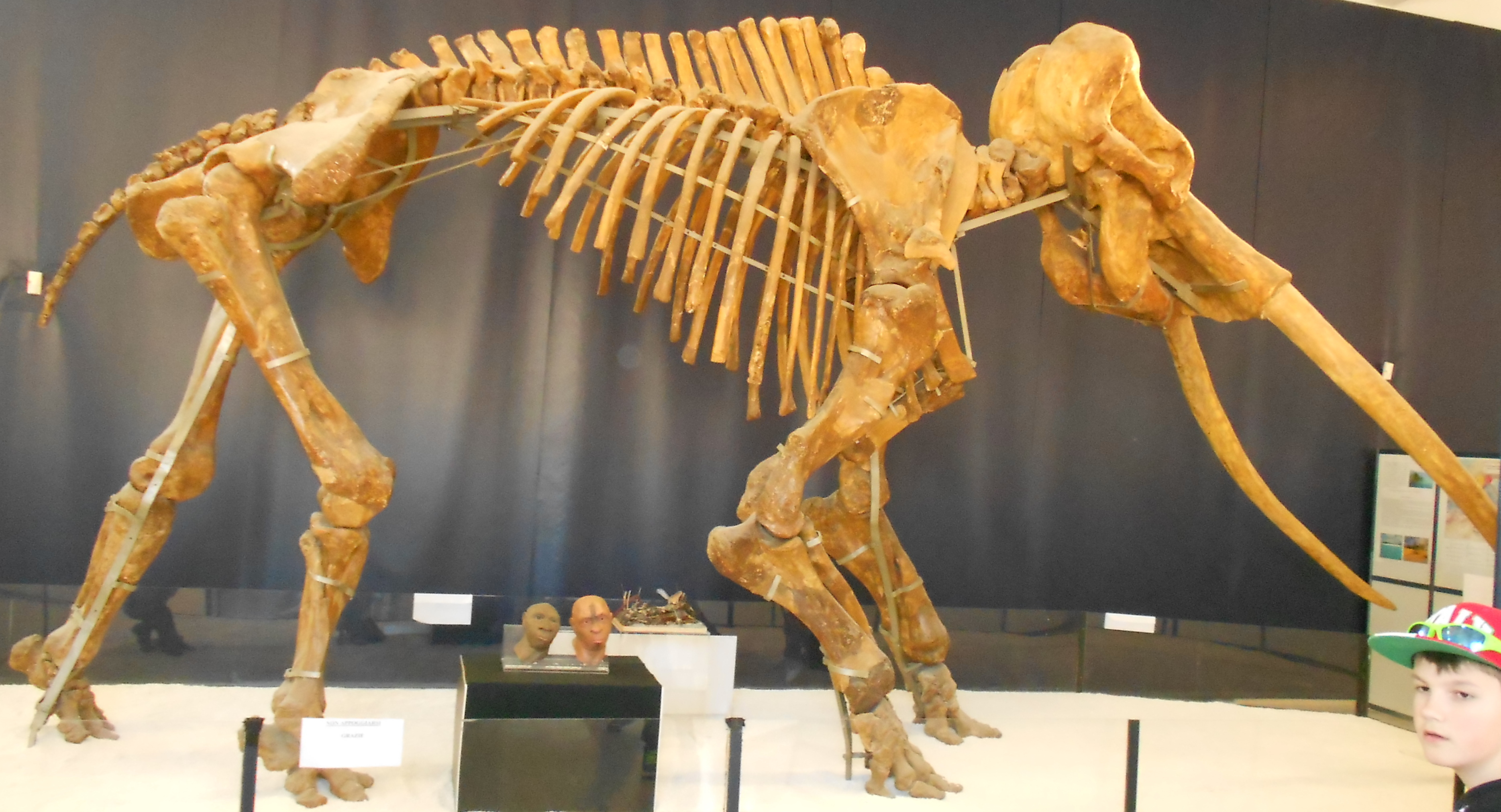
- Skeleton
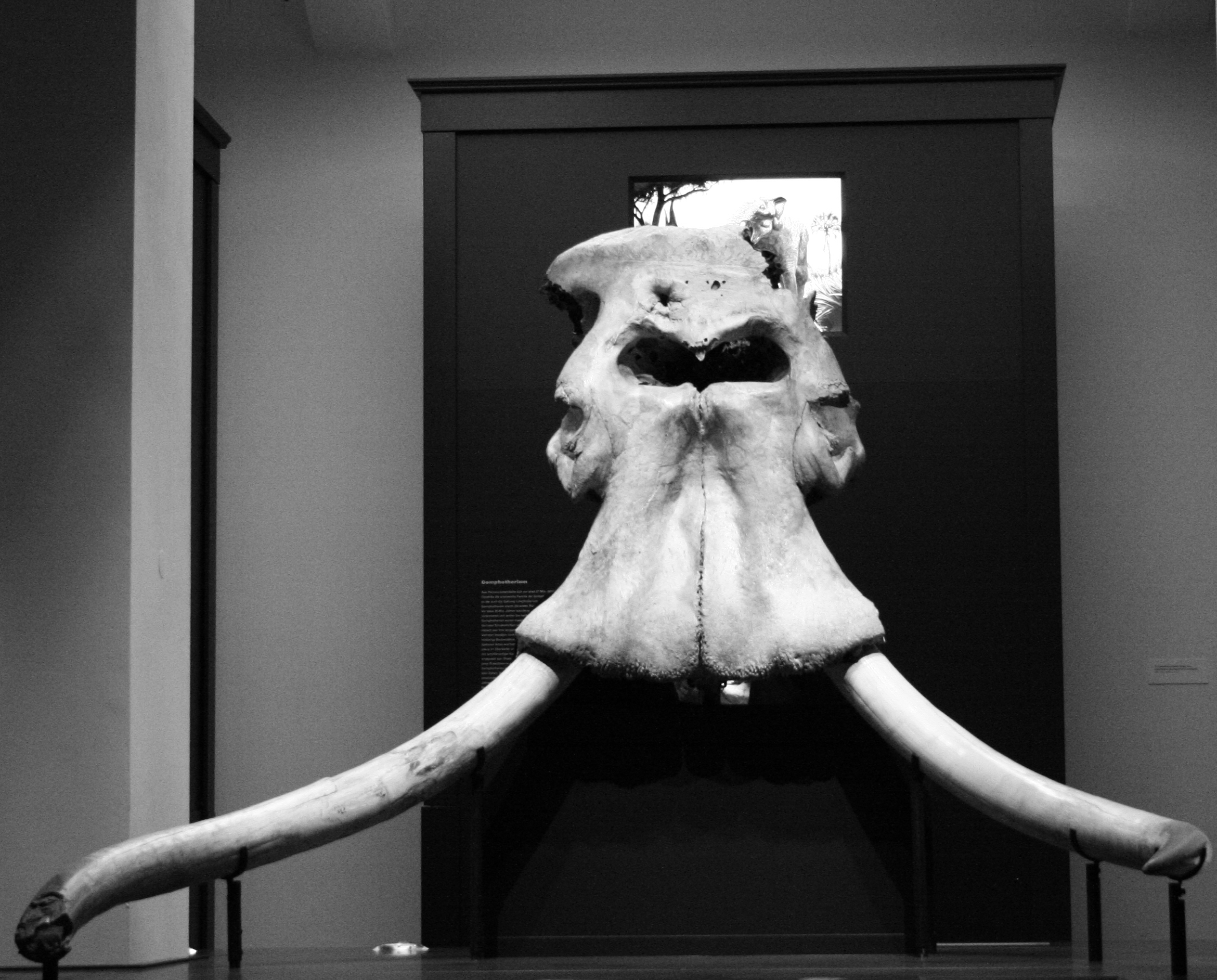
- Skull in front-on view

Scientific classification
- Kingdom: Animalia
- Phylum: Chordata
- Class: Mammalia
- Order: Proboscidea
- Family: Elephantidae
- Genus: †Palaeoloxodon
- Species: †P. antiquus

Binomial name
- †Palaeoloxodon antiquus (Falconer & Cautley, 1847)
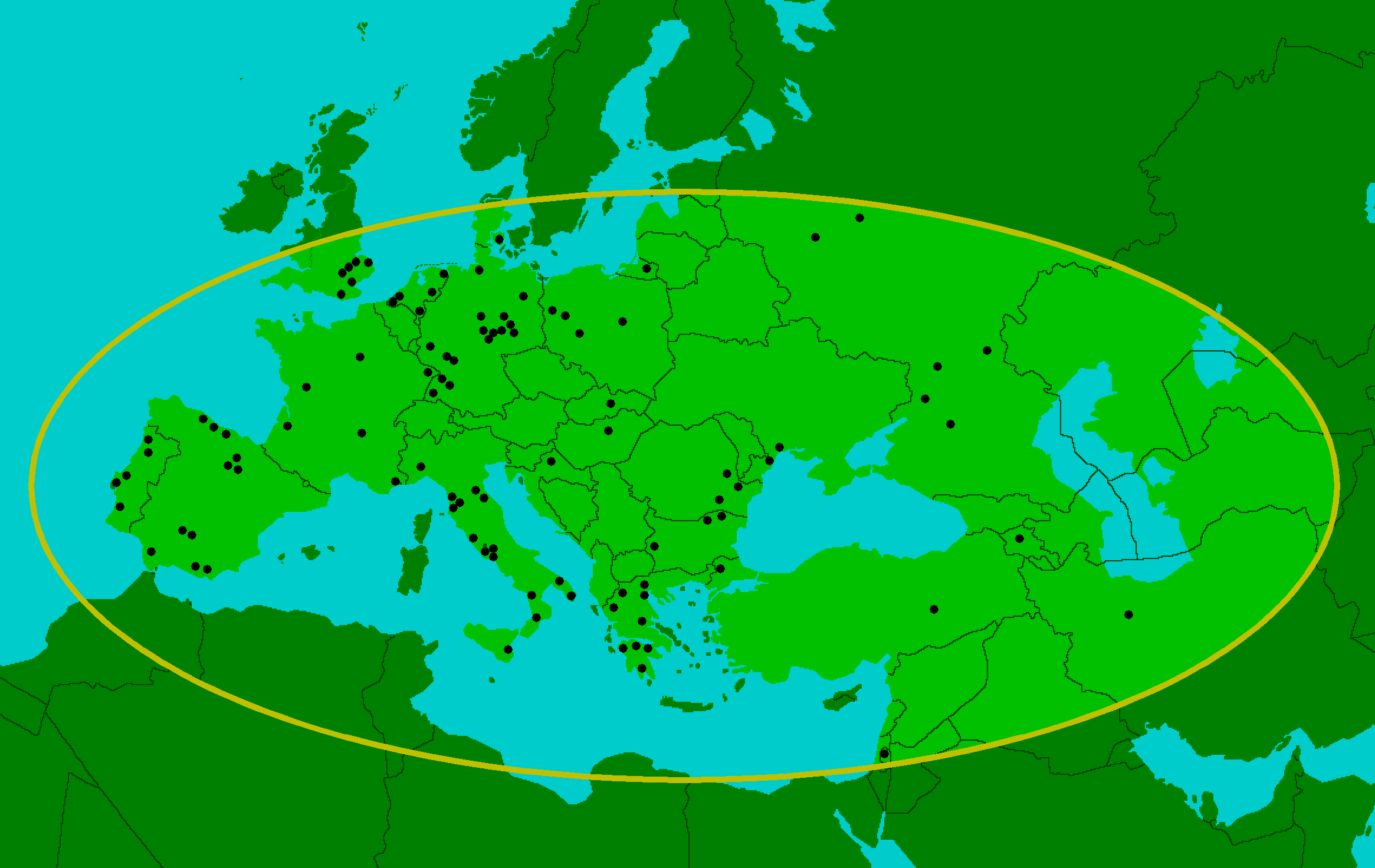
- Approximate range of P. antiquus

Synonyms
- List: Elephas antiquus (Falconer & Cautley, 1847); Elephas (Euelephas) antiquus (Falconer & Cautley, 1847); Elephas [Elephas] (Loxodon) priscus (Goldfuss) (Falconer, 1857); Elephas [Elephas] (Euelephas) antiquus (Falconer, 1857); Elephas Loxodon priscus Falconer, 1868; Elephas Ausonius Major, 1875; Elephas (Euelephas) antiquus var. nana Acconi, 1880; Leptodon giganteus Gunn, 1883; Elephas Gunnii Lartet, 1883; Leptodon minor Gunn, 1883; Elephas platyrhychus Gunn, 1883 and Gurells, 1897; Leptodon giganteus Gunn, 1883; Elephas (Elephas) antiquus var. minor Pohlig, 1887; Elephas (Elephas) giganteus intermedius Pohlig, 1887; Elephas meridionalis antiquitatis Portis, 1896; Elephas antiquus var. insularis Pohlig, 1887; Elephas antiquus germanicus Stefanescu, 1924; Palaeoloxodon antiquus italicus Osborn, 1924; Palaeoloxodon antiquus (andrewsii) Osborn, 1924; Hesperoloxodon antiquus Osborn, 1934; Hesperoloxodon antiquus germanicus Osborn, 1934; Hesperoloxodon antiquus italicus Osborn, 1934; Elephas (Elephas) antiquus ruthenensis Astre, 1937; Palaeoloxodon meridionaloides? Dubrovo, 1994; Loxodonta antiquus; Elephas (Palaeoloxodon) cephallonicus Theodorou et al. 2018; Palaeoloxodon huaihoensis? Liu, 1977

= Straight-tusked elephant =

Straight-tusked elephant Temporal range: Middle-Late Pleistocene ~0.8–0.03 Ma

Extinct species of elephant native to Europe and West Asia

The straight-tusked elephant (Palaeoloxodon antiquus) is an extinct species of elephant that inhabited Europe and Western Asia during the Middle and Late Pleistocene. One of the largest known elephant species, mature fully grown bulls on average had a shoulder height of 4 metres (13 ft) and a weight of 13 tonnes (29,000 lb), placing them among the largest land mammals ever. Straight-tusked elephants likely lived very similarly to modern elephants, with herds of adult females and juveniles and solitary adult males. The species was primarily associated with temperate and Mediterranean woodland and forest habitats, flourishing during interglacial periods, when its range would extend across Europe as far north as Great Britain and Denmark and eastwards into Russia, while persisting in southern Europe during glacial periods, when northern Europe was occupied by steppe mammoths and later woolly mammoths. Skeletons with cut marks and/or found in association with stone tools and in one case, a wooden spear, suggest they were scavenged and hunted by early humans, including Homo heidelbergensis and their Neanderthal successors.

The species is part of the genus Palaeoloxodon (whose other members are also sometimes called straight-tusked elephants), which emerged in Africa during the Early Pleistocene, before dispersing across Eurasia at the beginning of the Middle Pleistocene, with the earliest record of Palaeoloxodon in Europe dated to around 800–700,000 years ago, around the time of the extinction of the previously dominant mammoth species Mammuthus meridionalis. The straight-tusked elephant is the ancestor of over half a dozen named (and several more unnamed) species of dwarf elephants that inhabited islands in the Mediterranean, some of which shrank to only 2% the size of their mainland ancestor. The straight-tusked elephant became extinct during the latter half of the Last Glacial Period, with the youngest remains found in the Iberian Peninsula, dating to around 44,000 years ago. Possible even younger records include a single tooth from the Netherlands that has been dated to around 37,000 years ago, and footprints from the southern part of the Iberian Peninsula dated to 28,000 years ago.

== Description ==
=== Anatomy ===
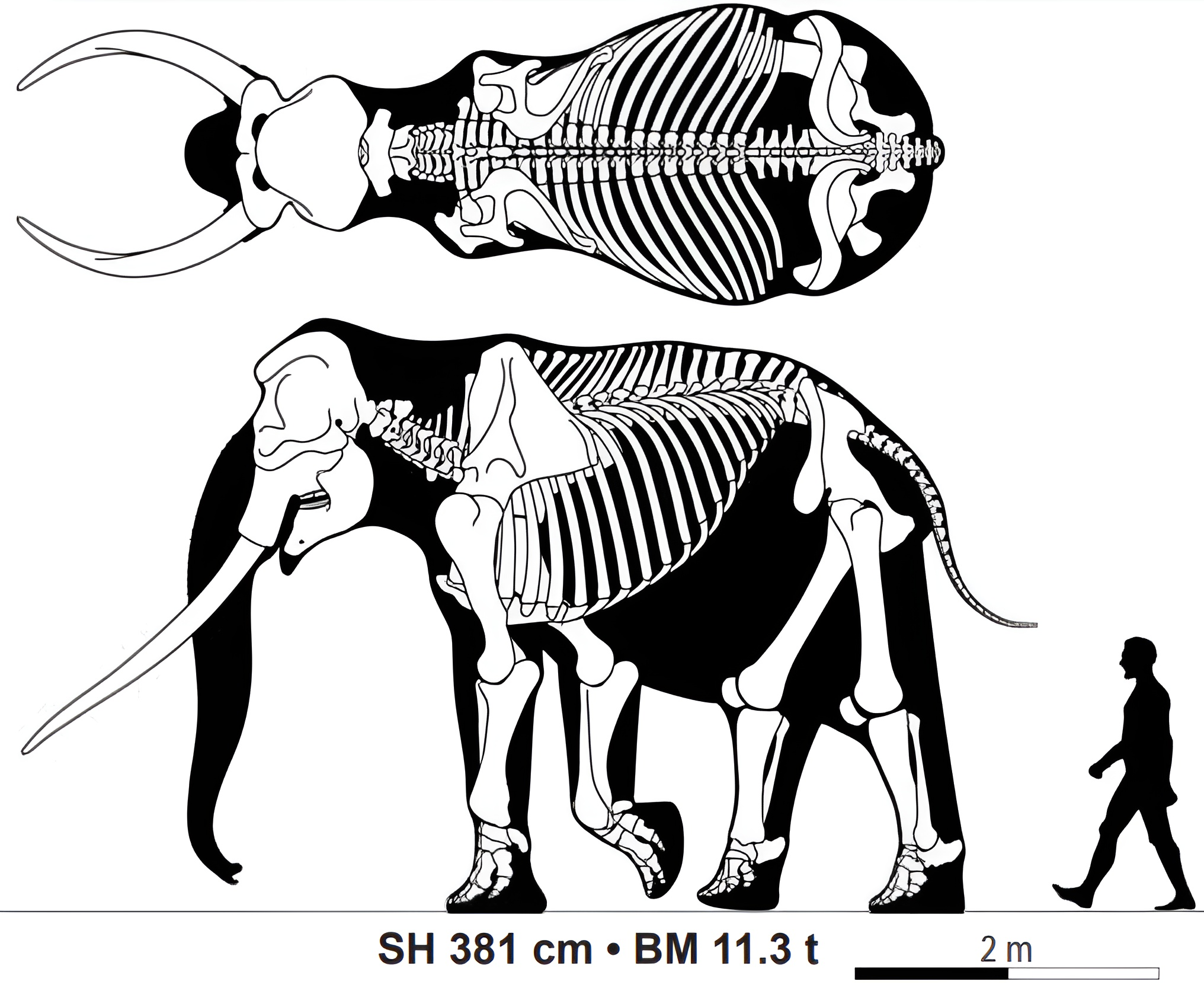
Skeletal diagram of a 3.81 metres (12.5 ft) tall 40 year old male straight-tusked elephant compared to a 1.8 metres (5 ft 11 in) tall human

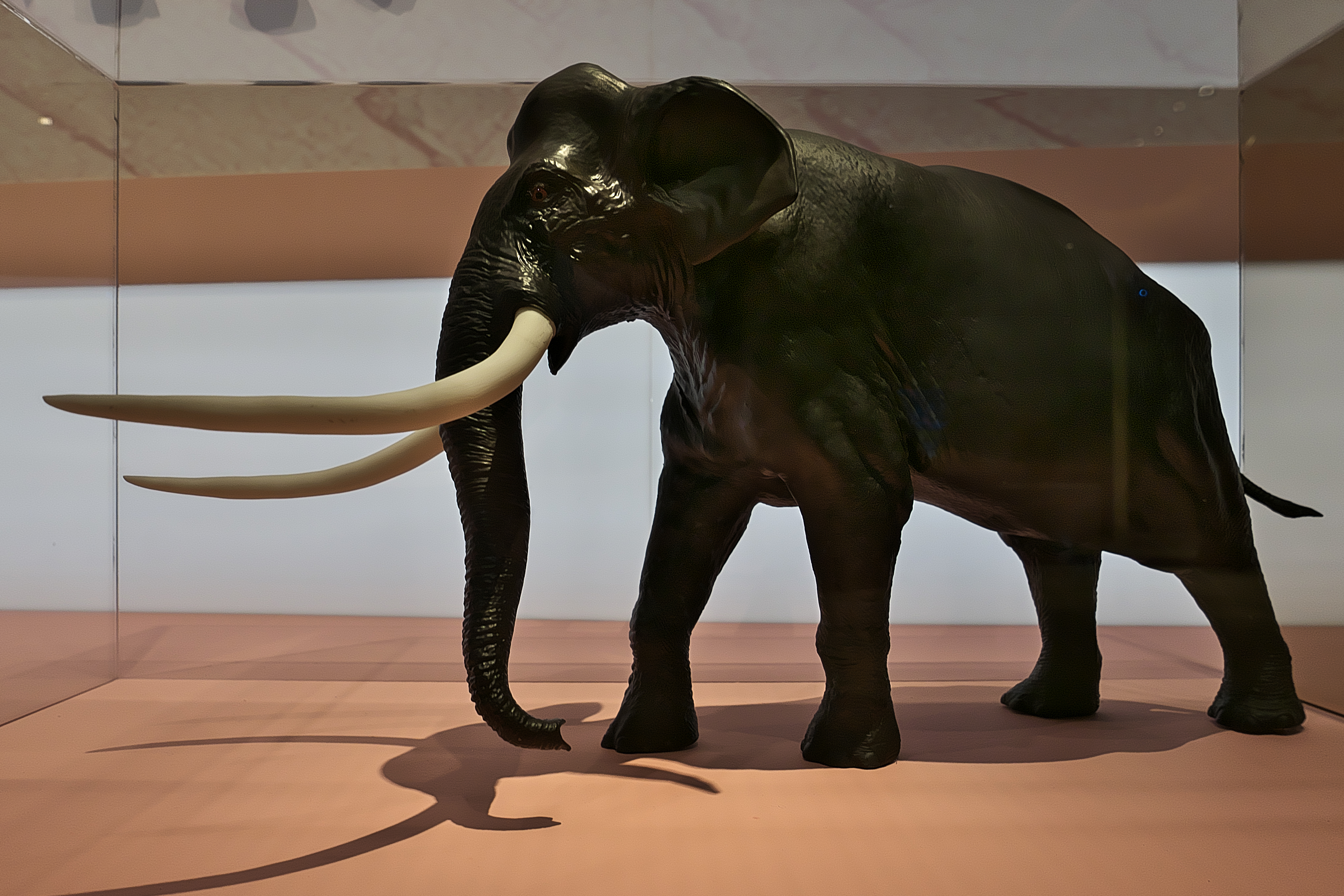
Model of a straight-tusked elephant

The body, including the pelvis, of P. antiquus was broad relative to extant elephants. The forelimbs, particularly the humerus, and the scapula are proportionally longer than those of living elephants, resulting in a high position of the shoulder. The head represents the highest point of the animal, with the back being somewhat sloped though irregular in shape. The spines of the back vertebrae are noticeably elongate. The tail was relatively long. Although not preserved, the body was probably only sparsely covered in hair, similar to extant elephants, and probably had relatively large ears.

The skull is proportionally both very wide and tall. Like many other members of the genus Palaeoloxodon, P. antiquus possesses a well-developed growth of bone at the top of the cranium above the nasal opening called the parieto-occipital crest, originating from the occipital bone of the skull roof which projects forwards and overhangs the rest of the skull. The crest was probably an anchor for muscles, including the splenius, as well as an additional muscle layer that wrapped around the top of the head, called the "extra splenius". The latter was likely similar to the "splenius superficialis" found in Asian elephants. The crest likely developed to support the very large size of the head, as the skulls of Palaeoloxodon are the largest proportionally and in absolute size among proboscideans. Two morphs of P. antiquus were previously thought to exist in Europe on the basis of differences in the parieto-occipital crest, one more similar to the South Asian Palaeoloxodon namadicus. These differences were shown to be age-related (ontogenetic variation), with the crest being more pronounced in older individuals, as well as due to distortion during fossilisation (taphonomic variation). P. antiquus differs from P. namadicus in having a less stout cranium and more robust limb bones, and in lacking a teardrop-shaped indentation behind the eye socket (infraorbital depression). The premaxillary bones (which contain the tusks) are fan-shaped and very broad in front view. The tusks are very long relative to the size of the body and vary from straight to slightly curved. The teeth are high crowned (hypsodont), with each third molar having approximately 16–21 lamellae (ridges). As is typical for elephantids, the morphology of the limb bones is undistinctive and difficult to tell apart from other elephantids like mammoths.

=== Size ===
Size diagram of P. antiquus compared to humans, showing an average sized male (dark yellow) and female (purple) and estimated size of the largest known specimens (transparent yellow)

The species was sexually dimorphic, with males being substantially larger than females; this size dimorphism was more pronounced than in living elephants. P. antiquus was on average considerably larger than any living elephant, and among the largest known land mammals to have ever lived. Under optimal conditions where individuals were capable of reaching full growth potential, 90% of mature fully grown straight-tusked elephant bulls are estimated to have had shoulder heights in the region of 3.8–4.2 m (12 ft 6 in – 13 ft 9 in) and a weight between 10.8–15 tonnes (24,000–33,000 lb). For comparison, 90% of mature fully grown bulls of the largest living elephant species, the African bush elephant under optimal growth conditions have heights between 3.04 to 3.36 metres (10.0 to 11.0 ft) and masses between 5.2–6.9 tonnes (11,000–15,000 lb). Extremely large bulls, such as those represented by a now lost pelvis and tibia collected from the Iberian Peninsula (including the San Isidro del Campo site in Spain) in the 19th century, may have reached shoulder heights of 4.6 m (15 ft 1 in) and body masses of over 19 tonnes (42,000 lb), exceeding the body mass estimated for the largest specimens of Paraceratherium transouralicum, the otherwise largest known land mammal. Adult males had tusks typically around 3.5–4 metres (11–13 ft) long, with masses comfortably exceeding 100 kilograms (220 lb). The preserved portion of one particularly large and thick tusk from Aniene, Italy, is 3.9 metres (13 ft) in length, has a circumference of around 77 centimetres (30 in) where it would have exited the skull, and is estimated to have weighed over 190 kilograms (420 lb) in life.

Females were considerably larger than living female elephants and comparable in size with African bush elephant bulls, with female individuals from the Neumark Nord population in Germany reaching shoulder heights and weights rarely exceeding 3 metres (9.8 ft) and 5.5 tonnes (12,000 lb) respectively (though several relatively young females at the site would likely have exceeded this size when fully grown). A particularly large female known from a pelvis found near Binsfeld in Germany has been estimated to have had a shoulder height of 3.3 metres (10.8 ft) and a weight of 7.5 tonnes (17,000 lb). For comparison, 90% of fully grown female African bush elephants reach a shoulder height of 2.47 to 2.75 metres (8.1 to 9.0 ft) and body mass of 2.6 to 3.5 tonnes (5,700 to 7,700 lb) under optimal growth conditions. Newborn and young calves were likely around the same size as those of modern elephants. A largely complete 5-year-old calf from Cova del Rinoceront in Spain was estimated to have a shoulder height of 178–187 centimetres (5.8–6.1 ft) and a body mass of 1.45–1.5 tonnes (3,200–3,300 lb), which is comparable to a similarly-aged African bush elephant.

== History of discovery, taxonomy and evolution ==
=== Early finds and research history ===
In the second century AD, the Greek geographer Pausanias remarked that the Megalopolis region in the central part of the Peloponnese peninsula in southern Greece was known for its enormous bones, which Pausanias reported were considered by some to be those of giants who died during the Gigantomachy, a mythic climactic battle between the giants and the Greek gods. Given that this region is today known for its straight-tusked elephant fossils, it is plausible that at least some of the giant bones to which Pausanias referred were those of straight-tusked elephants.

In 1695, remains of a straight-tusked elephant were collected from travertine deposits near Burgtonna in what is now Thuringia, Germany. While these remains were declared to be purely mineral in nature by the Collegium Medicum in the nearby city of Gotha, this was disputed by Wilhelm Ernst Tentzel, a polymath in the employ of the ducal court of Saxe-Gotha-Altenburg, who correctly identified them as elephant remains, which he assumed were deposited by the biblical deluge. The controversy became the subject of widespread discussion among contemporary scholars in Europe. A century later, the Burgtonna skeleton was one of the specimens on which Johann Friedrich Blumenbach based his description of the woolly mammoth (Mammuthus primigenius, originally Elephas primigenius) in his publication naming the species in 1799. The remains of straight-tusked elephants continued to be attributed to woolly mammoths until the 1840s.^{40}

The straight-tusked elephant was named scientifically in 1847 by British palaeontologists Hugh Falconer and Proby Cautley as Elephas (Euelephas) antiquus.^{40-41} The type specimen is a mandible (lower jaw) with a second molar (M2006). The exact provenance of the specimen is unknown, though it probably originates from Britain, and possibly the site of Grays in Essex, southeast England. This specimen was originally considered to be that of a mammoth, and the attribution to E. antiquus was made in a hand-written correction.^{40} The common name "straight-tusked elephant" was used for the species as early as 1873 by William Boyd Dawkins. In 1924, the Japanese paleontologist Matsumoto Hikoshichirō assigned E. antiquus to his new taxon Palaeoloxodon, which he classified as a subgenus of Loxodonta (which includes the living African elephants).^{40} The species has a confused taxonomic history, with at least 21 named synonyms.^{41} In publications in the 1930s and 1940s (the latter published posthumously), Henry Fairfield Osborn assigned the species to its own genus Hesperoloxodon, which was followed by some later authors, but is now rejected.^{42} In his widely cited 1973 work, Origin and evolution of the Elephantidae, Vincent J. Maglio sunk P. antiquus into the South Asian P. namadicus, as well as Palaeoloxodon back into Elephas (which contains the living Asian elephant). While the sinking of Palaeoloxodon into Elephas (with Palaeoloxodon sometimes being treated as a subgenus of Elephas) gained considerable traction in the following decades, today both P. antiquus and Palaeoloxodon are considered distinct.

=== DNA analysis ===
Phylogeny showing the placement of Palaeoloxodon antiquus in relation to other elephantids based on nuclear genomes, after Palkopoulou et al. 2018, demonstrating that Palaeoloxodon antiquus received substantial introgression of DNA as a result of hybridization with African forest elephants, and to a lesser extent mammoths. Mitochondrial DNA suggests that this hybrid ancestry is widespread in Eurasian Palaeoloxodon species, with the hybridization likely occurring in their African ancestor P. recki.

During the late 20th century and the first decade of the 21st century, Palaeoloxodon species were thought to share a close common ancestry with Asian elephants and other species of Elephas, which was based on a number of morphological similarities between the two groups. In 2016, a mitochondrial DNA sequence analysis instead found that the mitochondrial genome of P. antiquus was nested within those of the African forest elephant (Loxodonta cyclotis), with analysis of a partial nuclear genome supporting a closer relationship to L. cyclotis than to the African bush elephant (L. africana). A subsequent study published in 2018 that includes some of the same authors presented a complete nuclear genome sequence, indicating a more complicated relationship between straight-tusked elephants and other species of elephants. According to this study, the lineage of Palaeoloxodon antiquus was the result of reticulate evolution, with the majority of the genome of straight-tusked elephants deriving from a lineage of elephants that was more closely related to modern African elephants than to Asian elephants or mammoths, but diverged prior to the split between African forest and bush elephants (~60% of total genomic contribution), which had significant introgressed ancestry resulting from hybridisation with African forest elephants (>33%) and to a lesser extent from mammoths (~5%). The African forest elephant ancestry was more closely related to modern West African forest elephants than to other African forest elephant populations. This hybridisation likely occurred in Africa, prior to migration of Palaeoloxodon into Eurasia, likely beginning around or prior to 1 million years ago in the case of the African forest elephant hybridisation, and appears to be shared with other Palaeoloxodon populations, such as Chinese Palaeoloxodon, as well as Palaeoloxodon naumanni from Japan.

=== Evolution ===
Like other Eurasian Palaeoloxodon species, P. antiquus is believed to derive from the migration of a population of Palaeoloxodon recki out of Africa, suggested to have occurred around 800,000 years ago, approximately at the boundary between the Early Pleistocene and Middle Pleistocene. P. antiquus first appeared during the Middle Pleistocene, with the earliest record of Palaeoloxodon in Europe being from the Slivia site in Italy, dating to around 800–700,000 years ago. Its earliest known appearance in northern Europe is in England around 600,000 years ago. The arrival of Palaeoloxodon in Europe coincided with the extinction of the temperate-adapted European mammoth species Mammuthus meridionalis and the migration of Mammuthus trogontherii (the steppe mammoth) into Europe from Asia. The arrival of Palaeoloxodon in Europe was part of a larger faunal turnover event around the transition between the Early and Middle Pleistocene, where many European mammal species that characterised the preceding late Villafranchian became extinct, along with the dispersal of immigrant species into Europe from Asia and Africa.

There appears to be no overlap between M. meridionalis and P. antiquus, which suggests that the latter might have outcompeted the former. During P. antiquus's hundreds of thousands of years of existence, its tooth morphology remained relatively static, unlike European mammoth populations.

==== Dwarfed descendants ====
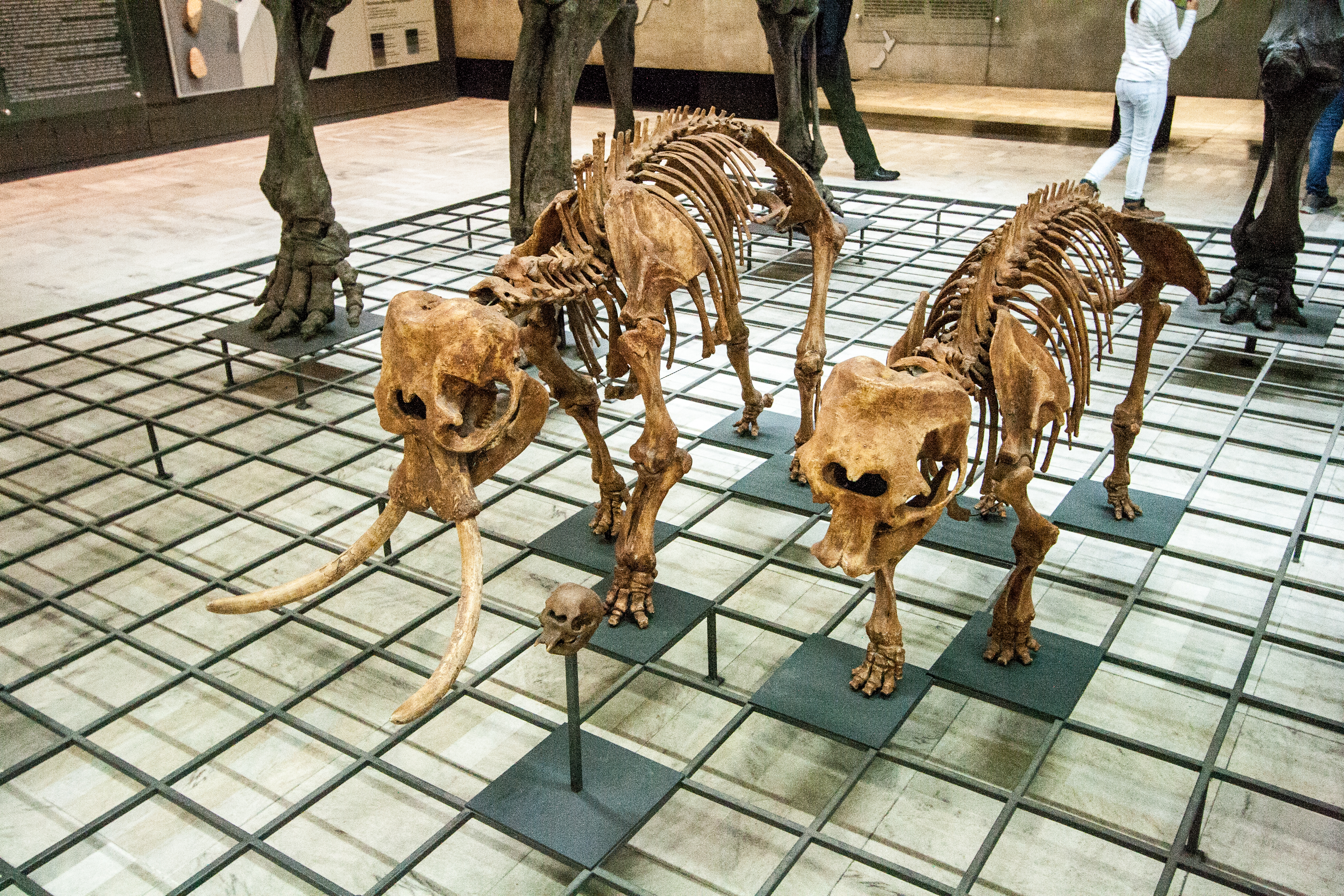
Skeletons of Palaeoloxodon falconeri a sheep-sized dwarf elephant species thought to have descended from the straight-tusked elephant native to Sicily and Malta

Over half a dozen species of dwarf elephants that are thought to have evolved from the straight-tusked elephant are known from many Mediterranean islands, spanning from Sicily and Malta in the west to Cyprus in the east. Some of these dwarf elephants, such as Palaeoloxodon falconeri and Palaeoloxodon cypriotes, were only a small fraction of the size of the straight-tusked elephant, 2% of the straight-tusked elephant's body mass (around 150–250 kilograms (330–550 lb) in the case of P. falconeri) and around 1 metre (3 ft 3 in) in shoulder height. The responsible factors for the dwarfing of animals on islands are thought to include the reduction in food availability, predation and competition from other herbivores.

== Distribution and habitat ==
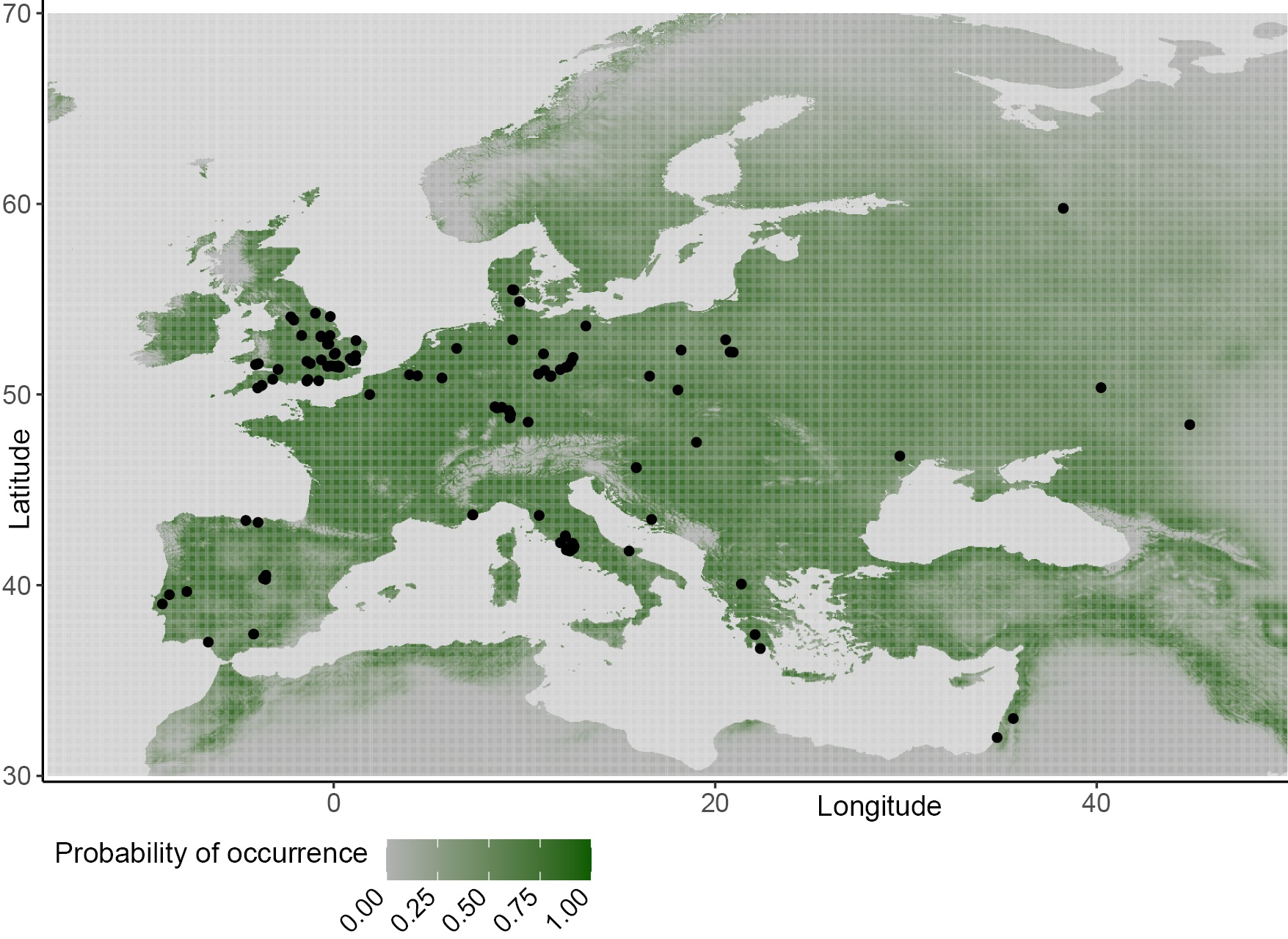
Estimated suitable, but not necessarily occupied, habitat for straight-tusked elephants in Europe and West Asia during interglacial periods, with dots showing some (but not a comprehensive record of) find locations.

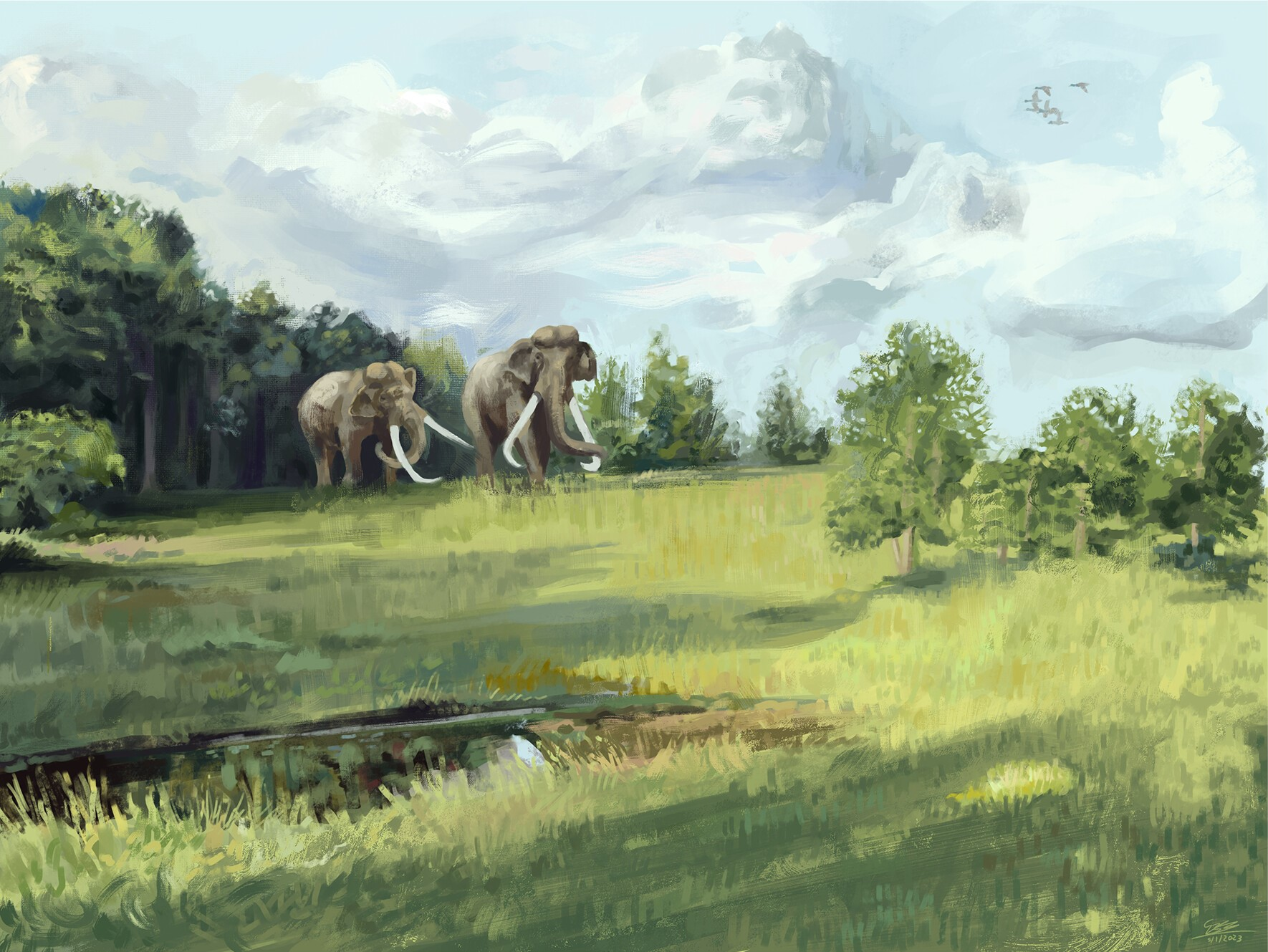
Life restoration of two straight-tusked elephants during the Last Interglacial in a temperate forest landscape.

Palaeoloxodon antiquus is known from abundant finds across Europe, reaching its widest distribution on the continent during warm interglacial periods. Fossils are also known from Israel, western Iran and probably Turkey in West Asia. Some remains of the species have also been reported from Central Asia in northeastern Kazakhstan and Tajikistan, as well as rare records from adjacent areas of southwest Siberia. Outside of Eastern Europe, the northernmost records of the species are known from Great Britain, Denmark and Poland, around the 55th parallel north. Some of the northernmost reported fossils of the species are from the banks of the Kolva river in the Russian Urals at around the 60th parallel north. During glacial periods P. antiquus permanently resided in the Mediterranean region. Many of the West Asian remains have been assigned to the species primarily on the basis of geography, and it has been suggested that some of these, such as those from Israel, actually belong to P. recki. A 2004 study attributed the holotype of Palaeoloxodon turkmenicus, a skull found in western Turkmenistan, to P. antiquus, but later analysis found that P. turkmenicus represented a morphologically distinct and valid species. During the 2020s, some authors began to suggest that Palaeoloxodon remains from China (otherwise assigned to, among others, the species Palaeoloxodon huaihoensis) may represent P. antiquus. The straight-tusked elephant is primarily associated with temperate and Mediterranean forest and woodland habitats, as opposed to the colder open steppe environments inhabited by contemporary mammoths, though the species is also known to have inhabited open grasslands, and is thought to have been tolerant of a range of environmental conditions.

== Behaviour and paleoecology ==
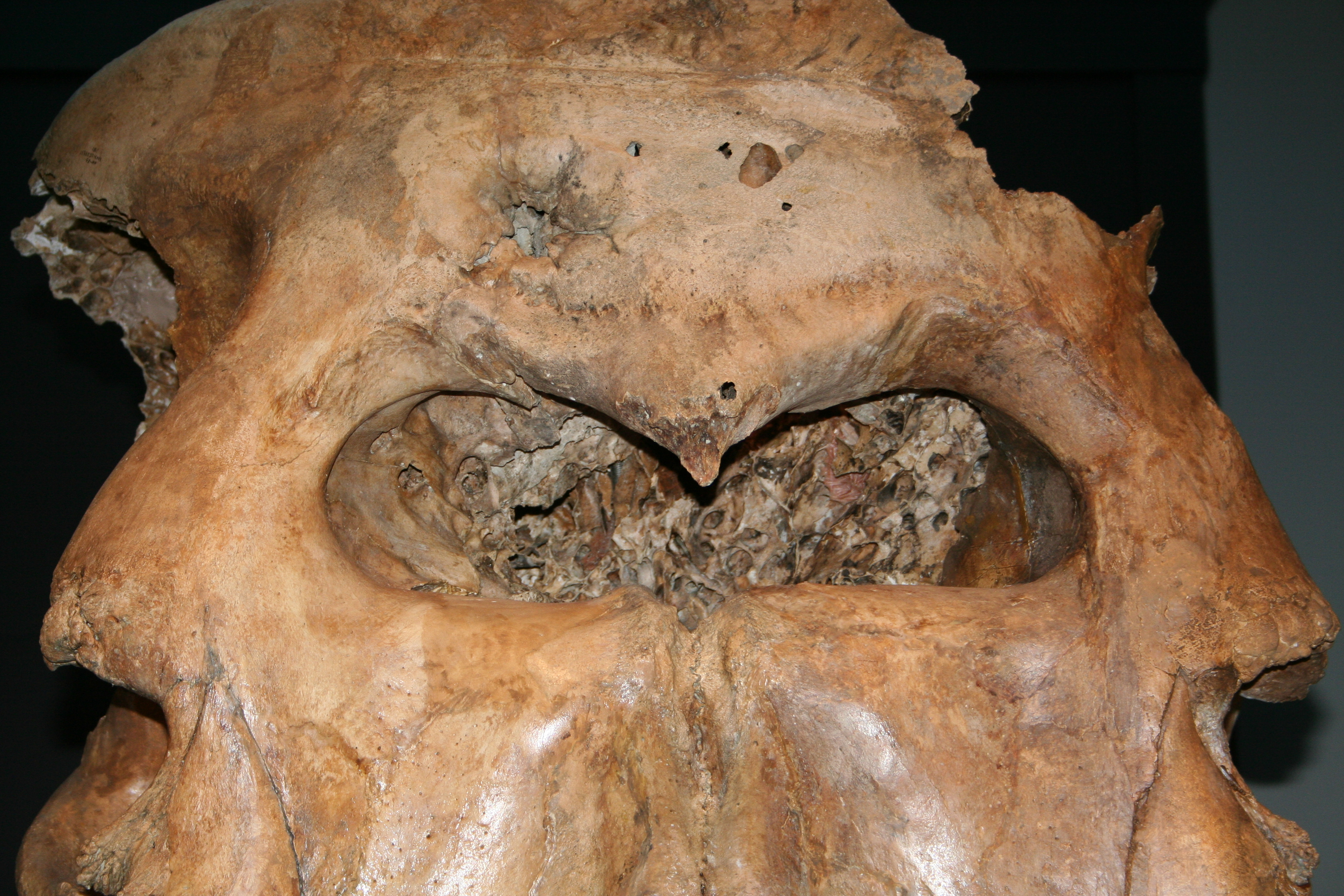
Closeup of a skull of a straight-tusked elephant bull from Neumark Nord, Germany, which has a healed puncture hole wound in its forehead (centre left), which may have been the result of a fight with a rival male

As with modern elephants, female and juvenile straight-tusked elephants are thought to have lived in matriarchal (female-led) herds of related individuals, with males leaving these groups to live solitarily upon reaching adolescence around 14–15 years of age. Adult males likely sometimes engaged in combat with each other during musth similar to living elephants. Some straight-tusked elephant specimens appear to document injuries obtained in fights with conspecifics; particularly notable specimens include a large male specimen from Neumark Nord that has a deep puncture hole wound in its forehead with surrounding bone growth indicating that it had healed, as well as another large male from the same locality with a healed puncture hole wound in its scapula.

Like modern elephants, the herds would have been restricted to areas with available fresh water due to the greater hydration needs and lower mobility of the juveniles. Fossil tracks of newborns, calves and adults, which are likely of a herd of P. antiquus, have been found in dune deposits in southern Spain, dating to the early Late Pleistocene (Marine Isotope Stage (MIS) 5, around 130–80,000 years ago). Some straight-tusked elephant populations may have engaged in seasonal migrations, as occurs in living elephants. Strontium isotope analysis of two male tooth specimens from Neumark Nord in Germany indicate that over the 8 years preserved by the teeth, these individuals had spent part of their lives considerably distant from the site, perhaps as far as 300 kilometres (190 mi) away from Neumark Nord where they eventually died, while another analysed male and a female remained relatively local to the Neumark Nord area during the period of tooth growth.

Due to their larger size, straight-tusked elephants are thought to have finished growing 10 to 15 years later than living elephants, continuing to grow after 50 years of age in males, and to around 40 years of age in females, the latter comparable to the growth period of African bush elephant bulls. They may also have lived longer than extant elephants, with lifespans perhaps in excess of 80 years.

Dental microwear studies suggest that the diet of P. antiquus was highly variable, ranging from almost completely grazing to almost completely browsing (feeding on leaves, stems and fruits of high-growing plants). However, microwear only reflects the diet in the last few days or weeks before death, so the observed dietary variation may be seasonal, as is the case with living elephants. Isotopic analysis of a specimen from Greece suggests that this individual was primarily browsing during the dry (presumably summer) months and consumed more grass during the wet (presumably winter) months. Dental mesowear analysis of specimens from Britain and Greece suggests that the diet also varied according to local environmental conditions, with individuals occupying more grass-dominated open environments having a greater grazing-related wear signal, but that overall straight-tusked elephants tended to have browsing-dominated mixed feeding diets. Preserved stomach contents of German specimens found at Neumark Nord suggests that in temperate Europe, its diet included trees such as maple, linden/lime, hornbeam, hazel, alder, beech, ash, oak, elm, spruce and possibly juniper, as well as other plants like ivy, Pyracantha, Artemisia, mistletoe (Viscum), thistles (Carduus and Cirsium), grass and sedges (Carex), as well as members of Apiaceae, Lauraceae, Rosaceae, Caryophyllaceae and Asteraceae (including the subfamily Lactuceae).

Straight-tusked elephants rarely coexisted alongside mammoths, although they occasionally did so, like at the Ilford locality in Britain that dates to the Marine Isotope Stage (MIS) 7 interglacial (~200,000 years ago) and where both steppe mammoths and P. antiquus are found. At this locality, the two species appear to have engaged in dietary niche partitioning.

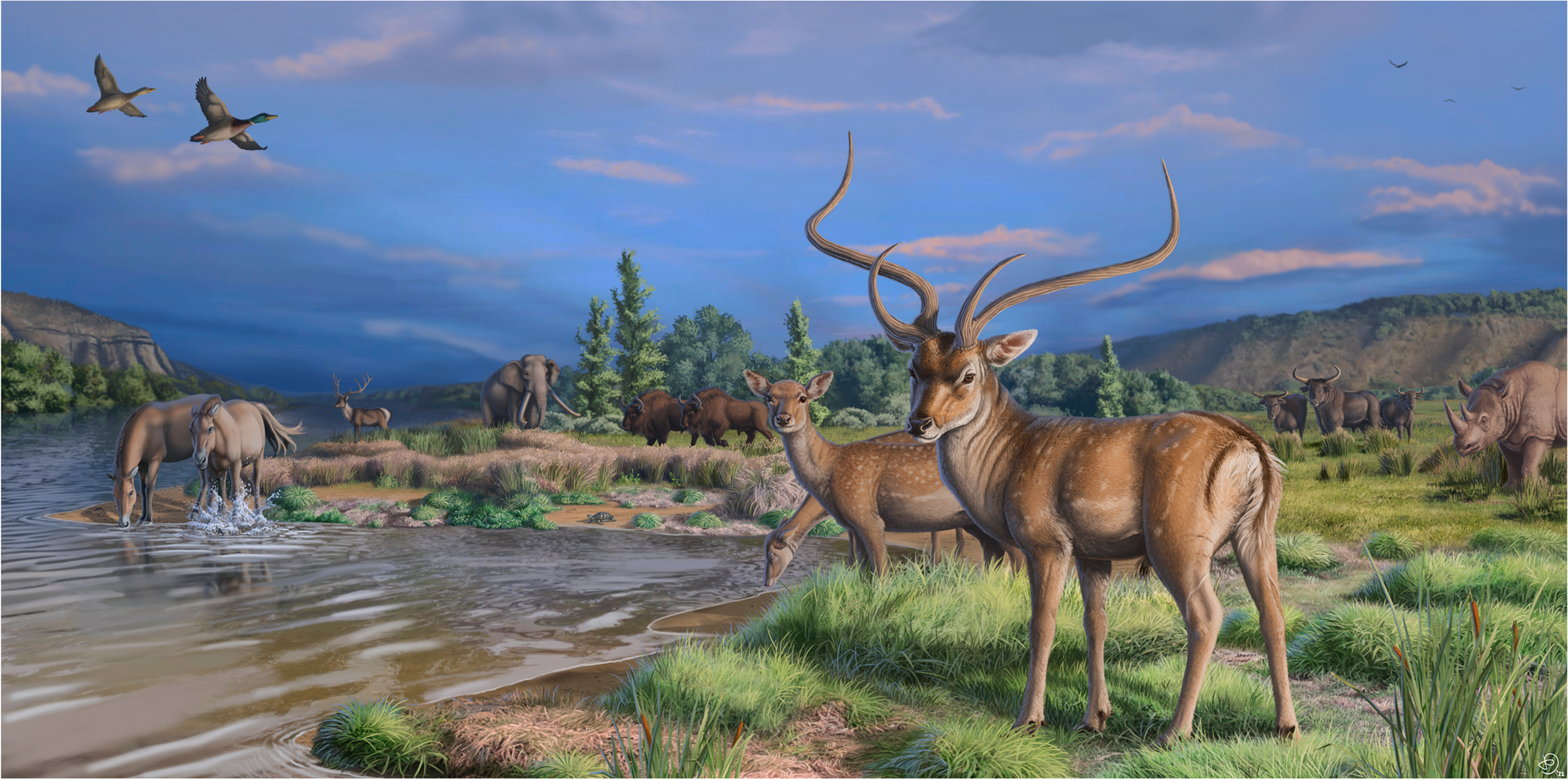
A Middle Pleistocene landscape in Spain, including a straight-tusked elephant (background centre-left) as well as the extinct fallow deer Dama celiae (foreground) wild horse (left), bison, (background centre) aurochs (background right), the narrow-nosed rhinoceros (far right), an Iberian pond turtle and two mallards (left upper corner).

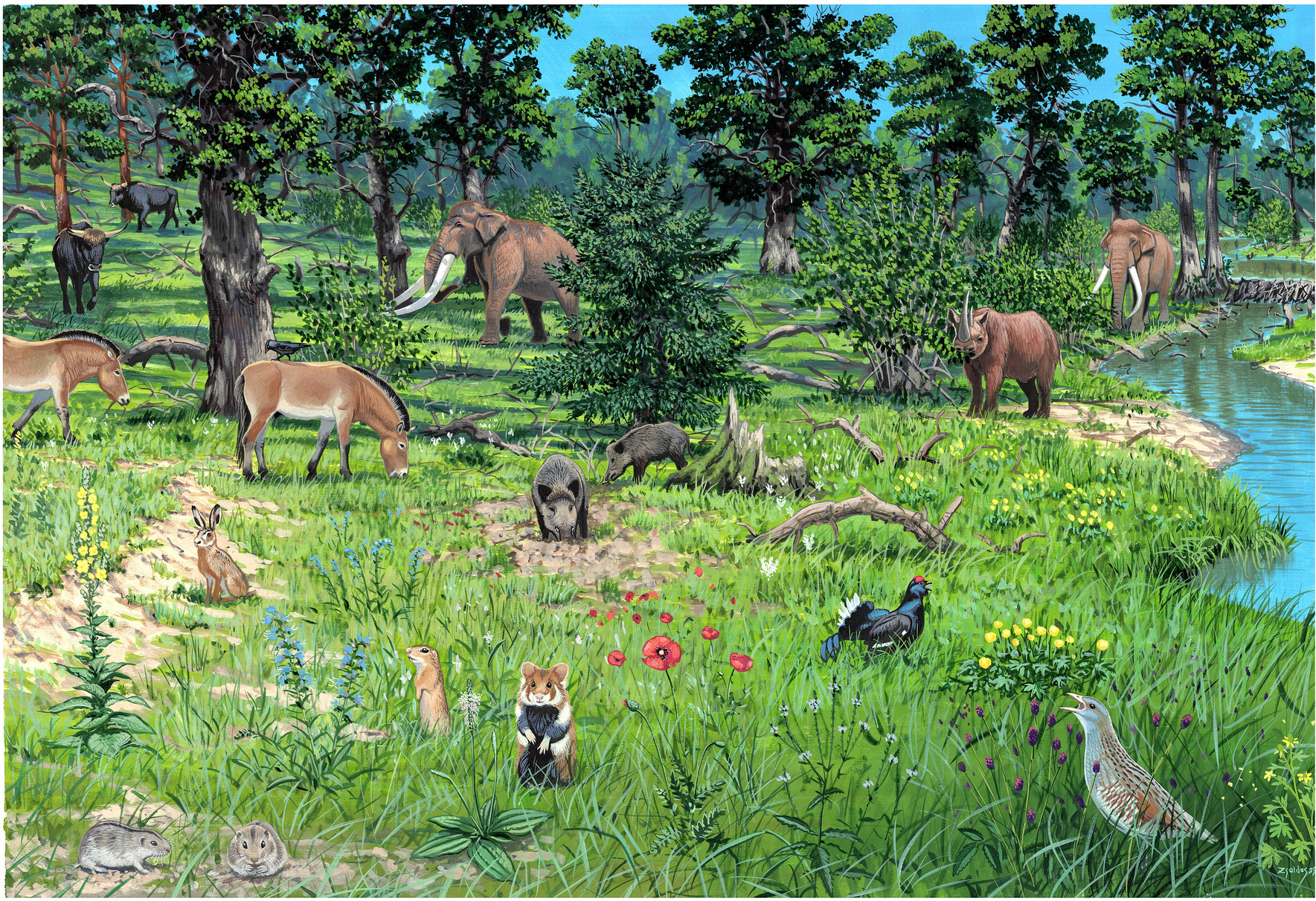
Landscape of Central Europe during the Last Interglacial (~130-115,000 years ago), featuring straight-tusked elephants, and other large herbivorous animals including Merck's rhinoceros, wild boar, wild horse and aurochs. Other featured animals include western jackdaw, corn crake, black grouse, steppe lemming, the extinct ground squirrel Spermophilus citelloides, European hare and European hamster

During interglacial periods, P. antiquus existed as part of the Palaeoloxodon antiquus large-mammal assemblage, along with other temperate adapted megafauna species, including the hippopotamus (Hippopotamus amphibius), rhinoceroses belonging to the genus Stephanorhinus (Merck's rhinoceros S. kirchbergensis and the narrow-nosed rhinoceros S. hemitoechus), the European water buffalo (Bubalus murrensis), bison (Bison spp.), Irish elk (Megaloceros giganteus), aurochs (Bos primigenius), fallow deer (Dama spp.), roe deer (Capreolus capreolus) red deer (Cervus elaphus), moose (Alces alces), wild horse (Equus ferus) and wild boar (Sus scrofa). Carnivores included Eurasian lynx (Lynx lynx) European leopards (Panthera pardus spelaea), cave hyenas (Crocuta spelaea), cave lions (Panthera spelaea), wolves (Canis lupus) and brown bears (Ursus arctos). Some authors have argued, in accordance with the Vera/wood-pasture hypothesis, that the effects of straight-tusked elephants and other extinct megafauna on vegetation likely resulted in increased openness of woodland habitats, though this conclusion has been disputed by other authors.

Potential gnaw marks suggested to have been made by cave hyenas and cave lions on the bones of straight-tusked elephants have been reported at some localities, which suggests that these species likely at least scavenged on the remains of straight-tusked elephants like lions and spotted hyenas do on elephants in Africa today. Remains of juvenile straight-tusked elephants are known from Kirkdale Cave in northern England and Grotta Guattari in central Italy, which are well known cave hyena dens and may suggest predation upon juvenile straight-tusked elephants by cave hyenas, as is exhibited by closely related living spotted hyenas on African elephant calves.

== Relationship with humans ==
Remains of straight-tusked elephants at numerous sites are associated with stone tools and/or bear cut and percussion marks indicative of butchery by archaic humans. At most sites it is unclear whether the elephants were hunted or scavenged, though both scavenging of already dead elephants and active hunting are likely to have occurred. Straight-tusked elephant butchery sites have been reported from Israel, France, Spain, Italy, Greece, Britain, and Germany.

Sites displaying evidence of straight-tusked elephant butchery
Name of site	Country	Age	Notes
Revadim Quarry	Israel	Sometime between around 780,000 and 300,000 years ago	Associated with Acheulean stone tools
Terra Amata	France	MIS 11 c. 400,000 years ago	
Ranville	France	MIS 7, 230–205,000 years ago	
Marathousa 1	Greece	MIS 12, c. 430,000 years ago.	Associated with stone and wooden tools
Ebbsfleet Elephant (Southfleet road) site	United Kingdom	MIS 11, c. 425-415,000 years ago.	Associated with Clactonian stone tools
Schöningen	Germany	MIS 9 c. 300,000 years ago	
Lehringen	Germany	Last Interglacial, c. 120,000 years ago	Associated with a wooden spear and stone tools
Gröbern	Germany	Last Interglacial, c. 120,000 years ago	
Taubach	Germany	Last Interglacial, c. 120,000 years ago	
Neumark-Nord	Germany	Last Interglacial, c. 120,000 years ago	Remains of at least 57 straight-tusked elephant individuals preserved at the site
Aridos 1 and 2	Spain	MIS 11-9, 425-300,000 years ago	
Bolomor Cave	Spain	MIS 9-5e 300-115,000 years ago	
Ficonella	Italy	500-400,000 years ago	
Casal Lumbroso	Italy	MIS 11 c. 400,000 years ago	
Castel di Guido	Italy	MIS 9 c. 327-260,000 years ago	
La Polledrara di Cecanibbio	Italy	MIS 9 c. 325–310,000 years ago	
Poggetti Vecchi	Italy	MIS 6 c. 171,000 years ago	
Campitello Quarry	Italy	MIS 7 c. 206-201,000 years ago	Associated with tar-covered stone tools

Several formerly recognised sites, including Torralba and Ambrona in Spain and Notarchirico in Italy, have been considered questionable because the evidence for butchery is ambiguous and may be due to random chance rather than human action. The Gesher Benot Ya'akov elephant butchery site in Israel, formerly attributed to P. antiquus, is now attributed to P. recki.

These sites are likely attributable to Homo heidelbergensis and Neanderthals. Stone tools used at these sites include flakes, choppers, bifacial tools like handaxes, as well as cores. At some sites, the bones of straight-tusked elephants and in at least one case their ivory were used to make tools. There is evidence that exploitation of straight-tusked elephants in Europe increased and became more systematic from the mid-Middle Pleistocene (around 500,000 years ago) onwards. Based on analysis of sites of straight-tusked elephants with cut marks and/or artifacts, it has been argued that there is little evidence that straight-tusked elephants were targeted preferentially over smaller animals. Most individuals at these sites are subadult to adult and primarily male in sex. The male sex bias likely both represents the fact that adult males, despite their larger size, were more vulnerable targets due to their solitary nature, as well as the tendency of adult male elephants to engage in risky behaviour causing them to die more frequently in natural traps, as well as being weakened or killed by injuries caused by combat with other male elephants during musth.

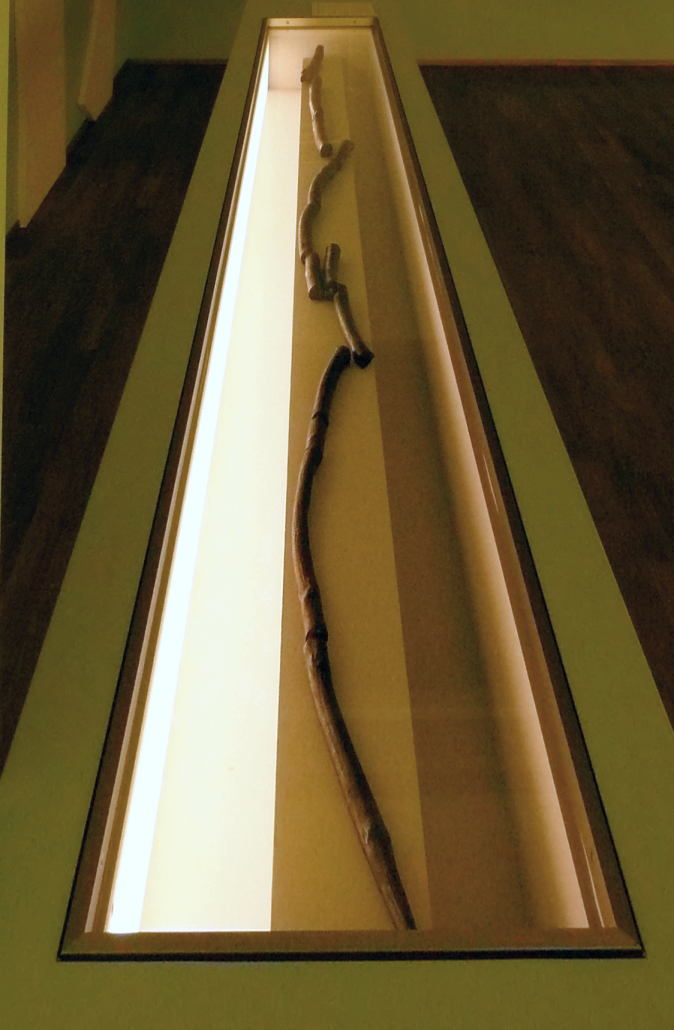
The "Lehringen Spear" on display in Germany

At the Lehringen site in north Germany, dating to the Eemian/Last Interglacial (around 130–115,000 years ago) a skeleton of a mature adult (probably male) straight-tusked elephant, around 45 years of age, was discovered in 1948 with a complete (though currently fractured) spear/lance between its ribs, with its bones displaying cut marks, relatively few carnivore marks and flint artifacts found close by, providing clear evidence that this specimen was hunted, though it has been suggested the elephant may have already been mired prior to being killed. The spear/lance, which is around 2.4 metres (7.9 ft) long, is made of European yew (Taxus baccata), which has both a durable and elastic wood, properties that may have been deliberately selected for. The Lehringen spear/lance, which is one of the oldest known wooden weapons after the Clacton spearhead (also made of yew wood) and the Schöningen spears, has been suggested to have served as a handheld thrusting spear rather than as a throwing weapon. The current c-curved bent shape of the spear suggests that the spear was thrust upwards into the elephants abdomen, and may have been deformed by the elephant falling on it (the current fractured state of the spear is thought to have been due to much later sediment compaction).

Studies in 2023 proposed that in addition to Lehringen, the Neumark Nord, Taubach and Gröbern sites, which show evidence of systematic butchery, provided evidence of widespread hunting of straight-tusked elephants by Neanderthals during the Eemian in Germany. The remains of at least 57 elephants were found at Neumark Nord; the study authors estimated that they accumulated over a time span of around 300 years and that one elephant was hunted once every 5–6 years at the site.

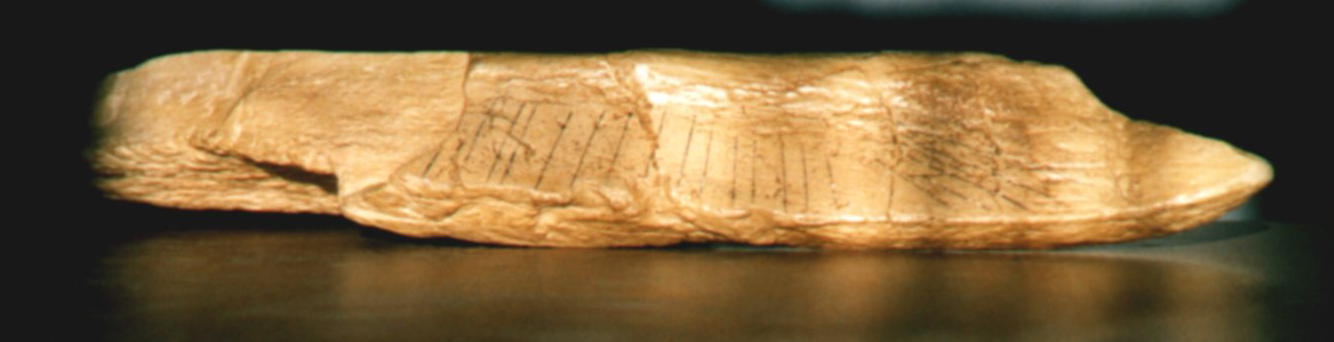
A straight-tusked elephant tibia with deliberate archaic human made incisions, from the Bilzingsleben site in Germany

At the Lower Palaeolithic Bilzingsleben site in Germany and Stránská Skála 1 site in the Czech Republic, bones of straight-tusked elephants have been found engraved with multiple nearly straight lines, either parallel or converging, of unclear purpose.

There are no cave paintings that unambiguously depict P. antiquus. An outline drawing of an elephant in El Castillo cave in Cantabria, Spain, as well as a drawing from Vermelhosa in Portugal have been suggested to possibly depict it, but these could also potentially depict woolly mammoths.

== Extinction ==
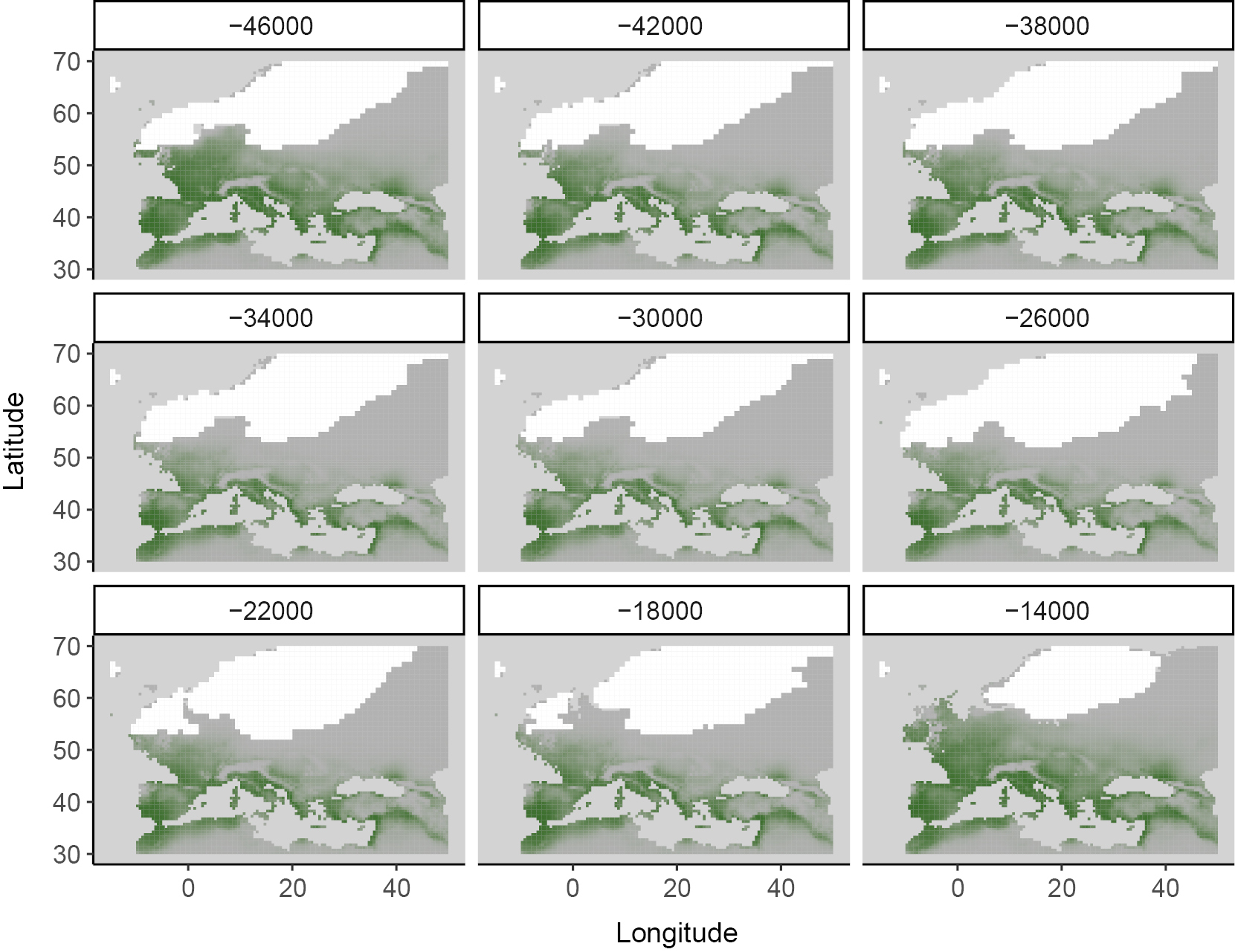
Maps estimating the location of suitable habitat for straight-tusked elephants during the Last Glacial Period from 46,000 until 14,000 years ago, showing contraction in habitable areas and potential refugia

Palaeoloxodon antiquus retreated from northern Europe and contracted to refugia, primarily in southern Europe, after the end of the Last Interglacial around 115,000 years ago due to climatic conditions becoming unfavourable, and fossils during the following Last Glacial Period are rare. In Britain, the species may have persisted until around 87,000 years ago based on remains found in Bacon Hole in Wales. A molar from the cave deposits of Grotta Guattari in central Italy has been suggested to date to around 57,000 years ago, though other studies have found it to have an older early Late Pleistocene age, and later dating done in 2023 of a previously unexcavated section of the cave which also contained straight-tusked elephant remains suggested an age of deposition in this area of the cave of around 66–65,000 years ago. Another late Italian record has been reported from Mousterian layers in Barma Grande cave in northwest Italy, probably dating to around the same time as Grotta Guattari, which has been suggested to display evidence of butchery by Neanderthals. Other late remains have been reported from several sites in the Iberian Peninsula, including El Castillo cave in northern Spain, which were initially radiocarbon dated to 43,000 years ago, with later calibration suggesting an age of around 49,570–44,250 years Before Present, and Foz do Enxarrique (a sequence of terrace deposits of the Tagus river) in central-eastern Portugal, originally dated to around 34–33,000 years ago, but later revised to around 44,000 years ago.

A late date of around 37,400 years ago has been reported from a single molar found in the North Sea off the coast of the Netherlands, but it has been suggested that this date needs independent confirmation, due to only representing a single sample. Some authors have suggested that P. antiquus likely survived until around 28,000 years ago in the southern Iberian Peninsula based on footprints found in Southwest Portugal and Gibraltar. While some authors have argued that climate change was primarily responsible for the extinction of the straight-tusked elephant, others have argued that climate change alone cannot account for the species extinction, as the species had survived previous glacial cycles of similar severity to the Last Glacial Period. The youngest records of straight-tusked elephants overlap in-time with the initial occupation of Europe by modern humans. Human hunting may have played a contributory role in the extinction of the straight-tusked elephant, but the importance of this is uncertain.

Some island dwarf elephant descendants survived considerably later than the youngest confirmed straight-tusked elephant records, with the Sicilian Palaeoloxodon cf. mnaidriensis surviving until sometime after 32,000 years ago, with one record perhaps as late as 20,000-19,000 years ago, while Palaeoloxodon cypriotes on Cyprus survived until at least around 12–11,000 years ago.

The extinction was part of the Late Pleistocene megafauna extinctions, which resulted in the extinction of most large terrestrial mammals globally. The extinction of P. antiquus and other temperate adapted European megafauna has resulted in a severe loss of functional diversity in European ecosystems.
