= Dorothea Bate =

Welsh palaeontologist and archaeozoologist (1878–1951)

Dorothea Bate FGS
- Bate in Valletta, Malta, 1934
- Born: Dorothea Minola Alice Bate; 8 November 1878; Carmarthen, Wales
- Died: 13 January 1951 (aged 72); Westcliff-on-Sea, Essex, England
- Occupations: Palaeontologist; archaeozoologist
- Known for: Discovery and identification of animal fossils
- Awards: Wollaston Fund
- Scientific career
- Workplaces: Natural History Museum, London

Dorothea Minola Alice Bate FGS (8 November 1878 – 13 January 1951), also known as Dorothy Bate, was a Welsh palaeontologist and pioneer of archaeozoology. Her life's work was to find fossils of recently extinct mammals with a view to understanding how and why giant and dwarf forms evolved.

== Early and family life ==
Bate was born on 8 November 1878 at Napier House in Carmarthen to Henry Reginald Bate (1839–1921), a police superintendent and former army major, and Elizabeth Fraser (née Whitehill; c. 1849–1929). Her father was born in Wexford, Ireland and her mother was born in Paisley, Scotland. The second of three siblings, Bate was baptised at St Peter's Church on 6 December 1878.

Following Bate's father's retirement in 1888, the family moved to Gellidywyll House in Cenarth where they became prominent members of the Tivy-side community. Bate received little formal education, and once commented that her education "was only briefly interrupted by school".

== Career ==
In 1895, at the age of 17, Bate got a job at the Natural History Museum in London, sorting bird skins in the Department of Zoology's Bird Room and later preparing fossils. She was probably the first woman to be employed as a scientist by the museum. There she remained for fifty years and studied ornithology, palaeontology, geology and anatomy. She was a piece-worker, paid by the number of fossils she prepared.

In 1901 Bate published her first scientific paper, "A short account of a bone cave in the Carboniferous limestone of the Wye valley", which appeared in the Geological Magazine, about bones of small Pleistocene mammals.

The same year, she visited Cyprus, staying for 18 months at her own expense, to search for bones there, finding twelve new deposits in ossiferous caves, among them bones of the species Hippopotamus minor. In 1902, with the benefit of a hard-won grant from the Royal Society, she discovered in a cave in the Kyrenia hills a new species of dwarf elephant, which she named Elephas cypriotes, later described in a paper for the Royal Society. While in Cyprus she also observed—and trapped, shot and skinned—living mammals and birds and prepared a number of other papers, including descriptions of the Cyprus Spiny Mouse (Acomys nesiotes) and a subspecies of the Eurasian Wren (Troglodytes troglodytes cypriotes).

She later undertook expeditions to many other Mediterranean islands, including Crete, Corsica, Sardinia, Malta, and the Balearic Islands, publishing work on their prehistoric fauna. In the Balearics in 1909, she discovered Myotragus balearicus, a previously unknown species of the subfamily Caprinae. On the plateau of Katharo, in eastern Crete, she found remains of the Cretan dwarf hippopotamus. In Crete, she got to know the archaeologists then excavating Knossos and other sites on the island, who were shedding light on the Minoan civilisation, such as Arthur Evans.

Finding herself sexually harassed by the British Vice-Consul in Mallorca, Bate commented: "I do hate old men who try to make love to one and ought not to in their official positions".

According to The Daily Telegraph –

Her days were spent on foot or mule, traversing barren and bandit-infested terrains and sleeping in flea-ridden hovels and shacks. She would wade through turbulent swells to reach isolated cliff caves where she scuffled about, covered in mud and clay, never without her collecting bag, nets, insect boxes, hammer and – later – dynamite.

In the late 1920s Bate travelled to the British ruled Palestine. She was in her late 40s and well respected. Bates had been invited by Dorothy Garrod, who later became Cambridge University's first female professor and who had been put in charge of an excavation in Haifa by the British military governor. In Bethlehem Bates and Elinor Wight Gardner discovered an extinct elephant species, an early horse and a prehistoric giant tortoise. They also discovered evidence that animals had been hunted by Bethlehem's first human inhabitants. In the 1930s Bate studied the animal bones Garrod had excavated in the Mount Carmel caves, which contained a succession of Upper Pleistocene levels. Instead of just inferring climatic conditions from the presence or absence of cold- or warm-loving animals, she was an early pioneer of the approach to take large samples of fauna of a succession of archaeological strata. These provided a series of plots. Bate worked on the basis that alterations in the frequency of species of animal hunted by early man reflected naturally occurring changes. This work made her an early pioneer of archaeozoology, especially in the field of climatic interpretation.

Bate also worked alongside the archaeologist Professor Dorothy Garrod in the Caves of Nahal Me'arot, where excavations had commenced in 1928. She was the first to study the faunas of the area, her stated research aim being the reconstruction of the natural history of the Pleistocene (Ice Age) fauna of the Levant region. Being aware of the fossils and the numerous human occupations her study of the Carmel Caves was pioneering. She described several new species, and identified several species that had previously not been known to have existed in this area in the Pleistocene. She constructed one of the first quantitative curves of faunal succession, and in reference to ancient climate she identified a faunal break between primitive and modern mammal communities during the Middle of the Ice Age. Bate identified the shifts from deer to gazelle dominance as rooted in changes of regional vegetation and paleoclimates. She was also the first to identify a Canis familiaris to have lived in the Ice Age, based on a skull that had been found. Decades later more remains of Natufian dogs were found. Her pioneering research was published in 1937, when Bate and Garrod published The Stone Age of Mount Carmel volume 1, part 2: Palaeontology, the Fossil Fauna of the Wady el-Mughara Caves, interpreting the Mount Carmel excavations. Among other finds, they reported remains of the hippopotamus.

Bate also worked with Percy Lowe on fossil ostriches in China. She compared the relative proportions of Gazella and Dama remains. In 1940, Bate became an elected fellow of the Geological Society and also received the Wollaston Fund.

During the Second World War, Bate transferred from the Natural History Museum's department of geology in London to its zoological branch at Tring, and in 1948, a few months short of her seventieth birthday, she was appointed officer-in-charge there.

== Personal life ==
When she was 34 her younger brother broke his leg and she spent around 18 months looking after her parents. She was later disinherited by her parents in order to provide a dowry for her brother to marry a wealthy woman.

Although suffering from cancer, she died of a heart attack on 13 January 1951, and as a Christian Scientist was cremated. Her personal papers were destroyed in a house fire shortly after her death. On her desk at Tring was a list of 'Papers to write'. By the last in the list she had written Swan Song.

Her estate at death amounted to £15,369.

== Legacy ==
Many archaeologists and anthropologists relied on her expertise in identifying fossil bones, including Louis Leakey, Charles McBurney and John Desmond Clark.

In 2005, a 'Dorothea Bate facsimile' was created at the Natural History Museum as part of a project to develop notable gallery characters to patrol its display cases. Along with those of Carl Linnaeus, Mary Anning, and William Smith, the exhibition tells stories and anecdotes of her life and discoveries.

In her biography Discovering Dorothea: the Life of the Pioneering Fossil-Hunter Dorothea Bate, Karolyn Shindler describes Bate as "witty, acerbic, clever and courageous". Shindler is also the author of Bate's biography in the 2004 edition of the Dictionary of National Biography.

=== Honours ===
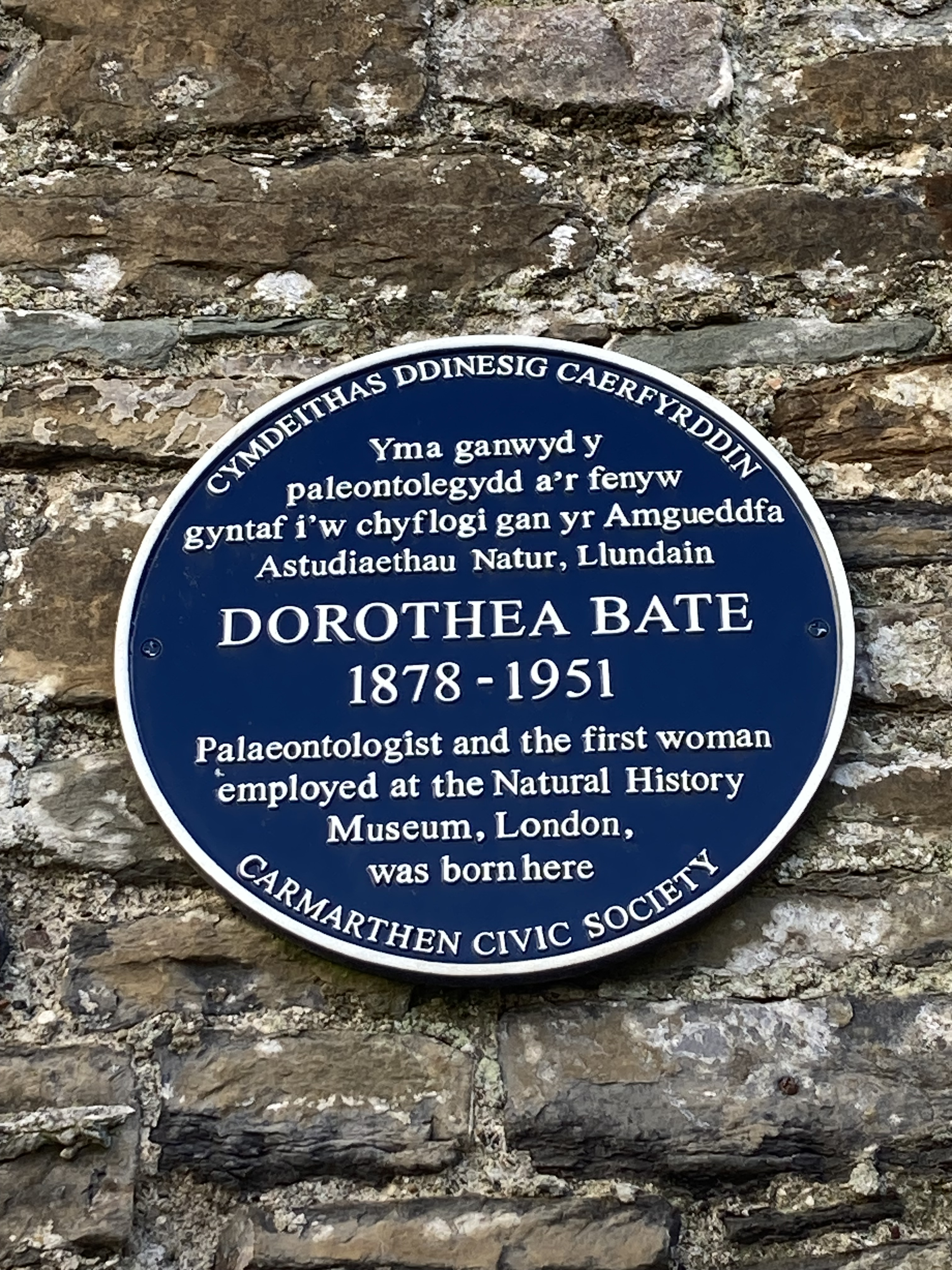
Dorothea Bate's blue plaque in Carmarthen

On 6 December 2017, a Blue Plaque was erected on Bate's birthplace, by the Carmarthen Civic Society. Historic England unveiled a blue plaque on 7 September 2026 in Bate's honour at the Natural History Museum in Tring, in Hertfordshire, where she worked from 1948 It is part of the National Blue Plaques Scheme.

=== Portrait ===
A watercolour portrait of Bate as a young woman, drawn by her sister, is at the Natural History Museum. In it she wears a black dress trimmed with white lace, and a large pink rose.

== Selected publications ==
- A short account of a bone cave in the Carboniferous limestone of the Wye valley, Geological Magazine, new series, 4th decade, 8 (1901), pp. 101–6
- Preliminary Note on the Discovery of a Pigmy Elephant in the Pleistocene of Cyprus (1902–1903)
- Further Note on the Remains of Elephas cypriotes from a Cave-Deposit in Cyprus (1905)
- On Elephant Remains from Crete, with Description of Elephas creticus (1907)
- Excavation of a Mousterian rock-shelter at Devil's Tower, Gibraltar (with Dorothy Garrod, L. H. D. Buxton, and G. M. Smith, 1928)
- A Note on the Fauna of the Athlit Caves (1932)
- The Stone Age of Mount Carmel, volume 1, part 2: Palaeontology, the Fossil Fauna of the Wady el-Mughara Caves (with Professor Dorothy Garrod, 1937)
