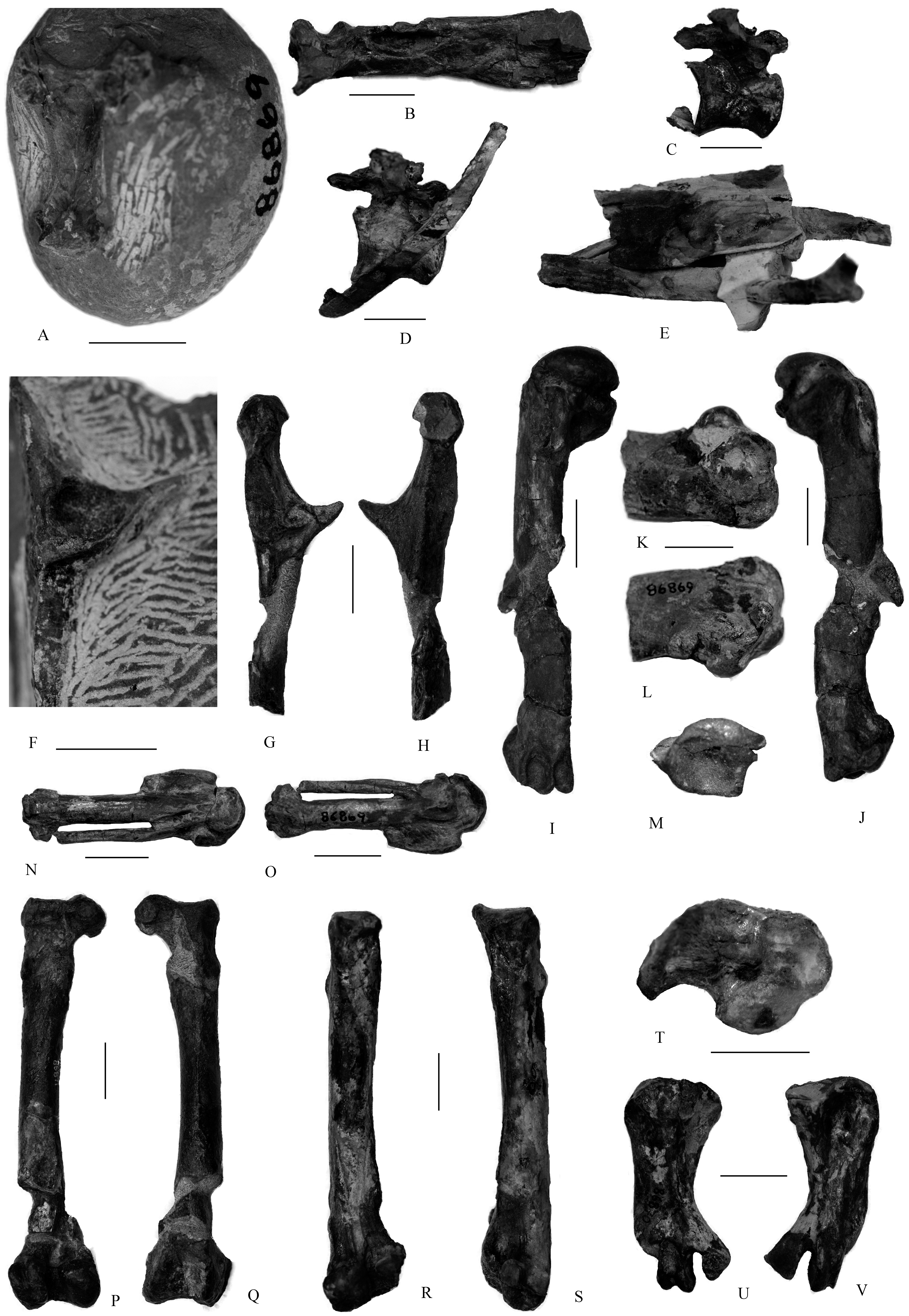
- Fossil material referred to K. buchanani, cf. ?K. clarki and the UWBM 86871 species

Scientific classification
- Kingdom: Animalia
- Phylum: Chordata
- Class: Aves
- Order: Suliformes
- Family: †Plotopteridae
- Subfamily: †Tonsalinae
- Genus: †Klallamornis; Mayr & Goedert, 2016

Type species
- Klallamornis abyssa Mayr & Goedert, 2016

Species
- K. abyssa Mayr & Goedert, 2015; K. buchanani Dyke, Wang & Habib, 2011; K. clarki? Mayr & Goedert, 2015

Synonyms
- Tonsala buchanani Dyke, Wang & Habib, 2011

= Klallamornis =

Klallamornis Temporal range: Late Eocene-Late Oligocene ~Priabonian–Chattian

Extinct genus of American flightless birds

Klallamornis is an extinct genus of Plotopteridae, a family of large, flightless birds related to modern cormorants, darters, gannets, and boobies. This genus included the largest North American plotopterids. Its remains can be found in Late Eocene to Late Oligocene rocks from the Makah Formation, the overlying Pysht Formation and the Lincoln Creek Formation of the State of Washington. During its existence, Klallamornis was the largest plotopterid on the North American continent. The first fossil remains attributed to the taxon were collected in 1983, although the genus was not described until 2016.

Klallamornis was a large pelagic seabird. Despite being unable to fly, its wings were heavily built and muscular, a consequence of wing-propelled diving adaptations. It was superficially similar with modern penguins, despite being only distantly related to them.

The genus has a complicated taxonomy; of the three species published, two of them, K. buchanani and K. abyssa might be synonymous. K. buchanani was only recently assigned to the genus, and was referred until 2021 to the related genus Tonsala. ?K. clarki is only tentatively referred to the genus. One of the specimens assigned to ?K. clarki, generally nicknamed "Whiskey Creek plotopterid" in earlier paper after the locality where it was discovered, might be the oldest known plotopterid, dating as far back than the Priabonian.

Klallamornis appeared during a period of global cooling, marked by the appearance of kelp forests in the North Pacific and a renewal in volcanism along the coast of the Pacific Northwest, creating a chain of volcanic islands in the area, a perfect area for the reproduction of large flightless birds. It coexisted with some of the earliest whales in the North Pacific, the large semi-aquatic desmostylians, and its close relatives Tonsala and Olympidytes.

== Etymology ==
The genus name, Klallamornis, was given after the Klallam culture, native of the area of the Olympic Mountains where terrains associated with the Pysht Formation and the Makah Formation have yielded the first identified remains of the genus.

== History ==
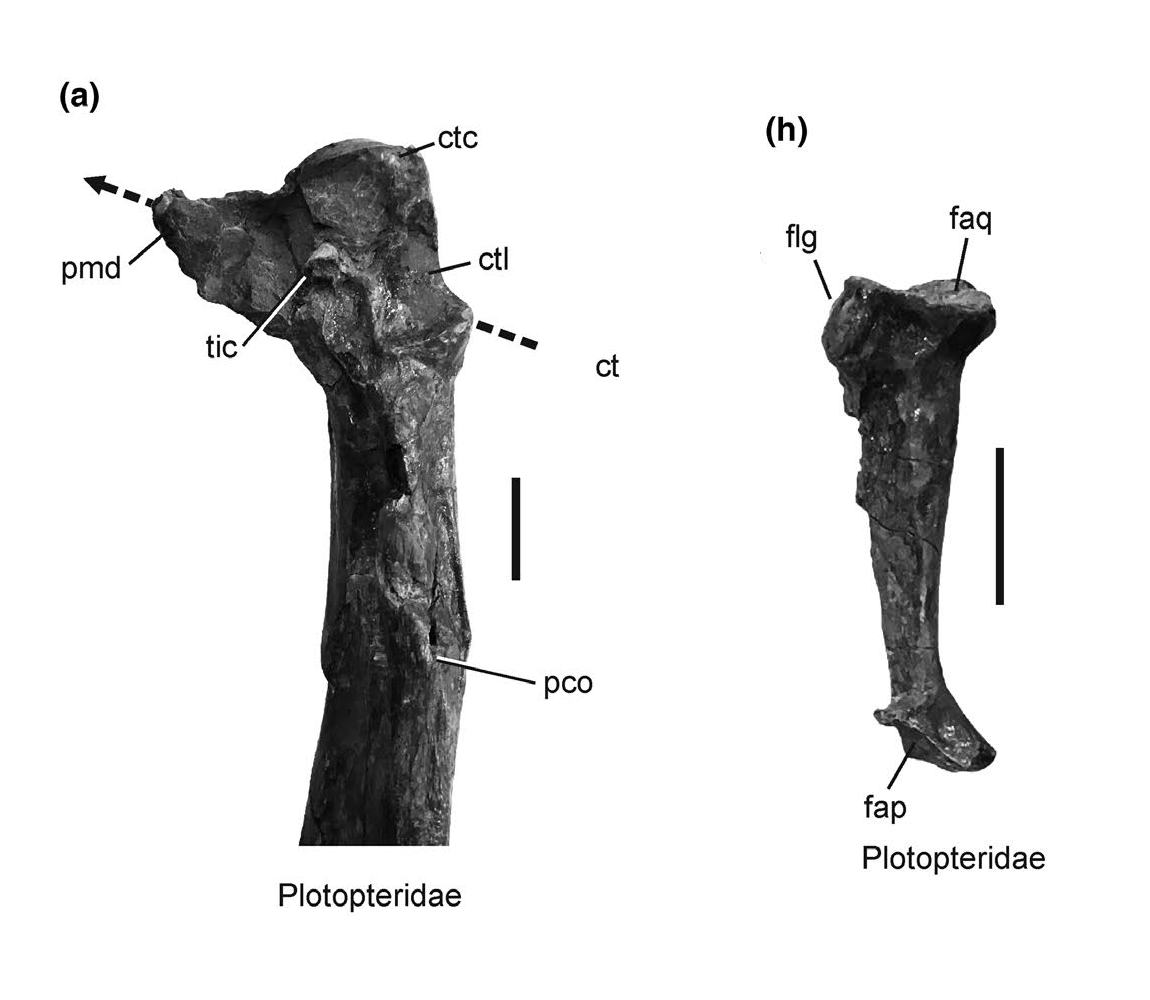
Pterygoid of the "Whiskey Creek plotopterid", cf. ?Klallamornis clarki.

=== History of research ===
==== Early discoveries and research ====
Fossils associated with Klallamornis were among the earliest known remains of plotopterids; recognition of specimen attributed to the genus as a new species or a new genus of plotopterid dates from the early 2000s. In 1983, one of the specimens associated with K. buchanani was collected by James L. Goedert. In 2002, the first recovered specimens, including the "Whiskey Creek plotopterid" (UWBM 86869), one of the most ancient plotopterids known, another partial skeleton and an isolated tarsometatarsus, from the younger Jansen Creek member of the Makah Formation, collected by James L. Goedert, were identified as remains from one or several undescribed species of plotopterids by Goedert and John Cornish.

In 2011, Gareth J. Dyke, Xia Wang and Michael B. Habib described a new species of large plotopterid based on a partial, although relatively well-preserved skeleton from the Oligocene of the Pysht Formation, UWBM 86875, as Tonsala buchanani, the second species from the genus Tonsala to be described. Alongside the holotype, they referred to the newly described species the three indeterminate plotopterid specimens collected by Goedert in the Makah Formation. In 2015, Goedert, Gerald Mayr and Olaf Vogel speculated that the remains associated with Tonsala buchanani may represent several species, on account of the lapse of 5 million years between the Whiskey Creek plotopterid and the holotype, and that some morphological characters indicated that T. buchanani differed at the genus level from T. hildegardae, the type species of Tonsala.

==== Description of the genus ====
In 2016, Goedert and Mayr described a new genus and two new species of plotopterids : Klallamornis abyssa, the type species of the new genus, based on a partial skeleton collected in 1991 by Goedert, SMF Av 610, and dated from the Late Oligocene of the Pysht Formation, with two other specimens, an isolated and fragmentary tibiotarsus and a coracoid, respectively collected in 1988 by Goedert and in 1985 by M. J. Berglund, both from the Jansen Creek Member of the Makah Formation, referred to the genus; and the tentatively assigned ?Klallamornis clarki, much larger, but only known from a tarsometatarsus collected in 1988 in the Jansen Creek Member of the Makah Formation by R. L. Clark. In this article, they expressed additional concerns against the assignation of specimens to T. buchanani and the assignation of the species to the genus Tonsala, and reflected, although without more action, at the possibility that the Whiskey Creek plotopterid may represent another specimen of ?K. clarki.

==== Recent works ====
Localities where Klallamornis remains have been discovered.

More recently, Mayr and Goedert reviewed the remains associated with Tonsala buchanani; they concluded that those remains belonged to an animal closer to Klallamornis, and recombined the species as Klallamornis buchanani. They also referred to the genus several new specimens. They stripped K. buchanani of the totality of its referred material aside from the holotype, and referred to it another specimen from the same deposits. Three new specimens were assigned to ?K. clarki, and the Whiskey Creek plotopterid was tentatively assigned to the same species as cf ?Klallamornis clarki. They tentatively assigned to the genus another undescribed species, based on another specimen once attributed to K. buchanani, noting however that the specimen could also belong to the genus Olympidytes, or to a new genus, as cf. Klallamornis or Olympidytes.

== Description ==
=== General characters ===
The genus Klallamornis consist of the three largest American plotopterids; the largest, ?K. clarki, from the Late Eocene to Early Oligocene, only being dwarfed by the giant Japanese plotopterids Hokkaidornis and Copepteryx.

The scapula had a wider caudal portion with a more curved dorsal border than that of Tonsala, and the truncate caudal margin faced medially instead of laterally like in Hokkaidornis. The coracoid had a processus lateralis forming an omally directed hook, and the angle between it and the sternal articular facet was steeper than that of Copepteryx; the extremitas sternalis was devoid of the narrow spur present on the latter genus. The vertebrae were devoid of the co-ossified ligaments present in modern sulids and cormorants. The stoutness of the femur of K. abyssa was intermediate between that of Tonsala hildegardae and those of the larger Japanese genera. The tibiotarsus had a wider intercondylar fossa, a lower medial condyle, a narrower pons supratendineus than that of Olympidytes.

=== Similarities with penguins ===
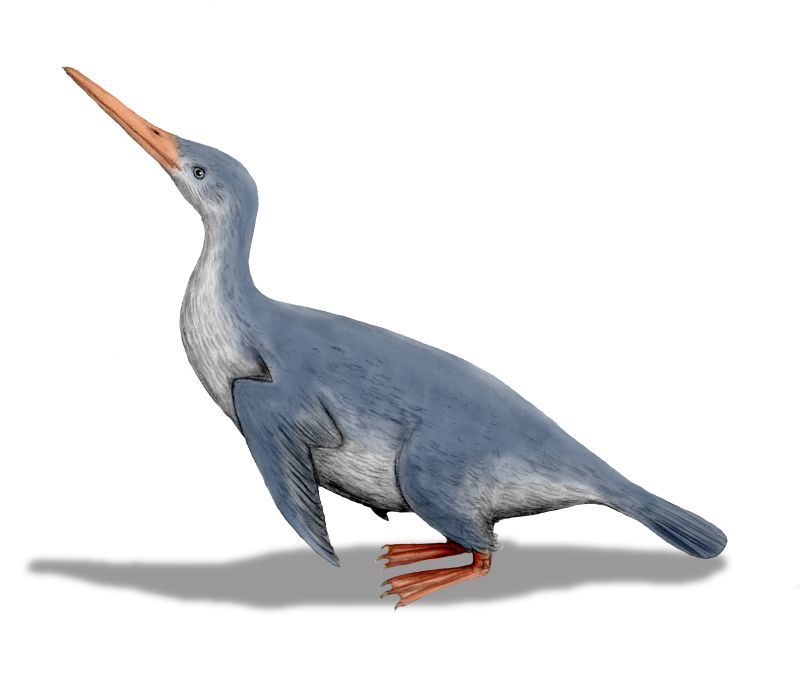
The early penguin Waimanu. Plotopterids were superficially similar to modern penguins, but the absence of kneecaps in early penguins made them adopt a distinctive sprawled pose.

Plotopterids evolved and diversified in the North Pacific roughly at the same time than the ancestors of modern penguins in the South Pacific, like Waimanu and Sequiwaimanu from New Zealand and Crossvallia from the Antarctic. Despite their similarities, it has been demonstrated that they belonged to two different lineages, the plotopterids being related to cormorants and darters, while the ancestors of the penguins were related to petrels and albatrosses. Notably, ancestors of penguins were likely devoid of the patella allowing the upright stance on land assumed by modern penguins and plotopterids.

Regardless, they are very similar osteologically, notably on their shared adaptations for wing-propelled diving, pelagic lifestyle, their use of gastroliths and the structure of their brain. They also shared similarities, notably in the shape of the forelimb, with extinct flightless auks, like Pinguinus and Mancalla. Those adaptations are today considered a remarkable case of convergent evolution, caused by the need for a better adaptation at wing-propelled diving in various clades of flightless marine birds, energetically more efficient than foot-propelled diving in deep waters.

== Classification ==
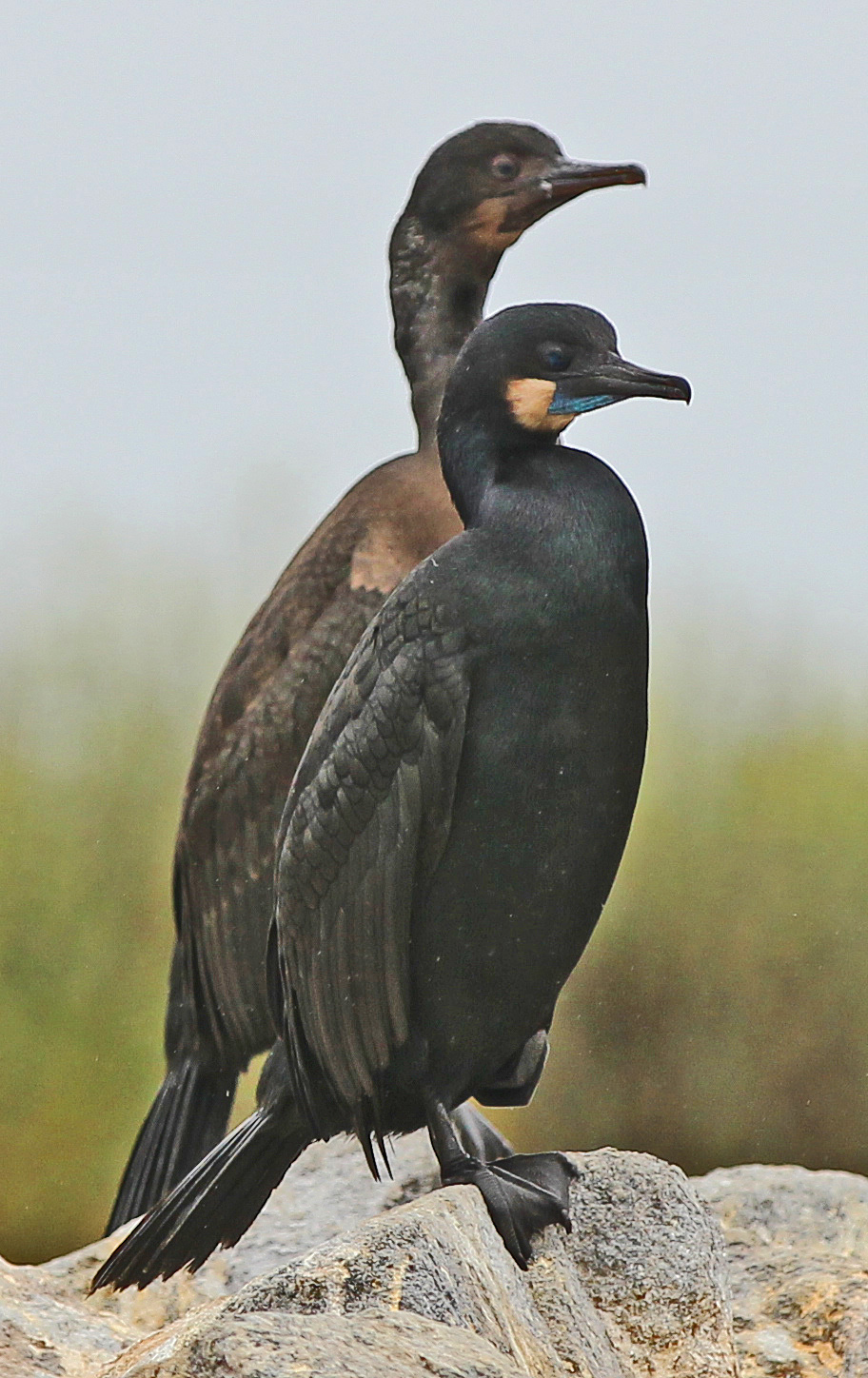
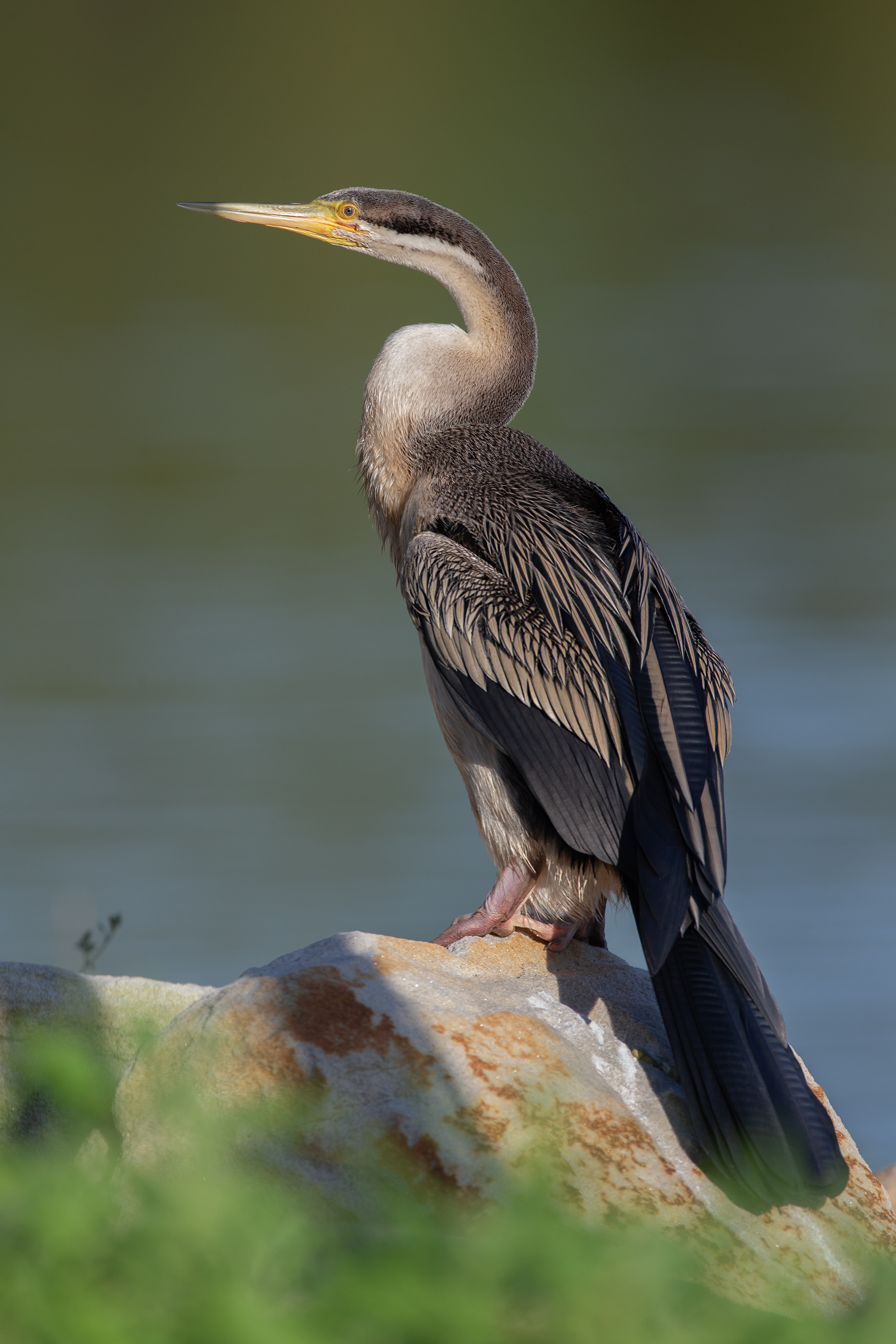
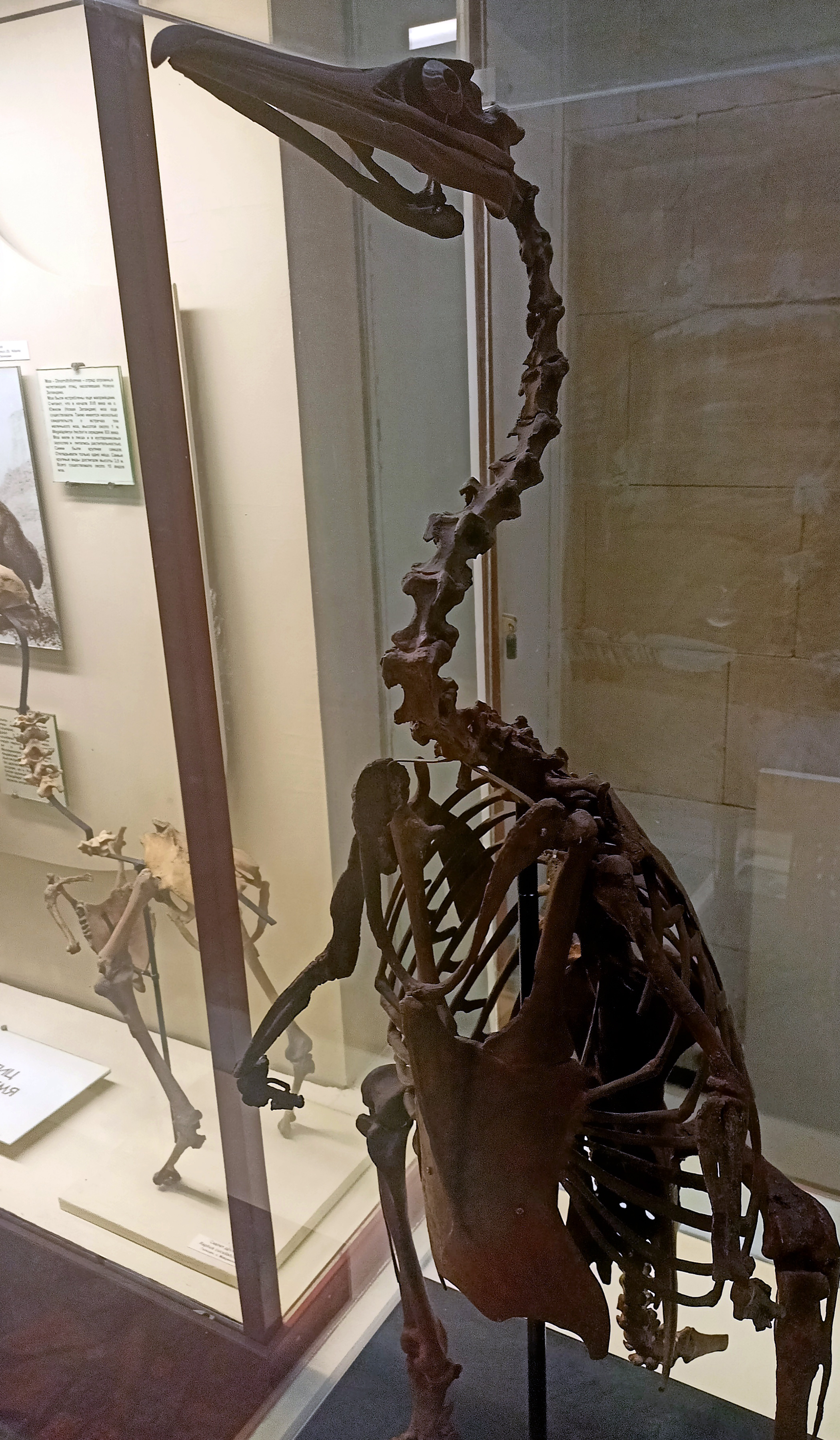
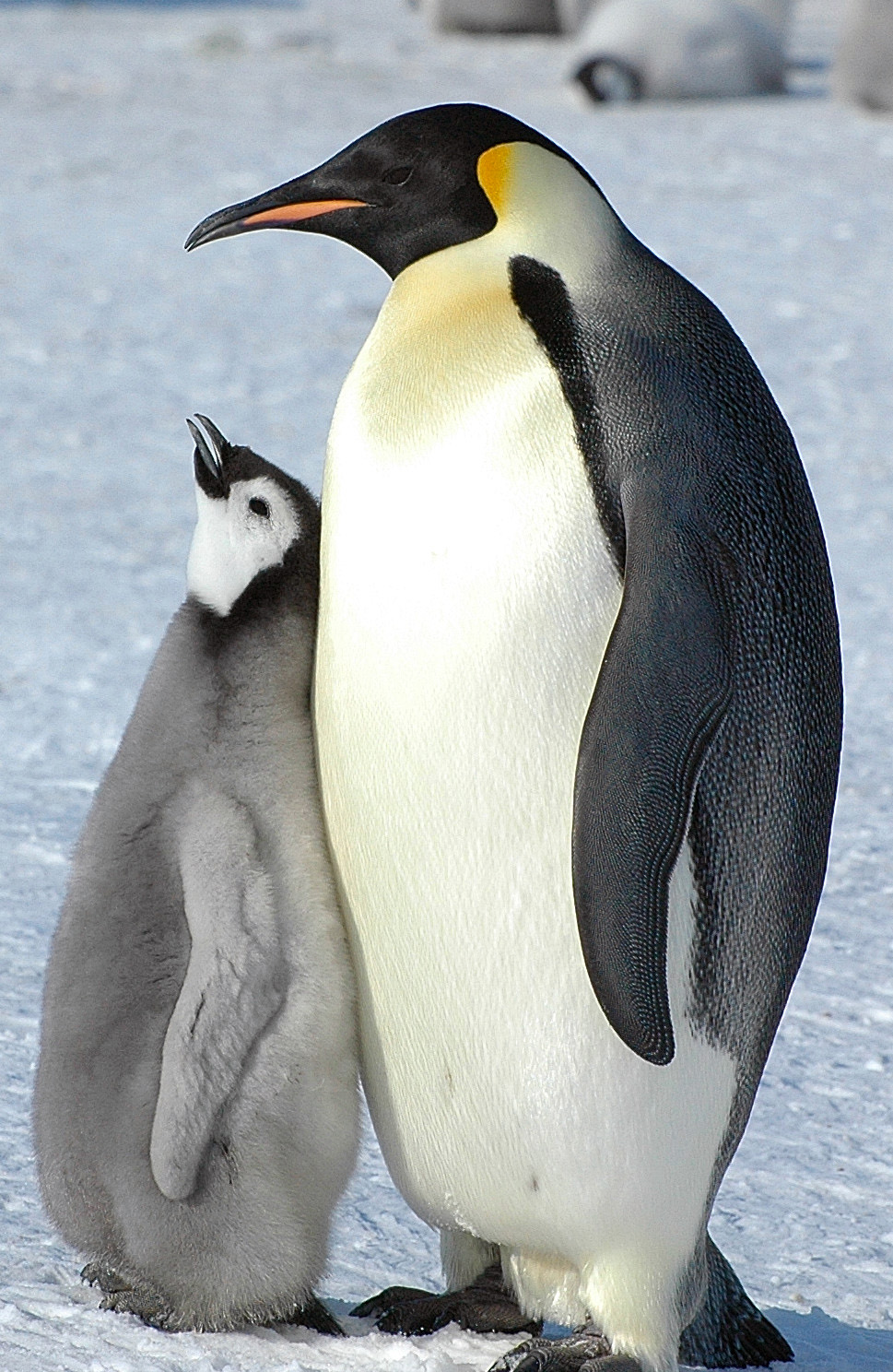
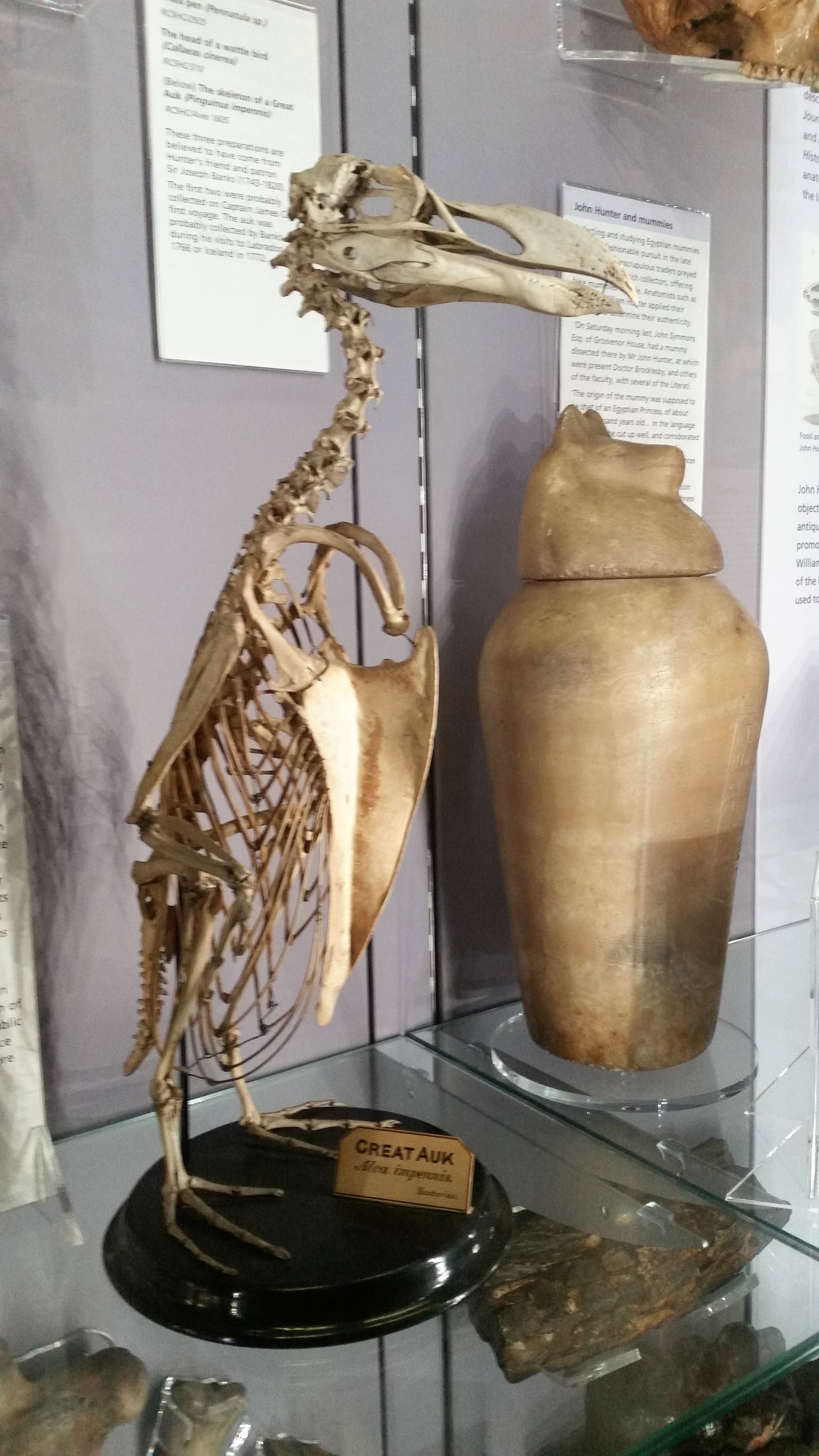
From left to right : Brandt's cormorant, Australasian darter, skeletal reconstruction of Copepteryx hexeris, Emperor penguin, Great auk. Despite their similarities with modern penguins and extinct flightless auks, plotopterids like Klallamornis are today considered closer to cormorants and darters.

While it has been suggested in the past that plotopterids, as a group, were related to Spheniscidae, the clade including modern penguins and their ancestors, it is today widely understood that they are either the sister group of the clade including modern cormorants and darters, or the sister group of the Suliformes. The currently accepted phylogeny recovers the family as the latter hypothesis, as:

- Suliformes
  - Fregatidae
  - - †Plotopteridae
    - Suloidea
      - Sulidae
      - - Anhingidae
        - Phalacrocoracidae

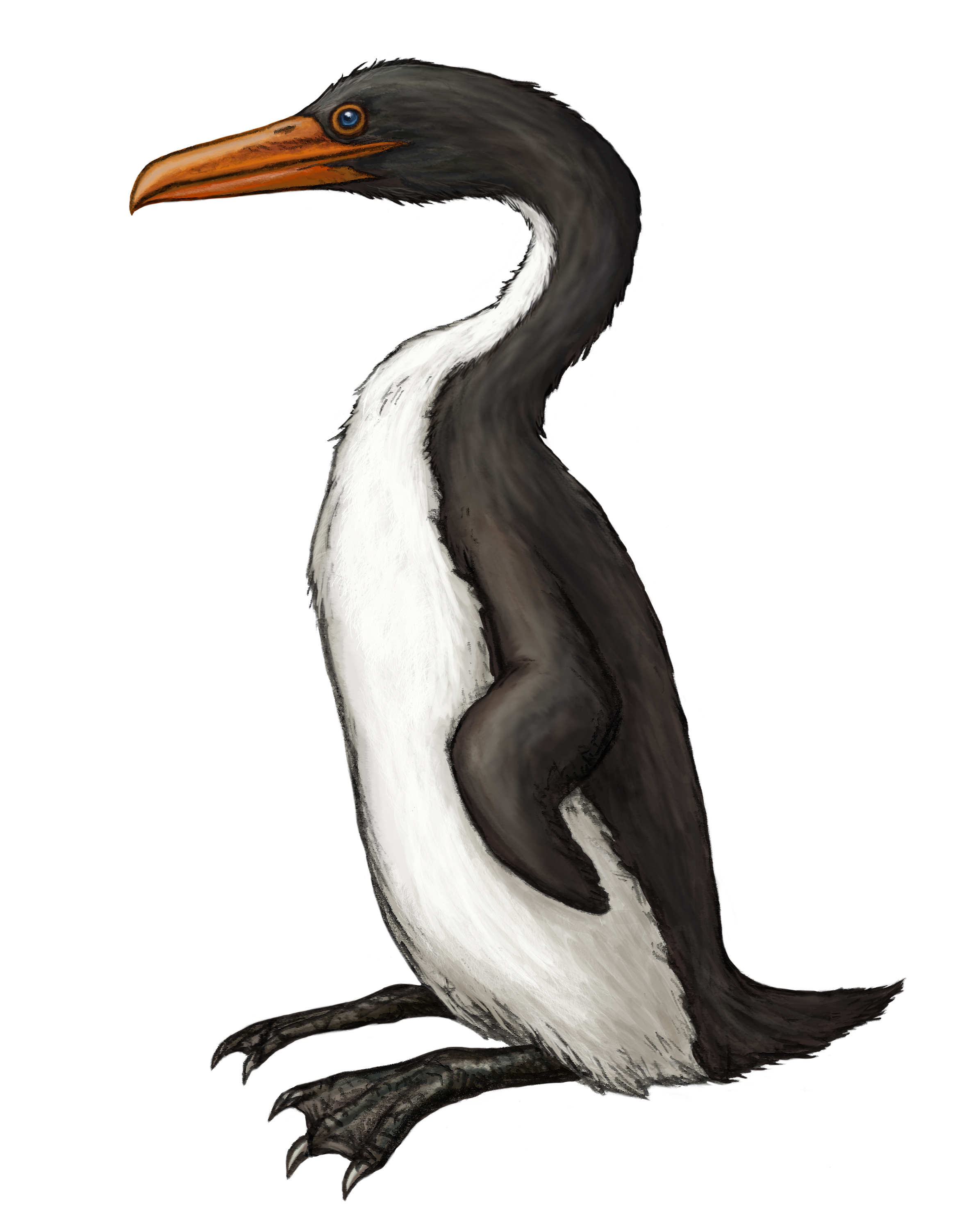
Life restoration of K. abyssa

Within Plotopteridae, Klallamornis is nested with the larger members of the family, Olympidytes, Tonsala, Copepteryx and Hokkaidornis within the subfamily Tonsalinae, distinguished mostly by their size and the reduction of the distal vascular foramen of the tarsometatarsus.

Within Tonsalinae, it has been suggested two potential relationships for Klallamornis. The first, taking into account the absence of the distal vascular foramen in the tibiotarsus of both Klallamornis and Olympidytes, consider them to be sister taxa; while this theory is not currently retained, other characters, like a similarly shaped femur, seems to unite the wo genus. The second, retained in a latter cladistic analysis, considers that Klallamornis, due to its size, is more closely related to the large Japanese taxa Hokkaidornis and Copepteryx, potentially clading with them, as:

- Plotopteridae
  - Stemec
  - Plotopterum
  - Phocavis
  - - Tonsala
    - Tonsalinae
      - Olympidytes
      - - Klallamornis
        - Copepteryx
        - Hokkaidornis

Within the genus, and although K. abyssa and K. buchanani may be synonymous, it has been suggested that ?K. clarki, the larger subspecies, is closely related to the Japanese giant taxa, assuming that gigantism evolved only once in tonsaline plotopterids. The assignment of ?K. clarki to the genus is only tentative and not supported by precise characters, due to the paucity and the bad preservation of the remains attributed to K. buchanani and K. abyssa.

== Species ==
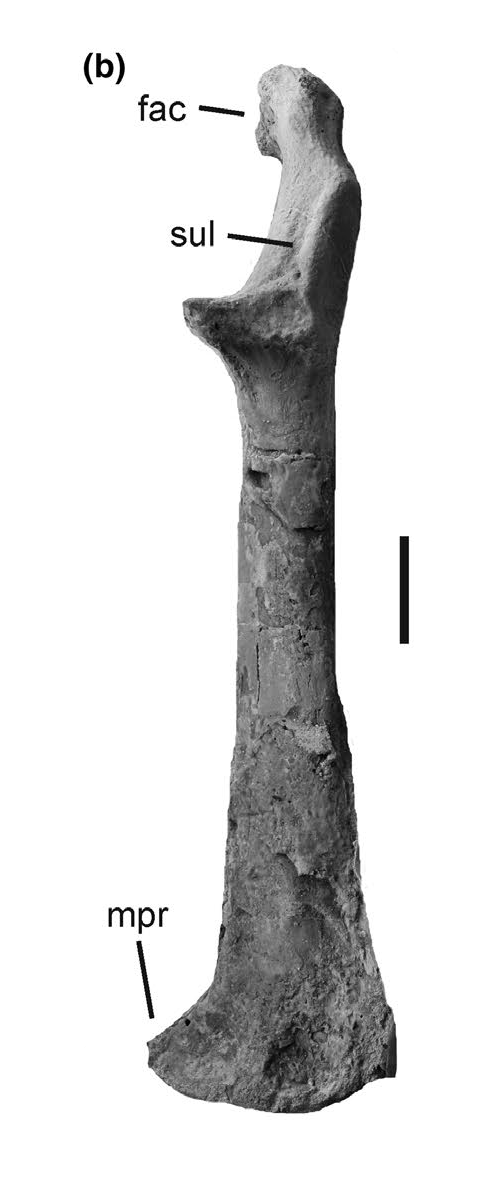
Coracoid of Klallamornis abyssa.

=== Klallamornis abyssa ===
K. abyssa is the type species of the genus Klallamornis. The second largest known plotopterid from the American continent, it was 30% smaller than Hokkaidornis. It is known from three specimens, including its holotype, SMF Av 610, an incomplete skeleton from the Late Oligocene of the Pysht Formation, as well as two isolated and damaged bones, a tibiotarsus and a coracoid, both coming from the older Jansen Creek Member of the Makah Formation, and dated from the Late Eocene to Early Oligocene.

The species name, abyssa, was given in reference of the deep sea strata in which the holotype was discovered.

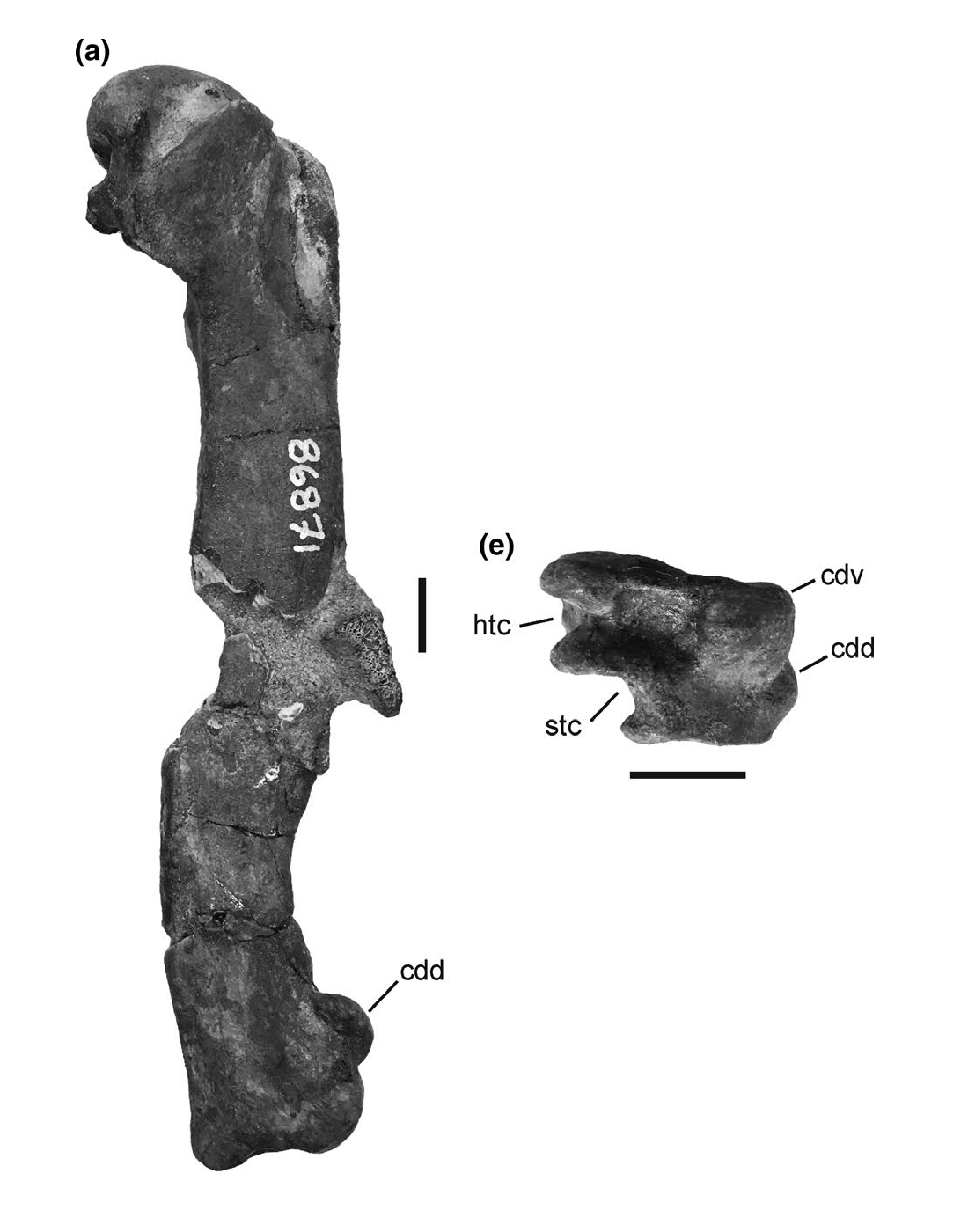
Humerus of Klallamornis buchanani.

=== Klallamornis buchanani ===
K. buchanani is the smallest species of the genus Klallamornis. It was attributed to the genus Tonsala until 2021. It is safely known from two specimens, including its holotype, the partial postcranial skeleton UWBM 86875, both from the Late Oligocene of the Pysht Formation. The femur was shorter than that of K. abyssa, although this size difference can be caused by sexual dimorphism; satisfying distinction between the two species is difficult to establish, and they are mainly differentiated by characteristics of their femora, notably by the presence of a straighter shaft and a wide medial rim on the caudal portion of the condylus lateralis. It is however possible that the two species are synonymous.

The species name, buchanani, honours William "Bill" Buchanan, a late resident of Clallam Bay, who collected and donated several specimens to institutions.

=== ?Klallamornis clarki ===
?K. clarki is the largest and best known species included within the genus Klallamornis, as it is the largest known American plotopterids, being 20% smaller than its Japanese counterpart Hokkaidornis. Its inclusion within the genus Klallamornis is only speculative, due to the paucity of its remains and the absence of overlap with specimens of K. abyssa, aside from the vertebrae of the paratype. It is known from five specimens; its holotype, LACM 129405, a left tarsometatarsus, the tentatively referred paratype SMF Av 612, a fragmentary pelvis and two associated vertebrae, the former of which shared several similarities with that of Hokkaidornis, and a fragmentary humerus, all collected in Late Eocene to Early Oligocene rocks from the Jansen Creek Member of the Makah Formation, as well than two specimens collected in Late Eocene to Early Oligocene rocks of the Lincoln Creek Formation, a fragmentary couple of humerus associated with a thoracic vertebra, and an isolated thoracic vertebra. The humerus was similar with those of Tonsala and UWBM 86871.

The species name, clarki, honours R. L. Clark, a late museum technician from the Los Angeles County Museum.

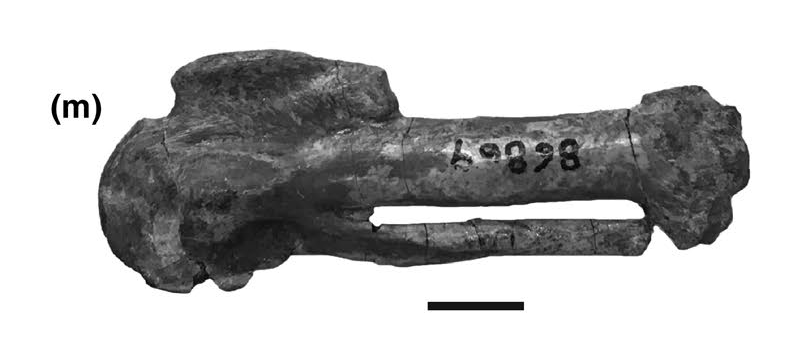
Carpometacarpus of the "Whiskey Creek plotopterid".

==== Whiskey Creek plotopterid ====
The specimen UWBM 86869, often referred in literature as "Whiskey Creek plotopterid", represent both one of the earliest and largest plotopterid known from the North American continent. It is today tentatively referred to ?Klallamornis clarki. Discovered in a Late Eocene strata of the Makah Formation near the Whiskey Creek locality, and potentially older than the primitive Phocavis, it was only referred to ?K. clarki due to its large size, as the material known from the species does not overlap with the specimen. Regardless of its relationships, it demonstrate that large sizes were achieved early in the evolution of plotopterids, and contrast with the youngest known plotopterid, the small-sized Plotopterum from the Miocene of Japan.

=== Cf. Klallamornis or Olympidytes sp. ===
Tentatively referred to the genus, the fairly complete specimen UWBM 86871, that could also belong to Olympidytes, likely represent at least a new species. It was found in the Jansen Creek Member of the Makah Formation, in rocks dated from the Late Eocene to Early Oligocene, and an isolated right humerus found in the same deposits might belong to the same species. The femur was slightly shorter than that of K. buchanani, with a narrower proximal end and condylus lateralis. The tarsometatarsus 86870 may belong to the same species.

== Palaeobiology ==
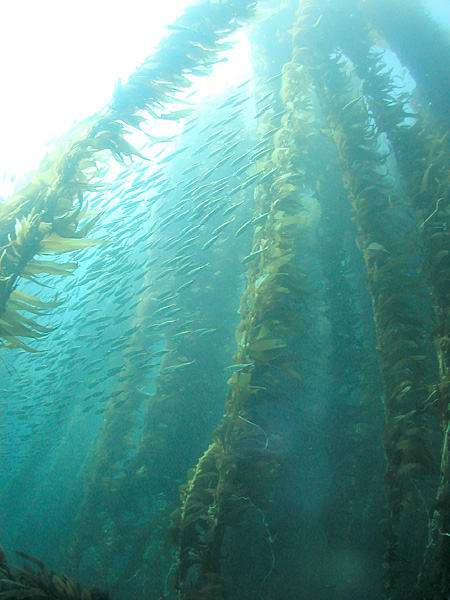
The appearance of kelp forests might have benefitted the diversification of plotopterids.

=== Palaeoenvironment ===
The rapid evolution and diversification of plotopterids can be explained by the occurrence of large-scale climatic and environmental changes in the North Pacific between the end of the Eocene and the early Oligocene. The emergence, caused by a subduction-caused volcanism, of a belt of offshore volcanic islands along the coast of Washington and Oregon, generated a natural breeding ground for large marine birds, where they could nest without exposing themselves and their young to continental predators. The appearance and diversification of the kelp, forming kelp forests along the coast of the North Pacific, created a highly productive and nutrient rich environment, that might have been beneficial for the diversification of plotopterids.

Klallamornis remains are often found in the same deposits than two of its relatives, Tonsala and Olympidytes. From the deposits of the Pysht Formation where Klallamornis abyssa and K. buchanani were collected, several early whales have been discovered, like the stem-mysticetes Borealodon osedax and Sitsqwaik cornishorum, and the aetiocetid Fucaia goedertorum. The large desmostylian Behemotops proteus is also known from this formation, like the early seal Pinnarctidion bishopi. Small-sized shorebirds similar to the modern genus Calidris are also found in the same formation, and the early procellariiform Mahakala mirae is known from the underlying Makah Formation.

Similarly to its relative Tonsala, the decayed corpses of Klallamornis buchanani in the Pysht Formation were consumed by the bone-eating worms Osedax, a genus only known today to feed on the corpses of large marine mammals like whales.

=== Use of gastroliths ===
Pebbles found in association with the Whiskey Creek K. buchanani and with the holotype of K. abyssa may indicate that Klallamornis may have consumed pebbles to serve as gastroliths, for reasons yet unknown, like modern penguins, and its relative Olympidytes. The reason for the use of gastroliths by plotopterids, as well as modern penguins, is still unknown, although some have proposed that modern penguins swallow pebbles to aid in their digestion by crushing and grinding their food, to ballast themselves in the water column and regulate their buoyancy, to eliminate their stomach parasites, or to avoid the atrophy of their stomach during the long fasting periods caused by the molting process and the reproduction.

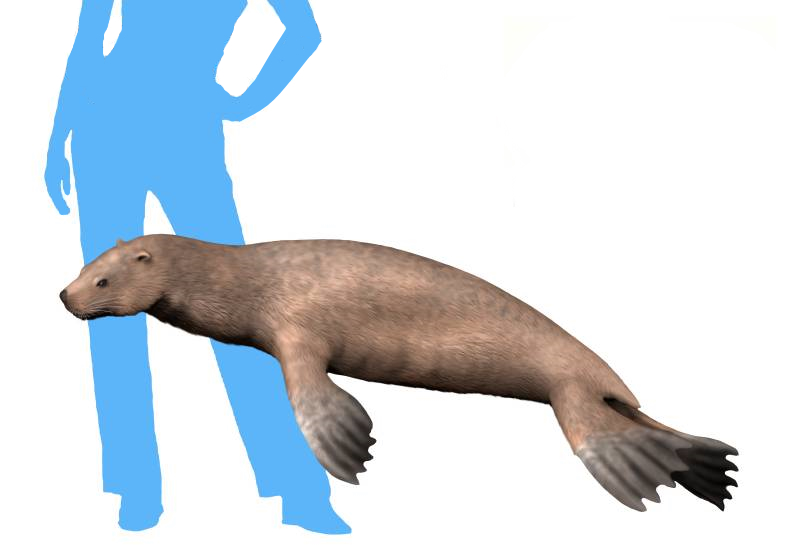
The early seal Enaliarctos. The apparition of seals in the North Pacific may have contributed to the extinction of plotopterids.

=== Extinction ===
Large sized plotopterids, like ?K. clarki, disappears from the fossil record of the Pacific Northwest during the Late Oligocene, and neither of the known specimens from the Pysht Formation, which has yielded numerous specimens of late Oligocene American plotopterids, were larger in size than K. abyssa. Global changes in the temperature of the oceans and the erosion of the offshore volcanic islands on which they nested may have caused the extinction of large-sized, and eventually all genera of plotopterids. It has also been suggested that the preying and competition for food and shelter exerted by the diversification of early seals, like Enaliarctos or Pinnarctidion, into the North Pacific may have been detrimental for the survival of plotopterids. In Late Miocene deposits from California, they were replaced by another unrelated clade of flightless marine birds, the Mancallinae or Lucas auks.
