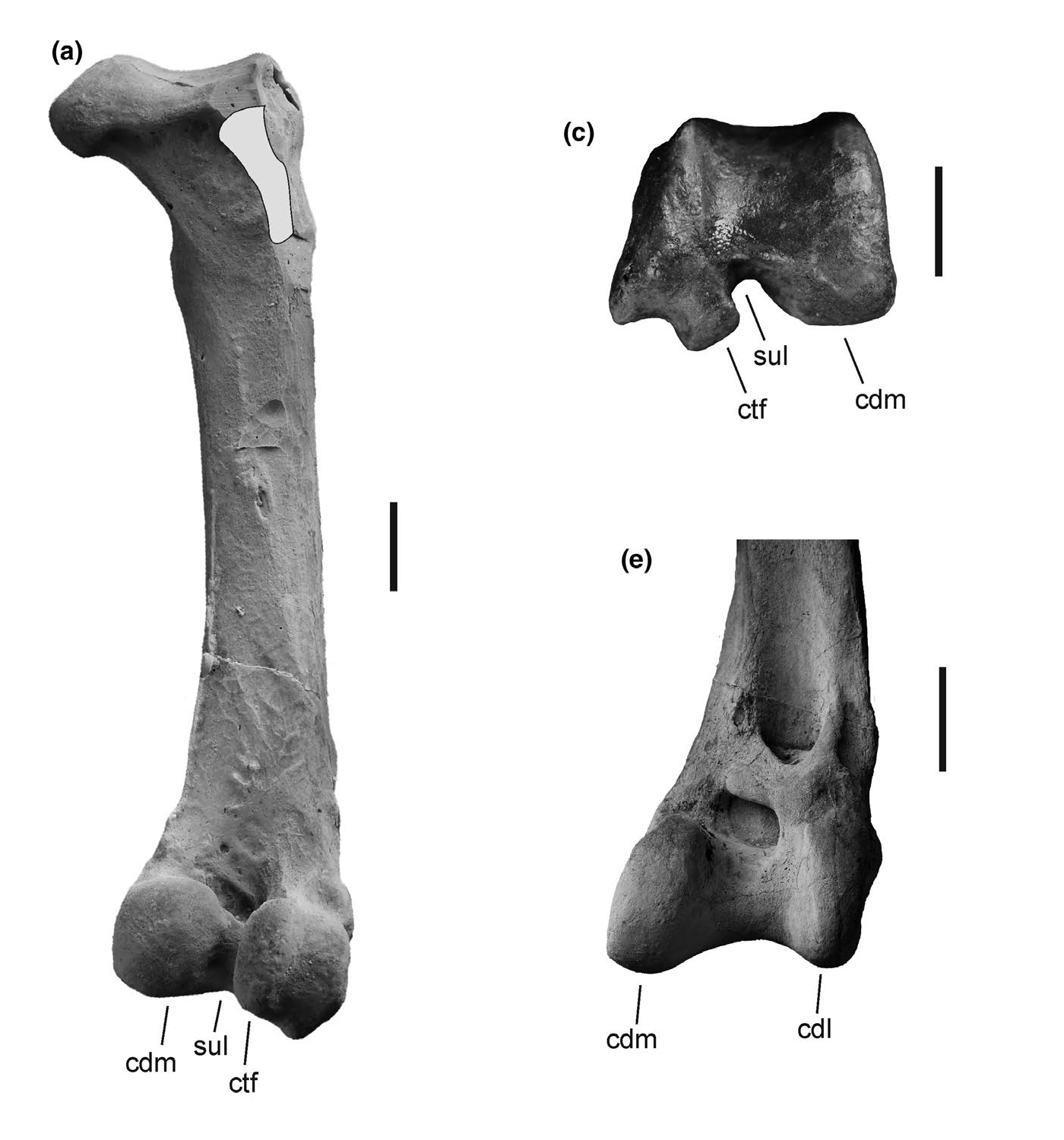
- Femur and distal end of the tibiotarsus of Olympidytes

Scientific classification
- Kingdom: Animalia
- Phylum: Chordata
- Class: Aves
- Order: Suliformes
- Family: †Plotopteridae
- Subfamily: †Tonsalinae
- Genus: †Olympidytes; Mayr & Goedert, 2016

Type species
- Olympidytes thieli Mayr & Goedert, 2016

= Olympidytes =

Olympidytes Temporal range: Late Eocene-Early Oligocene ~Priabonian–Rupelian

Extinct genus of Plotopteridae

Olympidytes is an extinct genus of Plotopteridae, a family of large, flightless marine bird superficially similar to modern penguins but more closely related to cormorants and gannets. It lived during the Late Eocene or the Early Oligocene, in what is today the State of Washington and Japan.

== History and etymology ==
The first specimen attributed to Olympidites, a partial postcranial skeleton, was collected in 2012 by Bruce Thiel in Late Eocene to Early Oligocene sediments from the Lincoln Creek Formation. Another specimen attributed to the genus was collected by James L. Goedert in 2012, from Late Eocene or Early Oligocene rocks from the Jansen Creek member of the Makah Formation, in the southwest of the State of Washington. In 2016, those remains were identified by Goedert and Gerald Mayr as belonging to a new genus and species of plotopterid, which they named Olympidytes thieli, based on the holotype SMF Av 608, the fragmentary skeleton found by Thiel. In 2021, Mori Hirotsugu and Miyata Kazunori tentatively referred to the genus, as cf. Olympidytes sp., a fragmentary right tibiotarsus found in Early Oligocene deposits belonging to the lower member of the Kakinoura Formation near Saikai, Japan. With the redescription of the Japanese remains of Tonsala from Japan as the new genus Stenornis, Olympidytes is the only genus of tonsalin plotopterid known from both sides of the Pacific Ocean. In 2021, a specimen once referred to Tonsala (now Klallamornis) buchanani was redescribed as an indeterminate new species of plotopterid potentially belonging either to the genus Olympidytes or Klallamornis.

=== Etymology ===
The genus name, Olympidytes, is formed from the prefix "Olymp-", referring to the Olympic Peninsula in which the paratype was discovered, and the Ancient Greek "-dytes", meaning "diver". The species name, thieli, was given to honour Bruce Thiel, the collector and donator of the holotype.

== Description ==
Olympidytes was a comparatively small plotopterid, comparable in size with its relative Tonsala. The pygostyle was more typical of that of leg-propelled diving birds like penguins, rather than the elongated shape typical of modern wing-propelled divers, although this can be explained by the function held by the tail in terrestrial locomotion for the modern penguins, absent in plotopterids. The 111.2 cm long femur was intermediate in its stoutness between Tonsala and its larger Japanese relatives Hokkaidornis and Copepteryx. The complete tibiotarsus of the holotype, unique among all plotopterids, was similar but stouter than that of Tonsala. The referred tarsometatarsus, although damaged, lacked a foramen vasculare distale, as in its relative Klallamornis, possibly suggesting that they were sister taxa.

Cf Olympidytes sp., based on the specimen SM-SKT-1153 from Japan, likely represent a new species different from O. thieli. While very similar in size and in shape to the type species, the tibiotarsus lacked a deep groove located on the lateral side of the pons supratendineus where the tandon of the fibularis brevis muscle would attach, a distinctive trait of the genus Olympidytes.

== Palaeoecology ==
Like its relative Klallamornis and modern penguins, Olympidytes is known to swallow pebbles, recovered as gastroliths in association with the holotype.

The presence of a well-developed trochlea cartiginalis tibialis, an adaptation usually present in hindlimb-propelled diving birds, and unusual for the wing-propelled plotopterid, may indicate that Olympidytes and its relative Hokkaidornis were well adapted for both forms of propulsions.

In the Late Eocene to Early Oligocene ocean preserved by the Jansen Creek member of the Makah Formation, Olympidytes coexisted with at least two other species of plotopterids, Klallamornis abyssa and ?Klallamornis clarki. With remains assigned tentatively to Olympidytes discovered in Japan, it is currently the only known genus of plotopterid known from both sides of the Pacific. The diversity of plotopterid on both sides of the Pacific during the Late Eocene and Early Oligocene; the group may have benefited from the global cooling event occurring during the Eocene-Oligocene boundary, which increase the presence of nutrients and the diversity of phytoplankton in seas worldwide.
