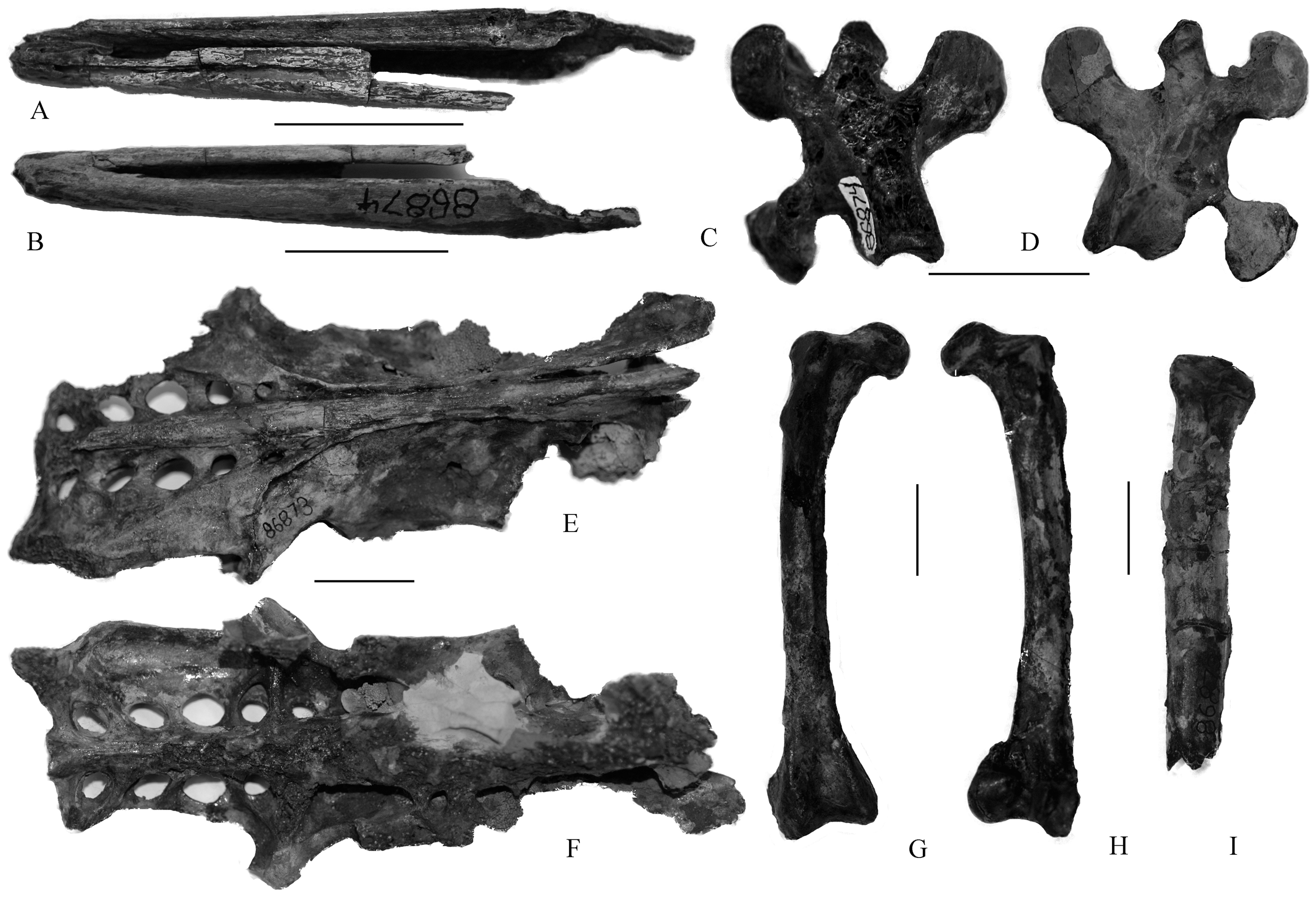
- Dentary, vertebra, pelvis, femur and tibiotarsus referred to Tonsala hildegardae

Scientific classification
- Kingdom: Animalia
- Phylum: Chordata
- Class: Aves
- Order: Suliformes
- Family: †Plotopteridae
- Subfamily: †Tonsalinae
- Genus: †Tonsala; Olson, 1980

Type species
- Tonsala hildegardae Olson, 1980

= Tonsala =

Tonsala Temporal range: Oligocene ~33–22 Ma

Extinct genus of Plotopteridae

Tonsala is an extinct genus of Plotopteridae, a family of flightless seabird similar in biology with penguins, but more closely related to modern cormorants. The genus is known from terrains dated from the Late Oligocene of the State of Washington and Japan.

== History and Etymology ==
In 1979, Storrs L. Olson and Hasegawa Yoshikazu identified several fossilized specimens of Late Oligocene and Early Miocene birds found in the State of Washington and in Japan as members of the family Plotopteridae, but distinct enough from Plotopterum in their general anatomy to warrant their own genus. The Washington fossils, collected by Douglas Emlong in Late Oligocene terrains of the Pysht Formation, in the north of the Olympic Peninsula, were formally described the next year, 1980, by Olson himself, as the type of the new genus and species Tonsala hildegardae. Olson ascribed to the genus the holotype USNM 256518, an incomplete specimen comprising a fragmentary humerus, fragments of a distal wing, a patella and a pectoral girdle. In 1996, while describing Copepteryx, Olson and Hasegawa tentatively assigned a 16.5 cm coracoid from the late Oligocene of Hikoshima, Japan to the genus, much larger than the coracoid of T. hildegardae and almost as long as that of C. hexeris. It was then the first appearance of the genus Tonsala in Japan. In 2000, James L. Goedert and John Cornish referred to the type species two newly discovered specimens collected respectively in 1984 and 1986 in the lower part of the Pysht Formation, near the type locality of the holotype, and including two pelvis, fragmentary vertebral, forelimb and hindlimb remains, and portions of the dentary. In 2011, Gareth J. Dyke, Xia Wang and Michael B. Habib proposed a new species based on Oligocene fossils found in the Pysht Formation and the underlying Makah Formation, Tonsala buchanani. In 2015, three new specimens, including two additional cranial remains, of Tonsala hildegardae, collected respectively in 1985, 1989 and 2008 by James L. Goedert in Oligocene sediments from the Pysht Formation, were described by Gerald Mayr, Goedert and Olaf Vogel. In 2016, Mayr and Goedert referred two additional specimens from the Late Eocene to Early Oligocene of the Jansen Creek Member of the Makah Formation to the genus Tonsala, including one partial pelvis collected in 2004 by Goedert, tentatively assigned to T. hildegardae, and a right coracoid collected in 2009 by D. W. Starr tentatively referred to the genus as ?Tonsala sp., and suggested that T. buchanani represented more than one species and had been incorrectly attributed to the genus Tonsala. In 2017, Mayr and Goedert used Tonsala as the type genus of the new clade Tonsalinae, comprising all derived Plotopterids, aside from the primitive and fragmentary Phocavis and the small-sized Stemec and Plotopterum; they additionally referred to the genus, as a new specimen of T. hildegardae, a partial skeleton including most notably the first known tarsometatarsus assigned to the genus. In 2019, the Japanese remains assigned tentatively to a new species of Tonsala by Olson and Hasegawa in 1996 were redescribed and assigned to a new genus and species, Stenornis kanmonensis In 2021, T. buchanani was moved to the genus Klallamornis by Mayr and Goedert, as K. buchanani, becoming the new type species of the genus. Additional criticism of Dyke et al, 2016 led to a reevaluation of the specimens assigned to Tonsala; one of the partial skeletons referred to the type species by Dyke et al. was only tentatively referred by Mayr and Goedert, as cf. Tonsala hildegardae.

=== Etymology ===
The genus name, Tonsala, is constructed with the Latin prefix "Tonsa-", meaning "oar", and the suffix "-ala", meaning wing, referencing the adaptation of its forelimbs as a swimming apparatus; the species name, hildegardae, was given to honour Hildegarde Howard, the American paleontologist who described Plotopterum.

== Description ==
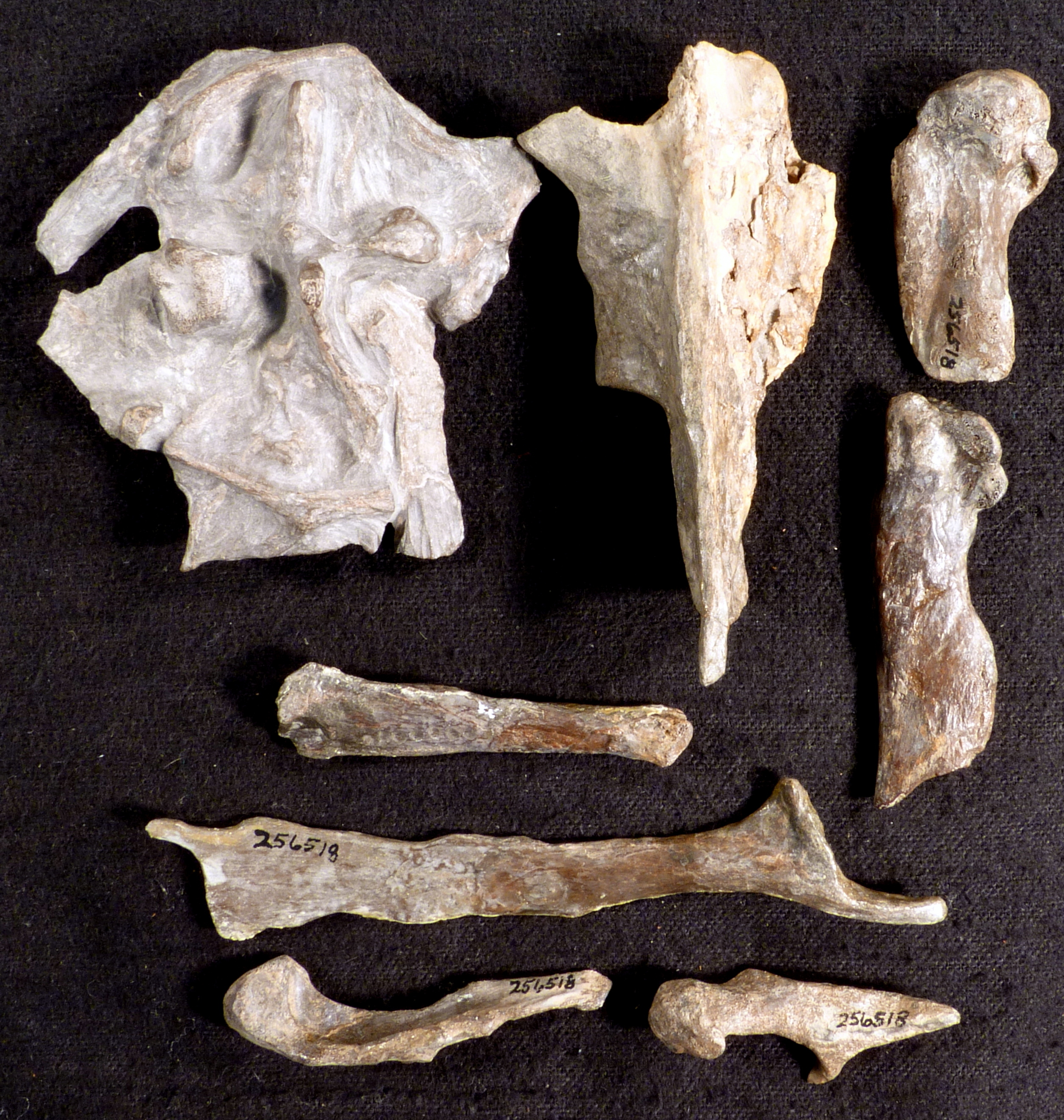
Holotype of Tonsala hildegardae.

Tonsala hildegardae was a large and flightless seabird, comparable in size with a great penguin, and larger than its later relative Plotopterum. Its relatively slender femur tends to indicate that it was the sister taxa of a group including all plotopterids, aside from Phocavis and Plotopterum; it has been suggested that Phocavis maritimus may be synonymous with Tonsala hildegardae. The genus was heavily adapted towards swimming and diving; the wings were paddle-shaped, and the scapula had a thin and expanded blade, similar to that of penguins, to help the animal propel through water. The structure of the wing, and notably the shape of the humerus and radius, shared more resemblances with early penguins and flightless auks like Pinguinus and Mancalla than with the related Pelecaniformes, in a case of convergent evolution. The appearance of the ulnare also indicates the relatively low flexibility of the distal region of the wings. The ulna itself shared similarities with the unrelated Paleocene penguin Waimanu. However, the genus retains some pelecaniform characteristics, such as an elongated acromion on the scapula, although thinner than its modern relatives, and the distinctive plotopterid coracoid was similar to those of gannets, while the ossified patella, only element known about the hindlimbs of the genus, was more reminiscent of darters. Aside of its larger size, it is differentiated from Plotopterum through the more elongated glenoid facet, the lack of sinuation on the sternal margin, the projection of the furcular facet and the long and narrow coracohumeral surface. Its femur was much larger than that of Plotopterum, and smaller and more elongated than that of Copepteryx and Hokkaidornis. The pelvis of Tonsala was broad and shallow, more elongated than that of Copepteryx, and reduced in its caudal portion; it shared similarities with the pelvis of modern darters, and was characterized by an elongated praeacetabular portion, twice as large than the postacetabular portion. The tibiotarsus was slender than that of Copepteryx and more elongated than those of modern boobies and gannets. The caudal vertebrae were large, twice the size of those of the modern great cormorant. The tarsometatarsus was stouter than that of Phocavis and the hypotarsus had only two developed crests, like in other tonsaline plotopterids. The slanting of the distal articular surfaces of the second and fourth trochleae metatarsorum may be an indication that Tonsala had splayed toes, and possibly webbed feet.

Fossilized skull bones of plotopterids are rare, but the cranium of Tonsala is known from three specimens, including a fragment of the beak associated with postcranial remains and two isolated and poorly preserved skulls comparable in size with the skull of the modern Southern royal albatross and much larger than any extant suliform. The complete beak was presumably proportionally longer than those of its modern relatives, and was opened by elongated and very narrow nostrils, unlike modern Suloids for which the nostrils are greatly reduced or completely absents. The skull was devoid of vomer. The braincase, although badly preserved, was more reminiscent in proportion of those of sulids. The lower mandible was deeply concave and sharing its broadness with modern penguins.

Another undescribed species referred by Mayr and Goedert to the genus as ?Tonsala sp., known from a single right coracoid from the Makah Formation, differs from T. hildegardae mostly by its lesser size.

== Classification ==
Plotopterids as a group were always, since the discovery of the holotype specimen of Plotopterum by Hildegarde Howard, considered as related to modern day cormorants, darters and gannets; the exact status of their relationships with modern taxa is however still debated. In 1980, Olson, describing the first remains of Tonsala as member of the clade Sulae, noted that modern members of the Sulidae family were, more than Phalacrocoracidae and Anhingidae, akin to the expected wing-propelled natation practiced by plotopterids, although in 1996 Olson commented, in a paper co-authored with Hasegawa, that Plotopteridae was either the sister-group of the clade formed Anhingidae and Phalacrocoracidae, or that Phalacrocoracidae was the sister-group of Plotopteridae and Anhingidae, with Sulidae being in both cases an outlier within the clade Sulae, today recombined as Suliformes. In 2004, Gerald Mayr tried to introduce an hypothesis on presumed phylogenetic relationships between the plotopterids and the modern penguins, on the basis of ecological and physiological similarities, as well as an attempt to explain the convergent apparition of Spheniscids in the South Pacific and Plotopterids in the North Pacific during the Eocene; in this hypothesis, Plotopteridae would have been the sister group to Spheniscidae, and their clade would have been the sister clade of modern Suliformes. This hypothesis has since been heavily criticized, and several factors, such as recent progress in molecular DNA analysis in order to study the relationships between extant species, as well as the discovery of the well-preserved, early Spheniscidae Waimanu, that lacked the derived traits present in both modern penguins and plotopterids used to clade them by Mayr, have pushed him to disavow this theory; most researchers considering today that the evolution of wing-propelled diving in penguins, plotopterids and extinct flightless auks is an example of convergent evolution. In 2015, Mayr came to the conclusion that Plotopteridae, on account of several primitive traits not shared with modern Suloids, was the sister taxa of the clade Suloidea, including all modern gannets, cormorants, boobies and darters, and that the clade formed by Plotopteridae and Suloidea was the sister group of Fregatidae, including the modern frigatebirds.

In 2017, Mayr and Goedert proposed a new clade, Tonsalinae, including Tonsala and all larger plotopterids known at the time from the Pacific Northwest and Japan, aside from the incomplete and primitive Phocavis and the smaller Plotopterum and Stemec, the latter of which presumably clading together. Due to the paucity of well-preserved remains, phylogenetic relationships was inferred based on the absence of a foramen vasculare distale on the tarsometatarsus of Tonsala, making it more similar by to those of larger forms like Copepteryx, Hokkaidornis, Olympidytes and Klallamornis than to those of the smaller forms Stemec and Plotopterum. The tarsometatarsus of Phocavis is not known, and relationships with other plotopterids can hardly been inferred.

Within Tonsalinae, Tonsala was perceived as the most basal member, with, according to Mayr in his 2016 article, two potential phylogenies; the first of which, considering the eventuality of a single origin in the gigantism of Japanese and American plotopterids, would clade Olympidytes as the sister genus of a clade including the larger-sized Klallamornis of North America, from which the Japanese Copepteryx and Hokkaidornis would eventually descend. Another possibility envisioned by Mayr would be a distinction based on the presence or absence of a notch located on the dorsal surface of the tarsometatarsus by the disappearance of the foramen vasculare discale; this distinction would leave two sister clades of derived tonsalines, one including the North American genera, for which the notch is still visible, and the other comprising the Japanese genera, in which the notch has completely disappeared. Those considerations were corroborated in his 2017 article, for which he preferred the first hypothesis, based on the size of the tarsometatarsus; the phylogenetic tree proposed in the article being as follows:

- Plotopteridae
  - Stemec
  - Plotopterum
  - Phocavis
  - - Tonsalinae
      - Tonsala
      - - Olympidytes
        - - Klallamornis
          - Copepteryx
          - Hokkaidornis

== Palaeoecology ==
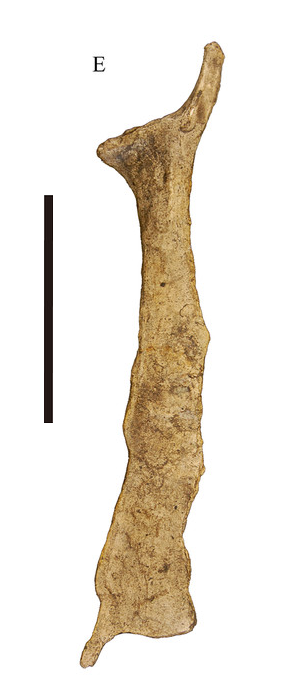
Right scapula of Tonsala hildegardae.

Although it was much larger than modern cormorants and darters, Tonsala was one of the smallest and the most common plotopterid living alongside the coast of the Pacific Northwest during the Oligocene. In the Pysht Formation, remains of Tonsala hildegardae are found associated with those of primitive cetaceans like the stem-mysticete Borealodon and the Aetiocetidae Fucaia, shorebirds related to the genus Calidris, the Desmostylian Behemotops, and the plotopterids Klallamornis buchanani and K. abyssa. In the Late Eocene to early Oligocene Makah Formation, at least two species of Tonsala coexisted with their relative Klallamornis abyssa, with another undescribed species of smaller plotopterid and with the basal procellariiform Makahala mirae.

The compressed wing elements and the extended scapular blade of Tonsala indicates that it was likely capable of producing wing upstroke movements to propulsate itself in water, with a force comparable to that of modern penguins, and proportionally stronger than that produced by its smaller distant relative Plotopterum. The enlarged patella present in the hindlimbs of Tonsala indicates that plotopterid assumed an upright posture on land, like modern penguins and cormorants. Tonsaline plotopterids have been recovered in deep sea deposits from both coasts of the North Pacific, and it is assumed that they were pelagic foragers. They may have nested in offshore volcanic islands, where they could raise their young sheltered from the diversifying mammalian predators.

Based on two fragmentary skeletons of plotopterids, including one of Tonsala, it has been demonstrated that the bone-eating detritivorous worm Osedax, today specialized in the consumption of Cetacean corpses, used to have a more diverse diet and to also be able to feed on the remains of large marine birds. Cow sharks teeth have also been recovered in association with Tonsala remains, suggesting they also fed on the carcasses of plotopterids.

The extinction of Tonsala, alongside that of all of the plotopterids from the Pacific Northwest during the Late Oligocene can be explained by a combination of factors, including the disappearance of the numerous offshore volcanic islands present along the Cascadian coast and presumably used for nidification, the warming of the oceans leading to a dwindling of the native food ressources, and the apparition in North Pacific marine environments of early pinnipeds like Enaliarctos, that may have competed with plotopterids for food, breeding sites, and preyed upon them.
