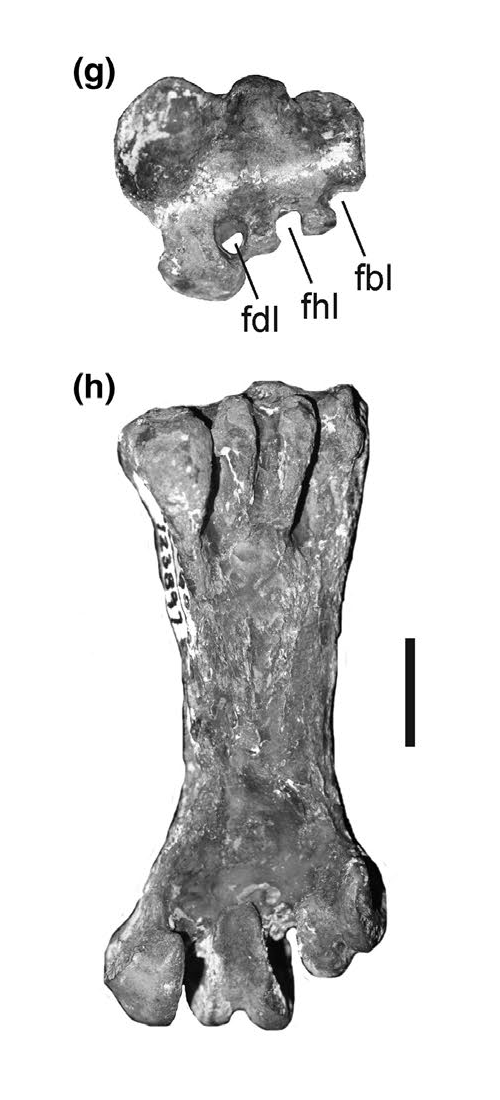
- Tarsometatarsus of Phocavis maritimus

Scientific classification
- Kingdom: Animalia
- Phylum: Chordata
- Class: Aves
- Order: Suliformes
- Family: †Plotopteridae
- Genus: †Phocavis; Goedert, 1988

Type species
- Phocavis maritimus Goedert, 1988

= Phocavis =

Phocavis Temporal range: Late Eocene (Priabonian) ~38–33.9 Ma

Extinct genus of Plotopteridae

Phocavis is an extinct genus of flightless seabird, belonging to the family Plotopteridae, and distantly related with modern cormorants. Its fossils, found in the Keasey Formation in Oregon, are dated from the Late Eocene.

== History and Etymology ==
The holotype of Phocavis, LACM 123897, an isolated right tarsometatarsus, was collected in Late Eocene rocks belonging to the Keasey Formation, near Vernonia, Oregon, by James L. Goedert in 1979. The fossil was only described in 1988 as a new genus and species of Plotopteridae, Phocavis maritimus. Due to the lack of existing material on the two described genera of North American plotopterids, Tonsala and Plotopterum, the validity of the genus was only assumed due to the assumed size of the living bird, estimated to be intermediate between the two later genera, and its much older geological age. Comparison could however be made with the then undescribed remains of Copepteryx from Japan to verify the identity of the bone as a fossil of plotopterid. In 2004, in an heavily criticized article in which he considered the Spheniscidae to be related to Suliformes based on their shared similarities with plotopterids, Gerald Mayr noted that the tarsometatarsus of Phocavis shared similarities with that of the Eocene frigatebird Limnofregata, and tentatively assigned Phocavis as the sister taxon of a clade including plotopterids and modern-day penguins. These affirmations have later been rebutted, on the basis of the more robust and larger shape of the bone, as well as similarities with more derived plotopterids. In 2016, Gerald Mayr and James L. Goedert suggested that some of the remains attributed to Phocavis were virtually indifferentiable from those of its later relative, Tonsala hildegardae.

=== Etymology ===
The genus name, Phocavis, is constructed with the Latin prefix "Phoca-", meaning seal, and the suffix "-avis", meaning bird, as a reference of its supposed adaptation towards swimming. The type species name, maritimus, means in Latin "from the sea".

== Description ==
Phocavis is only known from its holotype tarsometatarsus, which could be identified as belonging to a new genus of plotopterid thanks to comparison with fossil remains of large plotopterids from Japan. The 60 mm large tarsometatarsus was much smaller than its Japanese counterparts, but larger than its later relative Plotopterum maritimus. It was also more elongated, and anatomically distinct from the Japanese plotopterids. The primitiveness of the tarsometatarsus compared to that of the latter Copepteryx indicates that Phocavis represented a considerably primitive form compared to its Oligocene counterparts.

== Paleoenvironment ==
Phocavis is the earliest and presumably most basal known genus of plotopterid, dating from the Late Eocene. The Keasey Formation, in which it was found, represents deep sea deposits, at an approximate deposition depth of 500 to 1000 m, possibly indicating that plotopterids were able to venture far from the coast early in their evolution. In the Eocene of this formation are also represented a pseudodontorn, a marine turtle, a cetacean, teleost fish and sharks. The cohabitation between plotopterids and early cetaceans since the Eocene goes against an earlier theory justifying the extinction of the plotopterids during the Miocene by an unequal concurrence with porpoises, and may designate other culprits, such as the dramatic climatic and oceanographic changes in the North Pacific during the Early and Middle Miocene, affecting phytoplanktonic communities and causing the extinction of the specialized plotopterids, in favor of other group such as the enaliarctine pinnipeds. Phocavis was contemporaneous of at least one other distinct species of plotopterid, colloquially known as the "Whiskey Creek plotopterid", from the Late Eocene of the Makah Formation.
