= Pysht Formation =

- Stratigraphic range: Late Oligocene, Chattian
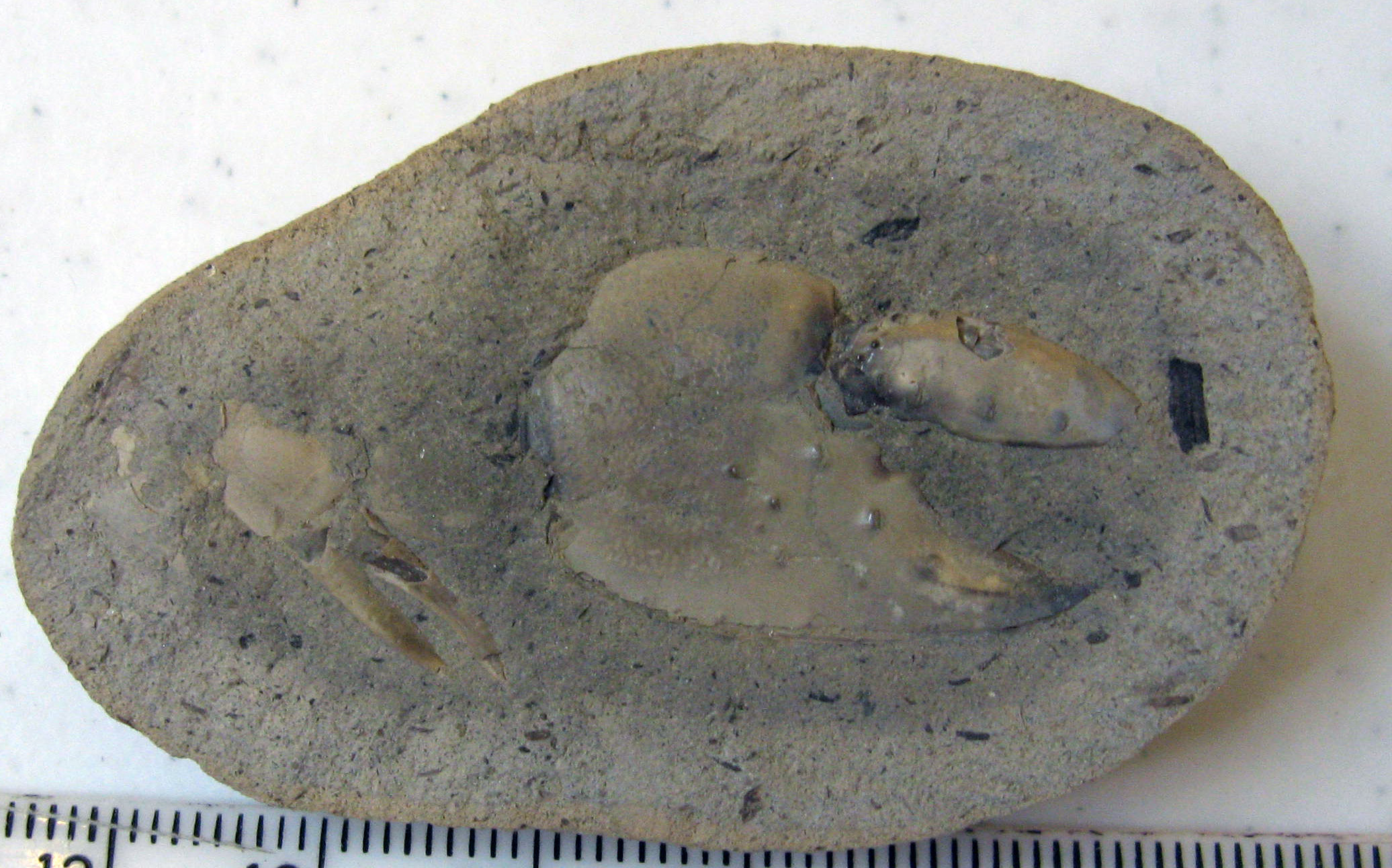
- Fossil Callianopsis from the Pysht Formation
- Type: Geological formation
- Unit of: Twin River Group
- Underlies: Clallam Formation
- Overlies: Makah Formation

Lithology
- Primary: Siltstone, mudstone, conglomerate

Location
- Coordinates: 48.2°N 123.9°W
- Approximate paleocoordinates: 47.8°N 114.9°W
- Region: Washington
- Country: United States

Type section
- Named for: Pysht River

The Pysht Formation is a geologic formation in Washington (state). It preserves fossils dating back to the Paleogene period, which appear to have been deposited in an offshore marine environment. Outcrops are present on the northern Olympic Peninsula, in Clallam County.

== Fossil content ==
Based on the Paleobiology Database:

=== Cartilaginous fish ===
Cartilaginous fish of the Pysht Formation
| Genus | Species | Presence | Material | Notes | Images |
|---|---|---|---|---|---|
| Somniosus | S. gonzalezi | | | A sleeper shark. | |

=== Mammals ===
Mammals of the Pysht Formation
| Genus | Species | Presence | Material | Notes | Images |
|---|---|---|---|---|---|
| cf. Allodesmus | A. sp. | | | A desmatophocid pinniped. | |
| Behemotops | B. proteus | | | The most basal known desmostylian. Type locality for genus and species. | |
| Borealodon | B. oseax | | | A stem-baleen whale. Type locality for genus and species. | |
| Fucaia | F. goedertorum | | | An aetiocetid baleen whale. | |
| ?Kronokotherium | K. sp. | | | A desmostylian. | |
| Olympicetus | O. avitus | | Two partial skulls belonging to a juvenile and a neonate, including part of the dentition and a tympanic bulla | A simocetid toothed whale. Type locality for genus and species. | |
| Olympicetus | O. thalassodon | | Posterior part of skull | A simocetid toothed whale. Type locality for genus and species. | |
| Pinnarctidion | P. iverseni | | A nearly complete skull and limited postcrania (SDSNH 146624). | A pan-pinniped. | |
| Sitsqwayk | S. cornishorum | | Partial skull, tympanic bullae, mandibles and postcrania. | An basal baleen whale. Type locality for genus and species. | |

=== Birds ===
Birds of the Pysht Formation
| Genus | Species | Presence | Material | Notes | Images |
|---|---|---|---|---|---|
| Klallamornis | K. buchanani | | | A plotopterid suliform. | |
| Tonsala | T. hildegardae | | | A plotopterid suliform. | |

=== Crustaceans ===
Crustaceans of the Pysht Formation
| Genus | Species | Presence | Material | Notes | Images |
|---|---|---|---|---|---|
| Upogebia | U. barti | Locality RB 18. | Multiple specimens. | An upogebiid mud shrimp. | |

== See also ==
- List of fossiliferous stratigraphic units in Washington (state)
- Paleontology in Washington (state)
