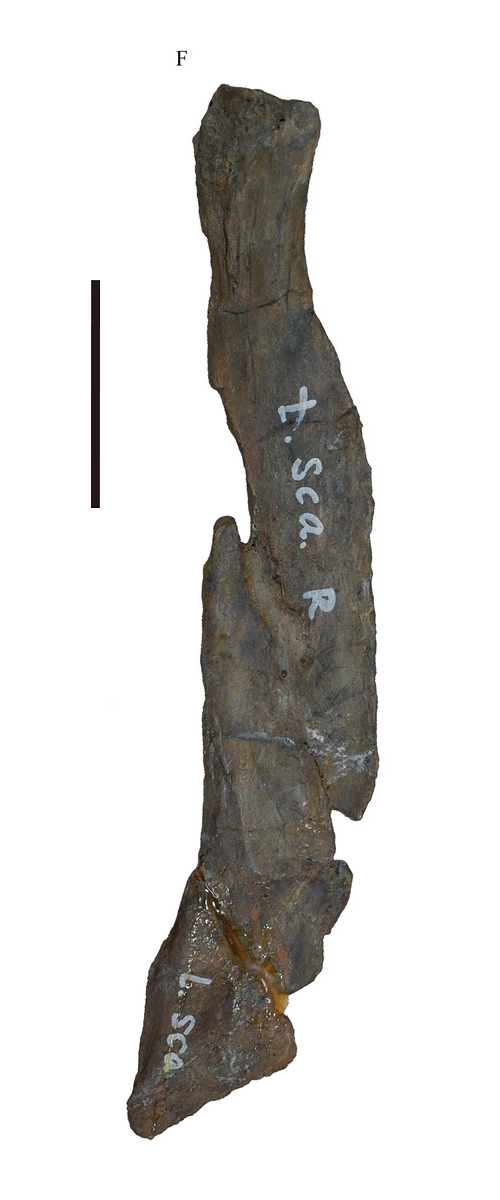
- Right scapula of Hokkaidornis abashiriensis

Scientific classification
- Kingdom: Animalia
- Phylum: Chordata
- Class: Aves
- Order: Suliformes
- Family: †Plotopteridae
- Subfamily: †Tonsalinae
- Genus: †Hokkaidornis; Sakurai et al. 2008

Type species
- †Hokkaidornis abashiriensis Sakurai et al. 2008

= Hokkaidornis =

Hokkaidornis Temporal range: Late Oligocene ~29–24 Ma

Extinct genus of birds

Hokkaidornis is an extinct genus of penguin-like plotopterid from the Late Oligocene of Hokkaido, Japan.

== History and etymology ==
The first Hokkaidornis remains were discovered in sediments dated from the Late Oligocene of the Tokoro Formation, near the city of Abashiri, in the Japanese island of Hokkaido, and had been identified as the remains of a yet-unidentified genus and species of plotopterid in 1998. In 2008, Kazuhiko Sakurai, Masaichi Kimura and Takayuki Katoh described the new genus and species Hokkaidornis abashiriensis, using as holotype the specimen AMP 44, a semi-complete skeleton lacking the skull.

=== Etymology ===
The genus name, Hokkaidornis, is constructed from Hokkaido, the island in which the holotype was discovered, and the ancient Greek suffix -ornis, meaning "bird". The species name, abashiriensis, refers to the town of Abashiri, near which it was found; the city name itself meaning "to be discovered in rock" in the native Ainu language.

== Description ==
Hokkaidornis was a large-bodied plotopterid, with estimated height of 1.3 metres (4.3 ft) and length of 1.7 metres (5.6 ft), roughly the size of its relative Copepteryx hexeris. The anterior ends of the furcula are more reminiscent of those found in Anhinga than those of Phalacrocoracidae. The sternal end of the coracoid, only part of the coracoid preserved in the holotype specimen, had a more angular sterno-coracoidal process, differing it from Copepteryx and Tonsala. The well-preserved scapula was similar to that of Tonsala. The partially preserved humerus was more elongated than that of Tonsala, and had a shaft more sinuous than that of Copepteryx, and similar to that of Tonsala. The radius was flattened like in other plotopterid, while the ulna was the largest known for plotopterids. The pelvis shared similarities with those of modern anhingas. The femur was more robust than that of Tonsala, and had a more bowed shaft and a more bulbous head than those of both species of Copepteryx, although it resembled, as well than the tibiotarsus, those of some specimens referred tentatively to Copepteryx by Olson and Hasegawa. The patella was remarkably heavy. The tarsometatarsus was more robust and less elongated than in Phocavis, but was nearly undistinguishable to that of the paratype of C. hexeris, and quite similar to those of modern-day penguins.

== Paleobiology ==
Hokkaidornis had a well-developed trochlea cartilaginis tibialis on its tarsometatarsus, a character mostly known from hindlimb-propelled marine birds. That development may indicate that Hokkaidornis was not only adapted towards wing-propelled swimming like most other plotopterids, but also able to propel itself through water with its hindlimbs, a characteristic also present in its relative Olympidytes.

The preservation of ripple marks on sandstones found in the vicinity of the holotype and the presence of the bivalves Periploma yokoyamai and Yoldia, the gastropod Turritella and the scaphopod Dentalium in association with the specimen indicates that Hokkaidornis lived in a shallow marine environment.
