= Makahala =

Makahala Temporal range: Eocene–Oligocene

Scientific classification
- Kingdom: Animalia
- Phylum: Chordata
- Class: Aves
- Order: Procellariiformes
- Genus: †Makahala
- Species: †M. mirae

Binomial name
- †Makahala mirae Mayr, 2015

Extinct genus of procellariiform bird

Makahala is an extinct monotypic genus of procellariiform bird that lived in North America during the latest Eocene and earliest Oligocene epochs.

== Etymology ==
The generic name Makahala is derived from the Makah Formation, the geologic formation in which the type specimen was found, and the Latin word 'ala', meaning wing. The specific epithet of the type and only species, Makahala mirae, references Mira Vogel, the daughter of Olaf Vogel, a preparator at the Senckenberg Museum.
