= Lincoln Creek Formation =

- Stratigraphic range: Late Eocene-Early Miocene; 35.1–22 Ma
- Type: Formation
- Unit of: Belgian Basin
- Underlies: Astoria Formation
- Overlies: Skookumchuck Formation, Humptulips Formation
- Thickness: 3,000 metres (9,800 ft)

Lithology
- Primary: mudstone, sandstone, siltstone
- Other: conglomerate, pyroclastic rock

Location
- Region: Washington
- Country: United States

Type section
- Named for: Lincoln Creek (Chehalis River tributary)

Lincoln Creek Formation (originally known as the Lincoln Formation) is a geologic formation in the state of Washington. It is part of the Belgian Basin and preserves fossils dating to between the Late Eocene-Early Miocene, recording an almost complete sequence between the two. The formation overlies the Skookumchuck and Humptulips Formations and underlies the Astoria Formation. It preserves a marine shelf and slope environment with multiple methane seep communities containing coral, sponges, mollusks, and rare echinoderms.

== Discovery and naming ==
The first locality of the Lincoln Creek formation was found, as the name suggests, at Lincoln Creek which is located within Lincoln County, Washington. Due to the outcrops being small in the area, the type locality of the formation is located in an area along the Chehalis River which consists of around 366 m of offshore marine strata. The formation was originally named the Lincoln formation by Weaver in 1912 though that name was already used for the Lincoln Porphyry, an Eocene deposit in Colorado.

== Description ==
The Lincoln Creek formation is a wide-spanning formation in Washington with numerous outcrops spanning from the Columbia River to Olympic Mountains; measurement of the formation suggest in spans are 3885 square kilometers. The most complete sections of the formation are found throughout the rivers and streams of this expansive area. This is due to these bodies of water cutting into the formation almost perpendicularly, which also allows the nearly-continuous stratigraphic series to be exposed. In these sections, the Lincoln Creek formation is around 3000 m thick. The thickness of the formation increases as one goes west and north within the basin.

The formation is largely made up of mudstone and siltstone with the sandstone more common in the lower strata of the formation ranging from fine to very-fine grained. Within the strata, there are also thin layers of calcareous concretions, basaltic sandstone, glauconitic sandstone, and structureless mudstone present. One notable feature of the lithology is the fact that in on the eastern edges, pyroclastic rock is present within a largely basaltic sandstone member. Along with that, small sections of limestone are present due to hydrocarbon seeps that were in the area during time of deposition. The basal most 122 meters of the formation in made up of tuffaceous sandstone and sandy siltstone which overlies the Eocene Skookumchuck Formation.

== Paleobiota ==
=== Anthozoa ===
Genus	Species	Notes	Image
Archohelia	A? sp.		
Caryophyllia	C. wynoocheensis		
Deltocyathus	D. insperatus		
Dendrophyllia	D. hannibali		
Flabellum	F. hertleini		
Flabellum	F. sp.		
Graphularia	'G'? aff. sasai		
Radicipes	R? sp.		
Stephanocyathus	S. holcombensis		

=== Annelida ===
Genus	Species	Notes	Image
Metavermilia	M. gollieti		
Worm Tubes		Tubes produced by worms with some being similar to those made by the genus Escarpia.	

=== Aves ===
Genus	Species	Notes	Image
Diomedavus	D. knapptonensis		
Plotopteridae Gen. et sp. indet.			

=== Crustacea ===
Genus	Species	Notes	Image
Callianassa	'C' knapptonensis		
Callianassa	'C' porterensis		
Macrocyprinidae indet.			
Pulalius	P. vulgaris		
Xylocythere	X. sp.		

=== Echinodermata ===
Genus	Species	Notes	Image
Asteroidea indet.			
Isocrinidae indet.			
Spatangoida indet.			

=== Mollusca ===
Genus	Species	Notes	Image
Acharax	A. sp.		
Acila	A. nehalemensis		
Acteon	A. sp.		
Archivesica	A. knapptonensis		
Aturia	A. angustata		
Bathybembix	B. sp.		
Benthomangelia	B. sp.		
Buccinidae indet.			
Cadulus	C. sp.		
Cancellaria	C? sp.		
Cocculinidae indet.			
Conchocele	C. bisecta		
Craspedochiton	C. eernissei		
Cryptonatica	C. cf. pittsburgensis		
Cylichna	C. sp.		
Dentalium	D. cf. laneensis		
Dentalium	D. porterensis		
Depressigyra	D? statura		
Ennucula	E. sp.		
Exilia	E. sp		
Fulgoraria	F. ellenmoreae		
Gemmula	G? sp.		
Granula	G? sp.		
Halystina	H. sp.		
Idas	I. sp.		
Ischnochiton	I. goederti		
Leptochiton	L. alveolus		
Lepidochitona	L. lioplax		
Lepidochitona	L. washingtonensis		
Lepidopleurus	L. propecajetanus		
Leptogyra	sp.		
Limopsis	L. nitens		
Liracassis	L. sp.		
Lucinoma	L. sp.		
Margaritidae indet.			
Modiolidae indet.			
Muricidae indet.			
Natica	N. sp.		
Natica	N? weaveri		
Nipponothracia	N. sp.		
Nucula	N. vokesi		
Nuculana	'N' sp. aff. 'N' grasslei		
Oenopota	O. sp.		
Parasyrinx	P. sp.		
Pleurotomella	P? sp.		
Propeamussium	P. sp.		
Ptychosyrinx	P. sp.		
Provanna	P. antiqua		
Ringicula	R. pinguis		
Scaphander	S. impunctatus		
Scaphander	S. sp.		
Scaphandridae indet.			
Skeneidae indet.			
Solariella	S? sp.		
Squiresica	S. knapptonensis		
Tectonatica	T. sp		
Tindaria	T. sp		
Trophonopsis	T? sp.		
Vesicomya	V. sp.		
Xyloredo	X. sp.		

=== Mammalia ===
Genus	Species	Notes	Image
Mysticeti indet.		Multiple teeth have been found at the formation with Osedax borings preserved.	

=== Osteichthyes ===
Genus	Species	Notes	Image
Aglyptorhynchus	A. sp		
Diaphus	D? sp.		
Nezumia	N. armentrouti		
Oxygoniolepidus	O. washingtonensis		

=== Porifera ===
Genus	Species	Notes	Image
Eurete	E. goederti?		
Farrea	F? sp.		
Hexactinella	H? conica		
Hexactinella	H? tubula		
Hexactinellidae indet.			

== Paleoenvironment ==
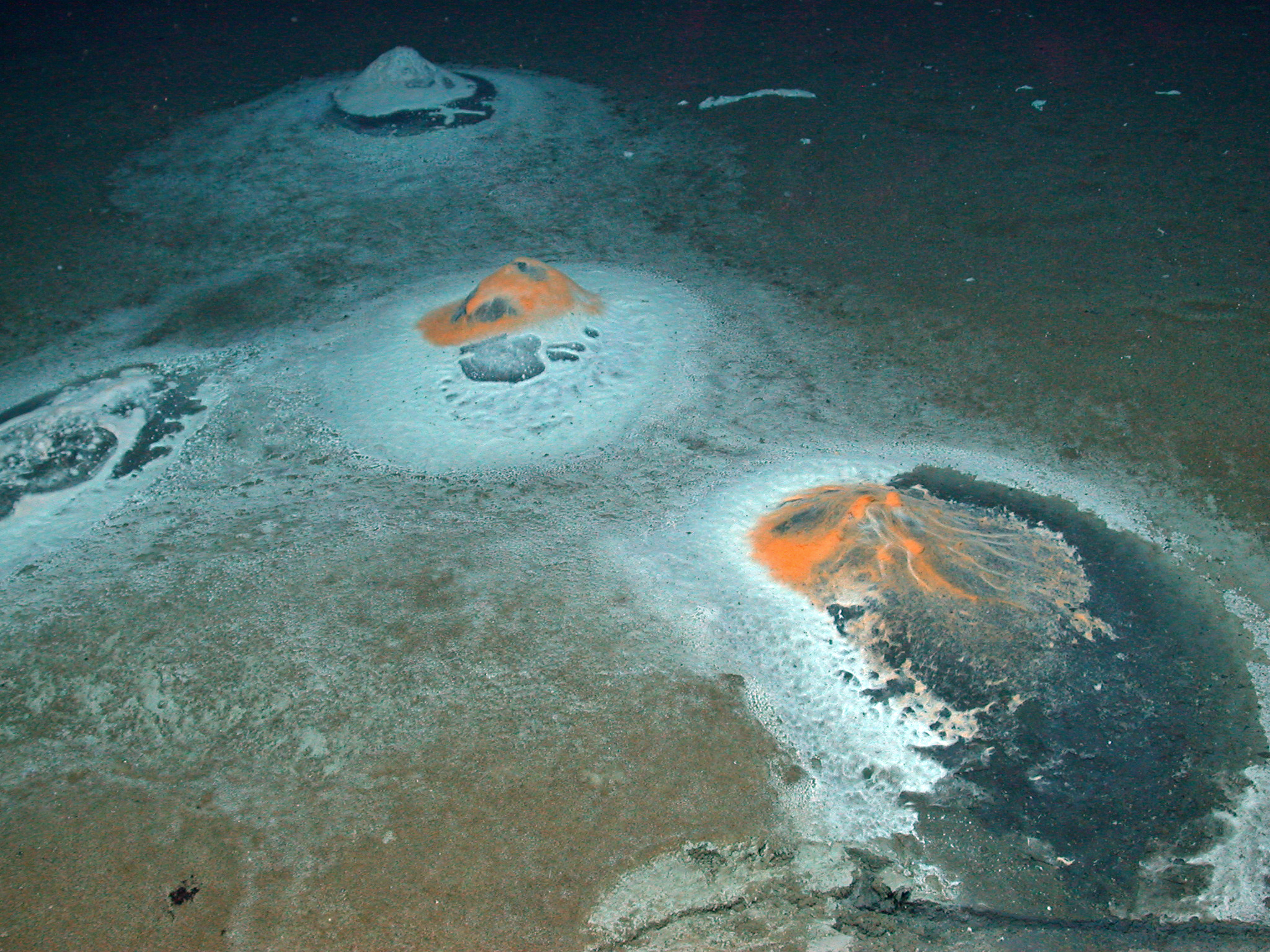
Modern-day methane or cold seep environment

The Lincoln Creek formation represents a continuous marine shelf and shelf slope environment with turbidity currents present. Methane seep deposits have been found within the formation with the microfossils suggesting that these seeps would have been in depths between 400 and 800 m. Within these cold, deep water methane seeps multiple species of coral have been described but notably none of these genera are found in modern day methane seep communities. It has been suggested that, like other animals found at the deposit, these coral could have gotten nutrients from the nearby seeps, though this isn't something seen in living corals. A large number of other invertebrate groups have been found with bivalves and tubeworms making up a large amount of the fauna. Based on the number of taxa found in the formation, these communities would have been highly abundant though lacked a large amount of diversity. Though the microfauna suggests a depth of potentially over 1000 m, the mollusk fauna only suggests that the deposition would have been much shallower, ranging from 100 to 350 m. Evidence of both whale and wood falls have been found at the formation with taxa present in these events today.
