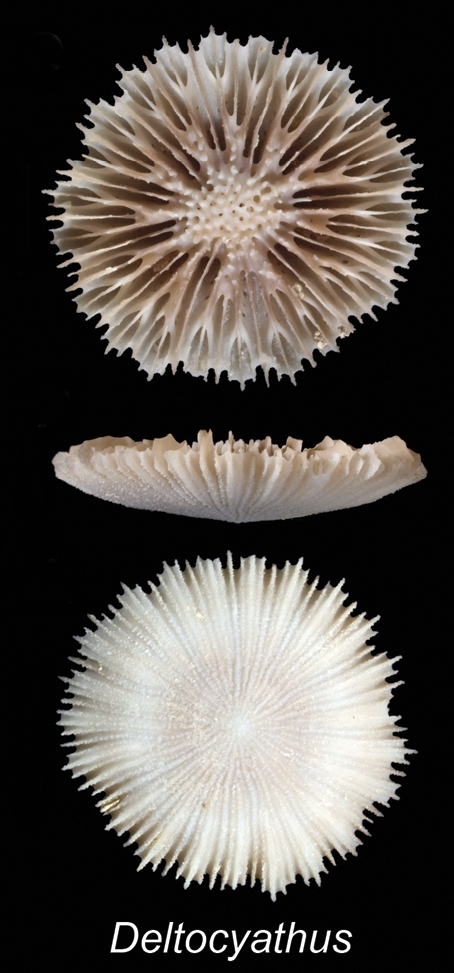
- Deltocyathus rotulus

Scientific classification
- Domain: Eukaryota
- Kingdom: Animalia
- Phylum: Cnidaria
- Class: Hexacorallia
- Order: Scleractinia
- Family: Deltocyathidae
- Genus: Deltocyathus; Milne Edwards & Haime, 1848

= Deltocyathus =

Genus of corals

Deltocyathus is a genus of cnidarians belonging to the monotypic family Deltocyathidae.

The genus has cosmopolitan distribution.

== Species ==
Species:

- Deltocyathus agassizi Pourtalès, 1867
- Deltocyathus alatus Tenison-Woods, 1878
- Deltocyathus aldingensis Tenison-Woods, 1878
