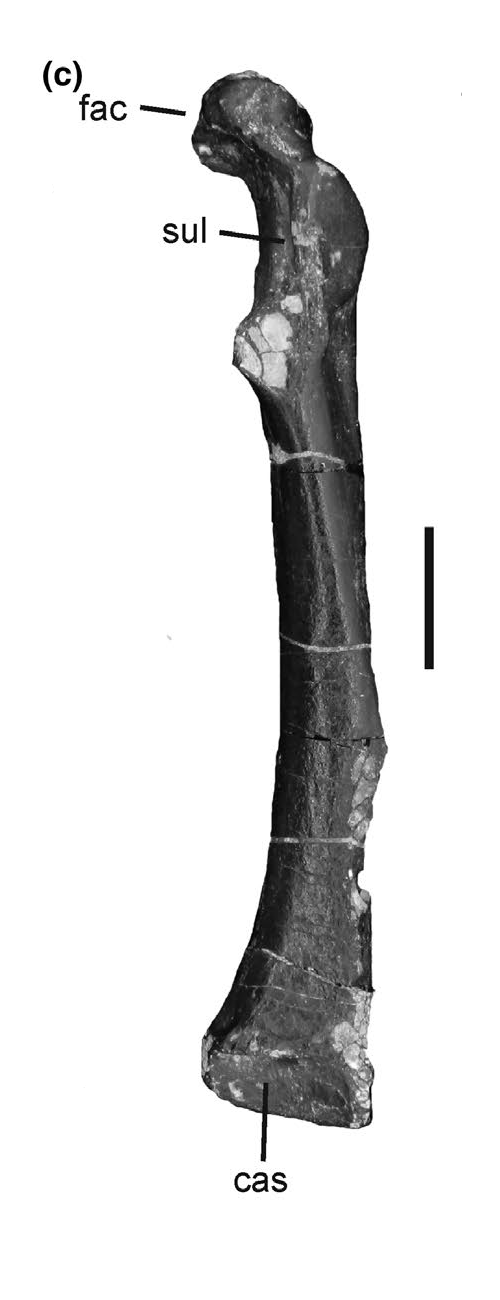
- Coracoid of Stemec suntokum

Scientific classification
- Kingdom: Animalia
- Phylum: Chordata
- Class: Aves
- Order: Suliformes
- Family: †Plotopteridae
- Genus: †Stemec; Kaiser, Watanabe & Johns, 2015

Type species
- Stemec suntokum Kaiser, Watanabe & Johns, 2015

= Stemec =

Stemec Temporal range: Late Oligocene (Rupelian-Chattian) ~24.8–24.1 Ma

Extinct genus of Plotopteridae

Stemec is an extinct genus of Plotopteridae, a family of flightless seabird similar in biology with penguins, but more closely related to modern cormorants. The genus is known from terrains dated from the Late Oligocene Sooke Formation of British Columbia

== History and etymology ==
Although the fossil remains of large marine birds like the Pelagornithid Cyphornis are known from the Sooke Formation of the Oligocene of Vancouver Island since 1894, the first remains of plotopterids from the formation were only discovered in 2013 in the vicinity of Sooke by Leah and Graham Suntok. In 2015, those remains were described by Gary Kaiser, Junya Watanabe and Marji Johns as the new genus and species Stemec suntokum, using as holotype the specimen RBCM.EH2014.032.0001.001, a nearly complete coracoid.

=== Etymology ===
The genus name, Stemec, designate an indefinite long-necked black waterbird in the Coast Salish language native of the area in which the holotype was discovered. The type species name, suntokum, honours the family name of Leah and Graham Suntok, the discoverers of the holotype.

== Description ==
Stemec was a relatively small plotopterid, comparable in size with its Miocene relative Plotopterum. It is only known from a single right coracoid belonging to an adult bird, as proven by the smooth surface of the shaft, although two fragmentary tibiotarsi found in the same locality and similar to those of modern cormorants might have belonged to the genus, or to another small-sized plotopterid. The holotype coracoid is 74.8 mm long, 12.8 mm wide, and fairly complete, although erosion had damaged part of its surface. It shared more similarities with the known coracoid of Plotopterum than with those of the larger Tonsalinae plotopterids like Copepteryx and Tonsala. It was although mostly differenced from Plotopterum by several osteological specificities, including the raised and flat platform formed by the facies articularis humeralis, and the absence of a prominent groove formed by the sulcus supracoracoideus typical of the later genus.

== Palaeobiology ==
During the Oligocene of Vancouver Island, Stemec lived alongside the Desmostylian Cornwallius, the Aetiocetid Chonecetus and the Pelagornithid Cyphornis in a shallow marine environment rich in sessile fauna. The discovery of Stemec and its close relative Plotopterum in coastal deposits indicate that the latest and smallest plotopterids had costal habits, when the larger and older tonsalin plotopterids where pelagic feeders. Elements of their osteology indicates that they were not proficient swimmer like their larger, open sea specialist relatives, which may explain both the apparent lack of competition between larger and smaller plotopterids and the later survival of the latter form.
