= Gareth J. Dyke =

Irish paleontologist

Gareth John Dyke is a paleontologist whose work is concerned with the evolutionary history of birds and their dinosaurian relatives. His specific research interests include the phylogenetics of birds, the functional morphology of aves and non-avian dinosaurs, as well as the paleoenvironments of fossil vertebrates.

The extinct shark Dykeius is named in his honor.

== Early life and education ==
From 2000 to 2002, he was a Chapman Postdoctoral Fellow in Ornithology at the American Museum of Natural History in New York.

== Career ==
Formerly a Senior Lecturer in Vertebrate Paleontology at the University of Southampton, he is currently a researcher in the Department of Evolutionary Zoology and Human Biology at the University of Debrecen, Hungary. He currently holds the title of Research Associate at both the American Museum of Natural History and the National Museum of Ireland.

His main work concerns research on dinosaurs, but also focuses on paleornithology and pterosaurs. He is a strong proponent of the view of dinosaurian origins of birds.

=== Past Research ===
Dyke's research is concerned with "the evolutionary history of birds and their dinosaurian relatives" and encompasses anatomy, phylogenetics, functional morphology, paleoecology, taphonomy, sedimentology, and aerodynamics as well as the analysis and interpretation of large fossil-record datasets.

He has published in Scientific American, Science, and Nature as well as in other leading journals in both biology and earth sciences. He describes his work as being located on "the interface between these two fields".

In 1999, Dyke and a colleague reported that while the "traditional view, based largely on the fossil record," was that most modern birds "did not appear until the Tertiary, after the end-Cretaceous extinction event," new molecular divergence data "suggested that most, or all, of the major clades, were present in the Cretaceous."

In a 2002 article, Dyke and a colleague reported that recent data had yielded "[d]ramatic new perceptions of the life history, growth and development of early birds."

Dyke and three colleagues reported in 2005 that while there has been considerable uncertainty as to the reliability of the fossil record of Mesozoic birds, their analysis had gone "some way towards" resolving the uncertainty.

In 2005, the Times of London quoted Dyke as saying that "fossil evidence that [predatory] dinosaurs were feathered is now 'irrefutable'."

In a 2007 article, Dyke and a colleague described a "small galliform bird from the Lower Eocene Fur Formation in northwestern Denmark."

In 2008, Dyke was one of a team of researchers who discovered "the oldest known parrot fossil – a wing bone from a bird that lived 55 million years ago." The parrot was discovered in Denmark, where at where the climate was tropical at the time. The new species was named Mopsitta tanta, or the Danish Blue Parrot.

Dyke and three colleagues reported in 2009 "that low-cost analysis of satellite image data (derived from Landsat ETM+) can be used efficiently for the 'remote prospecting' of a large field area."

As reported in 2009, Dyke and four colleagues discovered the first dinosaur fossil to be found in Bulgaria.

In 2010, Dyke and a colleague reported in Science Magazine on the flight capabilities of fossil birds Archaeopteryx and Confuciusornis.

In a 2010 Scientific American article entitled "Winged Victory: Modern Birds Now Found to Have Been Contemporaries of Dinosaurs," Dyke reported that "[m]odern birds, long thought to have arisen only after the dinosaurs perished, turn out to have lived alongside them." Noting that "molecular studies and a smattering of equivocal fossil finds have hinted that modern birds might have" originated earlier than previously thought, a recent analysis of "fossils of ancient modern birds confirm this earlier origin, raising the question of why these birds, but not the archaic ones, survived the mass extinction."

In a 2011 Scientific American article entitled "The Dinosaur Baron of Transylvania", Dyke wrote about Franz Nopcsa, "a turn-of-the-century Transylvanian nobleman who loved fossils" and "is well known for having discovered and described some of the first dinosaurs from Central Europe," and whose "theories about dinosaur evolution turn out to have been decades ahead of their time... Only in the past few years, with new fossil discoveries, have scientists begun to appreciate how right he was." Also in 2011, Dyke and Evgeny Kurochkin described Eostrix tsaganica found in Mongolia, the first find of this primitive owl in Asia.

It was reported in January 2013 that a European/Chinese team including Dyke had discovered "a new bird-like dinosaur from the Jurassic period," which challenged "widely accepted theories on the origin of flight." He was quoted as saying that the discovery "sheds further doubt on the theory that the famous fossil Archaeopteryx – or 'first bird' as it is sometimes referred to – is pivotal in the evolution of modern birds."

In a 2013 article for Nature, Dyke and five colleagues reported that while the "[d]iscovery of feathered theropod dinosaurs in China during the past two decades have prompted dramatic revisions of our ideas of the evolution of birds and the origins of flight — including the suggestion that the iconic fossil Archaeopteryx might have lain some distance from the ancestry of modern birds," a new fossil discovery "restores Archaeopteryx as an early diverging avialan."

Dyke was part of a British/Romanian/Brazilian team that discovered "a new kind of pterosaur, a flying reptile from the time of the dinosaurs," as reported in February 2013. Dyke was quoted as saying that experts have long disagreed about "the lifestyle and behavior of azhdarchids", and that the discovery supported the contention "that azhdarchids walked through forests, plains, and other places in search of small animal prey."

In 2013, Dyke and seven colleagues reported "the first evidence for a nesting colony of Mesozoic birds on Gondwana."

In 2013, Dyke and three colleagues described "a new taxon of medium-sized...azhdarchid pterosaur from the Upper Cretaceous Transylvanian Basin (Sebeş Formation) of Romania." It was "the most complete European azhdarchid yet reported."

In a 2013 article, Dyke and two colleagues argued that bone measurements "cannot be used to distinguish flight modes in extant birds, and so cannot be used to infer flight mode in fossil forms," and that "more data from fossil birds...is required if we are to be able to predict the flight modes of extinct birds."

=== Latest research ===
As of September 2013, Dyke's current research subjects were the anatomy and evolution of Lower Eocene birds, the Cretaceous paleoenvironments of Transylvania, the evolution of wings in dinosaurs and birds, Pterosaur flight biomechanics, the diversity and disparity of Cretaceous birds, and the evolution and diversity of galliform birds. At the time he was working on books about fossils of the Carpathian Basin and about "Nopcsa, the Dinosaur Baron of Transylvania".

Below is a list of taxa that Dyke has contributed to naming:

Year	Taxon	Authors
2014	Jeholornis curvipes sp. nov.	Lefèvre, Hu, Escuillié, Dyke, & Godefroit
2013	Aurornis xui gen. et sp. nov.	Godefroit, Cau, Dong-Yu, Escuillié, Wenhao, & Dyke
2013	Eosinopteryx brevipenna gen. et sp. nov.	Godefroit, Demuynck, Dyke, Hu, Escuillié, & Claeys
2013	Vectidraco daisymorrisae gen. et sp. nov.	Naish, Simpson, & Dyke
2012	Zhalmouzia bazhanovi gen. et sp. nov.	Averianov, Archibald, & Dyke
2011	Klallamornis buchanani sp. nov.	Dyke, Wang, & Habib
2011	Samrukia nessovi gen. et sp. nov.	Naish, Dyke, Cau, Escuillié, & Godefroit
2010	Morsoravis sedilis gen. et sp. nov.	Bertelli, Lindow, Dyke, & Chiappe
2008	Mopsitta tanta gen. et sp. nov.	Waterhouse, Lindow, Zelenkov, & Dyke
2007	Elsornis keni gen. et sp. nov.	Chiappe, Suzuki, Dyke, Watabe, Tsogtbaatar, & Barsbold
2002	Teviornis gobiensis gen. et sp. nov.	Kurochkin, Dyke, & Karhu
2001	Eocolius walkeri gen. et sp. nov.	Dyke & Waterhouse
2001	Laputavis robusta gen. et sp. nov.	Dyke

== Other professional activities ==
Dyke is on the Editorial Board of PLOS ONE, is Editor-in-Chief of Historical Biology, and is on the Reviewing editorial board of Cell Reports.

== Publications ==
=== Articles ===
- Godefroit, P.; Cau, A.; Dong-Yu, H.; Escuillie, F.; Wenhao, W.; Dyke, G.J. (2013). "A Jurassic avialan dinosaur from China resolves the early phylogenetic history of birds". Nature. 498 (7454): 359–362. Bibcode:2013Natur.498..359G. doi:10.1038/nature12168. PMID 23719374. S2CID 4364892.
- Belvedere, M.; Nour-Eddine, J.; Breda, A.; Gattolin, G.; Bourget, H.; Khaldoune, F.; Dyke, G. (2013). "Vertebrate footprints from the Kem Kem beds (Morocco): a novel ichnological approach to faunal reconstruction". Palaeogeography, Palaeoclimatology, Palaeoecology. 383–384: 52–58. Bibcode:2013PPP...383...52B. doi:10.1016/j.palaeo.2013.04.026.
- Fernández, M; Simoncini, M; Dyke, Gareth (2013). "Irregularly calcified eggs and eggshells of Caiman latirostris (Alligatoridae: Crocodylia)". Naturwissenschaften. 100 (5): 451–457. Bibcode:2013NW....100..451F. doi:10.1007/s00114-013-1044-3. hdl:11336/80112. PMID 23604383. S2CID 13920874.
- Fernández, Mariela; Garcia, Rudolfo; Fiorelli, Lucas; Scolaro, Alejandra; Salvador, Rodrigo; Cotaro, Carlos; Kaiser, Gary; Dyke, Gareth (2013). "A large accumulation of avian eggs from the Late Cretaceous of Patagonia (Argentina) reveals a novel nesting strategy in Mesozoic birds". PLOS ONE. 8 (4): 4. Bibcode:2013PLoSO...861030F. doi:10.1371/journal.pone.0061030. PMC 3629076. PMID 23613776.
- Naish, Darren; Simpson, Martin; Dyke, Gareth (2013). "A new small-bodied azhdarchoid pterosaur from the Lower Cretaceous of England and its implications for pterosaur anatomy, diversity and phylogeny". PLOS ONE. 8 (3): 3. Bibcode:2013PLoSO...858451N. doi:10.1371/journal.pone.0058451. PMC 3601094. PMID 23526986.
- Chan, N.E.; Dyke, Gareth; Benton, M.J. (2013). "Primary feather lengths may not be important for inferring the flight styles of Mesozoic birds". Lethaia. 46 (2): 146–153. Bibcode:2013Letha..46..146C. doi:10.1111/j.1502-3931.2012.00325.x.
- Godefroit, P.; Demuynck, H.; Dyke, G.J.; Hu, D.; Escuillié, F.; Claeys, P. (2013). "Reduced plumage and flight ability of a new Jurassic paravian theropod from China". Nature Communications. 4 1394. Bibcode:2013NatCo...4.1394G. doi:10.1038/ncomms2389. PMID 23340434.
- Nudds, Robert; Atterholt, Jessie; Wang, Xia; You, Hailu; Dyke, Gareth J (2013). "Locomotory abilities and habitat of the Cretaceous bird Gansus yumenensis inferred from limb length proportions". Journal of Evolutionary Biology. 26 (1): 150–154. doi:10.1111/jeb.12036. PMID 23194019. S2CID 26068874.
- Vremir, M; Kellner, A; Naish, D; Dyke, G.J. (2013). "A new azhdarchid pterosaur from the Late Cretaceous of the Transylvanian Basin, Romania: Implications for azhdarchid diversity and distribution". PLOS ONE. 8 (1): 1. Bibcode:2013PLoSO...854268V. doi:10.1371/journal.pone.0054268. PMC 3559652. PMID 23382886.
- Dyke, Gareth J.; Vremir, Matyas; Kaiser, Gary; Naish, Darren (2012). "A drowned Mesozoic bird breeding colony from the Late Cretaceous of Transylvania". Naturwissenschaften. 99 (6): 435–442. Bibcode:2012NW.....99..435D. CiteSeerX 10.1.1.394.9006. doi:10.1007/s00114-012-0917-1. PMID 22575918. S2CID 1396792.
- Palmer, Colin and Dyke, Gareth (2012) Constraints on the wing morphology of pterosaurs. Proceedings of the Royal Society of London B, 279, (1731), 1218-1224.
- Naish, Darren; Dyke, Gareth; Cau, Andrea; Escuillié, Francois; Godefroit, Pascal (2012). "A gigantic bird from the Upper Cretaceous of Central Asia". Biology Letters. 8 (1): 97–100. Bibcode:2012BiLet...8...97N. doi:10.1098/rsbl.2011.0683. PMC 3259976. PMID 21835881.
- Wang, X.; Nudds, R.L.; Palmer, C.; Dyke, G.J. (2012). "Size scaling and stiffness of avian primary feathers: implications for the flight of Mesozoic birds". Journal of Evolutionary Biology. 25 (3): 547–555. doi:10.1111/j.1420-9101.2011.02449.x. PMID 22260434. S2CID 205433769.
- Wang, Xia; Dyke, Gareth J.; Codrea, Vlad; Godefroit, Pascal; Smith, Thierry (2011). "A euenantiornithine bird from the Late Cretaceous Haţeg Basin of Romania". Acta Palaeontologica Polonica. 56 (4): 853–857. Bibcode:2011AcPaP..56..853W. doi:10.4202/app.2010.0085.
- Dyke, Gareth; Wang, Xia; Kaiser, Gary (2011). "Large fossil birds from a Late Cretaceous marine turbidite sequence on Hornby Island (British Columbia)". Canadian Journal of Earth Sciences. 48 (11): 1489–1496. Bibcode:2011CaJES..48.1489D. doi:10.1139/e11-050.
- Wang, Xia; Nudds, Robert; Dyke, Gareth (2011). "The feather lengths of early birds with respect to avian wing shape evolution". Journal of Evolutionary Biology. 24 (6): 1226–1331. doi:10.1111/j.1420-9101.2011.02253.x. PMID 21418115.

=== Books ===
- Fozy, Istvan, Szente, Istvan and Dyke, Gareth J. (2013) Fossils of the Carpathian Region, Indiana University Press (In Press).
- Dyke, Gareth and Kaiser, Gary (eds.) (2011) Living dinosaurs: the evolutionary history of modern birds, Chichester, GB, Wiley, 440pp.
- Dyke's short book The Phylogenetic Position of Gallinuloides Eastman (Aves: Galliformes) from the Tertiary of North America was published by Magnolia Press in 2003.
