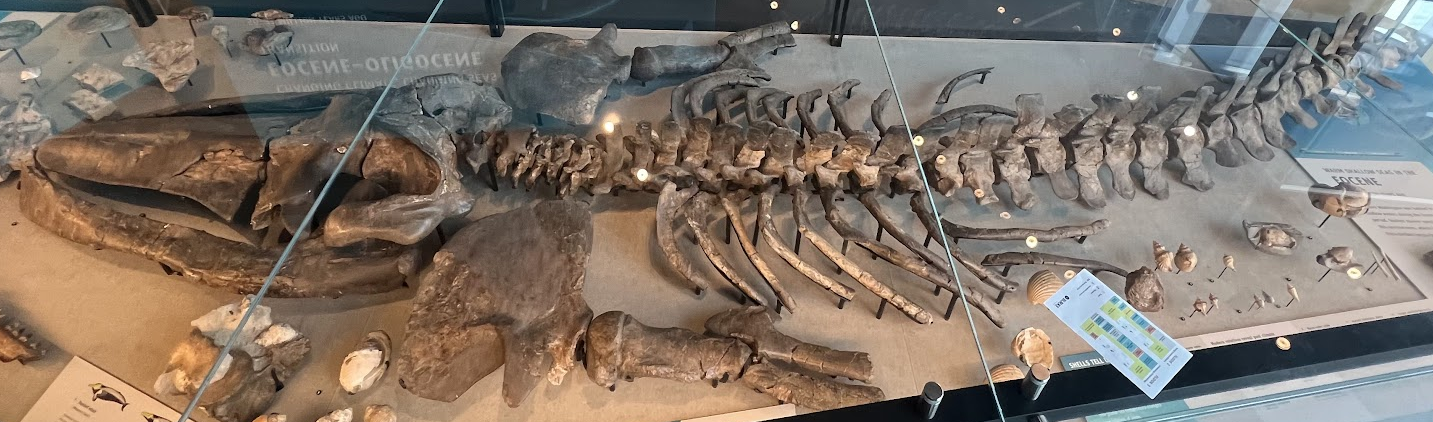
- Holotype skeleton (UWBM VP 82916) at the Burke Museum of Natural History and Culture

Scientific classification
- Kingdom: Animalia
- Phylum: Chordata
- Class: Mammalia
- Infraclass: Placentalia
- Order: Artiodactyla
- Infraorder: Cetacea
- Parvorder: Mysticeti
- Clade: Chaeomysticeti
- Genus: †Sitsqwayk; Peredo and Uhen, 2016

Type species
- Sitsqwayk cornishorum Peredo and Uhen, 2016

= Sitsqwayk =

Sitsqwayk Temporal range: Late Oligocene, 28–26 Ma

Extinct genus of whales

Sitsqwayk is a genus of baleen whale from Late Oligocene (Chattian) marine deposits in Washington state. The generic name refers to a powerful water spirit in the folklore of the Klallam that is said to bring wealth.

== Description ==
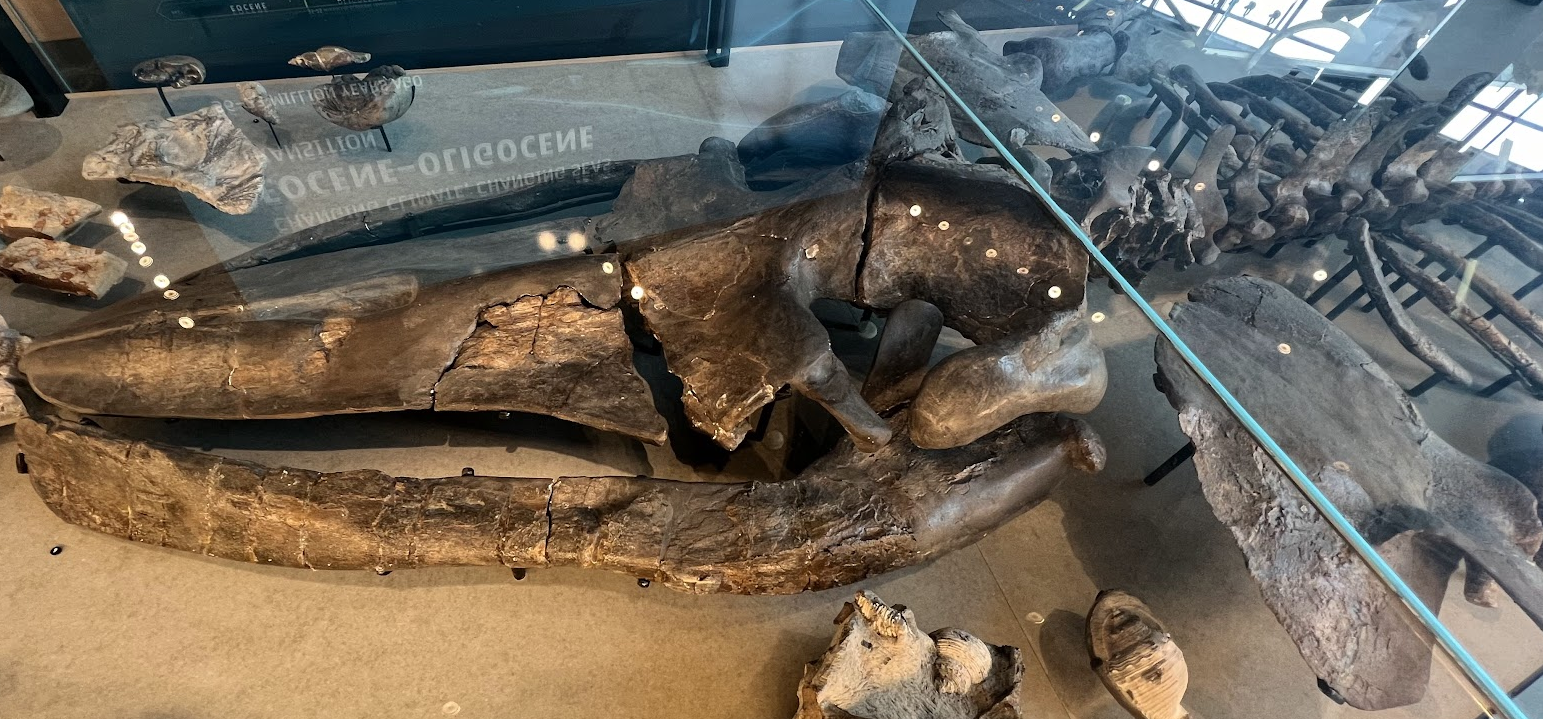
Closeup of skull

Sitsqwayk is distinguished from other early chaeomysticetes by the features of the rostrum and skull roof, especially in the premaxillae. It differs from members of Eomysticetidae in that the dorsal edge of the skull ascends steeply towards the palate, and that the longitudinal keel on the palate is sharp and narrow, constituting 75 percent of the rostrum.

== Phylogeny ==
Within Chaeomysticeti, Sitsqwayk is recovered as the most basal chaeomysticete, more primitive than eomysticetids and Horopeta.

== Paleobiology ==
Sitsqwayk is coeval with another Oligocene mysticete from the Pysht Formation, the aetiocetid Fucaia goedertorum.
