= Makah Formation =

Geologic formation in Washington state

- Stratigraphic range: Late Eocene to Early Oligocene
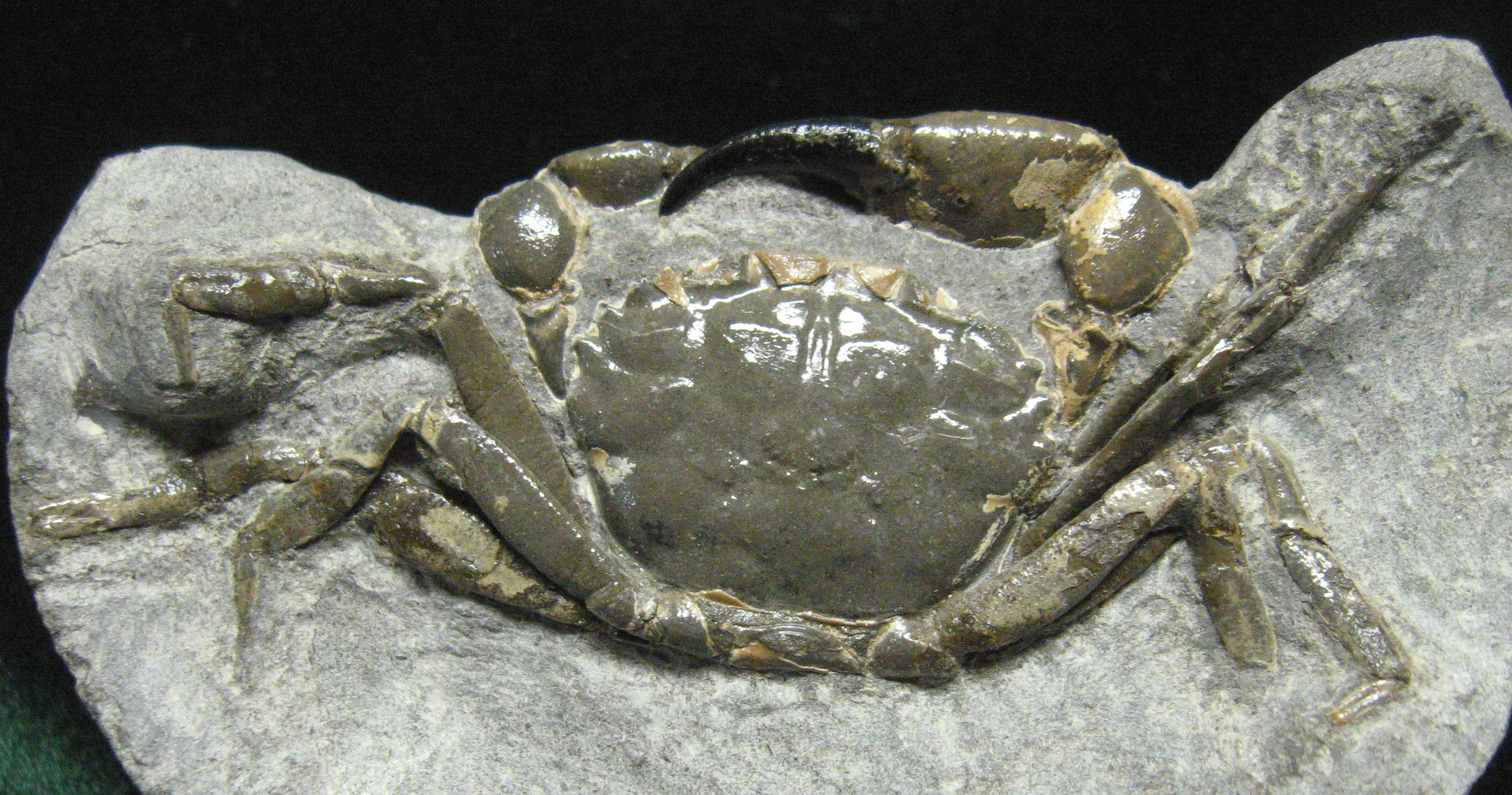
- Fossil of Branchioplax from the Makah Formation
- Type: Formation
- Unit of: Twin River Group
- Underlies: Pysht Formation
- Overlies: Hoko River Formation

Lithology
- Primary: Sandstone, siltstone

Location
- Region: Washington (state)
- Country: United States

Type section
- Named for: Makah Reservation
- Named by: Snavely et al, 1980

The Makah Formation is a geologic formation in Washington (state). It was deposited during the late Paleogene period between the late Eocene and early Oligocene epoches, and preserves marine fossils dating to the early Oligocene. It outcrops at the northwestern edge of the Olympic Peninsula. It appears to have been deposited in a deepwater environment, and the presence of glendonites suggests that water temperatures ranged near freezing at certain sites of deposition.

== Vertebrate paleobiota ==
The following fossil taxa are known:

=== Mammals ===
Mammals of the Makah Formation
Genus	Species	Presence	Material	Notes	Images
Fucaia	F. buelli			An aetiocetid baleen whale.	
Mysticeti indet.				A baleen whale of uncertain affinities.	

=== Birds ===
Birds of the Makah Formation
Genus	Species	Presence	Material	Notes	Images
Galliformes indet.			Skull	A landfowl of uncertain affinities.	
Klallamornis	K. buchanani			A plotopterid suliform.	
Klallamornis	K. clarki			A plotopterid suliform.	
Makahala	M. mirae			An early tubenose seabird. Type locality of genus and species.	
?Phalacrocoracoidea indet.				An indeterminate relative of cormorants and darters.	
Tonsala	T. hildegardae			A plotopterid suliform.	

=== Ray-finned fish ===
Ray-finned fish of the Makah Formation
Genus	Species	Presence	Material	Notes	Images
Coryphaenoides	C. richi		Scales, bones, and otolith	A grenadier. Type locality of species.	

== See also ==
- List of fossiliferous stratigraphic units in Washington (state)
- Paleontology in Washington (state)
