= List of prehistoric mammals of Japan =

This list is of prehistoric mammals known from the fossil record of the Japanese archipelago. For extant mammals from the area, see List of mammals of Japan (which includes the recently extinct species on the IUCN Red List and its domestic counterpart the Ministry of the Environment Red List). Other species that have gone extinct in historic times and extant species that have been locally extirpated and no longer form part of the fauna of Japan but are known from the fossil or subfossil record are additionally listed at the bottom of this page.

== Mesozoic ==
Clade	Order	Family	Genus	Species	Horizon	Age
Trechnotheria	†"Symmetrodonta"	†Spalacotheriidae	†Symmetrolestes	†S. parvus Tsubamoto & Rougier, 2004	Kitadani Formation	Early Cretaceous
Theriimorpha	†Eutriconodonta	†Amphidontidae	†Hakusanodon	†H. archaeus Rougier et al., 2007	Kuwajima Formation	Early Cretaceous
†Allotheria	†Multituberculata	†Eobaataridae	†Hakusanobaatar	†H. matsuoi Kusuhashi, 2008	Kuwajima Formation	Early Cretaceous
†Allotheria	†Multituberculata	†Eobaataridae	†Tedoribaatar	†T. reini Kusuhashi, 2008	Kuwajima Formation	Early Cretaceous
Eutheria	†Asioryctitheria		†Sasayamamylos	†S. kawaii Kusuhashi & Saegusa, 2013	Sasayama Group	Early Cretaceous
Eutheria		†Zhelestidae	†Sorlestes	†S. mifunensis Setoguchi et al., 1999	Mifune Group	Late Cretaceous

== Cenozoic ==
Order	Clade	Family	Genus	Species	Synonyms	Image	Age
†Cimolesta	†Pantodonta	†Coryphodontidae		†Coryphodontidae sp.			Early–Middle Eocene
†Cimolesta	†Pantodonta	†Coryphodontidae	†Asiocoryphodon	†Asiocoryphodon sp.			Early–Middle Eocene
†Cimolesta	†Tillodontia	†Esthonychidae	†Trogosus	†Trogosus cf. T. latidens			Early–Middle Eocene
†Cimolesta	†Tillodontia	†Esthonychidae	†Higotherium	†H. hypsodon Miyata & Tomida, 1998			Middle Eocene
Proboscidea	†Gomphotherioidea	†Gomphotheriidae	†Gomphotherium	†G. annectens	Hemimastodon annectens Matsumoto, 1924		Early Miocene
Proboscidea	†Gomphotherioidea	†Gomphotheriidae	†Gomphotherium	†G. annectens	Bunolophodon yokotii Makiyama, 1938		Early Miocene
Proboscidea	†Gomphotherioidea	†Gomphotheriidae	†Sinomastodon	†S. sendaicus	Trilophodon sendaicus Matsumoto, 1924		Early Pliocene
Proboscidea	Elephantoidea	†Stegodontidae	†Stegolophodon	†S. pseudolatidens	Eostegodon pseudolatidens Yabe, 1950		Miocene
Proboscidea	Elephantoidea	†Stegodontidae	†Stegolophodon	†S. pseudolatidens	Stegolophodon tsudai Shikama & Kirii, 1956		Miocene
Proboscidea	Elephantoidea	†Stegodontidae	†Stegolophodon	†S. pseudolatidens	Stegolophodon miyokoae Hatai, 1959		Miocene
Proboscidea	Elephantoidea	†Stegodontidae	†Stegodon	†S. miensis	Stegodon clifti miensis Matsumoto, 1941		Pliocene
Proboscidea	Elephantoidea	†Stegodontidae	†Stegodon	†S. miensis	Stegolophodon shinshuensis Fossil Elephant Research Group, 1979		Pliocene
Proboscidea	Elephantoidea	†Stegodontidae	†Stegodon	†S. miensis	Stegodon bombifrons Itsukaichi Stegodon Research Group, 1980		Pliocene
Proboscidea	Elephantoidea	†Stegodontidae	†Stegodon	†S. miensis	Stegodon cf. elephantoides		Pliocene
Proboscidea	Elephantoidea	†Stegodontidae	†Stegodon	†S. protoaurorae Aiba, Baba & Matsukawa, 2010			Late Pliocene–Early Pleistocene
Proboscidea	Elephantoidea	†Stegodontidae	†Stegodon	†S. aurorae	Elephas aurorae Matsumoto, 1918		Early Pleistocene
Proboscidea	Elephantoidea	†Stegodontidae	†Stegodon	†S. aurorae	Parastegodon? kwantoensis Tokunaga, 1934		Early Pleistocene
Proboscidea	Elephantoidea	†Stegodontidae	†Stegodon	†S. aurorae	Parastegodon sugiyamai Tokunaga, 1935		Early Pleistocene
Proboscidea	Elephantoidea	†Stegodontidae	†Stegodon	†S. aurorae	Parastegodon akashiensis Takai, 1936		Early Pleistocene
Proboscidea	Elephantoidea	†Stegodontidae	†Stegodon	†S. aurorae	Parastegodon infrequens Shikama, 1937		Early Pleistocene
Proboscidea	Elephantoidea	†Stegodontidae	†Stegodon	†S. aurorae	Stegodon shodoensis (partim)		Early Pleistocene
Proboscidea	Elephantoidea	†Stegodontidae	†Stegodon	†S. orientalis	Stegodon orientalis shodoensis Matsumoto, 1924		Middle Pleistocene
Proboscidea	Elephantoidea	Elephantidae	†Palaeoloxodon	†P. naumanni	Elephas namadicus naumanni Makiyama, 1924		Middle–Late Pleistocene
Proboscidea	Elephantoidea	Elephantidae	†Palaeoloxodon	†P. naumanni	Loxodonta (Palaeoloxodon) tokunagai Matsumoto, 1924		Middle–Late Pleistocene
Proboscidea	Elephantoidea	Elephantidae	†Palaeoloxodon	†P. naumanni	Elephas indicus buski Matsumoto, 1927		Middle–Late Pleistocene
Proboscidea	Elephantoidea	Elephantidae	†Palaeoloxodon	†P. naumanni	Loxodonta (Palaeoloxodon) namadica yabei Matsumoto, 1929		Middle–Late Pleistocene
Proboscidea	Elephantoidea	Elephantidae	†Palaeoloxodon	†P. naumanni	Palaeoloxodon yokohamanus Tokunaga, 1934		Middle–Late Pleistocene
Proboscidea	Elephantoidea	Elephantidae	†Palaeoloxodon	†P. naumanni	Palaeoloxodon aomoriensis Tokunaga & Takai, 1936		Middle–Late Pleistocene
Proboscidea	Elephantoidea	Elephantidae	†Palaeoloxodon	†P. naumanni	Elephas (Palaeoloxodon) namadicus setoensis Makiyama, 1929		Middle–Late Pleistocene
Proboscidea	Elephantoidea	Elephantidae	†Mammuthus	†M. trogontherii	Euelephas protomammonteus Matsumoto, 1924		Early Pleistocene
Proboscidea	Elephantoidea	Elephantidae	†Mammuthus	†M. trogontherii	Parelephas protomammonteus proximus Matsumoto, 1926		Early Pleistocene
Proboscidea	Elephantoidea	Elephantidae	†Mammuthus	†M. trogontherii	Parelephas protomammonteus typicus Matsumoto, 1926		Early Pleistocene
Proboscidea	Elephantoidea	Elephantidae	†Mammuthus	†M. trogontherii	Elephas primigenius matsumotoi Dietrich, 1927		Early Pleistocene
Proboscidea	Elephantoidea	Elephantidae	†Mammuthus	†M. trogontherii	Parelephas proximus uehataensis Shikama, 1937		Early Pleistocene
Proboscidea	Elephantoidea	Elephantidae	†Mammuthus	†M. trogontherii	Archidiskodon paramammonteus shigensis Matsumoto & Ozaki, 1959		Early Pleistocene
Proboscidea	Elephantoidea	Elephantidae	†Mammuthus	†M. primigenius			Late Pleistocene
Sirenia		Dugongidae	†Dusisiren	†D. dewana Takahashi, Domning & Saito, 1986			Late Miocene
Sirenia		Dugongidae	†Dusisiren	†D. takasatensis Kobayashi, Horikawa & Miyazaki, 1995			Late Miocene
Sirenia		Dugongidae	†Hydrodamalis	†H. spissa Furusawa, 1988			Late Pliocene
Lagomorpha		Ochotonidae	†Alloptox	†A. japonicus Tomida, 2012			Early Miocene
Rodentia	Hystricomorpha			Ctenodactyloidea sp.			Early–Middle Eocene
Rodentia	Hystricomorpha	Diatomyidae	†Diatomys	†D. shantungensis			Early Miocene
Rodentia	Castorimorpha	Castoridae	†Steneofiber	†Steneofiber sp.			Late Oligocene
Rodentia	Castorimorpha	Castoridae	†Youngofiber	†Y. sinensis	Trogontherium sinensis Young, 1955		Early Miocene
Rodentia	Castorimorpha	Castoridae	†Minocastor	†M. godai Mörs, Tomida & Kalthoff, 2016			Early Miocene
Rodentia	Castorimorpha	Castoridae	†Euroxenomys	†E. nanus Mörs & Tomida, 2018			Early Miocene
Rodentia	†Eomyoidea	†Eomyidae	†Megapeomys	†M. repenningi Tomida, 2011			Early Miocene
Rodentia	†Eomyoidea	†Eomyidae	†Japaneomys	†J. yasunoi Kimura et al., 2019			Early Miocene
Rodentia	Myomorpha	Cricetidae	Microtus	†M. epiratticepoides Kawamura, 1988			Middle–Late Pleistocene
Rodentia	Myomorpha	Cricetidae	Clethrionomys	†C. japonicus Kawamura, 1988			Middle Pleistocene
Rodentia	Myomorpha	Cricetidae	Cricetulus	Cricetulus sp.			Middle Pleistocene
Rodentia	Myomorpha	Muridae	Niviventer	Niviventer sp.			Late Pleistocene-Holocene
Rodentia	Myomorpha	Muridae	Rattus	†R. miyakoensis Kawaguchi, Kaneko & Hasegawa, 2009			Late Pleistocene
Primates	Haplorhini	Cercopithecidae	†Kanagawapithecus	†K. leptopostorbitalis	Dolichopithecus (Kanagawapithecus) leptopostorbitalis Iwamoto, Hasegawa & Koizumi, 2005		Pliocene
Primates	Strepsirrhini	†Sivaladapidae		†Sivaladapidae sp.			Early–Middle Eocene
Eulipotyphla		†Plesiosoricidae	†Plesiosorex	†P. fejfari Oshima, Tomida & Orihara, 2017			Early Miocene
Eulipotyphla		Soricidae	†Shikamainosorex	†S. densicingulata Hasegawa, 1957			Middle Pleistocene
Eulipotyphla		Soricidae	Anourosorex	†A. japonicus Shikama & Hasegawa, 1958			Late Pleistocene
Chiroptera	Yangochiroptera	Vespertilionidae	†Pleistomyotis	†P. longihumeralis			Middle Pleistocene
Chiroptera	Yangochiroptera	Vespertilionidae	Myotis	†M. okafujii			Middle Pleistocene
Chiroptera	Yangochiroptera	Vespertilionidae	Myotis	†M. beppuensis			Middle Pleistocene
†Desmostylia			†Behemotops	†B. katsuiei Inuzuka, 2000			Late Oligocene
†Desmostylia		†Desmostylidae	†Ashoroa	†A. laticosta Inuzuka, 2000			Late Oligocene
†Desmostylia		†Desmostylidae	†Desmostylus	†D. japonicus Tokunaga & Iwasaki, 1914			Miocene
†Desmostylia		†Paleoparadoxiidae	†Paleoparadoxia	†P. tabatai	Cornwallius tabatai Tokunaga, 1939		Miocene
†Desmostylia		†Paleoparadoxiidae	†Paleoparadoxia	†P. media Inuzuka, 2005			Miocene
Artiodactyla	Suina	Suidae		Suidae indet.	Palaeochoerus japonicus Takai, 1954		Early Miocene
Artiodactyla	Suina	Suidae	†Hyotherium	†H. shanwangense			Middle Miocene
Artiodactyla	Cetancodontamorpha	†Entelodontidae	†Entelodon	†E. gobiensis			Late Eocene
Artiodactyla	Cetancodontamorpha			†Dichobunoidea sp.			Middle–Late Eocene
Artiodactyla	Cetancodontamorpha	†Anthracotheriidae	†Bothriogenys	†Bothriogenys sp.			Late Eocene
Artiodactyla	Cetancodontamorpha	†Anthracotheriidae	†Bothriodon	†B. sandaensis Tsubamoto et al., 2007			Middle–Late Eocene
Artiodactyla	Cetancodontamorpha	†Anthracotheriidae	†Elomeryx	†E. japonicus	Brachyodus japonicus Matsumoto, 1925		Middle Oligocene
Artiodactyla	Cetacea		†Sinanodelphis	†S. izumidaensis Makiyama, 1936			Miocene
Artiodactyla	Cetacea	Delphinidae	†Eodelphinus	†E. kabatensis	Stenella kabatensis Horikawa, 1977		Miocene
Artiodactyla	Cetacea	Delphinidae	†Norisdelphis	†N. annakaensis Kimura & Hasegawa, 2020			Miocene
Artiodactyla	Cetacea	Delphinidae	Pseudorca	†P. yokoyamai Matsumoto, 1926			Pliocene
Artiodactyla	Cetacea	Delphinidae	Orcinus	†O. paleorca	Orca paleorca Matsumoto, 1937		Early Pleistocene
Artiodactyla	Cetacea	†Kentriodontidae	†Kentriodon	†K. sugawarai Guo & Kohno, 2021			Early–Middle Miocene
Artiodactyla	Cetacea	†Kentriodontidae	†Kentriodon	†K. hobetsu Ichishima, 1994			Middle Miocene
Artiodactyla	Cetacea	Monodontidae	†Haborodelphis	†H. japonicus Ichishima et al., 2018			Early Pliocene
Artiodactyla	Cetacea	Phocoenidae	†Miophocaena	†M. nishinoi Murakami et al., 2012			Late Miocene
Artiodactyla	Cetacea	Phocoenidae	†Archaeophocaena	†A. teshioensis Murakami et al., 2012			Late Miocene
Artiodactyla	Cetacea	Phocoenidae	†Pterophocaena	†P. nishinoi Murakami et al., 2012			Late Miocene
Artiodactyla	Cetacea	Phocoenidae	†Haborophocoena	†H. toyoshimai Ichishima & Kimura, 2005			Early Pliocene
Artiodactyla	Cetacea	Phocoenidae	†Haborophocoena	†H. minutus Ichishima & Kimura, 2009			Early Pliocene
Artiodactyla	Cetacea	Phocoenidae	†Numataphocoena	†N. yamashitai Ichishima & Kimura, 2000			Early Pliocene
Artiodactyla	Cetacea	Ziphiidae	Berardius	†B. kobayashii Kawatani & Kohno, 2021			Middle–Late Miocene
Artiodactyla	Cetacea	†Allodelphinidae	†Ninjadelphis	†N. ujiharai Kimura & Barnes, 2016			Early Miocene
Artiodactyla	Cetacea		†Awadelphis	†A. hirayamai Murakami, 2016			Late Miocene
Artiodactyla	Cetacea		†Miophyseter	†M. chitaensis Kimura & Hasegawa, 2022			Early Miocene
Artiodactyla	Cetacea		†Brygmophyseter	†B. shigensis	Scaldicetus shigensis Hirota & Barnes, 1994		Middle Miocene
Artiodactyla	Cetacea	†Eomysticetidae	†Yamatocetus	†Y. canaliculatus Okazaki, 2012			Late Oligocene
Artiodactyla	Cetacea	Balaenidae	†Idiocetus	†I. tsugarensis Matsumoto, 1926			Late Miocene
Artiodactyla	Cetacea	Balaenidae	†Archaeobalaena	†A. dosanko Tanaka, Furusawa & Kimura, 2020			Early Pliocene
Artiodactyla	Cetacea		†Taikicetus	†T. inouei Tanaka, Ando & Sawamura, 2018			Middle Miocene
Artiodactyla	Cetacea		†Isanacetus	†I. laticephalus Kimura & Ozawa, 2002			Early Miocene
Artiodactyla	Cetacea		†Diorocetus	†D. chichibuensis Yoshida, Kimura & Hasegawa, 2003			Miocene
Artiodactyla	Cetacea		†Diorocetus	†D. shobarensis Otsuka & Ota, 2008			Middle Miocene
Artiodactyla	Cetacea		†Parietobalaena	†P. yamaokai Otsuka & Ota, 2008			Middle Miocene
Artiodactyla	Cetacea	Cetotheriidae	†Hibacetus	†H. hirosei Otsuka & Ota, 2008			Middle Miocene
Artiodactyla	Cetacea	Cetotheriidae	†Joumocetus	†J. shimizui Kimura & Hasegawa, 2010			Late Miocene
Artiodactyla	Cetacea	Balaenopteridae	Eschrichtius	†E. akishimaensis Kimura, Hasegawa & Kohno, 2018			Early Pleistocene
Artiodactyla	Ruminantia			Cervoidea indet.	Amphitragulus minoensis Matsumoto, 1918		Early Miocene
Artiodactyla	Ruminantia	Cervidae	†Dicrocerus	†D. tokunagai Matsumoto, 1927			Early Miocene
Artiodactyla	Ruminantia	Cervidae	†Cervavus	†C. oweni hirabayashii Tokunaga, 1926			Late Miocene
Artiodactyla	Ruminantia	Cervidae	†Metaplatyceros	†M. sequoiae Shikama, 1941			Late Pliocene
Artiodactyla	Ruminantia	Cervidae	Axis	†A. japonicus	Cervus (Axis) japonicus Otsuka, 1967		Early Pleistocene
Artiodactyla	Ruminantia	Cervidae	Axis	†A. japonicus	Axis kyushuensis		Early Pleistocene
Artiodactyla	Ruminantia	Cervidae	Elaphurus	†E. akashiensis	Cervus akasiensis Shikama, 1941		Late Pliocene
Artiodactyla	Ruminantia	Cervidae	Elaphurus	†E. bifurcatus shikamai	Elaphurus shikamai Otsuka, 1968		Early Pleistocene
Artiodactyla	Ruminantia	Cervidae	Elaphurus	†E. davidianus tamaensis	Elaphurus (Elaphurus) tamaensis Shikama & Hasegawa, 1976		Early Pleistocene
Artiodactyla	Ruminantia	Cervidae	Elaphurus	†E. davidianus menziesianus	Capreolus (Capreolina) mayai Tokunaga & Takai, 1936		Middle–Late Pleistocene
Artiodactyla	Ruminantia	Cervidae	Elaphurus	†E. davidianus menziesianus	Elaphurus mayai		Middle–Late Pleistocene
Artiodactyla	Ruminantia	Cervidae	Cervus	†C. (Nipponicervus) kazusensis	Cervus (Sika) kazusensis Matsumoto, 1926		Pleistocene
Artiodactyla	Ruminantia	Cervidae	Cervus	†C. (Nipponicervus) kazusensis	Cervus (Deperetia) trassaerti Shikama, 1941		Pleistocene
Artiodactyla	Ruminantia	Cervidae	Cervus	†C. (Nipponicervus) kazusensis	Cervus (Deperetia) urbanus Shikama, 1941		Pleistocene
Artiodactyla	Ruminantia	Cervidae	Cervus	†C. (Nipponicervus) kazusensis	Cervus (Anoglochis) praenipponicus Shikama, 1936		Pleistocene
Artiodactyla	Ruminantia	Cervidae	Cervus	†C. (Nipponicervus) kazusensis	Cervus (Deperetia) naorai Shikama, 1936		Pleistocene
Artiodactyla	Ruminantia	Cervidae	Cervus	†C. (Nipponicervus) kazusensis	Cervus (Nipponicervus?) takaoi Otsuka & Shikama, 1977		Pleistocene
Artiodactyla	Ruminantia	Cervidae	Cervus	†C. (Nipponicervus) kazusensis	Cervus (Deperetia) shimabarensis Otsuka, 1967		Pleistocene
Artiodactyla	Ruminantia	Cervidae	Cervus	†C. astylodon	Muntiacus astylodon Matsumoto, 1926		Pleistocene
Artiodactyla	Ruminantia	Cervidae	Cervus	†C. astylodon	Cervus (Rucervus) riukiuensis Matsumoto, 1926		Pleistocene
Artiodactyla	Ruminantia	Cervidae	Cervus	†C. greyi katokiyomasai	Cervus (Rucervus) katokiyomasai Shikama & Hasegawa, 1965		Pleistocene
Artiodactyla	Ruminantia	Cervidae	Cervus	†C. greyi katokiyomasai	Cervus (Sika) natsumei Matsumoto, 1938		Pleistocene
Artiodactyla	Ruminantia	Cervidae	Cervus	†C. greyi katokiyomasai	Cervus (Sika) paleoezoensis Otsuka & Shikama, 1977		Pleistocene
Artiodactyla	Ruminantia	Cervidae	Cervus	†C. kyushuensis	Cervus (Rusa) kyushuensis Otsuka, 1966		Early Pleistocene
Artiodactyla	Ruminantia	Cervidae	Cervus	†C. akiyoshiensis	Cervus (Nipponicervus) akiyoshiensis Otsuka, 1977		Late Pleistocene
Artiodactyla	Ruminantia	Cervidae	†Sinomegaceros	†S. yabei	Cervus (Sinomegaceros) yabei Shikama, 1938		Pleistocene
Artiodactyla	Ruminantia	Cervidae	†Sinomegaceros	†S. yabei	Megaceros kinryuensis Matsumoto & Mori, 1956		Pleistocene
Artiodactyla	Ruminantia	Cervidae	†Sinomegaceros	†S. yabei	Megaceros (Sinomegaceros) ordosianus minor Kamei, 1958		Pleistocene
Artiodactyla	Ruminantia	Cervidae	†Sinomegaceros	†S. yabei	Giraffa (Orasius?) nipponica Matsumoto, 1926		Pleistocene
Artiodactyla	Ruminantia	Cervidae	Capreolus	†C. tokunagai Otuka, 1941	Capreolus miyakoensis Hasegawa, Otsuka & Nohara, 1973		Pleistocene–Holocene
Artiodactyla	Ruminantia	Bovidae	Bubalus	Bubalus sp.			Middle Pleistocene
Artiodactyla	Ruminantia	Bovidae	Bison	†B. hanaizumiensis	Leptobison hanaizumiensis Matsumoto & Mori, 1956		Late Pleistocene
Artiodactyla	Ruminantia	Bovidae	Bison	†B. priscus			Late Pleistocene
Artiodactyla	Ruminantia	Bovidae	Capricornis	†C. (?) nikitini	Naemorhedus nikitini Shikama, 1949		Pleistocene
Perissodactyla		†Hyopsodontidae	†Hyopsodus	†Hyopsodus sp.			Early–Middle Eocene
Perissodactyla	Hippomorpha	†Brontotheriidae		†Brontotheriidae sp.			Early–Middle Eocene
Perissodactyla	Hippomorpha	Equidae	†Anchitherium	†Anchitherium aff. A. gobiense	Anchitherium hypohippoides Matsumoto, 1921		Early Miocene
Perissodactyla	†Ancylopoda	†Isectolophidae	†Isectolophus	†Isectolophus sp.			Early–Middle Eocene
Perissodactyla	†Ancylopoda	†Chalicotheriidae		†Schizotheriinae sp.			Early Miocene
Perissodactyla	Tapiroidea	†Helaletidae	†Plesiocolopirus	†P. grangeri	Desmatotherium grangeri Tokunaga, 1933		Middle Eocene
Perissodactyla	Tapiroidea	†Helaletidae	†Plesiocolopirus	†P. kushiroensis	Colodon kushiroensis Tomida, 1983		Middle Eocene–Early Oligocene
Perissodactyla	Tapiroidea	Tapiridae	†Plesiotapirus	†P. yagii	Palaeotapirus yagii Matsumoto, 1921		Early Miocene
Perissodactyla	Rhinocerotoidea	†Hyrachyidae	†Hyrachyus	cf. †Hyrachyus sp.			Early–Middle Eocene
Perissodactyla	Rhinocerotoidea	†Amynodontidae	†Zaisanamynodon	†Zaisanamynodon cf. Z. protheroi			Middle–Late Eocene
Perissodactyla	Rhinocerotoidea	†Amynodontidae	†Zaisanamynodon	cf. †Z. borisovi			Late Eocene
Perissodactyla	Rhinocerotoidea	†Amynodontidae	†Amynodon	†A. watanabei	†Amynodon (?) watanabei Tokunaga, 1926		Middle–Late Eocene
Perissodactyla	Rhinocerotoidea	Rhinocerotidae	†Brachypotherium	†B. pugnator	Teleoceras (Brachypotherium) pugnator Matsumoto, 1921		Early Miocene
Perissodactyla	Rhinocerotoidea	Rhinocerotidae	†Brachypotherium	†B. pugnator	Chilotherium pugnator		Early Miocene
Perissodactyla	Rhinocerotoidea	Rhinocerotidae	†Brachypotherium	†B. pugnator	Teleoceras (?) kaniensis Tokunaga, 1926		Early Miocene
Perissodactyla	Rhinocerotoidea	Rhinocerotidae	†Brachypotherium	†B. pugnator	Teleoceras (?) tokiensis Tokunaga, 1926		Early Miocene
Perissodactyla	Rhinocerotoidea	Rhinocerotidae	†Plesiaceratherium	†Plesiaceratherium sp.			Early Miocene
Perissodactyla	Rhinocerotoidea	Rhinocerotidae	†Stephanorhinus	†S. kirchbergensis	Dicerorhinus nipponicus [ja] Shikama, 1967		Middle Pleistocene
Perissodactyla	Rhinocerotoidea	Rhinocerotidae	†Stephanorhinus	†S. kirchbergensis	Rhinoceros shindoi Tokunaga, 1931		Middle Pleistocene
Carnivora		†Miacidae		†Miacidae sp.			Early–Middle Eocene
Carnivora	Feliformia	Felidae	Panthera	†P. youngi	Felis youngi		Middle Pleistocene
Carnivora	Feliformia	Felidae	Felis	†F. microtus			Pleistocene
Carnivora	†Amphicyonoidea	†Amphicyonidae	†Ysengrinia	†Ysengrinia sp.			Middle Miocene
Carnivora	Canoidea	Canidae	Canis	†C. falconeri			Early Pleistocene
Carnivora	Canoidea	Canidae	Cuon	Cuon sp.			Middle Pleistocene
Carnivora	Canoidea	Canidae	Nyctereutes	†N. viverrinus nipponicus Shikama, 1949			Pleistocene
Carnivora	Musteloidea	Ailuridae	†Parailurus	†Parailurus sp.			Early–Middle Pliocene
Carnivora	Musteloidea	Mustelidae	Meles	†M. mukasianakuma Shikama, 1949			Middle Pleistocene
Carnivora	Musteloidea	Mustelidae	Meles	†M. leucurus kuzuuensis Shikama, 1949			Middle Pleistocene
Carnivora	Musteloidea	Mustelidae	Martes	†M. ten Shikama, 1949			Pleistocene
Carnivora	Musteloidea	Mustelidae	†Enhydrictis	†E. (Oriensictis) nipponica	Lutra nipponica Naora, 1968		Middle Pleistocene
Carnivora	Musteloidea	Mustelidae	†Enhydrictis	†E. (Oriensictis) nipponica	Oriensictis nipponica		Middle Pleistocene
Carnivora	Musteloidea	Mustelidae	Mustela	†M. constricta			Middle Pleistocene
Carnivora	Musteloidea	Mustelidae	Mustela	†M. kuzuuensis	Putorius kuzuuensis Shikama, 1949		Late Pleistocene
Carnivora	Pinnipedia	†Desmatophocidae	†Allodesmus	†A. uraiporensis Tonomori et al., 2018			Middle Miocene
Carnivora	Pinnipedia	†Desmatophocidae	†Allodesmus	†A. naorai Kohno, 1996			Middle Miocene
Carnivora	Pinnipedia	†Desmatophocidae	†Allodesmus	†A. sinanoensis	Eumetopias sinanoensis Nagao, 1941		Middle Miocene
Carnivora	Pinnipedia	†Desmatophocidae	†Allodesmus	†A. sinanoensis	Megagomphos sinanoensis		Middle Miocene
Carnivora	Pinnipedia	†Desmatophocidae	†Allodesmus	†A. sinanoensis	Allodesmus megallos Hirota, 1995		Middle Miocene
Carnivora	Pinnipedia	†Desmatophocidae	†Allodesmus	†A. sinanoensis	Allodesmus sadoensis Hirota, 1995		Middle Miocene
Carnivora	Pinnipedia	†Desmatophocidae	†Allodesmus	†Allodesmus sp.			Middle Miocene
Carnivora	Pinnipedia	Otariidae	†Thalassoleon	†T. inouei Kohno, 1992			Pliocene
Carnivora	Pinnipedia	Otariidae	†Oriensarctos	†O. watasei	Eumetopias watasei Matsumoto, 1925		Early Pleistocene
Carnivora	Pinnipedia	Otariidae	Callorhinus	†C. gilmorei			Pliocene
Carnivora	Pinnipedia	Otariidae		Otariidae sp.	Eumetopias ojiyaensis Horikawa, 1981		Late Pleistocene
Carnivora	Pinnipedia	Odobenidae	†Prototaria	†P. planicephala Kohno, 1994			Middle Miocene
Carnivora	Pinnipedia	Odobenidae	†Prototaria	†P. primigena Takeyama & Ozawa, 1984			Middle Miocene
Carnivora	Pinnipedia	Odobenidae	†Pseudotaria	†P. muramotoi Kohno, 2006			Miocene
Carnivora	Pinnipedia	Odobenidae	†Archaeodobenus	†A. akamatsui Tanaka & Kohno, 2015			Late Miocene
Carnivora	Pinnipedia	Odobenidae	†Protodobenus	†P. japonicus Horikawa, 1995			Early Pliocene
Carnivora	Pinnipedia	Odobenidae	Odobenus	†O. mandanoensis Tomida, 1989			Middle Pleistocene

== Historical extinctions and local extirpations ==
Order	Clade	Family	Genus	Species	Synonyms	Image	Age
Sirenia		Dugongidae	†Hydrodamalis	†H. gigas			Early–Middle Pleistocene
Rodentia	Myomorpha	Cricetidae	Microtus	M. oeconomus			Late Pleistocene
Rodentia	Myomorpha	Cricetidae	Microtus	M. fortis			Late Pleistocene
Rodentia	Myomorpha	Cricetidae	Myopus	M. schisticolor			Middle Pleistocene
Artiodactyla	Ruminantia	Cervidae	Rusa	R. unicolor			Pliocene
Artiodactyla	Ruminantia	Cervidae	Alces	A. alces			Late Pleistocene
Artiodactyla	Ruminantia	Moschidae	Moschus	M. moschiferus			Pleistocene
Artiodactyla	Ruminantia	Bovidae	Bos	†B. primigenius			Late Pleistocene
Carnivora	Feliformia	Felidae	Panthera	P. pardus			Pleistocene
Carnivora	Feliformia	Felidae	Panthera	P. tigris			Pleistocene
Carnivora	Feliformia	Felidae	Lynx	L. lynx			Late Pleistocene-Holocene

== Fossil species synonymized with extant or recently extinct species ==
Order	Clade	Family	Genus	Species	Synonyms	Image	Age
Artiodactyla	Suinae	Suidae	Sus	S. scrofa	Sus nipponicus Matsumoto, 1915		Middle–Late Pleistocene
Artiodactyla	Suinae	Suidae	Sus	S. scrofa	Sus cf. lydekkeri		Middle–Late Pleistocene
Perissodactyla	Hippomorpha	Equidae	Equus	E. caballus	Equus nipponicus Shikama & Onuki, 1962		Late Pleistocene–Holocene
Carnivora	Arctoidea	Ursidae	Ursus	U. arctos	Ursus tanakai Shikama, 1949		Pleistocene
Carnivora	Pinnipedia	Otariidae	Zalophus	Z. californianus	Eumetopias (?) kishidai Shikama, 1953		Pleistocene
Carnivora	Pinnipedia	Otariidae	Zalophus	†Z. japonicus	Zalophus kimitsensis Matsumoto, 1939		Early Pleistocene

== See also ==
- List of prehistoric birds of Japan
- Land bridges of Japan
