= List of prehistoric birds of Japan =

This list is of prehistoric birds and avialan dinosaurs known from the fossil record of the Japanese archipelago. For extant birds from the area, see List of birds of Japan.

== Mesozoic ==
Clade	Clade	Family	Genus	Species	Synonyms	Image	Age				
Clade	Clade	Family	Genus	Species	Synonyms	Image	Age	Avialae	†Fukuipteryx	†F. prima Imai et al., 2019	Early Cretaceous
Hesperornithes		†Chupkaornis	†C. keraorum Tanaka et al., 2017			Late Cretaceous		Avialae			

=== Ootaxa ===
- Plagioolithus fukuiensis

== Cenozoic ==
Clade	Order	Family	Genus	Species	Synonyms	Image	Age						
Clade	Order	Family	Genus	Species	Synonyms	Image	Age	Neognathae	Anseriformes	Anatidae	†Annakacygna	†A. hajimei Matsuoka & Hasegawa, 2022	Miocene
†A. yoshiiensis Matsuoka & Hasegawa, 2022								Neognathae	Anseriformes	Anatidae	†Annakacygna		Miocene
†Shiriyanetta	†S. hasegawai Watanabe & Matsuoka, 2015			Pleistocene				Neognathae	Anseriformes	Anatidae			
Charadriiformes	Alcidae	Uria	†U. onoi Watanabe, Matsuoka & Matsuoka, 2016			Middle Pleistocene		Neognathae					
Procellariiformes	Diomedeidae	Diomedea	†D. tanakai Davis, 2003			Early Miocene		Neognathae					
Suliformes	†Plotopteridae	†Copepteryx	†C. hexeris Olson & Hasegawa, 1996			Oligocene		Neognathae					
Suliformes	†Plotopteridae	†Copepteryx	†C. titan Olson & Hasegawa, 1996			Oligocene		Neognathae					
Suliformes	†Plotopteridae	†Hokkaidornis	†H. abashiriensis Sakurai, Kimura & Katoh, 2008			Late Oligocene		Neognathae					
Suliformes	†Plotopteridae	†Stenornis	†S. kanmonensis Ohashi & Hasegawa, 2020			Oligocene		Neognathae					
Suliformes	†Plotopteridae	†Empeirodytes	†E. okazakii Ohashi & Hasegawa, 2020			Oligocene		Neognathae					

== See also ==
- List of prehistoric mammals of Japan
- Spectacled cormorant
