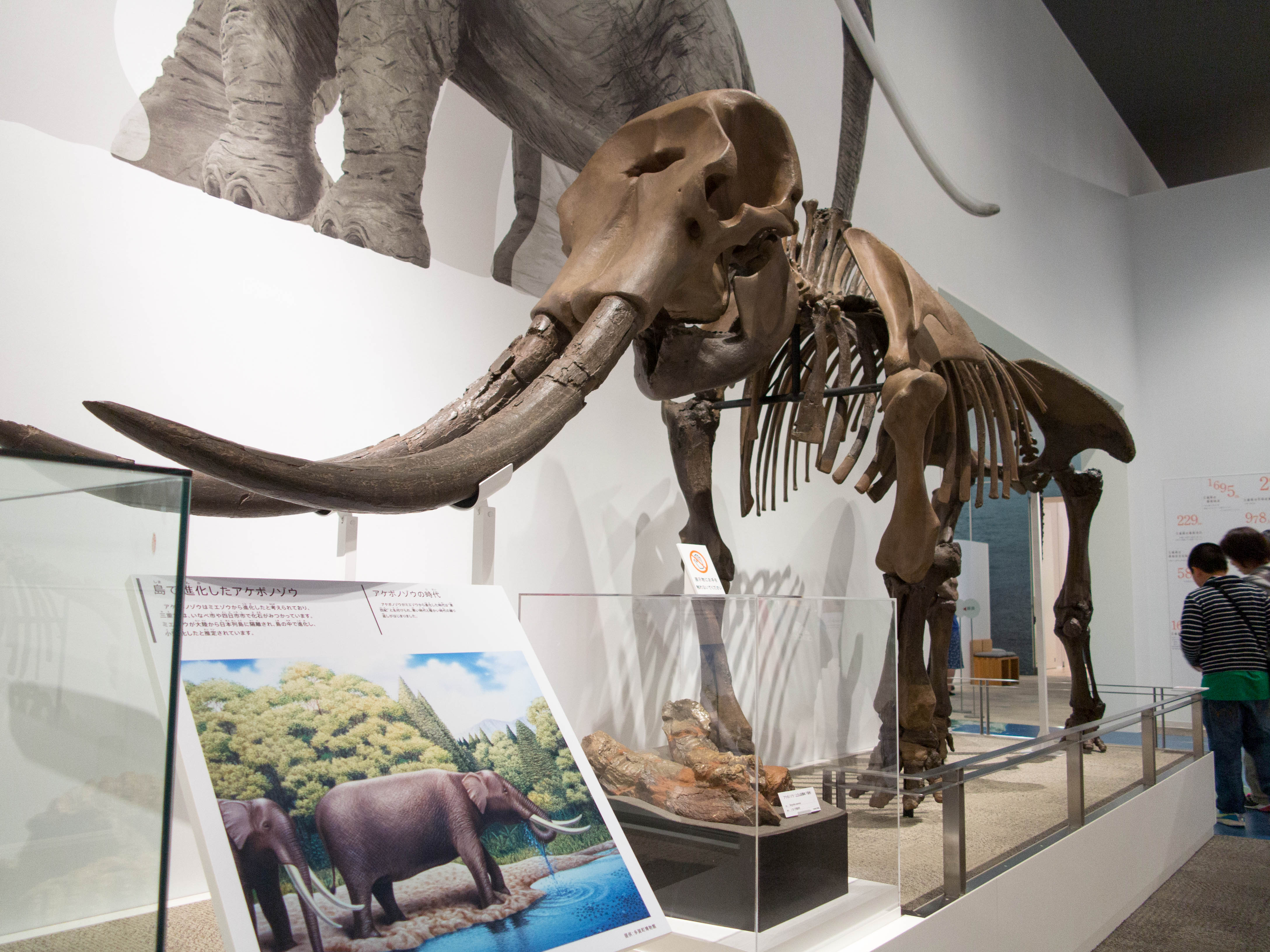
- Replica of the well-preserved Akebono elephant skeleton from Taga, Shiga Prefecture (Mie Prefectural Museum)

Scientific classification
- Kingdom: Animalia
- Phylum: Chordata
- Class: Mammalia
- Order: Proboscidea
- Family: †Stegodontidae
- Genus: †Stegodon
- Species: †S. aurorae

Binomial name
- †Stegodon aurorae (Matsumoto, 1918)

Synonyms
- Elephas aurorae (protonym); Parastegodon aurorae; Parastegodon akashiensis; Parastegodon infrequens; Parastegodon? kwantoensis; Parastegodon sugiyamai; Stegodon (Parastegodon) aurorae; Stegodon akashiensis; Stegodon infrequens; Stegodon kwantoensis; Stegodon sugiyamai; Stegodon shodoensis (partim)

= Stegodon aurorae =

Stegodon aurorae Temporal range: Plio-Pleistocene

Species of fossil elephantoid

Stegodon aurorae is an extinct species of Stegodon known from Early Pleistocene (2.0 Ma – 1.0 Ma) of Japan and possibly Taiwan. It appears to be an insular dwarf species, exhibiting smaller body size than its mainland ancestors.

== Description ==
The best-preserved Stegodon aurorae skeleton, that from Taga in Shiga Prefecture, stands to a shoulder height of 1.93 m (6 ft 4 in), with a body length of 4.58 m (15.0 ft). It is relatively short-legged, the ratio between vertebral column length and shoulder height being 0.88. The body mass of S. aurorae has been calculated at one quarter (around 2,122 kilograms (4,678 lb)) of that of its mainland ancestor S. zdanskyi, which had a shoulder height of around 3.6 m (12 ft); as such, it is an example of insular dwarfism.

== Distribution ==
Remains of Stegodon aurorae have been found in over forty-five localities in the Japanese archipelago, mainly in central Honshū. The type specimen was from Ishikawa Prefecture, while among the eight skeletons, one was found in Saitama Prefecture, two in Nagano Prefecture, one in Shiga Prefecture, one in Mie Prefecture, and three in Hyōgo Prefecture. A fragmentary lower jaw with part of a third molar attributed has also been recovered from "Cho-chen", Taiwan.However, other authors have argued that Stegodon remains from Taiwan should be included in S. orientalis instead.

== Biozone ==
The species lends its name to the biostratigraphic assemblage zone referred to as the "S. aurorae Zone". This biozone, from two to one million years ago, includes deer (Elaphurus spp., Cervus sp.) and rhino (Rhinoceros sp.) as species that competed for resources, as well as the predatory canine Canis falconeri.

== Evolution ==
Cladistic analysis of cranial characters suggests a close relationship between Stegodon aurorae and Stegodon zdanskyi from northern China. S. zdanskyi is thought to have reached Japan over a land bridge in the Early Pliocene, around 5-4 million years ago giving rise there to the smaller S. miensis (c. 4–2.9 Ma) the earliest of the four stegodontids found in the Japanese archipelago, due to isolation from the mainland. S. miensis was then succeed by S. protoaurorae (c. 2.9–2 Ma), and then S. aurorae (2-1 Ma) The progressive size reduction from S. miensis to S. aurorae is suggested to have been driven marine transgression reducing the land area of the Japanese archipelago. The absence of S. aurorae from the fossil record of China and the Korean Peninsula supports the theory of the species arising within the archipelago.

Following the extinction of Stegodon aurorae around 1 million years ago, it was succeeded in Japan by Stegodon orientalis, which is also known from mainland East Asia, which arrived in the archipelago as a result of a separate migration during the Middle Pleistocene.

== Taxonomy ==
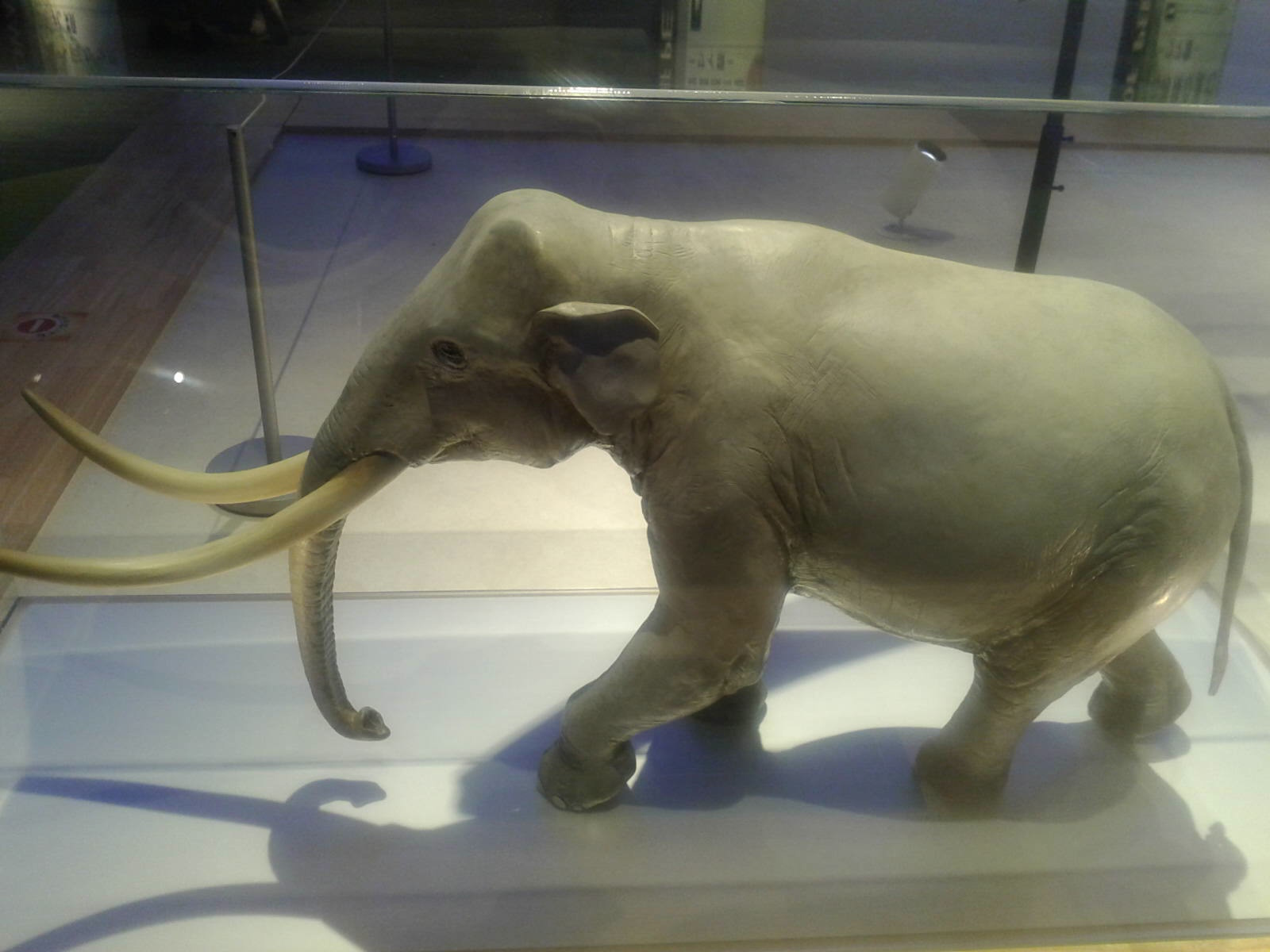
Model of Stegodon aurorae

Elephas aurorae was described by Matsumoto Hikoshichirō in 1918, based on an upper molar from Mount Tomuro in the old Province of Kaga (present-day Ishikawa Prefecture). In 1924, Matsumoto erected the genus Parastegodon and transferred to it the Akebono elephant, the new combination being Parastegodon aurorae. In 1938, Makiyama Jirō synonymized Parastegodon with Stegodon. In a 1991 review of the former genus Parastegodon, Taruno Hiroyuki confirmed the synonymization of Stegodon kwantoensis (Tokunaga, 1934), Stegodon sugiyamai (Tokunaga, 1935), Stegodon akashiensis (Takai, 1936), and Stegodon infrequens (Shikama, 1937), as well as some of the material referred to Stegodon shodoensis Matsumoto, 1924, with Stegodon aurorae.

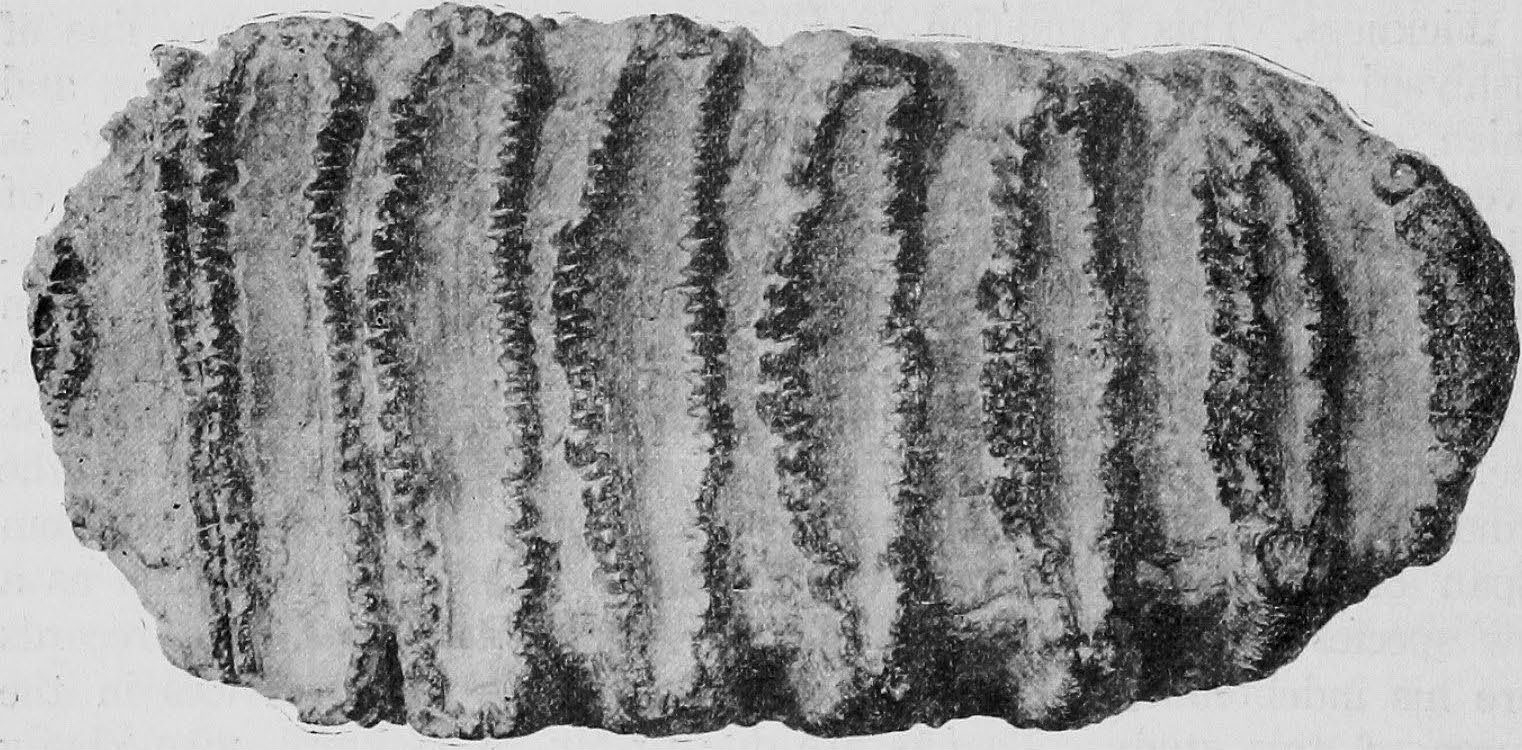
Parastegodon akashiensis, a synonym of Stegodon aurorae, was described by Matsumoto from a cheek tooth from former Akashi District.

Stegodon orientalis shodoensis was described by Matsumoto in 1924, from material from the village of Yoshima [ja] (now Sakaide), Kagawa Prefecture. The subspecies was elevated to species rank by Makiyama in 1938. Some of the material referred to S. shodoensis (ショウドゾウ also ミツゴゾウ) belongs to S. aurorae. Parastegodon? kwantoensis, the protonym of Stegodon kwantoensis (カントウゾウ), was described by Tokunaga Shigeyasu in 1934 from dental material excavated in the village of Kakio [ja] (now Kawasaki), Kanagawa Prefecture. Parastegodon sugiyamai, the protonym of Stegodon sugiyamai (スギヤマゾウ), was described by Tokunaga Shigeyasu in 1935, from a molar unearthed during the building of a road in the village of "Saida", Kagawa Prefecture. Parastegodon akashiensis, the protonym of Stegodon akashiensis (アカシゾウ), was described by Takai Fuyuji in 1936, from an upper molar (a cheek tooth) from the cliffs along the shore of the village of Ōkubo (now Akashi), Hyōgo Prefecture. Additional material from the coast of and sea bed off Akashi, including two skulls and a lower jaw, was published at the same time and referred to P. akashiensis by Shikama Tokio. Parastegodon infrequens, the protonym of Stegodon infrequens (インフリークエンスゾウ also タキガワゾウ), was described by Shikama Tokio in 1937, from material from the seabed off Akashi, Hyōgo Prefecture. P. kwantoensis, P. sugiyamai, and some of the material referred to P. akashiensis were synonymized with P. aurorae, and P. infrequens with P. akashiensis, by Takai in 1938. Taruno synonymized P. akashiensis with S. aurorae in 1991.

== See also ==
- List of prehistoric mammals of Japan
- National Museum of Nature and Science
