= Empeirodytes =

Empeirodytes Temporal range: Oligocene ~33–22 Ma

Scientific classification
- Kingdom: Animalia
- Phylum: Chordata
- Class: Aves
- Order: Suliformes
- Family: †Plotopteridae
- Genus: †Empeirodytes; Ohashi & Hasegawa, 2020

Type species
- Empeirodytes okazakii Ohashi & Hasegawa, 2020

Extinct genus of Plotopteridae

Empeirodytes is an extinct genus of Plotopteridae, a family of large flightless bird known from the Late Eocene to the Early Miocene of the West Coast of the United States, British Columbia and Japan. Remains associated with Empeirodytes have been found in Oligocene rocks of the Ashiya Group, on the islands of Ainoshima and Kaijima, near Kitakyushu, Japan.

== History and Etymology ==
In 2020, Ohashi Tomoyuki and Hasegawa Yoshikazu first described the remains of Empeirodytes okazakii, assigning as holotype KMNH VP 600011, a partial left coracoid found in Oligocene-aged rocks of the Ashiya Group on the island of Ainoshima, Japan. They referred as paratype a right coracoid from the same horizon, discovered on the nearby Kaijima.

=== Etymology ===
The genus name, Empeirodytes, is formed from the Greek prefix "Empeiros", meaning "proficient", and the suffix "-dytes", meaning "diver", referencing the adaptation towards wing-propelled diving exhibited by plotopterids.

The species name, "okazakii", honours Okazaki Yoshihiro, another vertebrate researcher who worked on fossils from the Ashiya Group.

== Description ==
The genus Empeirodytes is only known from two isolated coracoids. It is assumed from the size of those remains that the bird was a medium-sized plotopterid, smaller than the large genera of Japanese tonsalin plotopterids Copepteryx and Hokkaidornis, but larger than the derived Plotopterum. Empeirodytes is mostly differentiated from other genera of plotopterids by the presence of a high and sharp ridge on the caudal margin of the labrum internum, and of a clear depression on the ventral surface of the portion where the shaft of the coracoid articulates with the humerus. The presence of that depression may indicate the attachment of the supracoracoideus muscle, used by plotopterids to propel themselves through water, potentially indicating that Empeirodytes and its relative Stenornis had better swimming abilities than most other plotopterids.

== Palaeobiology ==
During the Oligocene, the sea that composes today the Yamaga Formation and the Jinnobaru Formation of the Ashiya Group was home to at least four species of plotopterids, the medium-sized Empeirodytes, the large-sized Stenornis kanmonensis and Copepteryx hexeris, and the giant Copepteryx titan. Alongside these, those waters were also populated by the eomysticetid whale Yamatocetus, sharks and pelagornithid seabirds.
