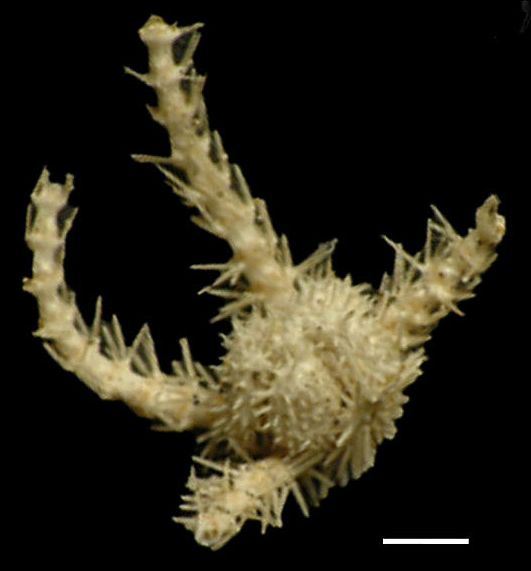
- Ophiotholia montana

Scientific classification
- Kingdom: Animalia
- Phylum: Echinodermata
- Class: Ophiuroidea
- Order: Ophioscolecida
- Family: Ophiohelidae
- Genus: Ophiotholia; Lyman, 1880

Type species
- Ophiotholia supplicans Lyman, 1883

Species
- 8, see text

= Ophiotholia =

Ophiotholia Temporal range: 174–0 Ma Middle Jurassic to Present

Genus of brittle stars

Ophiotholia is a deep-sea genus of brittle stars in the family Ophiohelidae. Fossils from this genus have been found dating to the Middle Jurassic.
