= Stenornis =

Stenornis Temporal range: Oligocene ~33–22 Ma

Scientific classification
- Kingdom: Animalia
- Phylum: Chordata
- Class: Aves
- Order: Suliformes
- Family: †Plotopteridae
- Genus: †Stenornis; Ohashi & Hasegawa, 2020

Type species
- Stenornis kanmonensis Ohashi & Hasegawa, 2020

Extinct genus of Plotopteridae

Stenornis is an extinct genus of Plotopteridae, a family of large-sized, flightless seabirds native from the North Pacific during the Paleogene and the earliest Neogene. The remains of Stenornis have been found in Oligocene rocks of the Jinnobaru Formation on Hikoshima and the Ashiya Group on Ainoshima, Japan.

== History and Etymology ==
The first remain associated with Stenornis, an isolated left coracoid, was collected in 1976 by Ota Masamichi on the Japanese island of Hikoshima, and described in 1979 as an indeterminate new species of plotopterid by Ota and Hasegawa Yoshikazu. In 1986, while describing the new genus Copepteryx, Hasegawa and Storrs L. Olson tentatively referred that coracoid to the North American genus Tonsala, of which the coracoid was then badly known, based on similarities found in then undescribed Japanese plotopterids. In 2020, a new analysis of the coracoid (KMNH VP 200003) from Hikoshima by Ohashi Tomoyuki and Hasegawa Yoshikazu led to the removal of the specimen from Tonsala and the creation of the new genus and species Stenornis kanmonensis, using the Hikoshima coracoid as holotype and another coracoid, found on Ainoshima by Sato Masahiro, as paratype.

=== Etymology ===
The genus name, Stenornis, is formed from the Ancient Greek prefix "steno-", meaning "strait", and the suffix "-ornis", meaning "bird". The species name, kanmonensis, refers to the Kanmon Strait, where the holotype of the genus was discovered.

== Description ==
Stenornis is only known from two isolated coracoid bones. Size estimates based on comparison of these bones with those of other plotopterids indicates that it was roughly the size of its contemporary relative Copepteryx hexeris. Given the paucity of its remains, Stenornis is mainly differentiated from its relatives by osteological details of its coracoid, including the presence of a sulcus elongated craniocaudally on the ventral surface of the shaft, a processus lateralis located toward the cranial portion of the shaft, and a face where the coracoid articulates with the clavicle broader than all other plotopterids and bean-shaped. Despite being similarly sized with its relative Copepteryx, found in the same deposits, the coracoid was slightly smaller, although much larger than that of Tonsala, more gracile, with a narrower sternal end and a broader and proximally situated lateral process.

The distinctive presence of a small depression on the middle of the face where the coracoid would articulate with the humerus. Although this depression was much less visible than for its relative Empeirodytes, it is speculated that the supracoracoideus muscle would have been attached to it. The supracoracoideus muscle was responsible for the efficiency of plotopterids at wing-propelled diving, and was enlarged compared to those of non-diving birds. The presence of this attachment depression on the coracoid might indicate that Stenornis and Empeirodytes were more powerful swimmers than most other plotopterids.

== Palaeoecology ==
During the Oligocene period, the prehistoric seas that are preserved today in the geological formations that compose the Ashiya Group were populated by at least four species of plotopterids : Empeirodytes okazakii, Stenornis kanmonensis, Copepteryx hexeris and Copepteryx titan. Fossil remains of sharks, pelagornithid seabirds, and early whales like the eomysticetid Yamatocetus have also been recovered in Oligocene sediments belonging to the group.
