= Yamaga =

Yamaga may refer to:

- Hiroyuki Yamaga (born 1962), Japanese anime director and producer
- Yamaga Sokō (1622–1685), Japanese philosopher and strategist
- Yamaga, Kumamoto
- Yamaga, Ōita
- Yamaga Formation
- Yamaga Station
