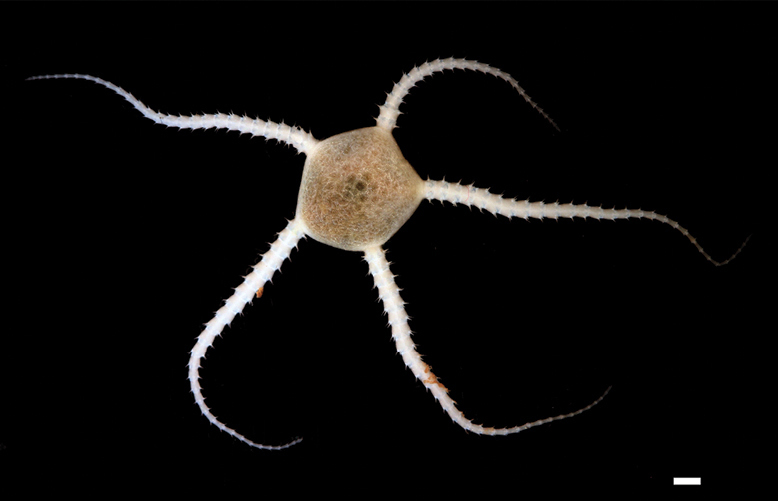
- Ophiocymbium tanyae

Scientific classification
- Kingdom: Animalia
- Phylum: Echinodermata
- Class: Ophiuroidea
- Order: Ophioscolecida
- Family: Ophioscolecidae; Matsumoto, 1915

Type genus
- Ophioscolex Müller & Troschel, 1842

Genera
- 16, see text

= Ophioscolecidae =

Ophioscolecidae Temporal range: 83.6–0 Ma Late Cretaceous to Present

Family of brittle stars

Ophioscolecidae is one of the three families of brittle stars in the order Ophioscolecida. The earliest fossils from this family (Ophioscolex sp.) date back to the Late Campanian in the Late Cretaceous.

== Taxonomy ==
The following 16 genera are included in the family.

- Lapidaster† Thuy, 2013
- Ophiocymbium Lyman, 1880
- Ophiogeron Lyman, 1878
- Ophiohyalus Matsumoto, 1915
- Ophiohymen H.L. Clark, 1911
- Ophioleptoplax H.L. Clark, 1911
- Ophiologimus H.L. Clark, 1911
- Ophiolycus Mortensen, 1933
- Ophiophrura H.L. Clark, 1911
- Ophioplexa Martynov, 2010
- Ophioprium H.L. Clark, 1915
- Ophiorupta Martynov, 2010
- Ophioscolex Müller & Troschel, 1842
- Ophiosyzygus H.L. Clark, 1911
- Ophiuroconis Matsumoto, 1915
- Soliophis Okanishi & Mah, 2020
