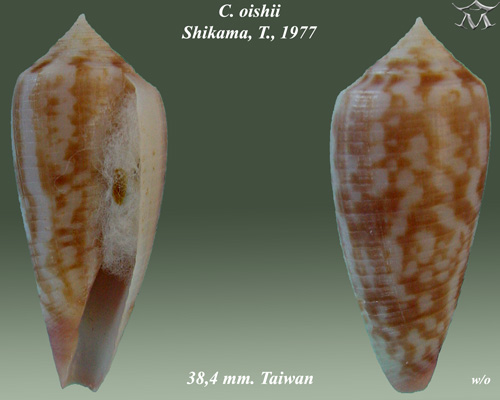
- Apertural and abapertural views of shell of Conus oishii Shikama, T., 1977
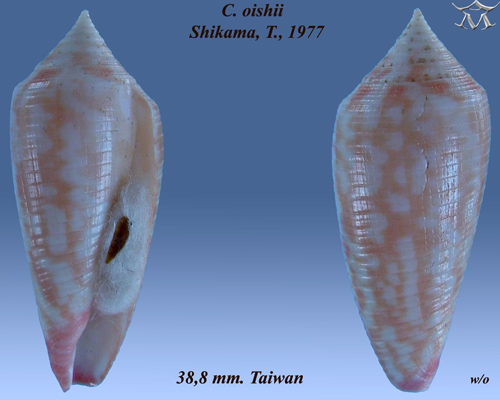

Scientific classification
- Kingdom: Animalia
- Phylum: Mollusca
- Class: Gastropoda
- Subclass: Caenogastropoda
- Order: Neogastropoda
- Superfamily: Conoidea
- Family: Conidae
- Genus: Conus
- Species: C. oishii

Binomial name
- Conus oishii (Shikama, 1977)

Synonyms
- Asprella oishii Shikama, 1977; Conus (Phasmoconus) oishii (Shikama, 1977)· accepted, alternate representation; Graphiconus oishii (Shikama, 1977)

= Conus oishii =

Species of sea snail

Conus oishii is a species of sea snail, a marine gastropod mollusk in the family Conidae, the cone snails and their allies.

Like all species within the genus Conus, these snails are predatory and venomous. They are capable of stinging humans, therefore live ones should be handled carefully or not at all.

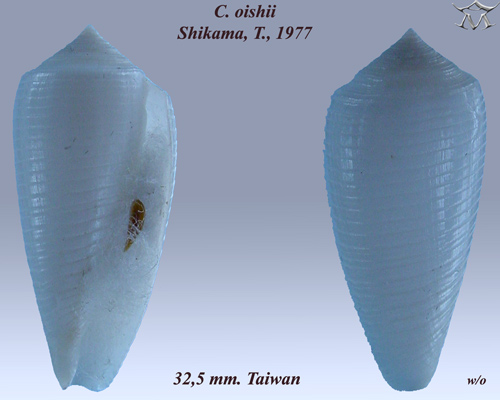
Conus oishii Shikama, T., 1977

== Description ==
The size of the shell varies between 20 mm and 44 mm.

== Distribution ==
This marine species occurs off Taiwan and Indonesia.
