= Calliostoma hayashii =

Scientific classification
- Kingdom: Animalia
- Phylum: Mollusca
- Class: Gastropoda
- Subclass: Vetigastropoda
- Order: Trochida
- Family: Calliostomatidae
- Subfamily: Calliostomatinae
- Genus: Calliostoma
- Species: C. hayashii

Binomial name
- Calliostoma hayashii Shikama, 1977

Species of gastropod

Calliostoma hayashii is a species of sea snail, a marine gastropod mollusk in the family Calliostomatidae.

== Notes ==
Additional information regarding this species:

- Taxonomic remark: Some authors place this taxon in the subgenus Calliostoma (Tristichotrochus).
