= Conus blatteus =

Scientific classification
- Kingdom: Animalia
- Phylum: Mollusca
- Class: Gastropoda
- Subclass: Caenogastropoda
- Order: Neogastropoda
- Superfamily: Conoidea
- Family: Conidae
- Genus: Conus
- Species: C. blatteus

Binomial name
- Conus blatteus Shikama, 1979

Synonyms
- Conus (Leporiconus) blatteus Shikama, 1979; Kioconus (Isoconus) blatteus (Shikama, 1979); Kioconus blatteus (Shikama, 1979)

Species of gastropod

Conus blatteus is a species of sea snail, a marine gastropod mollusk, in the family Conidae (a mostly predatory taxonomic family consisting of cone snails and their allies).

== Description ==
This rare species attains a size of 45 mm.

== Distribution ==
Philippines.
