= Chicoreus ryukyuensis =

Scientific classification
- Kingdom: Animalia
- Phylum: Mollusca
- Class: Gastropoda
- Subclass: Caenogastropoda
- Order: Neogastropoda
- Family: Muricidae
- Genus: Chicoreus
- Species: C. ryukyuensis

Binomial name
- Chicoreus ryukyuensis Shikama, 1978

Species of gastropod

Chicoreus ryukyuensis is a species of sea snail, a marine gastropod mollusk in the family Muricidae, the murex snails or rock snails.

== Description ==
The shell is around 40mm long and 20mm wide, pinkish white with orange tints. It has 7.5 volutes lined with short spines down to a siphonal canal.

== Distribution ==
The species was discovered near the Okinawa Islands, part of the Ryukyu island chain after which it was named.
