= Species of Amynodon =

Taxonomy of a fossil mammal genus

The amynodont genus Amynodon has had a complex taxonomic history. Since the genus was described by Othniel Charles Marsh in 1877, fourteen species have been named, based on fossils found in North America, Asia, and Europe. In 1982, William P. Wall restricted the use of Amynodon to only North American fossils, and recognized only two species as valid and actually belonging to the genus: the type species A. advenus, and A. reedi. In 2018, a phylogenetic analysis recovered A. reedi in a significantly more derived position than A. advenus, limiting Amynodon to only the type species.

Several species formerly assigned to Amynodon have been reassessed and referred to other genera. Although Amynodon is generally restricted to A. advenus, the genus name continues to be applied to several other species pending much-needed reexaminations of the fossil material.

== Valid species ==
=== Amynodon advenus ===
Amynodon advenus is the type and currently only valid species of Amynodon, originally described as "Diceratherium advenum" by Othniel Charles Marsh in 1875, based on fossils from the Uinta Basin (Uinta Formation) in Utah. Marsh initially believed the new species to represent a true rhinoceros, and diagnosed it based on a third upper premolar (YPM 11763). In 1877, Marsh moved the species to the new genus Amynodon, as Amynodon advenus, based on a nearly complete skull (YPM 11453), also from the Uinta Formation in Utah. Confusion exists over the type specimen; Marsh never designated a type, and used different fossils to diagnose "D. advenum" in 1875 (YPM 11763) and A. advenus in 1877 (YPM 11453). Fossil discoveries since the 1870s have made A. advenus the best represented amynodont in the fossil record.

== Species pending reassessment ==
=== North America ===
==== Amynodon reedi ====
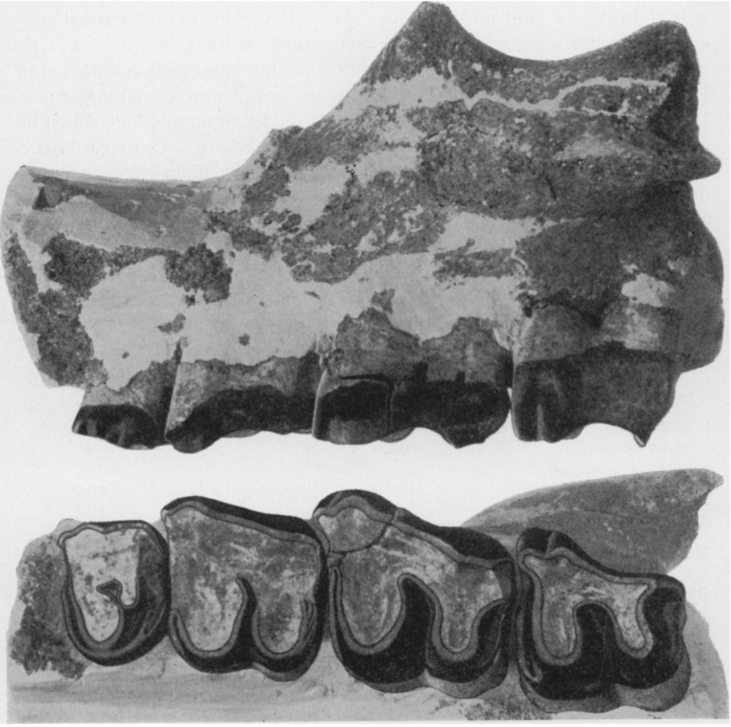
Type maxilla of A. reedi (LACM (CIT) 314/2529)

Amynodon reedi was described by Chester Stock in 1939, based on a fragmentary left maxilla, LACM (CIT) 314/2529, which Stock stated was found in the "Poway conglomerate" in San Diego, California. Modern stratigraphic revisions of the region place this in the Friars Formation. Of the dentition, the type maxilla preserves the fourth premolar to third molar. Stock compared the maxilla to a small Amynodon fossil found in the Uinta Formation, AMNH 1936A. Some later authors misread Stock's comparison and erroneously believed that A. reedi was also reported from the Uinta Formation. Stock distinguished A. reedi from the then multiple recognized species of North American Amynodon by its small size, and by its fourth premolar being narrow, with a metaloph at a right angle to the tooth's external border.

In a 1982 revision of Amynodon, William P. Wall recognized only A. advenus and A. reedi as valid species of Amynodon, and identified the other North Amerian species A. antiquus, A. erectus, and A. intermedius as junior synonyms of A. advenus. Wall recognized A. reedi as distinct due to its earlier age compared to A. advenus, and its apparently more primitive cheek teeth. Wall further noted that there were no fossils with morphology intermediate between A. advenus and A. reedi, which suggested that the differences between the two were not due to individual variation.

In 2018, Tissier et al. recovered A. reedi as only distantly related to A. advenus in a phylogenetic analysis. A. reedi was recovered in a much more derived position, as the sister taxon of Zaisanamynodon. Tissier et al. suggested that A. reedi is more similar to Zaisanamynodon than to A. advenus, for instance in the lack of a lingual cingulum on the upper molars, and that it differs from Zaisanamynodon only in size and one dental feature, that the hypocones on the third and fourth premolars are anterior to the metacone. Tissier et al. (2018) thus proposed that A. reedi was not a species of Amynodon and should be referred to as "Amynodon" reedi until its fossils are reexamined and assessed. The cladogram below presents amynodont relations as recovered by Tissier et al. (2018):

- Amynodontidae
  - Rostriamynodon grangeri
  - - Amynodon advenus
    - - Sharamynodon mongoliensis
      - - Metamynodontini
          ⊞
          - Paramynodon birmanicus
          - - Megalamynodon regalis
            - - Sellamynodon zimborensis
              - Metamynodon planifrons
          ⊟
        - Cadurcodontini
          - - Amynodon reedi
            - - Zaisanamynodon borisovi
              - Zaisanamynodon protheroi
          - - Sianodon gaowangouensis
            - - - - Amynodontopsis bodei
                  - Amynodontopsis aff. bodei
                - - Cadurcotherium minus
                  - Cadurcotherium cayluxi
              - - Cadurcodon bahoensis
                - - Cadurcodon maomingensis
                  - - Cadurcodon ardynensis
                    - Cadurcodon kazakademius

=== Asia ===
Several species of Amynodon have been named based on fossils found in East Asia. In his 1982 revision of Amynodon, Wall restricted the use of the genus to fossils from North America, recognizing only A. advenus and A. reedi as valid species belonging to Amynodon. As Amynodon is currently understood, none of the Asian species of Amynodon thus belong to the genus. Wall recommended that the Asian Amynodon material should be treated as Amynodontidae incertae sedis. The generic affiliation of these species remains uncertain, and detailed reexaminations of the fossils are still necessary.

==== Amynodon altidens ====
Type jaw of A. altidens (IVPP V.2654)

Amynodon altidens was described by Xu Yu-Xuan and Chiu Chang-siang in 1962, based on a fragmentary right mandible from Lunan, Yunnan (IVPP V.2654). The only teeth preserved in the mandible are the second and third molars. Xu and Chiu characterized A. altidens as intermediate in size between the larger A. mongoliensis (=Sharamynodon) and the smaller A. sinensis. They distinguished the species by its higher tooth crowns, lengthened third molar, and the distinct longitudinal grooves on the external surfaces of the molars, as well as more slanted transverse ridges.

==== Amynodon alxaensis ====
Type skull of A. alxaensis (IVPP V.4941)

Amynodon alxaensis was described by Qi Tao in 1975, based on a partial skull from Alxa Zuoqi, Ningxia (IVPP V.4941). Qi referred the skull to Amynodon based on its similar dental formula, and especially noted similarities to A. mongoliensis (=Sharamynodon). Although closest to Amynodon, Qi also noted morphological similarities to Cadurcodon ardynensis and Sianodon bahoensis, notably that the skull showed a shorter face and more constricted tooth row than in A. mongoliensis.

In 1997, Wang Banyue and Wang Peiyu suggested that A. alxaensis may represent a species of Sharamynodon, based on the similarities noted by Qi.

==== Amynodon lunanensis ====
Type upper and lower jaws of A. lunanensis (PMNH P2GM340)

Amynodon lunanensis was described by Zhou Mingzhen, Xu Yu-Xuan, and Zhen Shuo-nan in 1964, based on a partial skull and associated partial lower jaw from Hsiaogotze-Baiyaoshan, five kilometers north of Lunan, Yunnan (PMNH P2GM340). Zhou, Xu, and Zhen compared the fossils only to A. mongoliensis (=Sharamynodon) and A. sinensis. A. lunanensis was destermined to be distinct from A. sinensis due to its larger size, the relatively shorter upper premolars, and its lower molars having subtle longitudinal grooves on their outer walls and more slanting transverse ridges. A. lunanensis was smaller than Sharamynodon mongoliensis, from which it was also distinguished by relatively narrower third molars but broader second molars, larger canines and shorter premolars, and the more slanting transverse ridges on the lower molars.

In a 2022 faunal overview of the Ergilin Dzo Formation, Tsubamoto et al. classified A. lunanensis as a species of Amynodontopsis, without elaboration.

==== Amynodon sinensis ====
Type jaw of A. sinensis

Amynodon sinensis was described by Otto Zdansky in 1930, based on Late Eocene fossils from Henan, China. The relatively fragmentary fossils included two associated lower jaw fragments (the type specimen), fragments of both right and left upper jaws, and isolated teeth. Zdansky compared the fossils to the amynodont taxa known in his time, and referred them to the genus Amynodon. An additional lower jaw, with two teeth preserved (the first and third molar), was later discovered at the same locality as Zdansky's type specimen and was referred to A. sinensis by Yang Zhongjian in 1937.

In 1965, Zhou Mingzhen and Xu Yu-Xuan referred A. sinensis to the genus Sianodon, as S. sinensis. Zhou and Xu revised the diagnosis of S. sinensis and referred additional fossil material to the species, including two fossils from the same locality as Zdansky's type specimen: a right maxilla preserving the fourth premolar to third molar; IVPP V.3018), a lower jaw fragment that preserves the second and third molar (IVPP V.3018.1). Additional fossils reported by Zhou and Xu included IVPP V.3019 (an upper jaw fragment preserving the fourth premolar to third molar from Yuanqu, Shanxi) and IVPP V.3024 (an upper jaw fragment preserving the first to third molar from Tungchang, a village in Xichuan, Henan). IVPP V.3024 is from the same locality as the type specimens of fellow amynodonts Lushiamynodon obesus and Sianodon chiyuanensis. Zhou and Xu noted that the assignment of many of these fossils to S. sinensis was provisional, since the fossils show considerable variation in their dental features and belong to at least two late Eocene faunal zones.

In 2017, Alexander Averianov, Igor Danilov, Jin Jianhua, and Wang Yingyong questioned the validity of Sianodon as a genus, and recovered S. sinensis separate from the type species (S. bahoensis) in a phylogenetic analysis. Averianov et al. (2017) thus referred to the species under its original combination, as "Amynodon" sinensis. Averianov et al. (2017) further suggested that three fragmentary species of Sianodon found in Henan—S. chiyuanensis, S. honanensis, and S. mienchiensis—could also represent primitive amynodonts and possibly the same taxon as "A". sinensis.

Averianov et al. (2017) determined that A. sinensis occupies an important phylogenetic position, as one of the most primitive amynodonts known from Asia. They also noted that A. sinensis was clearly distinguished by its very small size; at just 127 ± 15 kg (280 ± 33 lbs), A. sinensis is the smallest known amynodont. The cladogram below presents amynodont relations as recovered by Averianov et al. (2017):

- Amynodontidae
  - Rostriamynodon grangeri
  - - Amynodon advenus
    - - Amynodon sinensis
      - - Amynodontopsis bodei
        - - Sharamynodon mongoliensis
          - - Metamynodontini
              ⊞
              - Megalamynodon regalis
              - Metamynodon planifrons
              - Paramynodon birmanicus
              ⊟
            - Cadurcodontini
              ⊞
              - Procadurcodon orientalis
              - Zaisanamynodon borisovi
              - - - Cadurcotherium cayluxi
                  - Cadurcotherium minus
                - - Cadurcodon maomingensis
                  - - Cadurcodon bahoensis
                    - - Cadurcodon ardynensis
                      - Cadurcodon kazakademius
              ⊟

==== Amynodon watanabei ====
Amynodon watanabei was described by Shigeyasu Tokunaga in 1926, originally as Aceratherium? watanabei, based on a partial lower jaw from Ube in Nagato, Japan. The only teeth preserved in the jaw are the third and fourth premolars, and the first molar, which complicated classification of the fossils. Various other generic identifications were proposed for the fossils over the following decades, such as Rhinoceros and Chilotherium. In 1945, Fuyuji Takai suggested that A. watanabei was an amynodont, perhaps belonging to the genus Cadurcotherium. Takai reclassified A. watanabei as a species of Amynodon in 1948, having compared its proportions to A. erectus. Tokanuga believed that A. watanabei was "not older than the Miocene" but the fossils are probably Middle or Late Eocene.

=== Europe ===
==== Amynodon hungaricus ====
Amynodon hungaricus was described by Miklós Kretzoi in 1940, based on a fragmentary right mandible. The only teeth preserved in the mandible are the second and third molars. The locality and age of the fossil is not known for certain, but it is assumed to have been found at Tápiószele and probably dates to the Late Eocene. Later in 1942, Kretzoi remarked that little could be said of A. hungaricus since it is known only from "defective" fossils. He assessed A. hungaricus as morphologically intermediate between Amynodon and Paramynodon, but closest to Amynodon.

== Reassigned species and synonyms ==
=== Amynodon antiquus ===
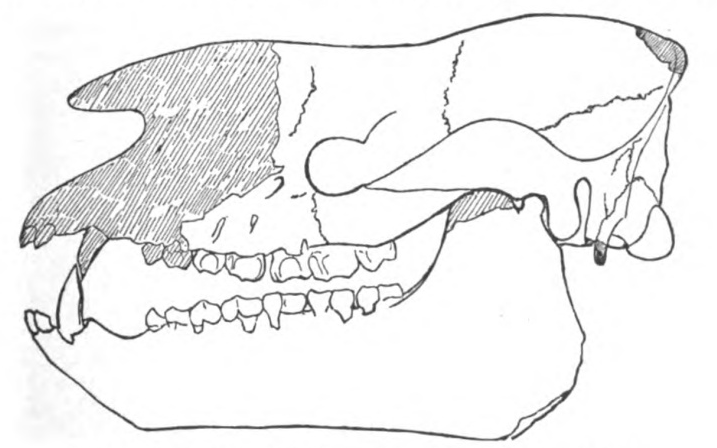
Scott and Osborn's reconstruction of the skull PU 10047, type specimen of "Orthocynodon antiquus"

Orthocynodon antiquus was described by William Berryman Scott and Henry Fairfield Osborn in 1882, based on an associated skull and lower jaw (PU 10047), and another partial skull, found in the Washakie Formation in Wyoming. Scott and Osborn distinguished the fossils from Amynodon due to several features of the teeth; Orthocynodon was described to have more erect canines, a small postero-internal (internal, towards the back) cusp on the upper second and third premolar, and generally more molariform (molar-like) premolars than Amynodon. The Orthocynodon fossils were Bridgerian in age, which predated the original fossils of A. advenus. In 1883, Scott and Osborn described O. antiquus in more detail and established the new family Amynodontidae to contain Orthocynodon and Amynodon.

Othniel Charles Marsh's original description of Amynodon advenus was wrong on several anatomical details since the original skull (YPM 11453) had not been removed from its matrix (surrounding rock) or properly put together before it was described. When YPM 11453 was prepared out of its matrix, Marsh allowed Scott and Osborn to examine the skull and an associated lower jaw. Scott and Osborn found several features in Marsh's skull which they had believed made Orthocynodon distinct, such as erect canines. They designated Orthocynodon as a probable synonym of Amynodon in 1887 and in 1890, Osborn treated O. antiquus as a species of Amynodon (A. antiquus). The only remaining features believed to distinguish A. antiquus as a species were in the premolars; according to Osborn, A. antiquus retains the lower first premolar, a tooth lost in A. advenus, and has a more molariform fourth premolar.

In 1921, Edward Leffingwell Troxell followed Osborn in distinguishing A. antiquus as a species by the lost first premolar, as well as its smaller size. Troxell considered the retention of the first premolar in A. antiquus to be so significant that it might justify treating Orthocynodon as a subgenus. In 1981, John Andrew Wilson and Judith Schiebout found A. antiquus to likely be within the range of variation of A. advenus, and that it differed less from the type material than the differences within a single-population fossil assemblage found in Texas. William P. Wall designated A. antiquus as a synonym of A. advenus in 1982. Wall found that the supposedly distinct features of PU 10047 were due to misinterpretations of the fossil; the type jaw is broken towards the back, and Scott and Osborn misinterpreted the second premolar to third molar as the first premolar to second molar. This means that the first premolar is not actually retained in PU 10047, and that the supposedly molariform premolar is actually just a molar.

=== Amynodon erectus ===
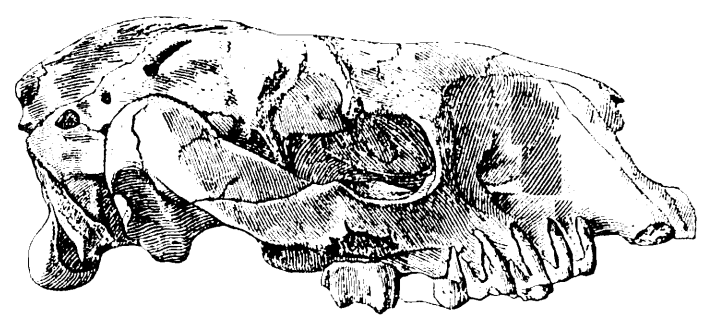
YPM 11453, sometimes argued to be the type specimen of A. advenus, was used by Troxell as the type of A. erectus in 1921

In 1921, Edward Leffingwell Troxell suggested that YPM 11453 was distinct from YPM 11763 on the species level. Both fossils have historically been interpreted as type specimens of A. advenus, due to Othniel Charles Marsh never designating a type specimen, and basing diagnoses on different fossils. The distinguishing features used by Troxell are all in the upper third premolar, since YPM 11763 preserves nothing else. Per Troxell, the upper third premolar of YPM 11453 is smaller, and both its posterior and anterior cingula are stronger. Further, the postsinus (gap behind the posterior cingulum) is deeper, and that the medisinus (gap between the two cingula) is much narrower.

Troxell interpreted YPM 11763 as the type specimen of A. advenus, and thus moved YPM 11453 to a new species, A. erectus. Troxell distinguished A. erectus from A. antiquus by A. erectus having lost its first premolar in both jaws, and being of smaller size, though noted that both had similar erect canines. A. erectus was distinguished from A. intermedius by the larger size of A. intermedius, and A. intermedius having more procumbent canines. In 1981, John Andrew Wilson and Judith Schiebout found A. erectus to likely be within the range of variation of A. advenus, and that it differed less from the type material than the differences within a single-population fossil assemblage found in Texas. In 1982, William P. Wall designated A. erectus as a synonym of A. advenus, also finding that A. erectus was "well within the range" of A. advenus, and that Troxell's distinguishing features were "quite minor".

=== Amynodon giganteus ===
Type tooth of A. giganteus (=Gigantamynodon cessator) (PIN 1379-1)

Amynodon giganteus was described by Vera Gromova in 1958, based on a single third molar from the Ergilin Dzo Formation in Mongolia (PIN 1379-1). Gromova compared the large tooth and its measurements to molars of various amynodont species, particularly Amynodon mongoliensis (=Sharamynodon). Gromova noted that the tooth could belong to the large Gigantamynodon cessator, known from a dentary found in the Ergilin Dzo Formation, but that comparison was impossible since the upper dentition of G. cessator was unknown. A. giganteus has since been considered a synonym of G. cessator.

=== Amynodon intermedius ===
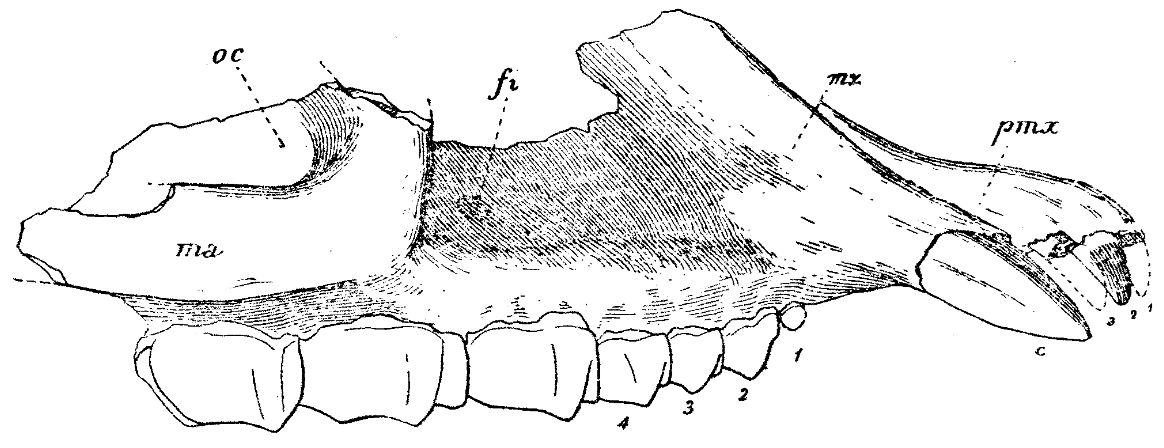
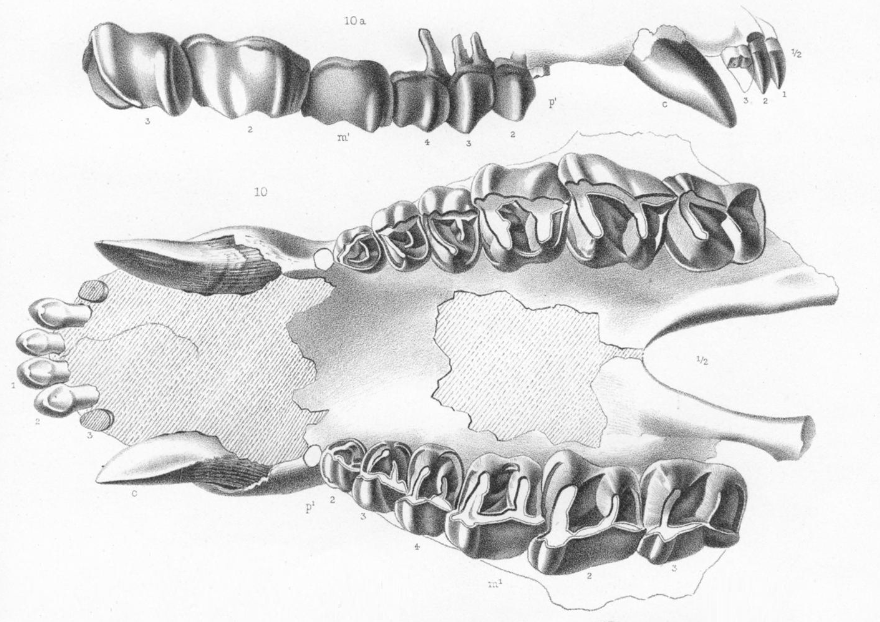
Illustrations of the partial skull PU 10309, type specimen of A. intermedius

Amynodon intermedius was described by Henry Fairfield Osborn in 1890, based on a partial skull (PU 10309) from the Uinta Formation. Osborn distinguished A. intermedius from A. advenus by its larger size, the retention of the upper first premolar, and the procumbent position of the canines in PU 10309. Osborn believed that the then three described Amynodon species formed an evolutionary sequence, with A. antiquus evolving into A. advenus, which then evolved into A. intermedius.

In 1933, Chester Stock proposed that A. intermedius could belong to the genus Amynodontopsis because A. intermedius shared some features with that genus, notably the depth and backward extent of the fossae (grooves in front of the eye orbits). In 1981, John Andrew Wilson and Judith Schiebout found A. intermedius to likely be within the range of variation of A. advenus, and that it differed less from the type material than the differences within a single-population fossil assemblage found in Texas.

In 1982, William P. Wall designated A. intermedius as a synonym of A. advenus. Wall noted that the dental features used to separate the two species were dubious; the first premolar, used in the diagnosis of A. intermedius, is not preserved in the fossil and is present only as a plaster reconstruction. Osborn's claim that the canines of A. intermedius are unusually large and procumbent is also unsupported, since the canines of the type specimen are broken and their original position is indeterminable. Variations in canine size is also explainable via sexual dimorphism. A. intermedius has also been separated from A. advenus by its larger size and its stratigraphic position—A. intermedius is from the "Uinta C" level whereas A. advenus is from "Uinta A" and "B"—but Wall noted that several fossils from Uinta C are in the smaller size range of A. advenus. Stock's suggestion that A. intermedius could be a species of Amynodontopsis was rejected by Wall, who pointed out that the supposed greater extent and depth of the fossae was due to the A. intermedius type skull being crushed. This is easily observed in that the fossae only extend further than normal on one side of the specimen.

=== Amynodon mongoliensis ===
Reconstruction of the A. mongoliensis (=Sharamynodon) type specimen (AMNH 20278)

Amynodon mongoliensis was described by Henry Fairfield Osborn in a 1936 posthumous publication, based on well-preserved fossils from the Shara Murun Formation, found at Ula Usu in Inner Mongolia, China. In the brief description, Osborn compared the fossils to North American Amynodon, especially A. intermedius. A. mongoliensis was reassigned to its own genus, Sharamynodon, by Miklós Kretzoi in 1942, though this apparently went unnoticed by paleontologists in China. The generic distinction of Sharamynodon was reaffirmed by Wall in 1989, and has been largely accepted since. In both 1982 and 1989, Wall suggested that some of the other Asian Amynodon species might belong to Sharamynodon instead.

=== Amynodon tuskabakensis ===
Amynodon tuskabakensis was described by M. D. Biryukov in 1963, based on an isolated third molar found near Lake Zaysan in Kazakhstan. The fragmentary fossil led to various alternate classifications over the subsequent decades. In 1971, Elizaveta Belyaeva referred A. tuskabakensis to the genus Hypsamynodon, and in 1996, Spencer G. Lucas and Robert J. Emry suggested that the species was a synonym of Cadurcodon ardynensis, which has been found close to the A. tuskabakensis type locality.

In 2017, Amynodon tuskabakensis was identified as a species of Cadurcotherium by Alexander Averianov, Igor Danilov, Jin Jianhua, and Wang Yingyong, based on shared derived dental characteristics.
