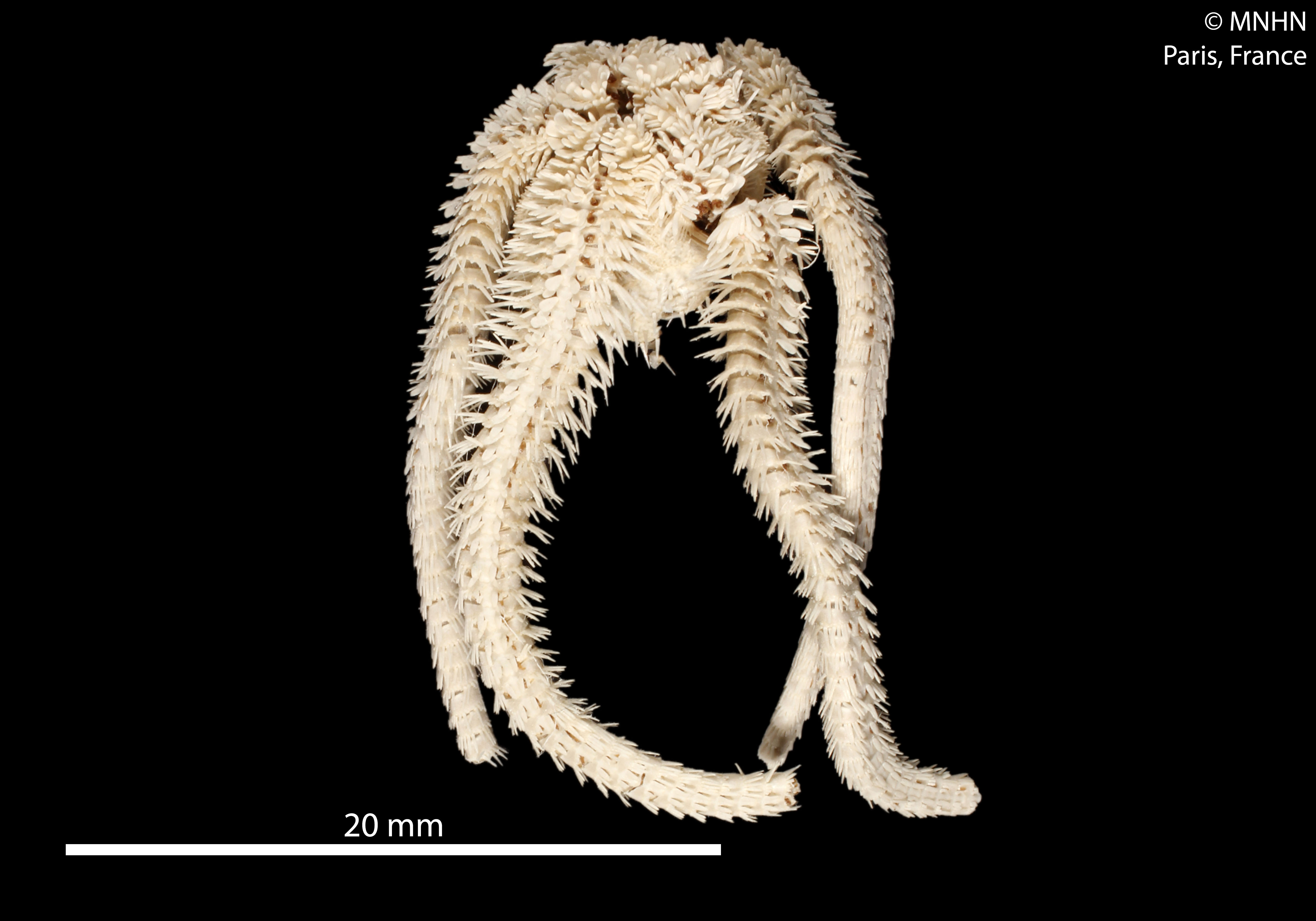
- Dried preserved specimen of Ophiomyces frutectosus

Scientific classification
- Kingdom: Animalia
- Phylum: Echinodermata
- Class: Ophiuroidea
- Order: Ophioscolecida
- Family: Ophiohelidae; Perrier, 1893

Genera
- 4, see text

Synonyms
- Ophiohelinae Perrier, 1893; Ophiomycetidae Verrill, 1899

= Ophiohelidae =

Ophiohelidae Temporal range: 237–0 Ma Late Triassic to Present

Family of brittle stars

Ophiohelidae is a family of echinoderms belonging to the order Ophioscolecida. Fossils from this family have been found dating to the Late Carnian in Late Triassic and also from Late Aptian in Early Cretaceous.

== Taxonomy ==
There are four genera in this family.

- Ophiofujita† Numberger-Thuy, Ishida & Thuy, 2024
- Ophiohelus Lyman, 1880
- Ophiomyces Lyman, 1869
- Ophiotholia Lyman, 1880
