= Tomida Yukimitsu =

Tomida Yukimitsu 冨田幸光
- Born: 1950 (age 75–76)
- Occupation: Palaeontologist
- Employer(s): National Museum of Nature and Science, Tokyo (1981–2015)

Tomida Yukimitsu (冨田幸光) (born 1950) is a Japanese vertebrate palaeontologist. A student of Shikama Tokio, he did his graduate work at the University of Arizona under Everett H. Lindsay, with mentorship also from George Gaylord Simpson. The curator of Mammalian Palaeontology at the National Museum of Nature and Science, Tokyo, from 1981 until his retirement in 2015, he has published on a wide range of terrestrial and marine mammals, dinosaurs, pterosaurs, crocodilians, and bird tracks, with a special focus on smaller mammals — lagomorphs and rodents — and on the fossil record of Japan. His descriptions and studies of Pliopentalagus spp. have shown their closeness to the Amami rabbit (Pentalagus furnessi). Upon his retirement, Tomida was the honorand of a Festschrift in the journal Historical Biology.
