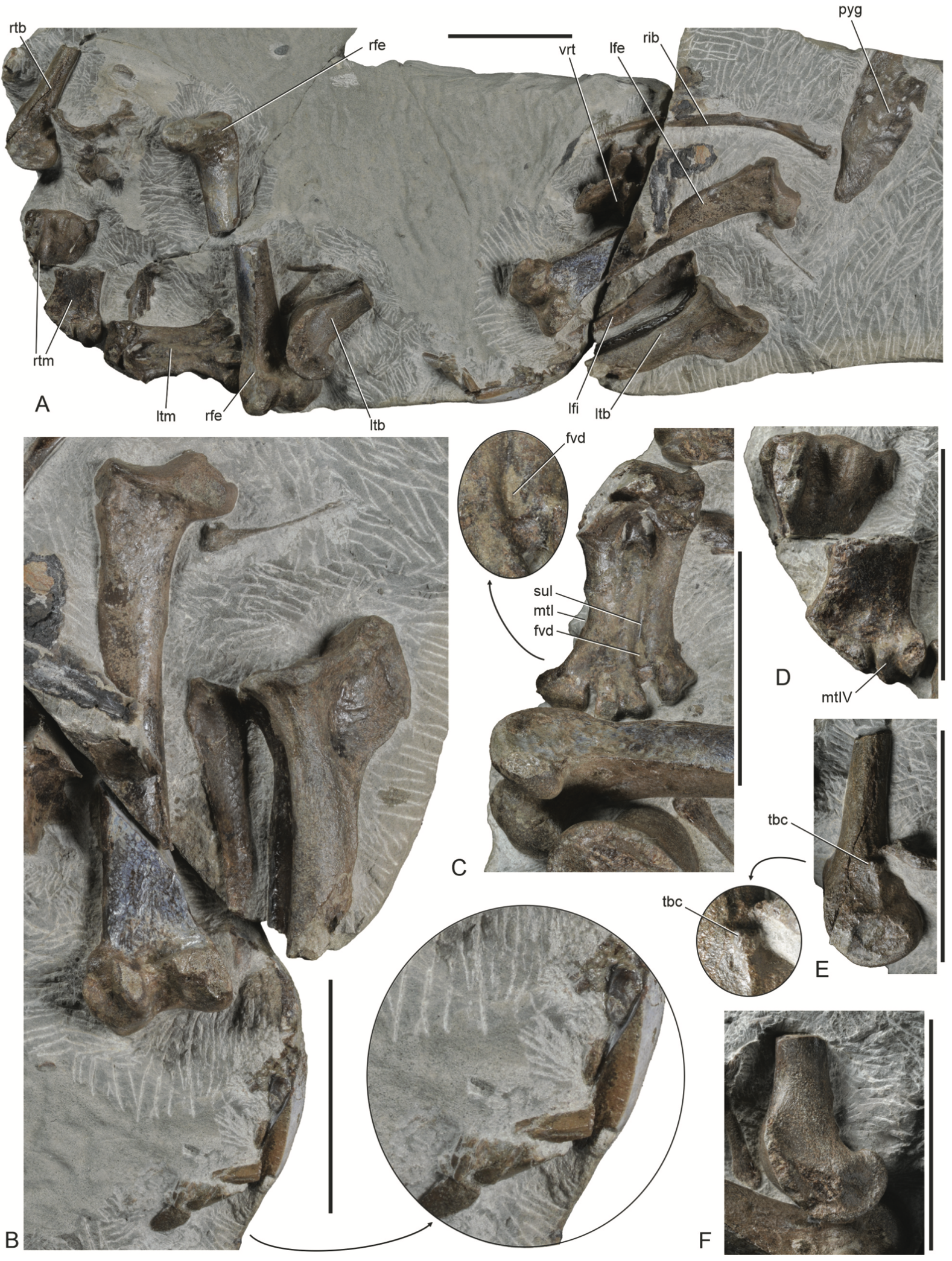
- Multiple images of the holotype of Fucadytes (SMF Av 672)

Scientific classification
- Kingdom: Animalia
- Phylum: Chordata
- Class: Aves
- Order: Suliformes
- Family: †Plotopteridae
- Subfamily: †Tonsalinae
- Genus: †Fucadytes; Mayr & Goedert, 2025

Type species
- † Fucadytes discrepans Mayr & Goedert, 2025

= Fucadytes =

Fucadytes Temporal range: Early Oligocene

Extinct genus of seabirds

Fucadytes is an extinct genus of penguin-like bird in the extinct family Plotopteridae. There is currently only one species contained in this genus, Fucadytes discrepans. It lived in the state of Washington, US during the late Eocene to early Oligocene epoch. Fucadytes had reduced webbing and had a greater motility in its toes.

The discovery of Fucadytes is from a partial fossil skeleton from the Jansen creek member of the Makah formation.
