= Oriensarctos =

Oriensarctos Temporal range: Pleistocene

Scientific classification
- Kingdom: Animalia
- Phylum: Chordata
- Class: Mammalia
- Order: Carnivora
- Suborder: Caniformia
- Parvorder: Pinnipedia
- Family: Otariidae
- Genus: †Oriensarctos; Mitchell, 1968
- Species: †O. watasei

Binomial name
- †Oriensarctos watasei (Matsumoto, 1925)

Synonyms
- Species synonymy: Eumetopias watasei Matsumoto, 1925

Extinct genus of mammals

Oriensarctos is an extinct genus of pinniped that inhabited Japan during the Pleistocene epoch. It is a monotypic genus known from the species Oriensarctos watasei.
