= Iida City Museum =

Museum in Iida, Japan

- 飯田市美術博物館
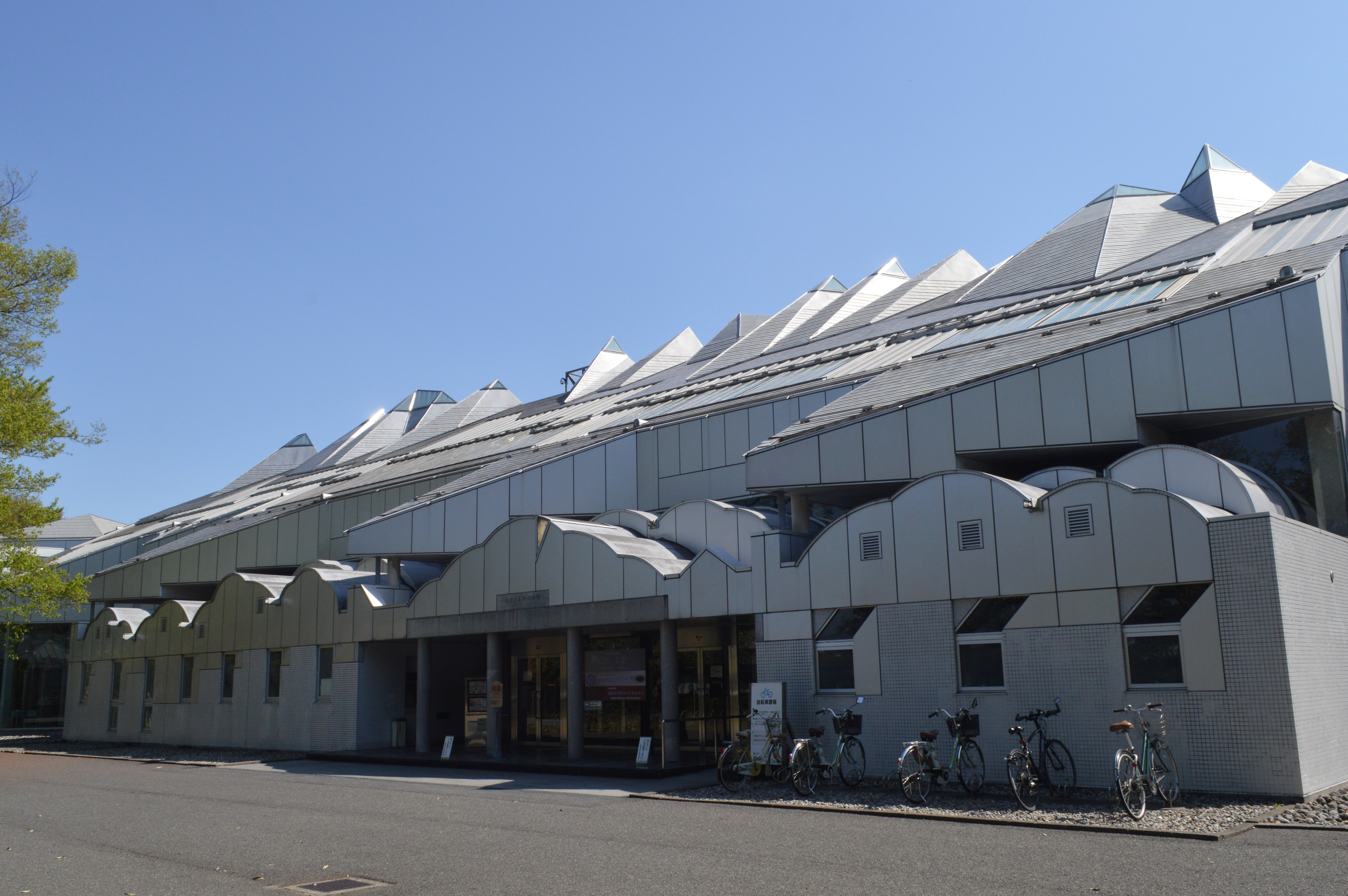
- Interactive map of the Iida City Museum area

General information
- Location: 2-655-7 Ōte-machi, Iida, Nagano Prefecture, Japan
- Coordinates: 35°30′43″N 137°49′50″E
- Opened: October 1989

Website
- Official website

Iida City Museum (飯田市美術博物館, Iida-shi bijutsu hakubutsu-kan) opened in Iida, Nagano Prefecture, Japan in 1989. The museum's collections and display relate to the natural history, history, and art of the area and include a number of works by Hishida Shunsō, who was born locally.

== See also ==
- Nagano Prefectural Museum of History
