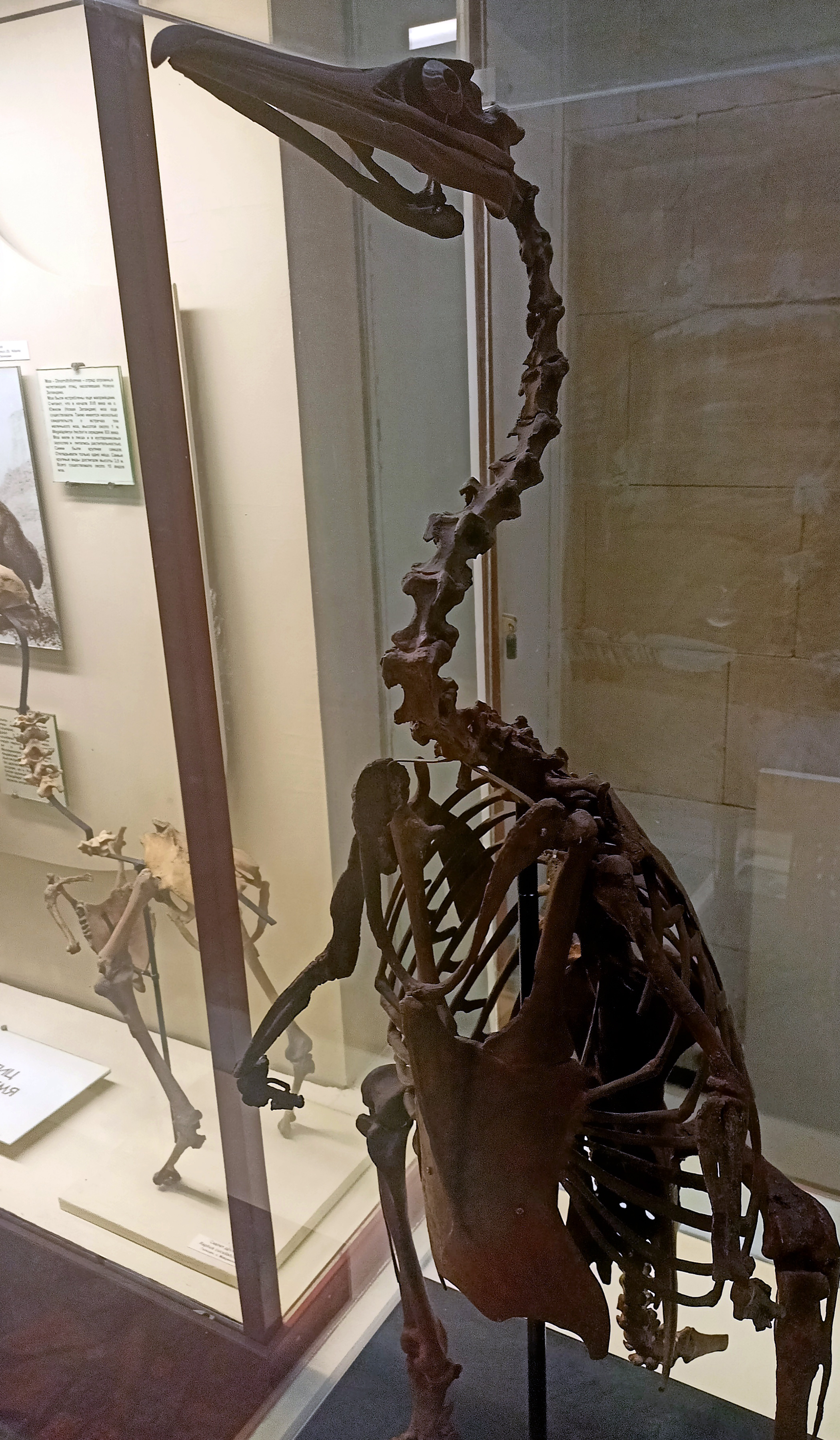
- Skeletal reconstruction of Copepteryx hexeris

Scientific classification
- Kingdom: Animalia
- Phylum: Chordata
- Class: Aves
- Order: Suliformes
- Family: †Plotopteridae
- Subfamily: †Tonsalinae
- Genus: †Copepteryx; Olson & Hasegawa, 1996

Species
- Copepteryx hexeris; Copepteryx titan

= Copepteryx =

Copepteryx Temporal range: Oligocene ~32–30 Ma

Extinct genus of birds

Copepteryx is an extinct genus of flightless bird of the family Plotopteridae, endemic to Japan during the Oligocene living from 28.4 to 23 mya, meaning it existed for approximately 5.4 million years.

== History and Etymology ==
Remains of large, flightless suliformes in Japan are known since the 1970s. In 1979, Storrs L. Olson and Hasegawa Yoshikazu identified them as those of plotopterids, but their abundance and diversity complicated their identification as distinct species. In 1996, the two first species endemic from Japan were described by Olson and Hasegawa. Both species were identified as belonging to the same genus, Copepterix. The type species, C. hexeris, was described after a partially articulated skeleton, KMNH VP 200,006, collected in 1977 by Hasegawa himself on Ainoshima, in rocks dated from the Late Oligocene of the Ainoshima Formation. As paratypes were considered another associated skeleton from the Yamaga Formation, a fragmentary tibiotarsus and a mandible from the Ainoshima Formation, a femur from the Asagai Sandstone Formation, and a tarsometatarsus from the Shioda Bed. In the same publication was also described another, larger species of Copepterix, C. titan, collected in 1983 by Ikeuchi Hideo in Ainoshima, with the left femur KMNH VP 200,004 as holotype.

In 2008, Sakurai, Kimura and Katoh removed the Shioda Bed tarsometatarsus from the genus, on the basis of its fragmentary nature disabling the possibility to compare it either to Copepteryx or to the then-newly erected genus Hokkaidornis, and were critical of the referral of specimens collected outside of Ainoshima to Copepteryx.

In 2009, Okazaki Yoshihiko referred to the genus an additional furcula, discovered in the Late Eocene to Early Oligocene of the Kishima Formation on Hikoshima. In 2020, Ohashi Tomoyuki and Hasegawa Yoshikazu assigned to the genus an additional left coracoid from the Yamaga Formation.

=== Etymology ===
The name is derived from the Ancient Greek prefix "Kope-", meaning “oar”, and "pteryx", meaning wing. The name refers to the characteristic oar-like wings, and the apparent reference to the 19th Century paleontologist Edward Drinker Cope is purely accidental.

== Description ==
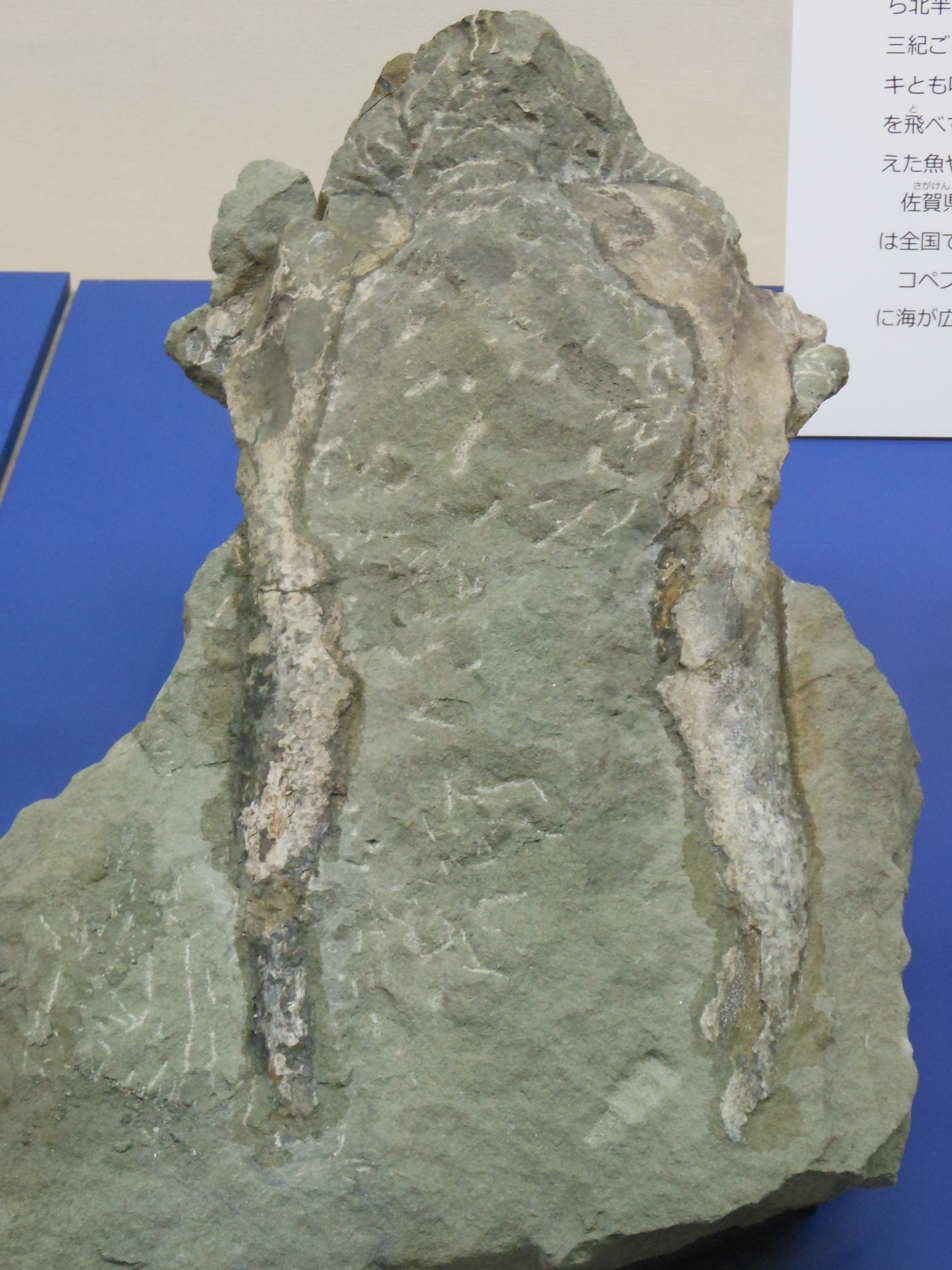
Fossil sternum from Kitahata Karatsu, Japan

Copepteryx was a large-sized diving plotopterid bird, roughly similar to the contemporaneous giant penguins from the South Pacific, such as Waimanu. The sternum shared several similarities with pelecaniformes, and an estimated number of five ribs were articulated with it. The furcula, strongly aligned with the sternum, was large and robust and shared its strong ovoid articulation with the coracoid with most modern pelecaniformes. The coracoid was itself typical of plotopterid, with an elongated shaft and a distinctively modified scapular end. The poorly preserved scapula was similar to Tonsala. The pelvis, mostly reconstructed from impressions, shared the butterfly shape of its iliac shields with the Sulidae. The pre and post-acetabular parts of the sternul were similar-sized.

The wings were, as in all plotopterids, heavily specialized for underwater propulsion and in general shape and usage much different from all other known pelecaniformes. The proximal end of the humerus was round-shaped like that of Tonsala, while the distal end was flattened and very similar to that of unrelated Alcidae like Pinguinus and Mancalla. The radius was short and similarly flattened, while the small ulna supported pits where the quills were attached, as in Tonsala. The anatomy of the elongated metacarpal was typical of that of wing-propelled diving birds. The leg bones shared more similarities with those of Aninghidae than those of other suliformes, although the tarsometatarsus was much shorter and more typical of those of Phalacrocoracidae.

== Species ==
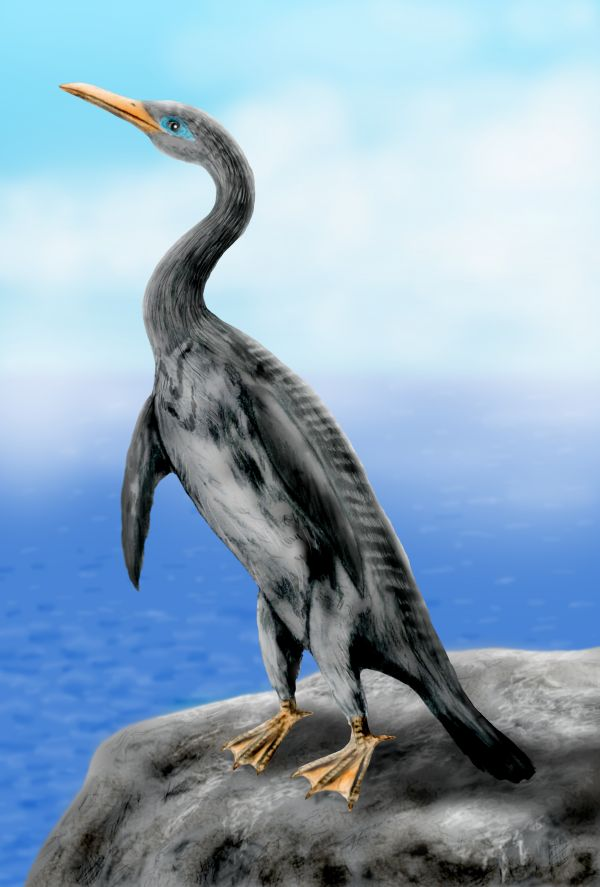
Restoration of Copepteryx hexeris

=== Copepteryx hexeris ===
C. hexeris is the type species and best known species of Copepteryx. With total length about 1.2 metres (3.9 ft), while it is smaller than its lesser known relative C. titan, it was larger than all other known plotopterids. It is known from the Late Oligocene of the Ainoshima Formation, the Yamaga Formation, the Asagai Sandstone Formation and the Shioda Bed. The species name, hexeris, designates in Latin an hexereme, a type of Roman warship.

=== Copepteryx titan ===
C. titan is the largest species of plotopterid described, with an estimated total length around 2 metres (6.6 ft), once even overestimated about 3 metres (9.8 ft), although some yet undescribed remains might have belonged to an animal even larger. Only known from a 22 centimetres (8.7 in) long and 6 centimetres (2.4 in) wide left femur, much larger than that of any other known plotopterid and twice as large as that of the emperor penguin, it differs slightly from the femur of Copepteryx. The complete animal, scaled after C. hexeris, was probably among the largest non-flying water birds, and possibly larger than the largest species of giant penguins. The species is only known from the Ainoshima Formation. It has recently been suggested that C. titan would in fact represent the remains of male C. hexeris, as sexual dimorphism is often important in modern genera of cormorants and darters. The species name, titan, was given in reference to the Titans, alluding to the large size of the holotype femur.
