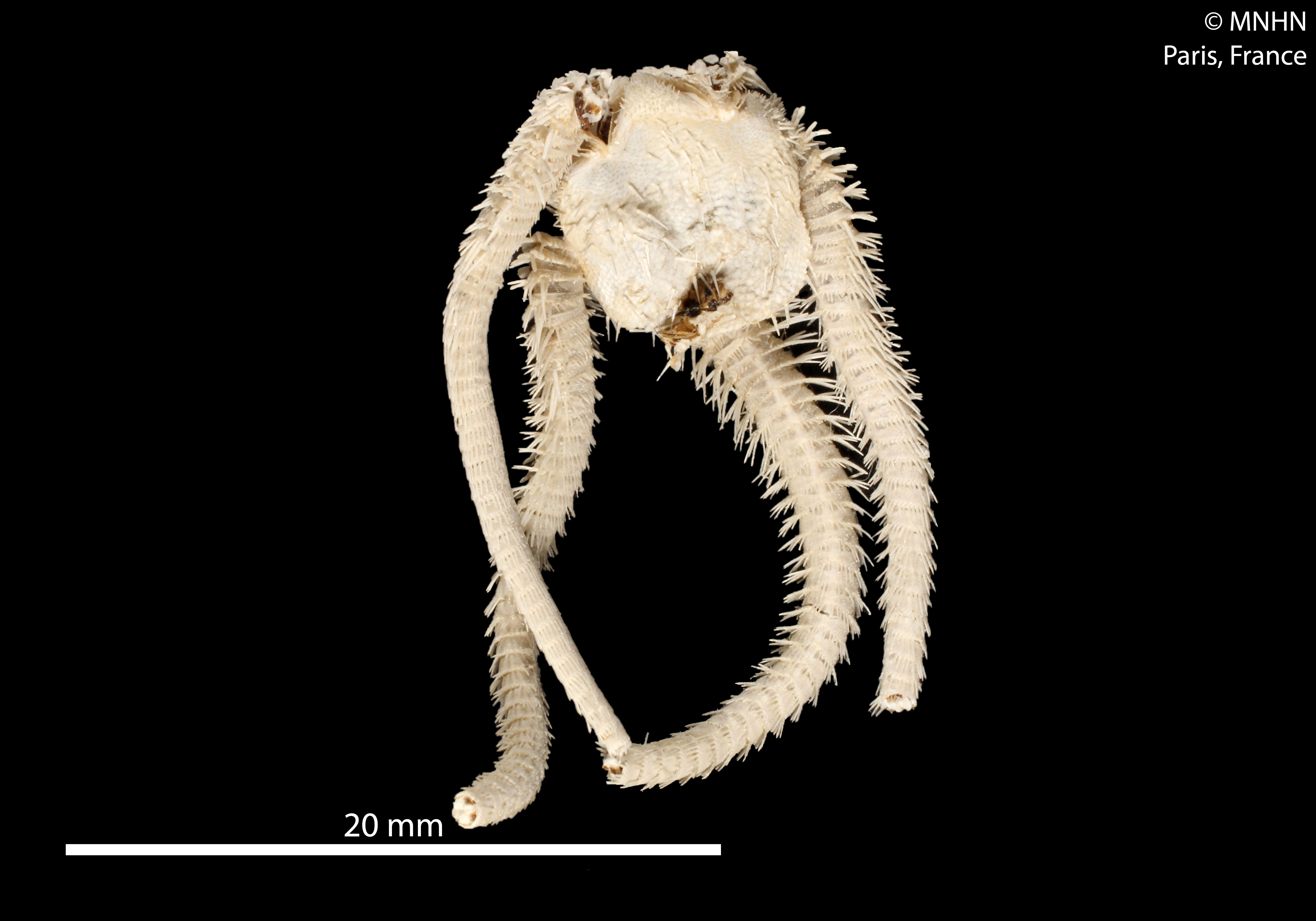
- Dried preserved specimen of Ophiomyces frutectosus

Scientific classification
- Kingdom: Animalia
- Phylum: Echinodermata
- Class: Ophiuroidea
- Superorder: Ophintegrida
- Order: Ophioscolecida; O'Hara, Hugall, Thuy, Stöhr & Martynov, 2017

Families
- 4, see text

= Ophioscolecida =

Ophioscolecida Temporal range: 330.3–0 Ma Lower Carboniferous to Present

Order of brittle stars

Ophioscolecida is an order of echinoderms belonging to the class Ophiuroidea. The earliest fossils of members from Ophioscolecida (Suchaster†) date back to the Serpukhovian in the Mississippian age (Lower Carboniferous). Fossils from this order have also been found dating to the Late Carnian in Late Triassic and Late Aptian in Early Cretaceous.

== Taxonomy ==
There are three recognized families and one family with a temporary name which contains an extinct genus.

- Abyssuridae Martynov & Korshunova, 2025
- Ophiohelidae Perrier, 1893
- Ophioscolecidae Lütken, 1869
- Ophioscolecida incertae sedis
  - Suchaster† Smith, Thuy, Sain & Sumrall, 2025
