= Land bridges of Japan =

Due to changes in sea level, Japan has at various times been connected to the continent by land bridges (陸橋, rikukyō), with continental Russia to the north via the Sōya Strait, Sakhalin, and the Mamiya Strait, and with the Korean Peninsula to the southwest, via the Tsushima Strait and Korea Strait. Land bridges also connected the Japanese Islands with each other. These land bridges enabled the migration of terrestrial fauna from the continent and their dispersal within Japan.

Notable past (purple) and current (orange) land bridges on a bathymetric equirectangular projection centred on 45° E

== Geological background ==
Around 25 million years ago, the Sea of Japan began to open, separating Japan from the continent and giving rise to the Japanese island arc system of today. The Sea of Japan as a back-arc basin was open both to the northeast and to the southwest by 14 Ma, while marine transgression further contributed to the isolation and insulation of Japan. Due to the level of tectonic activity in the area and significant subsidence of the Japanese Islands since the Miocene, exact quantification of historic sea level changes is problematic.

== Northern land bridge ==
Based on current depths, a 55 m (180 ft) reduction in sea level would be sufficient to connect Hokkaidō with the mainland. The Sōya land bridge (宗谷陸橋) and Mamiya land bridge (間宮陸橋) — sometimes referred to jointly as the Saghalien land bridge (樺太陸橋) or Sakhalin land bridge — are thus thought to have been in place during most glacial periods.

== Western land bridge ==
With a minimum depth of 130 m (430 ft) and based in part on the appearance in Japan of Proboscidea, the Tsushima land bridge (津軽陸橋) and Korean land bridge (朝鮮陸橋) — sometimes referred to jointly as the Korean land bridge — are understood to have been in place at 1.2 Ma, 0.63 Ma, and 0.43 Ma.

== Kuril land bridge ==
A Kuril land bridge (千島陸橋) has been insufficient to connect Hokkaidō with Kamchatka during the Quaternary. The southern Kuril land bridge that connected Kunashiri and the Lesser Kurils to Hokkaidō during the Early Holocene was insufficient with the rising sea level at around 6,000 BP.

== Seto land bridges ==
Honshū, Shikoku, and Kyūshū are separated by shallow straits that rarely exceed 50 m (160 ft) in depth. Consequently, they were frequently connected together as a single land mass.

== Tsugaru land bridge ==
The Tsugaru Strait, with a depth in excess of 130 metres (430 ft), represents a more significant faunal boundary, known as Blakiston's Line. The most recent age of the Tsugaru land bridge (津軽陸橋) is uncertain.

== Ryūkyū land bridge ==
The Ryūkyū Islands, separated by deeper straits still (the Tokara Gap), have been isolated from the main islands throughout the Quaternary. The Ryūkyū land bridge (琉球陸橋) was sufficient temporarily to connect Miyako-jima with Taiwan during the late Middle Pleistocene, allowing for the migration of the Steppe mammoth (Mammuthus trogontherii). During this period, the Miyako Strait was sufficient to prevent the land bridge reaching Okinawa Island.

== See also ==
- List of prehistoric mammals of Japan
