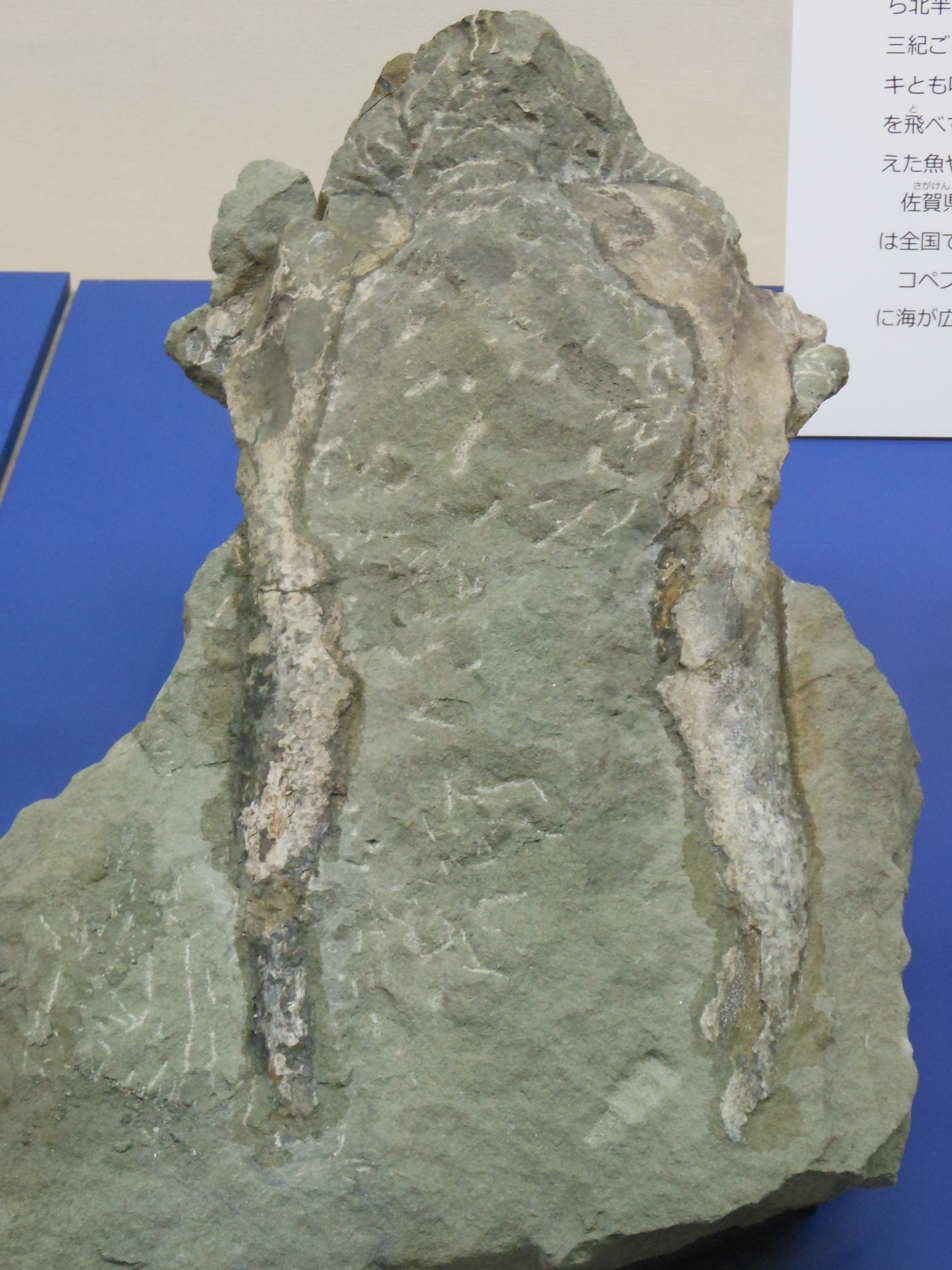
- A fossil sternum of Copepteryx from the Oligocene epoch of Japan.

Scientific classification
- Kingdom: Animalia
- Phylum: Chordata
- Class: Aves
- Order: Suliformes
- Family: †Plotopteridae; Howard, 1969

Genera
- †Empeirodytes; †Phocavis; †Plotopterum; †Stemec; †Stenornis; †Tonsalinae Mayr & Goedert, 2018; †Copepteryx; †Fucadytes; †Hokkaidornis; †Klallamornis; †Olympidytes; †Tonsala

= Plotopteridae =

Plotopterids Temporal range: Eocene – Miocene ~Priabonian–Burdigalian

Extinct family of sea birds

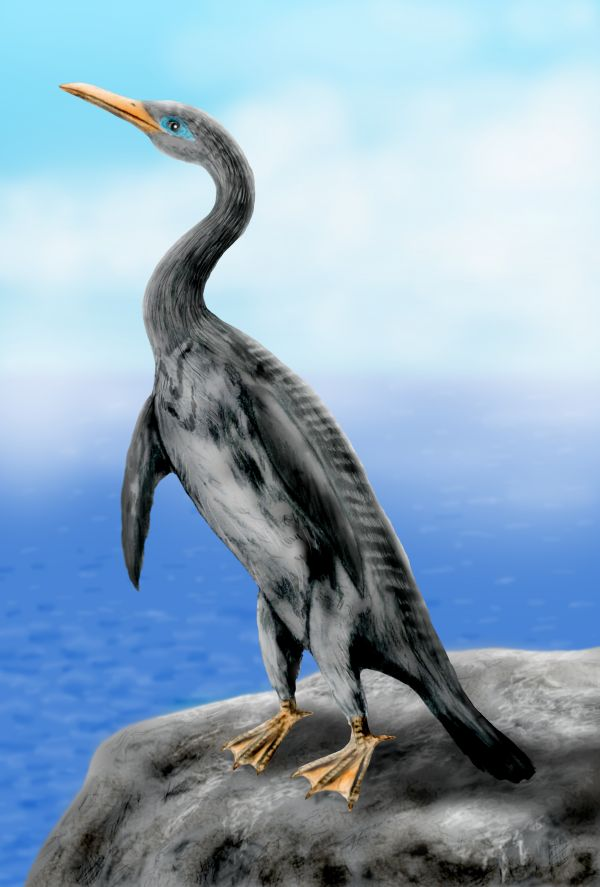
Reconstruction of Copepteryx.

Plotopteridae is an extinct family of flightless seabirds that lived in the Northern Pacific from the Eocene to Miocene epoch.

Plotopterids ranged in size from that of a large cormorant, such as a Brandt's cormorant (Urile penicillatus), to very large sizes. Some species had femur lengths two times longer than the emperor penguin (Aptenodytes forsteri). They had shortened wings that were optimised for underwater wing-propelled pursuit diving similar to penguins or the now extinct great auk (Pinguinus impennis). They had a body skeleton similar to that of the darter.

== Taxonomy ==
They have uncertain placement, generally considered as member of order Suliformes which includes sulids such as gannets and boobies, frigatebirds, cormorants and darters. Plotopterids are regarded as closely related to Anhingidae (darters) and Phalacrocoracidae (cormorants). On the other hand, there is a theory that this group may have a common ancestor with penguins due to the similarity of forelimb and brain morphology. However, the endocast morphology of stem group Sphenisciformes differs from both Plotopteridae and modern penguins.

Plotopterids were not closely related to penguins annd instead exhibited remarkable convergent evolution with penguins and in particular with the now extinct giant penguins. They differ from modern penguins in that they lived in the Northern Pacific Ocean which is located on the other side of the world from where penguins lives. This has led Plotopterids to them being described at times as the Northern Hemisphere's penguins, More recent studies have shown that the shoulder-girdle, forelimb and sternum of plotopterids differ significantly from those of penguins. This means that comparisons in terms of function may not be entirely accurate.

=== Evolution ===
They seem to have evolved in the arctic islands during the mid-Eocene. From there, they would spread southwards with the formation of kelp forests. The earliest known member of the family, Phocavis maritimus lived during the late Eocene, but most of the known species lived during Oligocene. Plotopterids would become extinct in the early to mid-Miocene. That they became extinct at the same time as the giant penguins of the Southern Hemisphere, which also coincided with the radiation of the seals and dolphins, has led to speculation that the expansion of marine mammals was responsible for the extinction of the Plotopteridae, though this has not been formally tested.

== Distribution ==
Plotopterids lived throughout much of the Northern Pacific. Their fossils have been found in California, Oregon, Washington, British Columbia, Hokkaido, Tōhoku, Chūbu and Kyushu.
