= Awadelphis =

Awadelphis Temporal range: Late Miocene 6.3–5.7 Ma

Scientific classification
- Kingdom: Animalia
- Phylum: Chordata
- Class: Mammalia
- Order: Artiodactyla
- Infraorder: Cetacea
- Superfamily: Inioidea
- Family: incertae sedis
- Genus: †Awadelphis; Murakami, 2016
- Species: †A. hirayamai

Binomial name
- †Awadelphis hirayamai Murakami, 2016

Extinct species of dolphin

Awadelphis hirayamai is a species of extinct oceanic river dolphin discovered in the Senhata Formation of Japan dating around 6 million years ago (mya). The genus name derives from Awa, an ancient name for the Chiba Prefecture where the holotype specimen was collected, and Ancient Greek delphis meaning "dolphin"; the species name honors the discoverer of the holotype, Ren Hirayama. It may have inhabited a subpolar environment. Awadelphis and other river dolphins of the Late Miocene may have been in abundance due to the decline of competing ancient dolphins and porpoises.
