= Shiriyanetta =

Shiriyanetta Temporal range: Mid Pleistocene - Late Pleistocene

Scientific classification
- Kingdom: Animalia
- Phylum: Chordata
- Class: Aves
- Order: Anseriformes
- Family: Anatidae
- Genus: †Shiriyanetta
- Species: †S. hasegawai

Binomial name
- †Shiriyanetta hasegawai Watanabe et al 2015

Extinct species of bird

Shiriyanetta hasegawai is an extinct species of seaduck from the Pleistocene of Japan. It was flightless, similar to the also extinct Chendytes from the opposite side of the Pacific.
