= Matsumoto Hikoshichirō =

Japanese palaeontologist

- 松本彦七郎
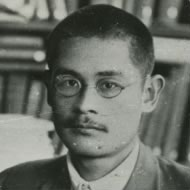
- Born: 9 June 1887
- Died: 1 September 1975 (aged 88)
- Education: Tokyo Imperial University
- Known for: First modern classification of brittle stars
- Awards: Imperial Academy Prize (1921); Order of the Sacred Treasure, Fourth Class (1931); Order of the Sacred Treasure, Third Class (1961)
- Scientific career
- Fields: Zoology, paleontology, archaeology
- Workplaces: Tohoku Imperial University; Fukushima Medical University
- Author abbrev. (zoology): Matsumoto

Matsumoto Hikoshichirō (Japanese: 松本彦七郎) (1887–1975) was a Japanese zoologist, palaeontologist, and archaeologist, and a recipient of the Imperial Academy Prize.

== Biography ==
Born in Meiji 20 (1887), Matsumoto graduated from the Department of Zoology, Tokyo Imperial University, in 1911. From 1914 to 1933 he taught at Tohoku Imperial University, initially as a lecturer, then from 1922 as a professor in the Department of Geology and Paleontology. From 1955, he was professor of biology at Fukushima Medical University, where he taught basic medicine. In 1921, he was awarded the Imperial Academy Prize in recognition of his work on brittle stars (Ophiuroidea). His contributions to the field of vertebrate palaeontology include descriptions of the Akebono elephant (Stegodon aurorae) and Hanaizumi bison (Bison hanaizumiensis), while as an archaeologist he helped develop typologies of Jōmon ceramics. Matsumoto died in 1975.

== See also ==
- Category:Taxa named by Matsumoto Hikoshichirō
