= Yamaga Formation =

Geologic formation in Japan

- Coordinates: 33°59′49″N 130°48′55″E

Composition
- Palaeontological Formation

The Yamaga Formation is a palaeontological formation located in Japan. It dates to the Upper Oligocene period.

== See also ==
- List of fossil sites
