= Shigeyasu Tokunaga =

Japanese palaeontologist (1874–1940)

- 徳永重康
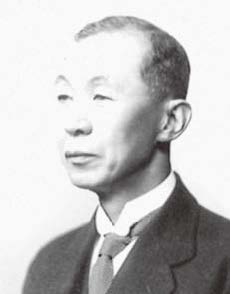
- Born: Shigeyasu Yoshiwara (吉原重康); 20 August 1874; Atago, Shiba, Minato, Tokyo
- Died: 8 February 1940 (aged 65)
- Known for: Palaeontology
- Parents: Shigetaka Yoshiwara 吉原重隆 (father); Motoko Shibata (柴田元子) (mother)

Shigeyasu Tokunaga

Japanese name
- Hiragana: とくなが しげやす
- Shinjitai: 徳永重康
Transcriptions
- Revised Hepburn: Tokunaga Shigeyasu
- Traditional Hepburn: Tokunaga Shigeyasu
- Kunrei-shiki: Tokunaga Sigeyasu
- Nihon-shiki: Tokunaga Sigeyasu

Shigeyasu Tokunaga (徳永重康) (1874–1940) was a Japanese zoologist, geologist, and palaeontologist. His family name by birth was Yoshiwara (吉原) and some of his papers were published under this name.

== Biography ==
Shigeyasu Tokunaga was born in Atago, Tokyo on 20 August 1874 (Meiji 7). His father was a private secretary to the Shimazu clan, while his paternal grandfather had served the Satsuma Domain in Edo. His maternal grandfather was the pharmacologist Shibata Shōkei, his maternal uncle the chemist Shibata Yūji.

In 1894, Shigeyasu enrolled as a student in the Department of Zoology at the Imperial University, Tokyo, where he also attended lectures and classes in the Department of Geology. As a graduate student at Tokyo Imperial University, he studied under Bunjirō Kotō, Yokoyama Matajirō, and Jinbo Kotora, among others.

His 1902 paper coauthored with Jūzō Iwasaki (岩崎重三) on the fossil skull to which in 1914 they would give the name Desmostylus japonicus was the first description of a Japanese Miocene mammal. He went on to conduct geological surveys of Karafuto, the Ryūkyū Islands, Taiwan, Korea, and China, with coal a particular specialism. From 1910 he was professor in the Faculty of Science and Engineering at Waseda University. In 1936 he became chairman of the Paleontological Society of Japan and in 1937 of the Geological Society of Japan.

Tokunaga was a devotee of Noh: he studied under the sōke of the Hōshō school and performed on stage over three hundred times, particularly in plays of the fourth and fifth categories, appearing in later life also in elderly female roles in plays including Sotoba Komachi. His wife edited volumes of tanka, while their eldest son Tokunaga Yasumoto was a specialist in Hungarian literature and professor at Tokyo University of Foreign Studies. Tokunaga died on 8 February 1940 (Shōwa 15).
