= Hasegawa Yoshikazu =

Japanese palaeontologist (1930–2026)

Yoshikazu Hasegawa
- 長谷川 善和
- Born: 12 March 1930; Iida, Nagano Prefecture, Japan
- Died: 2 September 2026 (aged 96)
- Education: Yokohama National University; University of Tokyo
- Occupation: Palaeontologist
- Employer: Yokohama National University

Yoshikazu Hasegawa (長谷川 善和) (12 March 1930 – 2 September 2026) was a Japanese vertebrate palaeontologist and honorary museum director. The Pleistocene anatid Shiriyanetta hasegawai was named in his honour, in recognition of his "outstanding contributions" to the field.

== Life and career ==
Born in Iida, Nagano Prefecture on 12 March 1930, Yoshikazu graduated from Yokohama National University in 1955, earning his doctorate from the University of Tokyo with a study of Palaeoloxodon naumanni in 1972.

Yoshikazu was a part-time lecturer at various times at Yokohama National University, the University of Tokyo, Hiroshima University, Kyoto University, Nagoya University, Shizuoka University, Tohoku University, and the University of the Ryukyus, as well as Researcher and Senior Researcher at the National Science Museum, Tokyo. From 1979 until his retirement in 1995 he was Professor at Yokohama National University. In 1996, he became the first director of Gunma Museum of Natural History. He also contributed to the operations and displays at Iida City Museum, Iwaki City Coal & Fossil Museum, Kanagawa Prefectural Museum of Natural History, Kitakyushu Museum of Natural History, Mine City Museum of History and Folklore (美祢市歴史民俗資料館), and Natural History Museum and Institute, Chiba. Internationally, he was involved in research in Europe, the Americas, Madagascar, Ethiopia, the Soviet Union, China, South Korea, and Australia. His work had a particular emphasis on dinosaurs and palaeornithology.

Yoshikazu died on 2 September 2026, at the age of 96.

== See also ==
- Taxa described by Hasegawa Yoshikazu
