= Shikama Tokio =

Shikama Tokio 鹿間時夫
- Born: 1912
- Died: 1978 (aged 65–66)
- Occupation: Palaeontologist

Shikama Tokio (鹿間時夫) (1912–1978) was a Japanese vertebrate palaeontologist. Considered the leading Japanese figure in the field in the immediate pre- and post-war years, species he described include Yabe's giant deer (Sinomegaceros yabei).
