= List of natural history museums =

This is a list of natural history museums whose exhibits focus on the subject of natural history, including such topics as animals, plants, ecosystems, geology, paleontology, and climatology. Some museums feature natural-history collections in addition to other collections, such as ones related to history, art and science. In addition, nature centers often include natural history exhibits.

== Africa ==
=== Algeria ===
- Beni Abbes Museum (Musee de Beni-Abbes), Béni Abbès

=== Angola ===
- National Museum of Natural History of Angola (Museu Nacional de História Natural de Angola), Luanda

=== Botswana ===
- Botswana National Museum, Gaborone

=== Egypt ===
- Egyptian Geological Museum, Cairo
- Alexandria Aquarium Museum, Alexandria

=== Ethiopia ===
- Zoological Natural History Museum, Addis Ababa

=== Kenya ===
- Kitale Museum, Kitale
- National Museums of Kenya, Nairobi

=== Mozambique ===
- Museu de História Natural de Moçambique, Maputo

=== Namibia ===
- National Earth Science Museum, Geological Survey of Namibia, Windhoek

=== Nigeria ===
- Natural History Museum, OAU, Ifẹ, located at the Obafemi Awolowo University

=== South Africa ===
- Albany Museum, Grahamstown
- Amathole Museum, King William's Town
- Bleloch Geological Museum, University of the Witwatersrand, Johannesburg
- Wits Life Sciences Museum, University of the Witwatersrand, Johannesburg
- CP Nel Museum, Oudtshoorn
- Natural Science Museum, Durban
- Iziko South African Museum, Cape Town
- McGregor Museum, Kimberley
- KwaZulu-Natal Museum, Pietermaritzburg
- National Museum, Bloemfontein
- Port Elizabeth Museum, Port Elizabeth
- Ditsong National Museum of Natural History, Pretoria
- West Coast Fossil Park, Langebaanweg

=== Sudan ===
- Sudan Natural History Museum, Khartoum

=== Tanzania ===
- Olduvai Gorge Museum, Ngorongoro Conservation Area

=== Tunisia ===
- Musée Océanographique de Salammbô, Carthage

=== Uganda ===
- Zoology Museum, Makarere University, Kampala
- Makerere University Herbarium, Makarere University, Kampala
- Uganda Museum, Kampala
- Herbarium, Institute of Tropical Forest Conservation, Kabale

=== Zimbabwe ===
- Natural History Museum of Zimbabwe, Bulawayo

== Asia ==
=== Armenia ===
- Geological Museum, Yerevan
- Natural History Museum, Yerevan

=== Azerbaijan ===
- Natural History Museum named after Hasanbey Zardabi, Baku
- Azerbaijan Geology Museum, Baku
- "Rinay" Malacofauna Museum, Baku

=== China ===
- Baoding Natural History Museum, Baoding
- Paleozoological Museum of China, Beijing
- National Natural History Museum of China, Beijing
- Geological Museum of China, Beijing
- Jilin Museum of Natural History, Changchun
- Bird Fossil National Geopark, Chaoyang
- Chaoyang Paleontological Museum, Chaoyang
- Chongqing Natural History Museum, Chongqing
- Dalian Natural History Museum, Dalian
- Geological Museum of Guizhou, Guiyang
- Zhejiang Museum of Natural History, Hangzhou
- Neimenggu Museum of Natural History, Huhhot
- Guangxi Museum of Natural History, Nanning
- Tianyu Museum of Natural History, Pingyi
- Shanghai Natural History Museum, Shanghai
- Tianjin Natural History Museum, Tianjin
- Wuhan Museum of Natural History, Wuhan
- Shanxi Museum of Natural History, Xi'an
- Zigong Dinosaur Museum, Zigong

=== Hong Kong ===
- Stephen Hui Geological Museum, the University of Hong Kong, Hong Kong

=== India ===
- Bengal Natural History Museum, Darjeeling
- Chhatrapati Shivaji Maharaj Vastu Sangrahalaya, Museum of Western India, Mumbai
- Gass Forest Museum, Coimbatore
- Government Museum, Egmore, Chennai
- Indian Museum, Kolkata
- Napier Museum, Kerala
- National Museum of Natural History, New Delhi (1972–2016)
- Thar Natural History Fossil Museum Churu, Rajasthan
- Bombay Natural History Society (BNHS)
- Thiruvananthapuram Natural History Museum

=== Indonesia ===
- Bandung Geological Museum, Bandung
- Bogor Zoology Museum, Bogor
- Bukittinggi Zoological Museum, Bukittingi
- Gedong Arca Museum, Bali
- Museum Geologi Bandung, Bandung
- Museum Gunung Merapi, Yogyakarta
- Museum Karst, Wonogiri
- Museum Sulawesi Tengah, Palu
- Rahmat International Wildlife Museum & Gallery
- Sri Baduga Museum
- Zoological Museum of Pematangsiantar, Pematangsiantar
- Bali Shell Museum, Bali
- Bogor Zoological Museum Kebun Raya Bogor, Bogor
- Museum Batu Mulia and Artefak Neolithikum, Purbalingga
- Museum Batubara, Sawahlunto
- Museum Gunung Api Batur, Bali
- Museum Mandar Majene, Majene
- Museum Patiayam, Pati
- Museum Purbakala Sangiran, Sragen
- Museum Serangga dan Kupu-Kupu, Bogor
- Museum Sumatera Utara, Medan
- Museum Zoologi Bandung Zoo, Bandung
- Museum Zoologi Ragunan Zoo, Jakarta

=== Iran ===
- Hayk Mirzayans Insect Museum, Tehran
- Hamedan Museum of Natural History, Hamedan
- Museum of Natural History and Technology, Shiraz
- Natural History Museum, University of Zanjan, Zanjan
- Natural History Museum of Isfahan, Isfahan
- Iran Museum of Natural History and Wildlife, Tehran
- Natural History Museum, Ferdowsi University of Mashhad, Mashhad
- Natural History Museum, Institute of Botany and Plant Pests, Tehran
- Natural History Museum, Hakim Sabzevari University, Sabzevar
- Tabriz Museum of Natural History, Tabriz

=== Iraq ===
- Iraq Natural History Museum, Baghdad

=== Israel ===
- Geological Museum, Jerusalem
- Natural History Museum, Jerusalem
- The Steinhardt Museum of Natural History, Tel Aviv
- Bloomfield Science Museum, Jerusalem
- Biblical Museum of Natural History, Beit Shemesh

=== Japan ===
- Abiko City Museum of Birds, Abiko, Chiba Prefecture
- Ashoro Museum of Paleontology, Ashoro, Hokkaidō Prefecture
- Chūrui Naumann Elephant Museum, Makubetsu, Hokkaido Prefecture
- Fukui City Museum of Natural History (in Japanese), Fukui, Fukui Prefecture
- Fukui Prefectural Dinosaur Museum, Katsuyama, Fukui Prefecture
- Geological Museum, Tsukuba, Ibaraki Prefecture
- Gunma Museum of Natural History (in Japanese), Tomioka, Gunma Prefecture
- Hiroshima City Ebayama Museum of Meteorology, Hiroshima, Hiroshima Prefecture
- Ibaraki Nature Museum, Bandō, Ibaraki Prefecture
- Itami City Museum of Insects, Itami, Hyogo Prefecture
- Iwaki City Coal & Fossil Museum, Iwaki, Fukushima Prefecture
- Kanagawa Prefectural Museum of Natural History (in Japanese), Odawara, Kanagawa Prefecture
- Kannonzaki Nature Museum, Yokosuka, Kanagawa Prefecture
- Kitakyushu Museum of Natural History and Human History, Kitakyūshū, Fukuoka Prefecture
- Kuji Amber Museum, Kuji, Iwate Prefecture
- Kyushu University Museum, Kyushu University, Fukuoka, Fukuoka Prefecture
- Lake Nojiri Naumann Elephant Museum, Shinano, Nagano Prefecture
- Meguro Parasitological Museum, Meguro, Tokyo
- Museum of Natural History, Tohoku University, Sendai, Miyagi Prefecture
- Museum of Nature and Human Activities, Sanda, Hyōgo Prefecture
- National Hansen's Disease Museum, Higashimurayama, Tokyo
- National Museum of Nature and Science, Taitō, Tokyo
- Natural History Museum and Institute, Chiba, Chiba Prefecture
- Natural History Museum and Zoological Park, Toyohashi, Aichi prefecture
- Natural History Museum Kutchan, Kutchan, Hokkaidō
- Nawa Insect Museum, Gifu, Gifu Prefecture
- Okhotsk Sea Ice Museum of Hokkaidō, Monbetsu, Hokkaidō
- Osaka Museum of Natural History, Osaka, Osaka Prefecture
- Pearl Museum, Mikimoto Pearl Island, Toba, Mie Prefecture
- Saitama Museum of Natural History, Nagatoro, Saitama Prefecture
- Shibetsu Salmon Science Museum, Shibetsu, Hokkaidō
- Tropical Medicine Museum, Nagasaki University Institute of Tropical Medicine, Nagasaki, Nagasaki Prefecture
- Tsuyama Museum of Science Education, Tsuyama, Okayama Prefecture

=== Jordan ===
- Pella Museum, Amman

=== South Korea ===
- Bandi Land Insect Museum, Muju County
- Ewha Womans University Natural History Museum, Seoul
- Gyeoryongsan Natural History Museum
- Seodaemun Museum of Natural History, Seoul

=== Kyrgyzstan ===
- Geological Museum and Mineralogical Museum, Bishkek

=== Malaysia ===
- Muzium Negara, Kuala Lumpur
- Natural History Museum, Putrajaya

=== Mongolia ===
- Central Museum of Mongolian Dinosaurs, Ulaanbaatar
- Mongolian Natural History Museum, Ulaanbaatar

=== Oman ===
- Natural History Museum of Muscat, Muscat

=== Pakistan ===
- Pakistan Museum of Natural History

=== Palestine ===
- Palestine Museum of Natural History

=== Philippines ===
- National Museum of Natural History, Manila
- UPLB Museum of Natural History, University of the Philippines Los Baños

=== Qatar ===
- Qatar National Museum, Doha

=== Singapore ===
- Science Centre Singapore
- Lee Kong Chian Natural History Museum

=== Taiwan ===
- Insect Science Museum, Taipei
- National Museum of Natural Science, Taichung
- National Museum of Taiwan History, Tainan City
- National Taiwan Museum, Taipei City
- National Chiayi University Insect Museum, Chiayi City

=== Thailand ===
- Thailand National Science Museum, Pathum Thani
- Chulalongkorn University Museum of Natural History, Bangkok
- Chulalongkorn University's Geological Museum, Bangkok
- Chulalongkorn University's Traditional Medicine Museum, Bangkok
- Mahidol University's Mollusk Museum, Bangkok
- Mahidol University's Mosquito Museum, Bangkok
- Mahidol University's Bio-Geo Path, Bangkok
- Rattanakosin Natural History Museum, Kasetsart University, Bangkok
- Veterinarical Anatomy Museum, Kasetsart University, Bangkok
- Pathology Museum, Kasetsart University, Bangkok
- Kasetsart University's Ant Museum, Bangkok
- Kasetsart University's Zoological Museum, Bangkok
- Kasetsart University Museum of Fisheries (Natural History), Bangkok
- Kasetsart University's 60th Anniversary Museum and Park of Insects, Bangkok
- Lichen Museum, Ramkhamhaeng University, Bangkok
- Bangkok Butterfly and Insect Park, Bangkok
- Dusit Zoo Museum, Bangkok
- Soil Museum, Bangkok
- Geological Museum, Bangkok
- Horn and Antler Museum, Bangkok
- Biological Science Museum at Faculaty of Science, Chiang Mai University, Chiang Mai
- Chiang Mai University's Geological Museum, Chiang Mai
- Museum of World Insects and Natural Heritages, Chiang Mai
- Lignite Learning Centre Museum, Lampang
- King Mongkut Memeorail Park of Science and Technology, Prachuap Khiri Khan
- Natural History Park, Ratchaburi
- Phu Wiang Dinosaur Museum, Khon Kaen
- Sirindhorn Museum, Kalasin
- Thai Island and Sea Natural History Museum, Chonburi
- Thainosaur Museum, Bangkok
- Chonlatassanasathan Museum, Chonburi
- Phuket Seashell Museum, Phuket
- Bangkok Seashell Museum, Bangkok
- Princess Maha Chakri Sirindhorn Natural History Museum, Prince of Songkla University, Hat Yai
- Prince of Songkla University's Traditional Medicine Museum, Hat Yai
- Natural History Museum and Local Learning Networks, Prince of Songkla University, Pattani

=== Turkey ===
- Forestry Museum, also known as Watch Mansion, Bursa
- MTA Natural History Museum, Ankara

=== United Arab Emirates ===
- Sharjah Natural History Museum, Sharjah
- Natural History Museum Abu Dhabi, Abu Dhabi

=== Uzbekistan ===
- Tabiat muzeyi, Tashkent

=== Vietnam ===
- Vietnam National Museum of Nature, Vietnam Academy of Science and Technology, Hanoi

== Central America ==
=== Belize ===
- Chaa Creek Natural History Museum, San Ignacio

=== Costa Rica ===
- Museo de Ciencias Naturales La Salle(La Salle Natural Sciences Museum)
- El Museo de Insectos de la Universidad de Costa Rica (MIUCR) (The Museum of Insects at the University of Costa Rica)
- Museo de Zoologia – Escuela de Biologia, University of Costa Rica
- Museo Nacional de Costa Rica(National Museum of Costa Rica), San José

=== Dominican Republic ===
- Museo Nacional de Historia Natural Santo Domingo
- Amber Museum, Puerto Plata
- Amber World Museum, Santo Domingo

=== Grenada ===
- Museo de Ciencias

=== Guatemala ===
- Museo Nacional de Historia Natural "Jorge A. Ibarra"
- Museo de Historia Natural de la Universidad de San Carlos de Guatemala
- Museo de Paleontologia y Arqueologia Ing. Roberto Woolfolk Saravia, Estanzuela Zacapa

=== Honduras ===
- Butterfly and Insect Museum, La Ceiba

=== Nicaragua ===
- Museo Ciencias Naturales de la Universidad Centroamericana, Managua
- Museo de Ometepe, Rivas
- Museo del Departamento de Malacología UCA, Managua
- Museo entomológico, León
- Museo Gemológico de la Concha y el Caracol, Managua
- Museo Paleontológico "El Hato", Managua
- Museos de Geología UNAN, Managua
- Museum Ecológico de Trópico Seco, Diriamba
- National Museum, Managua
- Sitio Paleontológico El Bosque, Estelí

=== Panama ===
- Centro de Exhibiciones Marinas de Punta Culebra, Panama City
- Museo de Ciencias Naturales Panama, Panama City
- Museum of Biodiversity, Panama City
- Colección Zoológica Dr. Eustorgio Méndez, Panama City
- Museo de Vertebrados de la Universidad de Panamá, Panama City
- Museo de Invertebrados de la Universidad de Panamá, Panama City
- Museo de Malacología de la Universidad de Panamá, Panama City
- Círculo Herpetológico de Panamá, Panama City
- Herbario de la Universidad de Panamá, Panama City

== Europe ==
=== Albania ===
- Natural Science Museum, Tirana

=== Austria ===
- Bergbaumuseum Klagenfurt – Mining museum, mineralogy, palaeontology, Klagenfurt
- Burgenlandische Landesmuseum, Eisenstadt
- Haus der Natur, Salzburg
- inatura – Erlebnis Naturschau Dornbirn Province Vorarlberg (in German), Dornbirn
- Krahuletz-Museum Eggenburg Earth sciences and history (in German), Eggenburg
- Landesmuseum für Kärnten, Klagenfurt Regional museum for the province Carinthia (in German), Klagenfurt
- Landesmuseum Niederösterreichisches, St. Pölten Nature, history, culture, and art of Lower Austria (in German)
- Landschaftsmuseum im Schloss Trautenfels Natural and cultural history in upper Styria (German), Pürgg-Trautenfels
- Museum der Stadt Mödling Nature and history, Mödling
- Museum Schloss Lackenbach Man and nature, Lackenbach
- Nationalparkzentrum Bios Mallnitz, Mallnitz
- Oberösterreiches Landesmuseum – Biologiezentrum The natural history museum of Upper Austria, Linz
- Sternwarte Kremsmünster, Kremsmünster
- Styrassic Park An open air dinosaur park, Bad Gleichenberg
- Tyrolean State Museum, Innsbruck
- Universalmuseum Joanneum universal museum for natural and cultural history, Graz
- Vienna Museum of Natural History, Vienna
- Wienerwaldmuseum, Eichgraben

=== Belarus ===
- Museum of Boulders
- Museum of Nature, Belovezhskaya Pushcha Nature Reserve

=== Belgium ===
- Royal Belgian Institute of Natural Sciences, Brussels
- Royal Museum for Central Africa, Tervuren
- Aquarium-Museum of Liège
- Museum of Natural History and Vivarium, Tournai
- Regional Museum of Natural Sciences, Mons
- Gents Universiteitsmuseum, Ghent
- Museum of Zoology Auguste Lameere, Brussels
- Museum of Natural History Boekenberg, Antwerp
- Museum of Zoology of KU Leuven, Leuven
- Museum of the Iguanodon, Bernissart
- MuseOs, Koksijde

=== Bosnia and Herzegovina ===
- National Museum of Bosnia and Herzegovina, Sarajevo

=== Bulgaria ===
- Burgas Museum, Natural History Exposition, Burgas
- Earth and Man National Museum, Sofia
- Historical Museum – Karnobat, Karnobat
- History Museum – Panagyurishte, Panagyurishte
- Kardjali Museum, Kardjali
- Museum Collection of Natural Science "To Nature with Love", Byala Cherkva
- Museum of Speleology and Bulgarian Karst, Chepelare
- National Museum of Natural History, Bulgaria, Sofia
- Natural History Museum of Varna, Varna
- Natural History Museum of Ruse Ruse
- Natural History Museum of Cherni Osam Lovech
- Paleontological Museum, Asenovgrad
- Regional Historical Museum in Pleven, Pleven
- University of Mining & Geology Museum of Mineralogy, Petrography and Minerals, St. Ivan Rilski, Sofia

=== Canary Islands ===
(belongs politically to Spain)

- Museum of Nature and Archaeology (Museo de la Naturaleza y Arqueología), Tenerife

=== Croatia ===
- Croatian Natural History Museum, Zagreb (Hrvatski prirodoslovni muzej)
- Dubrovnik Natural History Museum, Dubrovnik
- Hunting Museum, Zagreb
- Karlovac Municipal Museum, Karlovac
- Museum of Evolution and Prehistoric Human Habitation, Krapina
- Museum of Slavonia, Osijek
- Mushroom Museum, Zagreb
- Natural History Museum, Rijeka
- Natural History Museum and Zoo, Split
- Ornithological Collection, Metković
- Senj City Museum, Senj
- Varazdin Municipal Museum: The Herzer Palace, Varaždin
- Zoological Museum of Baranja – Kopačevo, Baranja – Kopačevo

=== Czech Republic ===
- Moravian Museum, Brno
- National Museum (Prague), Prague
- Chlupáč's Museum of the History of Earth, Prague
- Městské muzeum Čáslav, Čáslav

=== Denmark ===
- Copenhagen Amber Museum, Copenhagen
- Natural History Museum of Denmark, Copenhagen
- Fossil and Mo-clay Museum, near Sejerslev (northern Mors Island)
- Fur Museum, Nederby (on Fur Island)
- GeoCenter Møns Klint, Borre (eastern Møn)
- Gram Natural History Museum, Gram
- Museum of Evolution at Knuthenborg Safaripark, Bandholm
- NaturBornholm, Aakirkeby
- Naturhistorisk Museum, Aarhus
- Naturama, Svendborg
- Stevns Klint Experience, Rødvig
- Wadden Sea Centre, Vester Vedsted (near Ribe)

=== Estonia ===
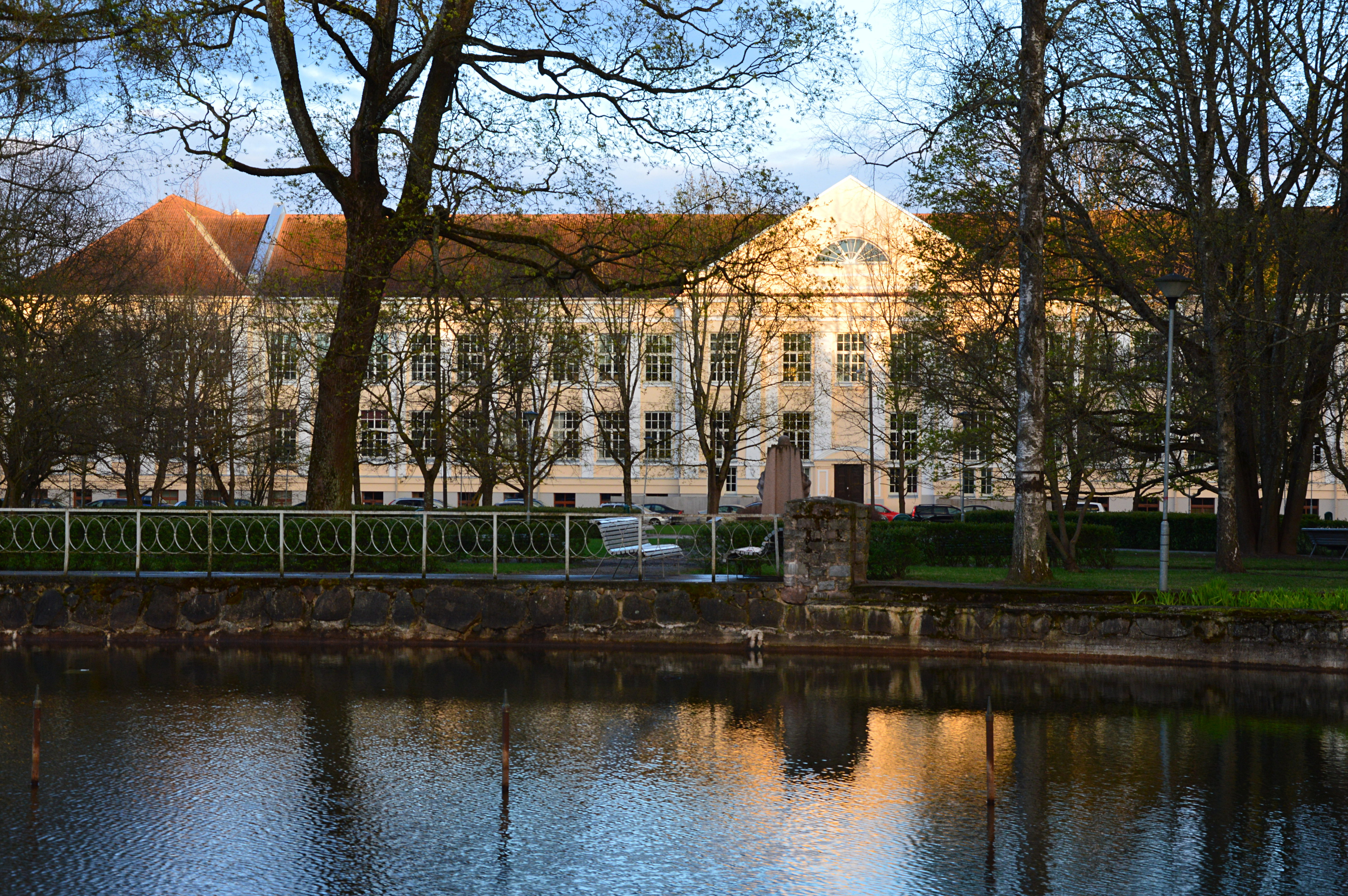
University of Tartu Natural History Museum

- Estonian Museum of Natural History, Tallinn
- Ice Age Centre, Tartu
- University of Tartu Natural History Museum, Tartu

=== Finland ===
- Finnish Museum of Natural History, Helsinki
- Geological Museum, University of Oulu, Oulu
- Mineralogical Museum of the Geological Survey of Finland, Espoo
- Tampere Mineral Museum, Tampere
- Natural History Museum of Tampere

=== France ===
- Aquarium Museum, Nancy
- Citadel of Besançon, Besançon
- Dinosauria, Espéraza
- Micropolis (La Cité des Insectes), Millau
- Musée des Beaux-Arts et d'Histoire Naturelle Châteaudun, Châteaudun
- Musée des Confluences, Lyon
- Musée d'Histoire Naturelle de Lille, Lille
- Musée de Vendôme, Vendôme
- Musée Géologique, Vernet-les-Bains
- Musée Requien, Avignon
- Musée zoologique de la ville de Strasbourg, Strasbourg
- Museum d'Histoire Naturelle Aix-en-Provence, Aix-en-Provence
- Muséum d'histoire naturelle d'Angers, Angers
- Muséum d'histoire naturelle de Marseille, Marseille
- Muséum d'Histoire Naturelle de Blois, Blois
- Muséum d'Histoire Naturelle de Bourges, Bourges
- Muséum d'histoire naturelle d'archéologie et d'ethnographie, Cherbourg-Octeville
- Muséum d'Histoire Naturelle de Grenoble, Grenoble
- Muséum d'Histoire Naturelle du Havre, Le Havre
- Natural History Museum of Nantes
- Muséum d'histoire naturelle de Nice
- Muséum d'Histoire Naturelle de Rouen, Rouen
- Muséum d'Histoire Naturelle de Toulouse, Toulouse
- Muséum d'Histoire Naturelle de Tours, Tours
- Muséum des Sciences Naturelles et de la Préhistoire de Chartres, Chartres
- Muséum des Sciences Naturelles d'Orléans, Orléans
- National Museum of Natural History, Paris

=== Georgia ===
- "Animal World" – Nature Museum, Tbilisi
- Georgian National Museum, Institute of Palaeobiology
- Museum of Georgian Geophysical Sciences History, Tbilisi

=== Germany ===
- Aquazoo-Löbbecke-Museum Düsseldorf
- Biozentrum Grindel und Zoologisches Museum, Hamburg
- Botanisches Museum, Berlin
- Bürgermeister-Müller-Museum, Solnhofen
- Deutsches Meeresmuseum, Stralsund
- Geologisches Museum München, Munich
- Haus der Natur, Cismar
- Hessisches Landesmuseum Darmstadt
- Jura Museum, Eichstätt
- Lower Saxony State Museum (German: Niedersächsisches Landesmuseum Hannover), Hanover
- Mineralogisches Museum, Philipps-University Marburg, Marburg
- Mineralogical Museum, Bonn
- Museum der Natur Gotha, Thuringia
- Müritzeum, Waren (Müritz)
- Museum der Natur Gotha, Gotha
- Museum für Natur und Umwelt, Lübeck
- Museum für Naturkunde Berlin, Berlin
- Museum für Naturkunde Chemnitz, Chemnitz
- Museum für Naturkunde Magdeburg, Magdeburg
- Museum Heineanum Halberstadt
- Museum Koenig, Bonn
- Museum of Man and Nature (German Museum Mensch und Natur), Munich
- Museum of Natural History in the Ottoneum, Official site in German, Kassel
- Museum Wiesbaden, Natural History Collections – MWNH, Wiesbaden
- Museum Witt, Munich
- Senckenberg Museum, Frankfurt
- Staatliches Naturhistorisches Museum, Braunschweig
- Naturhistorisches Museum, Mainz
- Naturkundemuseum Coburg, Coburg
- Naturkunde Museum, Bamberg
- Naturkundemuseum Erfurt, Thuringia
- Naturkundemuseum Leipzig, Leipzig
- Neanderthal Museum, Mettmann
- Paläontologisches Museum München, Munich
- Palatine Museum of Natural History (Pfalzmuseum für Naturkunde), Bad Dürkheim
- Phyletisches Museum, Jena
- Senckenberg Deutsches Entomologisches Institut, Müncheberg
- Senckenberg Museum für Naturkunde, Görlitz
- State Museum of Natural History Karlsruhe (German: Staatliches Museum für Naturkunde), Karlsruhe
- State Museum of Natural History Stuttgart (German: Staatliches Museum für Naturkunde), Stuttgart
- State Museum of Zoology (German: Senckenberg Naturhistorische Sammlungen), Dresden
- Südostbayerisches Naturkunde- und Mammut-Museum, Siegsdorf
- Übersee-Museum Bremen, Bremen
- Urwelt-Museum Hauff (Hauff Museum of the Prehistoric World), Holzmaden
- Westfälisches Museum für Naturkunde, Münster
- Zoological Museum of Kiel University, Kiel
- Zoologische Staatssammlung München, Munich

=== Greece ===
- Natural History Museum of Meteora and Mushroom Museum, Kalampaka, Trikala
- Cretan Aquarium, Heraklion
- Goulandris Natural History Museum, Athens
- Volos Natural History Museum, Volos
- Mineralogical Museum of Lavrion, Athens
- Museum of Mineralogy and Petrology, University of Athens
- Natural History Museum of Crete
- Natural History Museum of the Lesvos Petrified Forest, Lesvos
- Rhodes Aquarium, Rhodes
- Zoological Museum of the University of Athens
- Museum of Mineralogy & Paleontology Stamatiadis, Ialysos, Rhodes

=== Greenland ===
- Greenland National Museum and Archives, Nuuk

=== Hungary ===
- Danube Museum (Duna Múzeum), Esztergom
- Deri Museum, Official site in Hungarian, Debrecen
- Exhibition of Natural Science, Janus Pannonius Múzeum Természettudományi Osztálya, Pécs
- Geological Museum of Hungary, Budapest
- Hungarian Geographical Museum, Magyar Környezetvédelmi és Vízügyi Múzeum "Duna Múzeum", Esztergom
- Hungarian Natural History Museum, Budapest
- Jazygian Museum (Jász Múzeum), Jászberény
- Kazinczy Ferenc Múzeum, Sátoraljaújhely
- Komlo Natural Science Collection (Komlói Természettudományi Gyűjtemény), Komló
- Mátra Múzeum, Gyöngyös
- Mihály Munkácsy Museum, Békéscsaba
- Móra Ferenc Múzeum, Szeged
- Museum of Natural Sciences of Bakony (Bakonyi Természettudományi Múzeum), Zirc
- Ottó Herman Museum, Miskolc

=== Iceland ===
- Arctic Fox Centre, Súðavík
- Höfn Glacier Museum, Höfn
- Húsavík Whale Museum, Húsavík
- Icelandic Phallological Museum, Reykjavík
- Natural History Museum of Kópavogur, Kópavogur
- Volcano House, Reykjavík
- Whales of Iceland, Reykjavík

=== Ireland ===
- Natural History Museum, Dublin
- Trinity College Dublin Zoological Museum
- James Mitchell Geological Museum, National University of Ireland, Galway

=== Italy ===
- Museo Civico Scienze Naturali Enrico Caffi, Bergamo
- University Museums, University of Bologna, Bologna
- Museo della Preistoria Luigi Donini, San Lazzaro di Savena, Bologna
- Museo del Fossile del Monte Baldo, Brentonico, Trentino-Alto Adige/Südtirol
- Museo Civico di Storia Naturale, Carmagnola, Piedmont
- Museo Civico Comunale di Comiso, Sicily
- Museo Civico di Storia Naturale di Ferrara, Ferrara
- Museo di Storia Naturale di Firenze, University of Florence, Florence
- Museo Civico di Storia Naturale Giacomo Doria, Genoa
- Museo di Storia Naturale della Maremma, Grosseto
- Museo di Storia Naturale del Mediterraneo, Livorno
- Museo di Scienze Naturali, Lodi, Lombardy
- Museo Civico di Storia Naturale di Milano, Milan
- Zoological Museum of Naples, Naples
- Museo di Geologia e Paleontologia, University of Padua, Padua
- Museo per la Storia dell'Università, University of Pavia, Pavia
- Museo di Storia Naturale, University of Pavia, Pavia
- Museo di Archeologia, University of Pavia, Pavia
- Museo di Mineralogia, University of Pavia, Pavia
- Natural History Museum, Pisa
- Museo Geologico delle Dolomiti, Predazzo, Trentino-Alto Adige/Südtirol
- Museo Civico di Zoologia di Roma, Rome
- Geological Museum, Rome
- Museo Civico Rovereto, Rovereto
- Museo Regionale di Scienze Naturali, Saint-Pierre
- Museo di Storia Naturale, Sulmona
- Museo di Storia Naturale Bios Taras, Taranto
- Museo Tridentino di Scienze Naturali, Trento
- Museo Civico di Storia Naturale di Trieste, Trieste
- Turin Museum of Natural History, Turin
- Museo di Storia Naturale di Venezia, Venice
- Museo Civico di Storia Naturale, Verona

=== Latvia ===
- Latvian National Museum of Natural History

=== Liechtenstein ===
- Liechtenstein National Museum, Vaduz

=== Lithuania ===
- Palanga Amber Museum, Palanga
- Tadas Ivanauskas Zoological Museum, Kaunas

=== Luxembourg ===
- National Museum of Natural History Luxembourg, Luxembourg City

=== Macedonia ===
- Macedonian Museum of Natural History, Skopje

=== Malta ===
- National Museum of Natural History, Mdina

=== Moldova ===
- National Museum of Ethnography and Natural History, Chișinău

=== Monaco ===
- Oceanographic Museum, Monaco-Ville

=== Montenegro ===
- Natural History Museum of Montenegro, Podgorica

=== The Netherlands ===
- Naturalis (or National Museum of Natural History), Leiden
- Natuurmuseum Brabant, Tilburg
- Natuurhistorisch Museum Maastricht, Maastricht
- Natuurhistorisch Museum Rotterdam, Rotterdam
- Oertijdmuseum, Boxtel
- Teylers Museum, Haarlem
- Zoologisch Museum Amsterdam, Amsterdam
- Universiteitsmuseum Utrecht, Utrecht
- Universiteitsmuseum Groningen, Groningen
- Museon, The Hague
- Natuurhistorisch Museum Natura Docet, Denekamp
- Natuurhistorisch en Volkenkundig Museum Oudenbosch, Oudenbosch
- Gelders Geologisch Museum, Velp
- Natuurmuseum Nijmegen, Nijmegen
- Schelpenmuseum paal 14, Schiermonnikoog
- Ecomare, Texel
- Natuurmuseum Fyslan, Leeuwarden

=== Norway ===
- Agder Natural History Museum and Botanical Garden, Kristiansand
- Bergen Museum, Bergen
- Naturhistorisk museum, Universitetet i Oslo (Natural History Museum at the University of Oslo), Oslo
- NTNU University Museum, Trondheim
- Paleontologisk Museum, Universitetet i Oslo (Natural History Museum at the University of Oslo), Oslo
- Tromsø University Museum, Tromsø

=== Poland ===
- Museum of Evolution Warsaw, Warsaw
- Museum of Natural History, University of Wrocław, Wrocław
- Natural History Museum of the Białowieża National Park, Białowieża Forest
- Upper Silesian Museum (Muzeum Górnośląskie w Bytomiu), Bytom
- Museum of the Earth Warsaw, Warsaw
- Museum and Institute of Zoology of the Polish Academy of Sciences, Warsaw
- Muzeum Przyrodnicze Instytutu Systematyki i Ewolucji Zwierząt PAN, Kraków

=== Portugal ===
- Museu Oceanográfico "Prof. Luiz Saldanha" do Portinho da Arrábida, Azeitão
- Museu Botânico da Escola Superior Agrária de Beja, Beja
- Science Museum of the University of Coimbra, Coimbra
- Museu de História Natural do Funchal, Funchal, Madeira Island
- National Museum of Natural History and Science, Lisbon, Lisbon
- Museu Geológico – Laboratório Nacional de Energia e Geologia, Lisbon
- Museu Maynense – Lisbon Academy of Sciences, Lisbon
- Museu da Lourinhã, Lourinhã
- Museu Aquário Vasco da Gama, Oeiras
- Museu Carlos Machado, Ponta Delgada
- Museu de História Natural e da Ciência da Universidade do Porto, Porto
- Sintra Natural History Museum, Sintra
- Museu de Geologia "Fernando Real" da Universidade de Trás-os-Montes e Alto Douro, Vila Real

=== Romania ===
- Bucegi Natural Park Museum, Sinaia
- Colți Museum of Amber
- Constantin Gruescu Iron Aesthetic Mineralogy Museum, Ocna de Fier
- County Museum of Satu Mare (Szatmárnémeti Múzeum), Satu Mare
- Danube Delta Natural Sciences Museum, Tulcea
- Haaz Rezső Múzeum, Odorheiu Secuiesc
- Ion Borcea Museum Complex of Natural Sciences, Bacău
- Mihai Băcescu Waters Museum, Fălticeni
- Mineralogical Museum and Zoological Museum of the Babeș-Bolyai University, Cluj-Napoca
- Museum of Banat, Natural Sciences Department, Timișoara
- Museum of Brăila, Department of Natural Sciences, also, Brăila
- Museum of Gold, Brad
- Museum of Natural Science (Muzeul de Științe Naturale), Aiud
- Museum of Oltenia, Craiova
- Muzeul Banatului (Banat Museum), Timișoara
- Muzeul de Istorie Naturală – Iași, Iași
- Muzeul de Științe ale Naturii Piatra Neamț; see also Iași, Romania Museums, Iași
- Muzeul de Științele Naturii Roman, Roman
- Muzeul Național de Istorie Naturală Grigore Antipa (Grigore Antipa Natural History Museum), Bucharest
- Muzeul Țării Crișurilor, Oradea
- Muzeul Tarisznyás Márton, English description, Gheorgheni
- National Geology Museum, Bucharest
- Natural History Museum Sibiu, Sibiu
- Natural Sciences and Hunting Museum, Vatra Dornei
- Natural Sciences Museum Dorohoi
- Natural Sciences Museum Complex, Constanța
- Natural Sciences Museum Complex Galați, Galați
- Paleontological and Stratighraphical Museum of the Babeș-Bolyai University, Cluj-Napoca
- Prahova County Natural Sciences Museum, Ploiești
- Sediul Muzeului de Științele Naturii (Mureș County Museum, Natural History Department), Târgu Mureș
- Székely National Museum (Székely Nemzeti Múzeum), Sfântu Gheorghe
- Szekler Museum of Ciuc (Csíky Székely Múzeum), Miercurea-Ciuc
- Vrancea Museum, Natural Sciences Department, Focșani

=== Russia ===
- Earth History Museum, Vernadsky State Geological Museum, Moscow
- Fersman Mineralogical Museum, Moscow
- Zoological Museum of Moscow University
- Geological Museum, Siberian Branch of the Russian Academy of Sciences, Novosibirsk
- Siberian Zoological Museum
- Kotelnich Palaeontological Museum, Kirov Oblast
- Kunstkamera, Saint Petersburg
- Orlov Museum, also Paleontological Institute of Russian Academy of Sciences, Moscow
- State Darwin Museum, Moscow
- Zoological Museum of the Russian Academy of Science, Saint Petersburg
- St. Petersburg University Museum of the Department of Invertebrate Zoology
- Paleontological Museum of Saint Petersburg State University, Saint Petersburg
- Mineralogical Museum of Saint Petersburg State University, Saint Petersburg
- Petrographical Museum of Saint Petersburg State University, Saint Petersburg

=== Serbia ===
- Museum of Natural History (Prirodnjački muzej), Belgrade
- Museum of Vojvodina, Novi Sad
- Museum of Natural History, Novi Sad

=== Slovenia ===
- Natural History Museum of Slovenia (Prirodoslovni muzej Slovenije), Ljubljana

=== Slovakia ===
- East Slovakia Museum, Košice
- Slovak National Museum, Bratislava

=== Spain ===
- Cau del Cargol Conquilles del Món (Shells of the World Museum, malacology), Catalonia
- Institut Paleontològic Dr. M. Crusafont, Sabadell
- Museo de Ciencias de Arnedo (Museum of Science Arnedo), Arnedo
- Museo de Ciencias Naturales, Álava
- Museu de Ciències Naturals, Barcelona
- Museo de Ciencias Naturales (Guadalcazar) and Mocha Tower, Córdoba
- Museo Geominero, Madrid
- Museo Municipal de Ciencias Naturales (Municipal Museum of Natural Science), Valencia
- Museo Nacional de Ciencias Naturales, Madrid
- Museo Paleontologico de la Universidad de Zaragoza, Zaragoza
- Museu de Ciencies Naturals de Costix, Mallorca
- Museu de Granollers Ciències Naturals, Granollers
- Museu de les Papallones de Catalunya, Lleida
- Museu Geològic del Seminari de Barcelona, Barcelona
- Museu Montsia, Amposta
- Museu Valencià d'Història Natural – Fundación Entomológica Torres Sala, Valencia
- Museum of Zoology, University of Navarra, Pamplona

=== Sweden ===
- Biologiska Museet (Biological Museum), Djurgården, Stockholm
- Gotland Museum (Gotlands museum), Visby
- Geological Museum Villa Heidelberg, Klimpfjäll
- Göteborg Natural History Museum (Göteborgs Naturhistoriska Museum), Gothenburg
- Malmö Museums – Natural History Museum, Malmö
- Lund University Zoology Museum (Lunds Universitet Zoologiska museet), Lund
- Museum of Evolution, Uppsala University (Evolutions Museet Uppsala Universitet), Uppsala
- Swedish Museum of Natural History (Naturhistoriska riksmuseet), Stockholm
- Swedish Amber Museum, Höllviken

=== Switzerland ===
- Musée cantonal de géologie (Cantonal Museum of Geology), Lausanne
- Musée cantonal de zoologie (Cantonal Museum of Zoology), Lausanne
- Musée d'histoire naturelle de Fribourg (Natural History Museum of Fribourg), Fribourg
- Museo Cantonale di Storia Naturale, Lugano
- Museo dei fossili di Meride / Museo dei fossili del Monte San Giorgio, Meride
- Muséum d'histoire naturelle de Genève (Natural History Museum of Geneva), Geneva
- Naturhistorisches Museum Basel (Natural History Museum Basel)
- Naturhistorisches Museum der Bürgergemeinde Bern (Natural History Museum of Bern), Bern
- Natur-Museum Luzern, Lucerne
- Naturhistorisches Museum der Universität Zürich (Natural History Museum of the University of Zurich), Zurich
- Sauriermuseum Aathal (Aathal Dinosaur Museum), Aathal

=== Turkey ===
- Istanbul Zoology Museum

=== Ukraine ===
- National Museum of Natural History at the National Academy of Sciences of Ukraine, Kyiv
- State Museum of Natural History, former Didushytskyi museum, Lviv
- Zoological Museum of Kyiv University, Kyiv
- Zoological Museum of Kharkiv University, Kharkiv
- Zoological Museum of Lviv University, Lviv
- Zoological Museum of Luhansk University, Luhansk
- Zoological Museum of Taurida University, Simferopol
- Scientific Museum of Nikitsky Botanical Garden, Yalta
- Odesa Archaeological Museum

=== United Kingdom ===
==== England ====
- Bagshaw Museum, Batley
- Booth Museum of Natural History, Brighton
- Bournemouth Natural Science Society
- Bristol City Museum and Art Gallery, Bristol
- Buxton Museum & Art Gallery, Buxton
- Camborne School of Mines Mineral Museum, Tremough, Cornwall
- Cambridge University Museum of Zoology, Cambridge
- Charnwood Museum, Loughborough, Leicestershire
- Chelmsford Museum, Chelmsford
- Cole Museum of Zoology, Reading
- Crab Museum, Margate
- Dinosaur Isle, Isle of Wight
- Dorman Museum, Linthorpe
- Grant Museum of Zoology, London
- Hancock Museum, Newcastle upon Tyne
- Haslemere Educational Museum, Haslemere, Surrey
- Horniman Museum, London
- Ipswich Museum, Ipswich
- Kendal Museum, Kendal
- Lapworth Museum of Geology, University of Birmingham, Edgbaston
- Manchester Museum, Manchester
- Museum of Lancashire, Lancashire
- Natural History Museum, London
- Natural History Museum at Tring, Tring
- Norwich Castle, Norwich
- Oxford University Museum of Natural History, Oxford
- Potteries Museum & Art Gallery, Stoke-on-Trent
- Powell-Cotton Museum, Quex Park, Birchington, Kent
- Rotunda Museum, Scarborough
- Royal Cornwall Museum, Truro
- Sedgwick Museum of Earth Sciences, University of Cambridge, Cambridge
- Tolson Museum, Huddersfield
- University of Bristol Geology Museum, University of Bristol, Bristol
- Weston Park Museum, Sheffield
- Wollaton Hall Natural History Museum, Nottingham
- World Museum Liverpool, Liverpool
- Yorkshire Museum, York
- Yorkshire Natural History Museum, Sheffield

==== Scotland ====
- Bell Pettigrew Museum, University of St Andrews, St Andrews
- Creetown Gem Rock Museum, Creetown, Galloway
- D'Arcy Thompson Zoology Museum, University of Dundee, Dundee
- Elgin Museum, Elgin, Moray
- Hunterian Museum and Art Gallery, Glasgow
- National Museums of Scotland, Royal Museum, Edinburgh
- Kelvingrove Art Gallery and Museum, Glasgow
- University of Aberdeen Zoology Museum, Aberdeen

==== Wales ====
- National Museum Cardiff
- Falconry Heritage Trust, Carmarthen

==== Northern Ireland ====
- Ulster Museum, Belfast

== North America ==
=== Bermuda ===
- Bermuda Underwater Exploration Institute, Hamilton

=== Canada ===
==== Alberta ====
- Banff Park Museum, Banff
- Devil's Coulee Dinosaur Heritage Museum, Warner
- Glenbow Museum, Calgary
- Philip J. Currie Dinosaur Museum, Wembley
- Royal Tyrrell Museum of Palaeontology, Drumheller
- Royal Alberta Museum, Edmonton
- Torrington Gopher Hole Museum, Torrington
- University of Alberta Museums, Edmonton
- University of Calgary Zoology Museum, Calgary

==== British Columbia ====
- Alpine Taxidermy & Wildlife Museum, Grand Forks
- Beaty Biodiversity Museum, University of British Columbia, Vancouver
- Canadian Wildlife Museum, Vernon
- Museum of Natural History, Vancouver Island University, Nanaimo
- Nk'Mip Desert Cultural Centre, Osoyoos
- Pacific Museum of the Earth, University of British Columbia, Vancouver
- Royal British Columbia Museum, Victoria

==== Manitoba ====
- B.J. Hales Museum of Natural History, Brandon University, Brandon (closed)
- Canadian Fossil Discovery Centre, Morden
- Ed Leith Cretaceous Menagerie, University of Manitoba, Winnipeg
- Irvin Goodon International Wildlife Museum, Boissevain
- Manitoba Museum, Winnipeg
- Robert B. Ferguson Museum of Mineralogy, University of Manitoba, Winnipeg
- Sam Waller Museum, The Pas
- Whiteshell Natural History Museum, Whiteshell Provincial Park, Nutimik Lake

==== New Brunswick ====
- Atlantic Salmon Museum, Doaktown
- Cape Jourimain Nature Centre, Cape Jourimain
- Grand Manan Museum, Grand Manan
- Gaskin Museum of Marine Life,
- Miramichi History Museum, Miramichi
- Miramichi Salmon Conservation Centre,
- New Brunswick Museum, Saint John
- Sunbury Shores Arts & Nature Centre, Saint Andrews Parish

==== Newfoundland ====
- Newfoundland Insectarium, Reidville
- Johnson Geo Centre, St. John's
- Suncor Energy Fluvarium, St. John's
- The Rooms, St. John's

Northwest Territories

- Nature's North Wildlife Gallery, Yellowknife
- Prince of Wales Northern Heritage Centre, Yellowknife

==== Nova Scotia ====
- A.D. Pickett Entomology Museum, Dalhousie University Faculty of Agriculture, Truro
- Fundy Geological Museum, Parrsboro
- Nova Scotia Museum of Natural History, Halifax
- Sea Turtle Centre, Halifax
- Thomas McCulloch Museum, Dalhousie University, Halifax

==== Ontario ====
- 1000 Islands History Museum, Gananoque
- Aquatarium, Brockville
- Arkona Lions Museum, Arkona
- Ball's Falls Centre for Conservation, Ball's Falls, Ontario
- Bancroft Gem and Mineral Museum, Bancroft
- Bonnechere Museum, Bonnechere
- Canadian Museum of Nature, Ottawa
- Dynamic Earth, Sudbury
- Entomica Insectarium, Sault Ste. Marie
- Royal Ontario Museum, Toronto
- The Earth Sciences Museum, University of Waterloo, Waterloo
- The Miller Museum of Geology, Queen's University at Kingston
- Museum of Northern History, Kirkland Lake
- The Niagara Falls Museum, Niagara Falls
- Pelee Island Heritage Centre, Pelee
- Science North, Greater Sudbury
- Stones 'N Bones Museum, Sarnia

==== Quebec ====
- Lake Timiskaming Fossil Centre, Quebec City
- Montreal Biosphere, Montreal
- Montreal Insectarium, Montreal
- Musée de la Nature et des Sciences, Sherbrooke
- Musee du Fjord, La Baie
- Musée de Paléontologie et de l'Evolution, Montreal
- Musée Minéralogique d'Asbestos, Asbestos
- Musée minèralogique et minier de Thetford Mines, Thetford Mines
- Redpath Museum, Montreal
- Sherbrooke Nature and Science Museum, Sherbrooke

==== Saskatchewan ====
- Abernethy Nature-Heritage Museum, Abernethy
- Ancient Echoes Interpretive Center, Herschel
- Museum of Natural Sciences, University of Saskatchewan, Saskatoon
- Royal Saskatchewan Museum, Regina
- T.rex Discovery Centre, Eastend

==== Yukon ====
- Kluane Museum of Natural History, Burwash Landing
- Yukon Beringia Interpretive Centre, Whitehorse

=== Mexico ===
- Caracol, Museo de Ciencias de Ensenada, Ensenada
- Museo de Geología UNAM, Mexico City
- Museo de Historia Natural de Cabo San Lucas, Cabo San Lucas
- Museo de Historia Natural de la Ciudad de México, Mexico City
- Museo de las Aves de México, Coahuila
- Museo de Paleontología de Delicias, Chihuahua
- Museo de Paleontología de Guadalajara, Guadalajara
- Museo de Paleontología- UNAM, Mexico City
- Museo del Desierto, Coahuila
- Museo Nacional de Antropologia, Mexico City
- Tamux – Museo de Historia Natural de Tamaulipas, Tamaulipas
- Museo Paleontológico en Tocuila, Texcoco

== Oceania ==
=== Australia ===
- Age of Fishes Museum, Canowindra, New South Wales
- Australian Museum, Sydney
- Australian Fossil and Mineral Museum, Bathurst, New South Wales
- Biological Sciences Museum at Macquarie University, North Ryde, New South Wales
- Broken Hill Geo Centre, Broken Hill, New South Wales
- Butterfly Farm, Wilberforce, New South Wales
- The Crystal Caves, North Queensland
- Crystal Kingdom, Coonabarabran, New South Wales
- Earth Sciences Museum, Macquarie University, North Ryde, New South Wales
- Emmaville Mining Museum, Emmaville, New South Wales
- Eumundi Museum, Eumundi, Queensland
- Kronosaurus Korner, Richmond, Queensland
- Macleay Museum – Sydney University, Sydney
- Mining and Minerals Education Centre, Tasmanian Minerals Council, Hobart, Tasmania
- Museums and Art Galleries of the Northern Territory, Darwin
- Museum of Central Australia, Alice Springs, Northern Territory
- Museum of Tropical Queensland, Townsville
- Museum Victoria, Melbourne Museum, Melbourne
- National Dinosaur Museum, Nicholls, Australian Capital Territory
- Queensland Museum, Brisbane
- Queen Victoria Museum and Art Gallery, Launceston, Tasmania
- South Australian Museum, Adelaide
- Tate Museum, a geological museum at the University of Adelaide, Adelaide, South Australia
- Tasmanian Museum and Art Gallery, Hobart, Tasmania
- Western Australian Museum, Perth
- Western Australian Museum, Albany, Albany
- Western Australian Museum Geraldton, Geraldton
- Western Australian Museum, Kalgoorlie-Boulder, Kalgoorlie-Boulder

=== New Zealand ===
- Auckland War Memorial Museum, Auckland
- Canterbury Museum, Christchurch
- Museum of New Zealand Te Papa Tongarewa, Wellington
- Otago Museum, Dunedin
- Southland museum and art gallery, Invercargill
- Te Manawa: Museum, Gallery, Science Centre, Palmerston North

=== Papua New Guinea ===
- National Agricultural Insect Collection, Port Moresby

== South America ==
=== Argentina ===
- Carlos Ameghino Provincial Museum
- Dr. Ángel Gallardo Provincial Natural Sciences Museum, Rosario
- Ernesto Bachmann Paleontological Museum
- Francisco Moreno Museum of Patagonia
- Glaciarium (museum)
- Instituto y Museo de Ciencias Naturales, San Juan
- Museo Argentino de Ciencias Naturales "Bernardino Rivadavia", Buenos Aires
- Museo Municipal de Ciencias Naturales "Lorenzo Scaglia" Mar del Plata
- Museo Carmen Funes, Plaza Huincul
- Museo de Ciencias Naturales Augusto G. Schulz" de Resistencia (Museum of Natural Sciences), Chaco Province
- Museo de Ciencias Naturales Carlos Darwin (Carlos Darwin Museum of Natural Sciences), Buenos Aires
- Museo de Ciencias Naturales de Coronel Pringles, Buenos Aires
- Museo de Ciencias Naturales y Antropológicas "Juan Cornelio Moyano", Mendoza
- Museo de Geología Mineralogía y Palentología, Jujuy
- Museo de Geología y Paleontología, Neuquen
- Museo de Historia Natural "Francisco Javier Muñiz" de Moreno, Moreno Partido
- Museo de La Plata, Buenos Aires
- Museo de Mineralogia y Geologia Dr. A. Stelzner
- Museo de Paleontologia, Universidad Nacional de Córdoba, Córdoba
- Museo del Lago Gutierrez "Dr. Rosendo Pascual", Río Negro Province
- Museo del Mar, Mar del Plata
- Museo Gallardo, San Lorenzo
- Museo Histórico y de Ciencias Naturales "Pago de los Lobos", Lobos
- Museo Mariposa del Mundo, Butterflies of the World Museum, San Miguel
- Museo Municipal de Ciencias Naturales de Monte Hermoso, Monte Hermoso
- Museo Municipal de Historia Natural de Gral. Alvear/Gen. Alvear Municipal Museum of Natural History, General Alvear
- Museo Municipal "Punta Hermengo" de Miramar, Buenos Aires
- Museum of Paleontology Egidio Feruglio
- Museo Paleontológico y Petrolero Astra, Astra Museum of Paleontology and Oil, Chubut
- Museo Provincial de Ciencias Naturales (Provincial Museum of Natural Sciences) "Florentino Ameghino", Santa Fe
- Museo Provincial de Ciencias Naturales Puerto Madryn (Provincial Museum of Natural Sciences of Chubut)
- Museo Provincial de Historia Natural de La Pampa, La Pampa Province
- Museo Regional de Ciencias Naturales "Prof. Rodolfo Parodi Bustos", Salta Province
- Museo Regional Municipal de El Calafate/El Calafate Municipal Regional Museum, Santa Cruz Province
- Museum of Natural Sciences "Augusto G. Schulz", Chaco Province
- Museum of Paleontology "Egidio Feruglio" (MEF)
- Museum of Patagonia, Río Negro Province
- Paleorama, Museo Itinerante, Buenos Aires
- Museo Miguel Lillo de Ciencias Naturales, Tucuman Province
- Samay Huasi

=== Bolivia ===
- Museo de Anatomía de la Universidad de San Francisco Xavier
- Museo de Historia Natural, La Paz
- Museo de History Natural Noel Kempff Mercado, Santa Cruz
- Museo de Historia Natural Alcide d'Orbigny, Cochabamba

=== Brazil ===
- Museu de Arqueologia e Etnologia – USP, São Paulo, SP
- Museu de Ciências Naturais – PUC MINAS, Belo Horizonte, MG
- Museu Entomológico Fritz Plaumann, Santa Catarina
- Museu Geológico Valdemar Lefèvre, São Paulo, SP
- Museu de Geociências – USP, São Paulo, SP
- Museu de História Natural de Taubaté, Taubaté
- Museu de Historia Natural Capão da Imbuia Wood, Curitiba
- Museu Nacional, UFRJ, Rio de Janeiro, RJ
- Museu Paraense Emílio Goeldi, Belém
- Museu de Rochas, Minerais e Minérios – USP, São Paulo, SP
- Museum of Veterinary Anatomy FMVZ USP, São Paulo
- Museu de Zoologia da Universidade Estadual de Campinas, Campinas, São Paulo state
- Museu de Zoologia da Universidade de São Paulo, São Paulo

=== Chile ===
- Chilean National Museum of Natural History, Santiago
- Museo de Historia Natural de Valparaiso, Región de Valparaiso
- Museo de Historia Natural de Concepción, Región del Biobío

=== Colombia ===
- Museo de Historia Natural, Popayán
- Museo La Salle, Bogotá
- Museo Prehistórico
- National University of Colombia, Bogotá:
  - Museo de Historia Natural (Museum of Natural History)
  - Museo Entomológico (Museum of Entomology)
  - Museo Paleontológico (Museum of Paleontology)
- Botanic Garden Medellín

=== Ecuador ===
- Gustavo Orcés V. Natural History Museum, Quito

=== Guyana ===
- Guyana National Museum, Georgetown

=== Paraguay ===
- Botanical Garden and Zoo of Asunción, Asunción

=== Peru ===
- Museum of Natural History, Lima (Museo de Historia Natural), National University of San Marcos, Lima
- Museo La Salle, Lima

=== Trinidad and Tobago ===
- The University of the West Indies Zoology Museum, Saint Augustine, Trinidad and Tobago

=== Uruguay ===
- Museo del Mar, La Barra del Maldonado
- National Museum of Natural History, Montevideo

=== Venezuela ===
- Museo de Biología de la Universidad Central de Venezuela (MBUCV), Caracas
- Museo de Ciencias Naturales, Caracas
- Museo de Ciencias Naturales de Guanare
- Museo de Historia Natural La Salle, Caracas
- Museo de la Estación Biológica de Rancho Grande
- Museo del Instituto de Zoología Agrícola 'Francisco Fernández, Aragua
- Museo Marino, Boca de Río
- Museo Oceanologico Hermano Benigno Roman de la Fundación La Salle, Punta de Piedras, Isla Margarita
- Museo Paleontológico de Urumaco, Urumaco
- Museum Entomológico, Colección de Insectos de Interés Agrícola y su combate Insect Collection Interest Agricultural
- William Phelps Ornithological Collection, Caracas

== See also ==
- Lists of museums
