= Geological Museum (disambiguation) =

The Geological Museum is a component of the Natural History Museum in London, established in 1835.

Geological Museum, Geology Museum, or Museum of Geology may also refer to:

== General ==
- Any natural history museum that focuses on geology

== Specific museums ==
=== Africa ===
- Egyptian Geological Museum, Cairo

=== Asia ===
- Geological Museum and Art Gallery (Dilijan), Armenia
- Geological Museum of China, Beijing
- Stephen Hui Geological Museum, Hong Kong
- Bandung Geological Museum, Indonesia
- Geological Museum (Japan), Tsukuba
- Geological Museum (Malaysia), Ipoh
- Hunan Museum of Geology, China
- Museum of Geology, Tashkent, Uzbekistan
- Azerbaijan Museum of Geology, Baku

=== Australia ===
- The original name of the Western Australian Museum, Perth

=== Europe ===
- Geological Museum after H. Karapetyan, Yerevan, Albania
- University of Copenhagen Geological Museum, Denmark
- Geological Museum of Budapest, Hungary
- James Mitchell Geology Museum, Galway, Ireland
- Geological Museum of the Dolomites, Predazzo, Italy
- Geological Museum of the State Geological Institute, Warsaw, Poland
- National Geological Museum (Romania), Bucharest
- Vernadsky State Geological Museum, Moscow, Russia
- Geological Museum of the Barcelona Seminary, Spain
- Lapworth Museum of Geology, Birmingham, England

=== North America ===
- Fundy Geological Museum, Parrsboro, Nova Scotia, Canada
- Greene Geological Museum, Milwaukee, Wisconsin, U.S.
- Karl Limper Geology Museum, Oxford, Ohio, U.S.
- UW–Madison Geology Museum, Madison, Wisconsin, U.S.

== See also ==
- List of natural history museums
- Category:Geology museums
