= Horuru =

Horuru may refers to:

- Horuru language, a dialect of Yalahatan language spoken in Indonesia. ISO 639-3 code hrr (depreacted)
- Horuru (Doraemon)
- Horuru, a nickname of Iwaki City Coal & Fossil Museum in Iwaki, Fukushima, Japan
