= Bengal Natural History Museum =

- Location within West Bengal
- Established: 1903; 123 years ago
- Location: Darjeeling, West Bengal
- Coordinates: 27.0577428°N 88.252466°E
- Type: Natural history museum
- Director: Mr. Arun Kumar Mukhopadhaya
- Website: https://darjeelingzoo.in/?tab=bnhm

The Bengal Natural History Museum is a museum in Darjeeling, West Bengal, that exhibits a vast range of natural artifacts and fossils. The museum is home to specimens of over 400 species of birds, 110 species of eggs, 35 species of snakes and 57 species of fish.

== History ==
The Bengal Natural History Museum was established in 1903 as a small museum in the premises of the Lloyd Botanical Garden under the orders of the then Governor-General of India, Mr. George Nathaniel Curzon. At the time, setting up the museum cost INR 14,000. Due to increasing visitors and growing collections, the museum was shifted to a different location in 1915. Towards the end of 1923, the Bengal Natural History Society (then called Darjeeling Natural History Society) was formally formed to manage the museum and its activities. From June 1926, the society also started publishing a journal which ran till 1970.

From 1923 to 1948, Charles M. Inglis served as the curator of the museum. He also served as the editor of the Journal of Bengal Natural History Society for many years. Naturalists, foresters, tea planters were members of the society. This included E.O. Shebbeare, conservator of forests of Bengal. In 1976, the museum was handed over to West Bengal Forest Department. Under the new management, a new run of the journal ran from 1982 to 1991.

In 2007, then governor of West Bengal Gopalkrishna Gandhi suggested the museum be moved into the premises of Padmaja Naidu Himalayan Zoological Park, Darjeeling. Construction of this new building started in 2010 and in 2015, the museum was shifted. The new museum opened for visitors on 23rd July, 2016.

== Collections ==
=== Birds ===
The collection of birds numbers around 697 species out of a listed 713 for the area; those not represented are exceedingly rare or local. The collection of bird’s eggs (110 species) is also large and that of bird’s nests is small but an attractive one. 229 stuffed specimens are on display now at the museum.

=== Mammals ===
Out of 80-90 mammal species found in the area 67 are displayed and are well represented, including many from other parts of India. Prized collection is the rare cats. Unique mammals of the Himalayas like the Red Panda, Asian Golden Cat, Marbled Cat, Clouded Leopard etc. can be seen here.

=== Reptiles and Fishes ===
Mostly wet specimens, the museum has 35 species of snakes and 57 types of fishes.

=== Insects ===
There are many insects housed at the museum, with over 600 butterfly and moth specimens and over 1000 of other insects like dragonflies, beetles, etc. A fraction of them are on display for visitors.

=== Reserved Collections ===
The museum preserves 2922 bird skins, 47 rolled mammal skins, and 52 flat mammal skins which are not on display. These are kept for the purpose of studying the animals.

== See also ==
- Natural history museum
- List of natural history museums
- List of museums in West Bengal
