= A Blank in the Weather Map =

1975 book by Kunio Yanagida

- First edition
- Author: Kunio Yanagida
- Original title: 空白の天気図
- Translator: A Blank in the Weather Map
- Language: Japanese
- Genre: Non-fiction
- Published: 1975 (Shinchosha, JP)
- Publication place: Japan
- Media type: Print (Paperback), e-book
- Pages: 273 pp (JP),(443 pp)
- ISBN: 978-4-10-322301-6

A Blank in the Weather Map (空白の天気図, Kuhaku-no Tenki-zu) is a non-fiction book written by Japanese author Kunio Yanagida and published in Japan in 1975. The book is about the Hiroshima Meteorological Observatory in 1945. Hiroshima was fully destroyed in the Atomic Bombing on August 6, 1945.

One month later, the phenomenal and powerful typhoon called Makurazaki Typhoon hit Hiroshima and resulted in 1,229 dead, 1,054 injured, and 783 missing in Hiroshima Prefecture. This book investigated what really happened there, why the Meteorological Observatory was ineffective. At that time, Hiroshima's administration systems were destroyed and was unable to inform the public about the typhoon. The survivors lost their houses from the bomb and were living in barracks or hospitals.

== Contents ==
- Introduction – Enigma of the 2,000 deaths
- Chapter 1 – The Flash
- Chapter 2 – No Lack of the Observation
- Chapter 3 – The 17th of September, 1945
- Chapter 4 – The Disaster of the Research Group on Atomic Bomb from Kyoto University
- Chapter 5 – The Black Rain
- Last chapter – The Record of the Sandglass

== See also ==
- Hiroshima Meteorological Observatory
- Atomic Bombing of Hiroshima – August 6, 1945
- Makurazaki Typhoon – September 17, 1945
  - one of the three largest Typhoons in Shōwa period
  - 1229 dead, 1054 injured, 783 missing in Hiroshima Prefecture
