= Francisco Moreno Museum of Patagonia =

Coordinates: 41°08′00″S 71°18′35″W

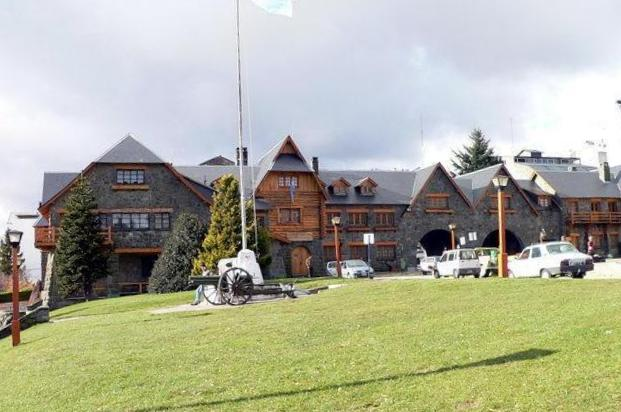
The Francisco P. Moreno Museum of Patagonia, Bariloche

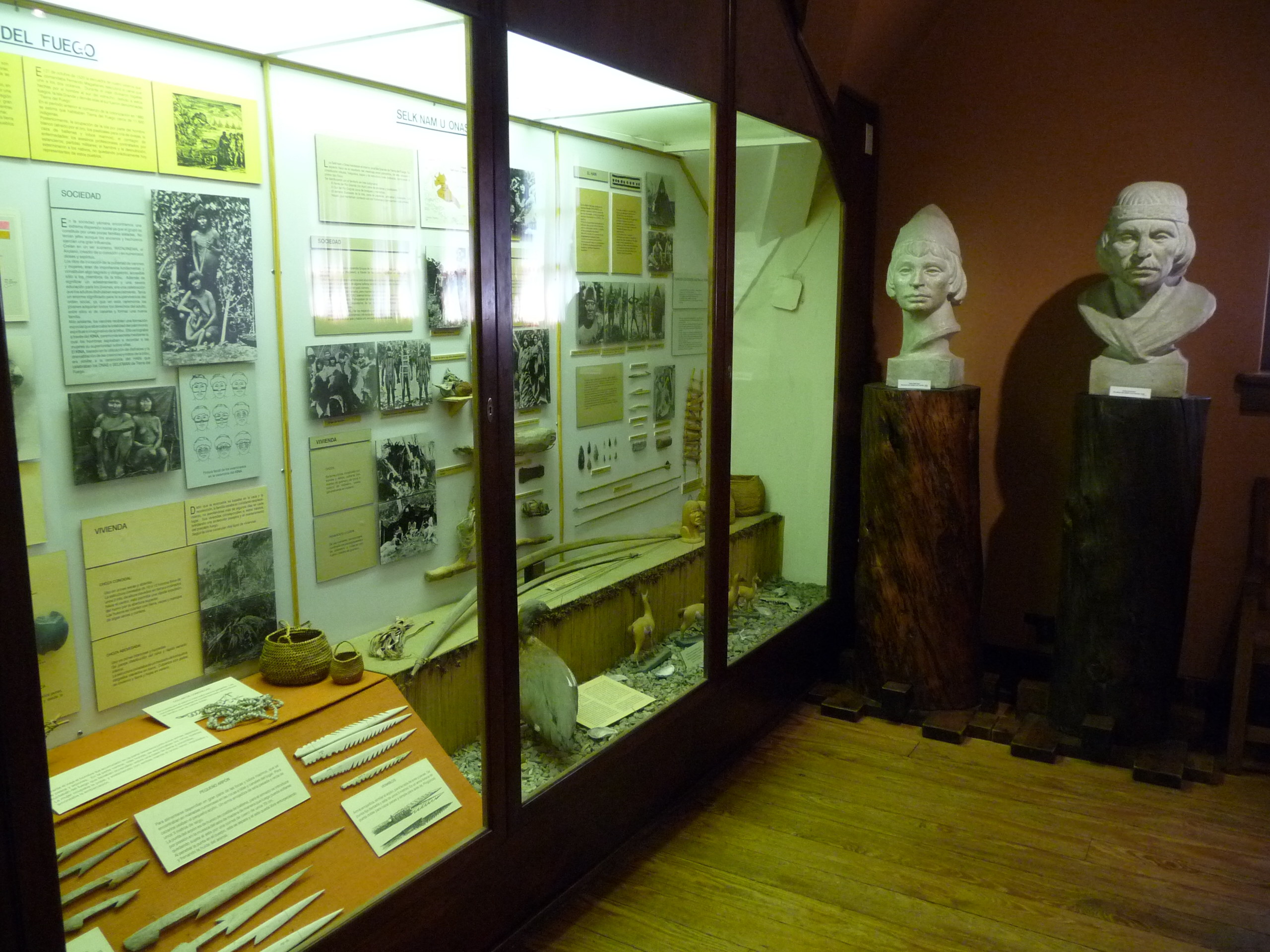
One of the rooms in the museum

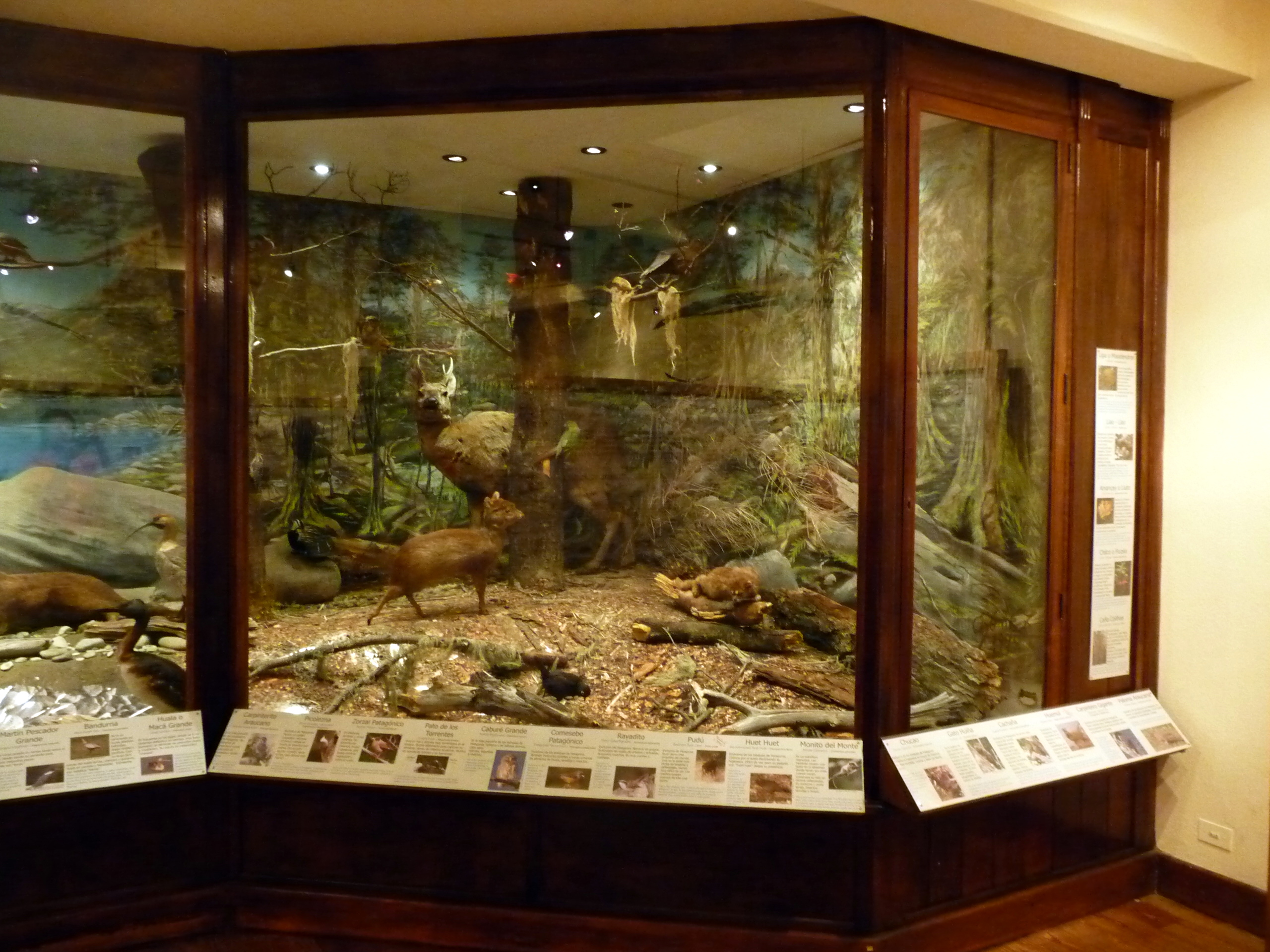
Patagonic fauna exhibit

The Francisco P. Moreno Museum of Patagonia is a natural history and cultural anthropology museum located in the Civic Center of Bariloche, Argentina.

== History ==
The museum was inaugurated on March 17, 1940, as part of the unveiling of the Bariloche Civic Center, which was commissioned by the national government as part of an effort to promote the then-remote Río Negro Province ski resort town. The museum, and its accompanying Domingo Sarmiento Public Library and Bariloche City Hall, were designed by Ernesto de Estrada. Built from polished green tuff, cypress and fitzroya, with slate roofing, the buildings are centered by a plaza put down entirely in flagstone pavers.

== Collections ==
The majority of its collections were requisitioned from the National Parks Adeministration by the museum's first director, Enrique Artayeta. Named in honor of Argentine surveyor and academic Francisco Moreno, the institution was organized in the tradition of the La Plata Museum, whose 1888 establishment was owed in large measure to the renowned explorer.

Expanded and modernized during a 1992 restoration, the museum's collections are divided by a number of categorized halls:

- Natural Sciences: a collection of fossils and geological findings.
- Prehistory: informative dioramas and stratigraphy displays, as well as relics from Stone Age cultures in the area.
- Aboriginal History: displays pertaining to the Mapuche, Selkʼnam, Tehuelche and Yámana cultures, including implements used in astronomy.
- Regional History: exhibits tracing Patagonian history from the early years of Spanish colonization of the Americas to the time of the Argentine War of Independence
- The Conquest of the Desert: illustrating the tools, arms, and methods used by Argentine governments from Juan Manuel de Rosas' to Julio Roca's in their 19th-century campaigns to displace native peoples, as well as those used by native caciques in their counteroffensives.
- San Carlos de Bariloche: exhibits relating to local history, from the town's establishment in 1885, to its promotion by Public Works Minister Ezequiel Ramos Mexía after 1905 and its later development.
- National Parks: documents, diagrams, and maps pertaining to the development of National parks in Argentina, among which Bariloche's Lake Nahuel Huapi was the first.
- Francisco Moreno: an exhibit honoring the museum's namesake, the noted surveyor and academic who donated Lake Nahuel Huapi and its surroundings in 1903 to create the nation's first national park.

The museum also includes a hall for temporary exhibits, an auditorium, workshop, library and archives, as well as facilities for curators and researchers.

The Bariloche Civic Center, including the museum, was declared a National Historic Monument in 1987.
