= Robert B. Ferguson Museum of Mineralogy =

Mineral Museum in Fort Garry (Winnipeg), Manitoba

- Established: 1918
- Location: Wallace Building, University of Manitoba, Winnipeg, Manitoba, Canada
- Coordinates: 49.8117°N 97.1358°W
- Type: Mineralogy

The Robert B. Ferguson Museum of Mineralogy is a museum in Winnipeg, Manitoba, Canada, located at the University of Manitoba in the Wallace Building.

The museum got its start in 1918 by way of a donation from geologist Joseph Winthrop Spencer. His 1,100 mineral and rock specimen formed the basis of the early museum. The museum has grown over the years through various donations.

Part of the collection is on display for the benefit of students. One sixth of the collection is displayed in the Wallace Building, and is arranged from the most chemically and structurally simple to progressively more complex.

Many of the most attractive mineral specimens are on public display at the Ed Leith Cretaceous Menagerie.

== Affiliations ==
The Museum is affiliated with: CMA, CHIN, and Virtual Museum of Canada.
