= Saint Petersburg State University Museum of the Department of Invertebrate Zoology =

Museum in Saint Petersburg, Russia

The Saint Petersburg State University Museum of Invertebrate Zoology is a study museum of marine zoology in Saint Petersburg State University founded in 1822.

The first active director (1833–1861) was Stepan Semyonovich Kutorga (1806–1861). The second (1862-1888) was Karl Fedorovich Kessler (1815–1881). The early marine collections are primarily from the Mediterranean due to associations with Stazione Zoologica in Naples and Villefranche Zoological Station in France. Later material is from the White Sea, Barents Sea, the Baltic Sea, the Caspian Sea, Black Sea and Red Sea as well as the oceans. The museum also contains 4,500 bird skins (1,100 species) and 1,160 recordings of birds sounds.

The address is Zoological Museum, Depts of Vertebrate and Invertebrate Zoology, Faculty of Biology and Soil Sciences, Saint Petersburg State University, Universitetskaya nab. 7/9, 199034 Sankt-Peterburg, Russia
