= Geological Museum and Art Gallery (Dilijan) =

Museum in Dilijan, Armenia

Coordinates: 40.7384°N 44.8670°E

The Regional Museum and Art Gallery of Dilijan
- Դիլիջանի երկրագիտական թանգարան-պատկերասրահ
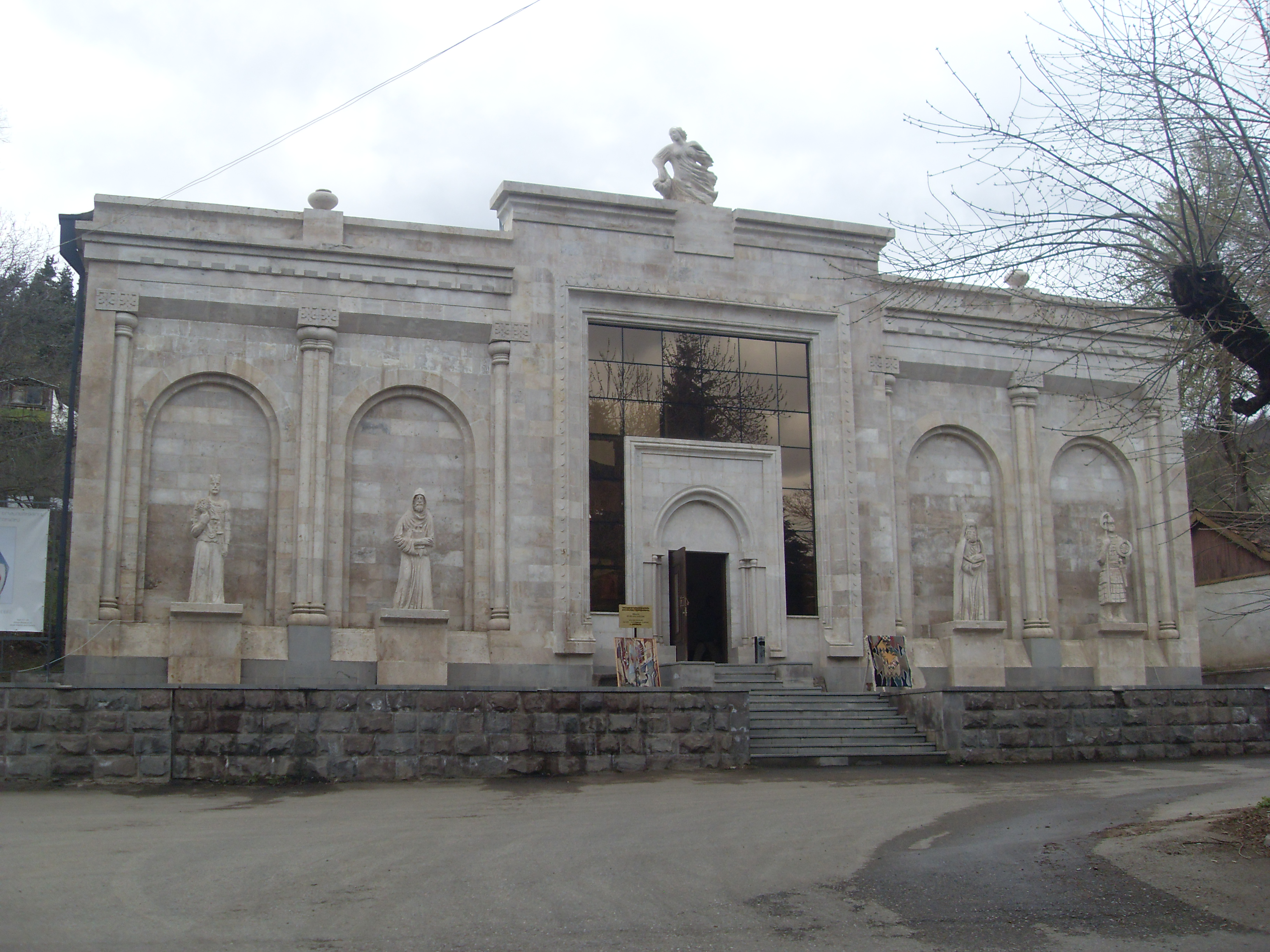
- Established: 1950 (museum), 1958 (art gallery)
- Location: 28 Myasnikyan str. Dilijan, Tavush Region, Armenia
- Director: Ghazar Ghazaryan

The Regional Museum and Art Gallery of Dilijan is a museum of local history and an art gallery in Dilijan, Armenia.

The museum was opened in 1950 by the teacher Yeghishe Hovsepyan. It provides a comprehensive view of the history of Dilijan, the historical development of the local people, their lifestyle, culture monuments, and historical and geographical conditions. The art gallery was established in 1958.

== History ==
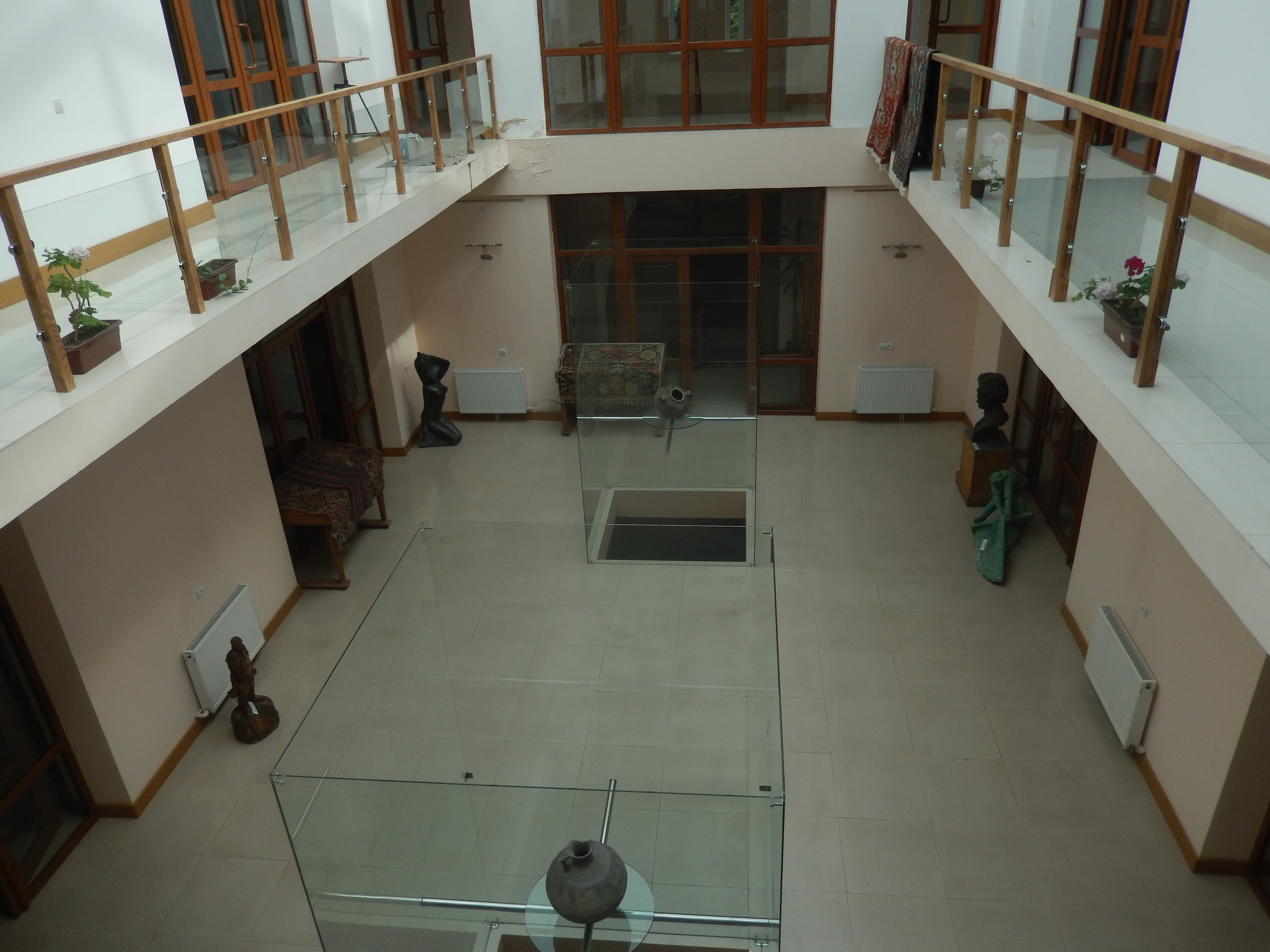

Though the museum was established by Yeghishe Hovsepyan, its long-time director Albert Matinyan and the Honored Artist of Armenia Hovhannes Sharambeyan made every effort to make it treasury of archaeological items and works of art. Initially, all the items were collected in the town library. The former building of the museum was built in 1926 as a hotel, later used as a hospital and afterwards again was used as a hotel. It underwent reconstruction in 1927 to host the Geological Museum and Art Gallery of Dilijan. The old building of the museum was demolished, and during five years new building of the museum was built. The official opening of the museum was held in 2010. It was opened to the public on 1 April 2011.

== Collections ==
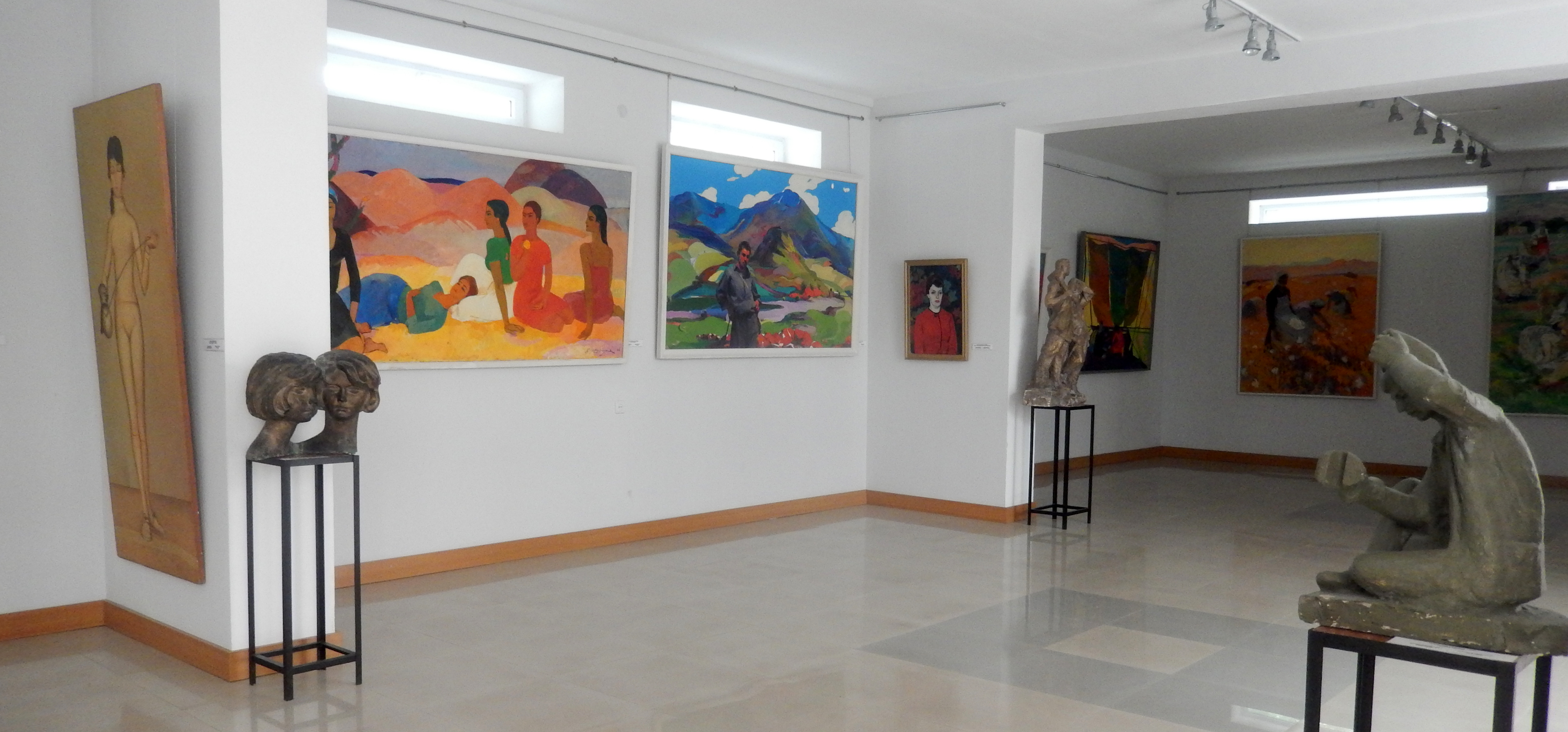

The museum exhibits the original works of Hovhannes Aivazovsky, Gevorg Bashinjaghian, Vardges Sureniants, Panos Terlemezyan, Edgar Chahine, Lev Lagorio, and Jean-Baptiste Greuzeare. It has also works of Dutch, Italian and French painters of the 16th, 17th, and 18th centuries, as well as paintings by the American painter Rockwell Kent and works of Jean Carzou.
