= Hiroshima City Ebayama Museum of Meteorology =

Museum in Hiroshima, Japan

Coordinates: 34.366174°N 132.43513°E

Hiroshima City Ebayama Museum of Meteorology 広島市江波山気象館
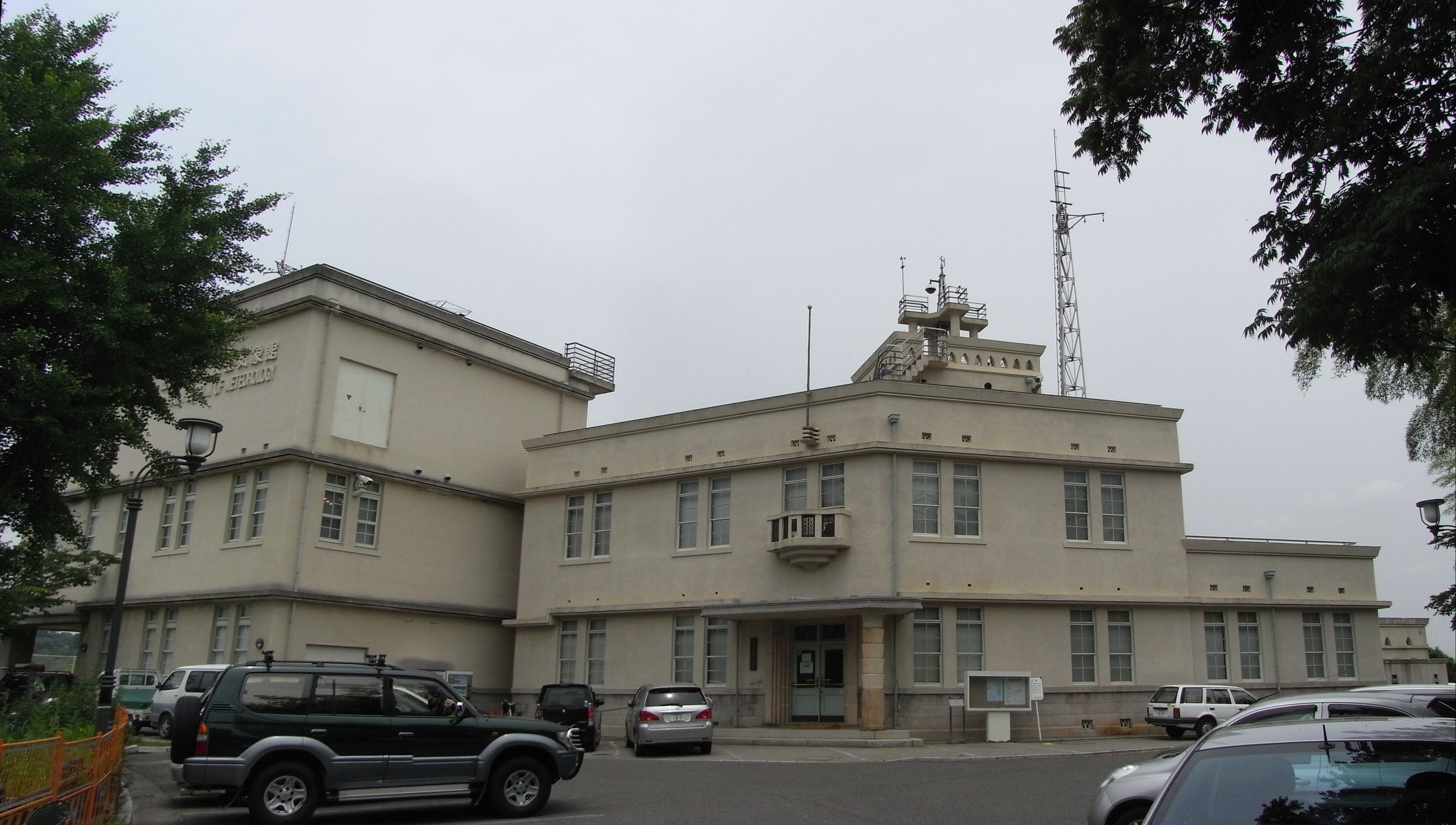
- Established: January, 1879, built in December, 1934, moved current place in January, 1935
- Location: 40-1, Ebaminami 1-chome, Naka-ku, Hiroshima
- Director: Date Saburo
- Website: www.ebayama.jp

The Hiroshima City Ebayama Museum of Meteorology (広島市江波山気象館, Hiroshima-shi Ebayama Kishōkan) was the first museum of meteorology in Japan. It is located in Ebayama Park in the city of Hiroshima, Hiroshima Prefecture, Japan.

== History ==
- Opened as the Japanese first Prefecutal meteorological observatory in Kako-machi, Hiroshima, Aki, Hiroshima, on January 1, 1879.
- Moved to Kokutaiji-machi, Hiroshima, Aki, Horoshima on December 31, 1892.
- New building was completed in Eba-machi, Hiroshima, in 1934.
- Moved to the new building on January 1, 1935.
- Nationalized as the Hiroshima weather station of the Central Meteorological Observatory of the Ministry of Education on November 1, 1939.
- Renewed as the Hiroshima Meteorological Observatory of the Ministry of Transport in November 1943.
- Suffered from the A-bomb, lost staff and instruments but continued the observation on August 6, 1945.
- Renamed as the Hiroshima District Meteorological Observatory on August 11, 1945.
- Suffered great damage from the Makurazaki Typhoon on September 17, 1945.
- Renamed sa the Hiroshima Local Meteorological Observatory on November 1, 1949.
- The competent authorities was changed to the Meteorological Agency on July 1, 1956.
- The Hiroshima Local Meteorological Observatory was moved to Kami-hachobori, Naka-ku, Hiroshima, on December 22, 1987.
- The building was placed under the Hiroshima City to preserve on November 1, 1990.
- The building was reborn as the first Museum of Meteorology in Japan on June 1, 1992.
- The building was designated as an important cultural asset by Hiroshima City on July 25, 2000.
- Started the weather forecast for Hiroshima city area on July 20, 2003.

== Museum ==
=== Permanent exhibitions ===
- Study tour of the weather forecast
- search the weather information through the internet
- Videos
- Instruments for the weather observation
- Experiment services of the weather
  - Wind capsule
  - Laboratories of Franklin
- Consultations about the weather

=== Education programs ===
- Science show
  - Delivery services of the science show
- Science workshop
- Natural science
- Science volunteer activities
- Internship system
- Weekly mail magazine

== Modern cultural heritage ==
- Prewar style building
  - Windows with the shorter side at the top
  - Side belt and other parts of the wall with uneven decoration
  - Simple geometric design
  - Thin eaves of the porch
  - Original design of the capitals
  - Time consumed interior decorations
- photos

== A-bombed building ==
- Preserved the A-bombed wall
- Bent window frame by the bomb blast
- The wall with the stuck grass
- photos

== Access ==
- Hiroden Eba-sakae-machi bus stop
- Hiroden Eba Station

== See also ==
- Atomic Bombing – August 6, 1945
- Makurazaki Typhoon – September 17, 1945
  - one of the three largest Typhoons of the Shōwa era
  - 1229 dead, 1054 injured, 783 missing in Hiroshima Prefecture
- A Blank in the Weather Map
  - Non-fiction book about the Hiroshima Meteorological Observatory in 1945
  - written by Kunio Yanagida
- Hiroshima Witness
