= Ashoro Museum of Paleontology =

Museum in Japan

- 足寄動物化石博物館
- Interactive map of the Ashoro Museum of Paleontology area

General information
- Location: 1-29-25 Kōnan, Ashoro, Hokkaidō, Japan
- Coordinates: 43°13′51″N 143°32′35″E
- Opened: 1998

Website
- Official website

Ashoro Museum of Paleontology (足寄動物化石博物館, Ashoro Dōbutsu Kaseki Hakubutsukan) opened in Ashoro, Hokkaidō, Japan in 1998. The collection includes desmostylians and other fossils from the area as well as geological exhibits relating to the Onnetō Hot Falls.

== Publications ==
- Bulletin of Ashoro Museum of Paleontology (足寄動物化石博物館紀要) (2000—)

== See also ==
- List of prehistoric mammals of Japan
- Mukawa Town Hobetsu Museum
