= Rahmat International Wildlife Museum & Gallery =

- Rahmat Gallery
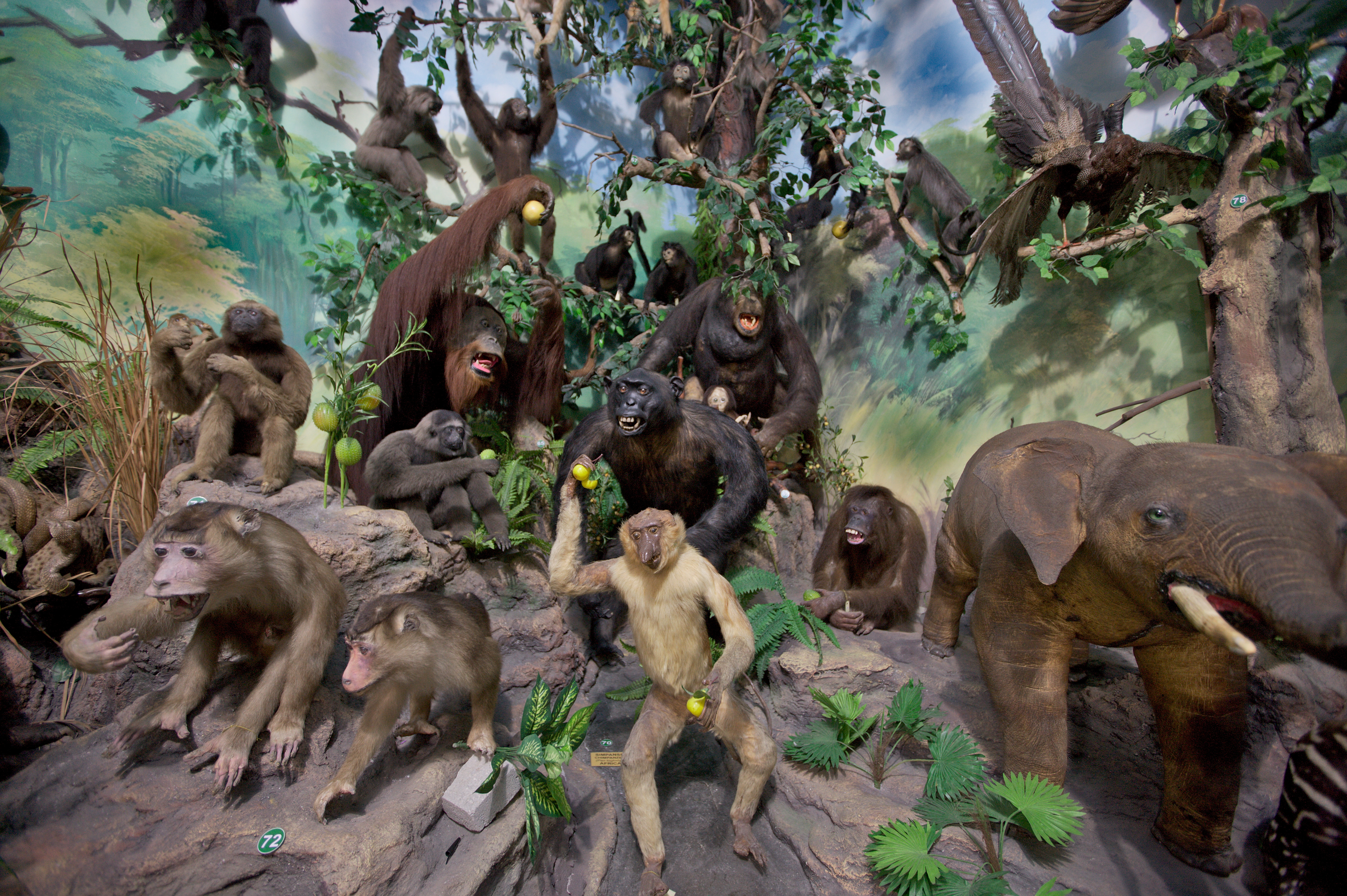
- Taxidermy collection on the museum
- Interactive map of the Rahmat International Wildlife Museum & Gallery area

General information
- Type: Museum
- Location: Medan, Indonesia
- Coordinates: 3.58°N 98.67°E
- Inaugurated: May 14, 1999
- Renovated: November 28, 2013

Website
- http://www.rahmatgallery.com/

Rahmat International Wildlife Museum & Gallery is a natural history museum in Medan, Indonesia. The museum displays collections of various wildlife from the smallest to the largest according to the habitat. After the development was completed in October 2007, the Museum & Gallery has an area of 2970 m² building.

Its founder is a fan of sport hunting and the conservation of nature. Through the museum, he invites visitor to better understand the diversity of wildlife that exist in the world and their importance.

== Founder ==
The founder is Rahmat Shah, a sports fan and a professional hunting conservationist and nature lover who has traveled around various parts of the world to study directly the concept of conservation that has been adopted by many countries including USA, Canada, Russia, Germany, Turkey, France, Italy, Spain, Austria, China, Kazakhstan, Romania, Mongolia, Iran, Pakistan, Australia, New Zealand, almost all of Africa and other countries in order to prevent extinction and increase wildlife populations and their habitats that remain stable throughout the period.

== Facility ==
- Library
- Souvenir Shop
- Café
- Photo Studio
- Legend Room
