= University of Tartu Natural History Museum =

Museum in Tartu, Estonia

Coordinates: 58°22′24″N 26°42′59″E

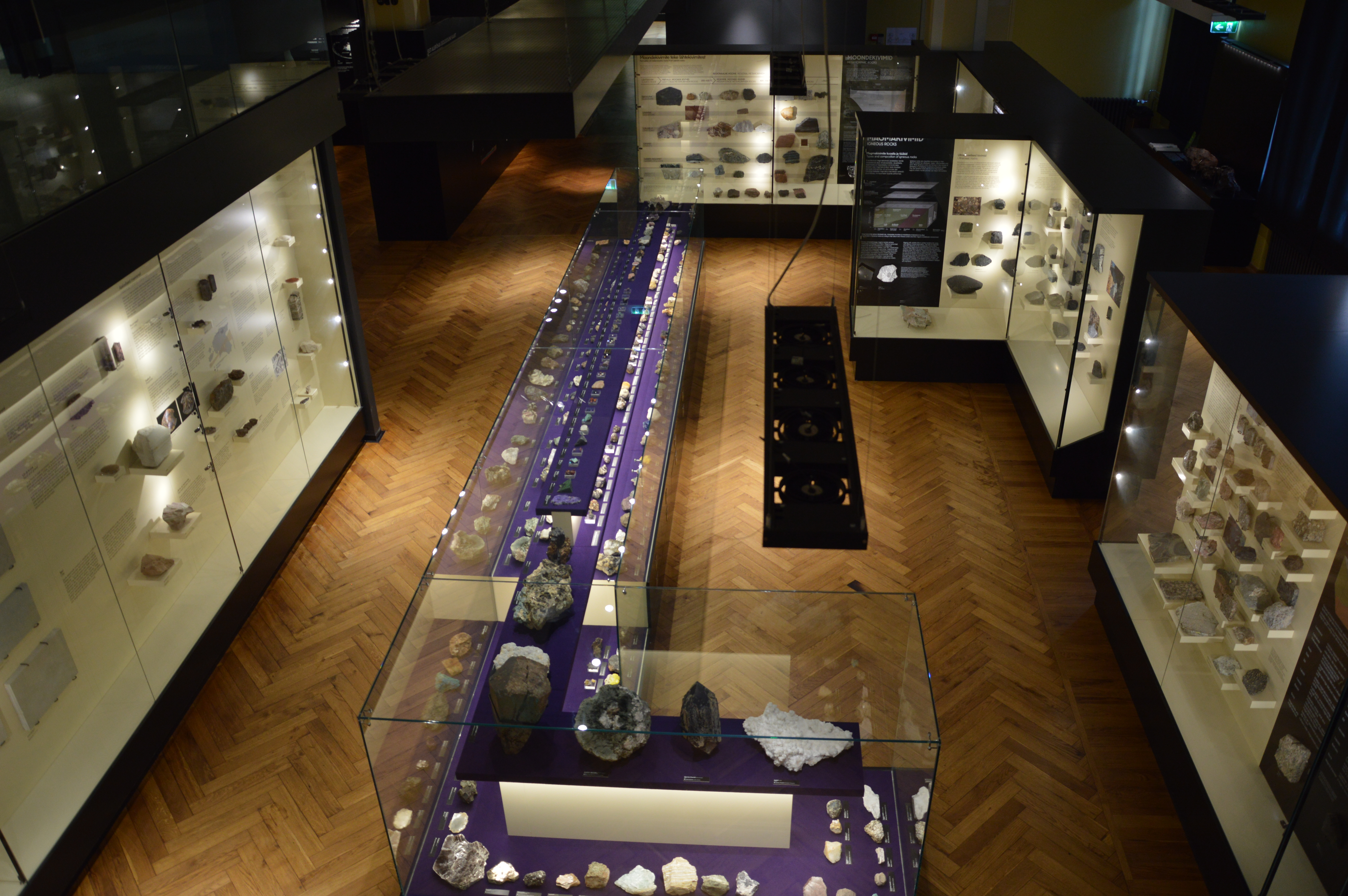
University of Tartu Natural History Museum

University of Tartu Natural History Museum (Estonian: Tartu Ülikooli Loodusmuuseum) is a natural history museum in Tartu, Estonia. The museum is affiliated with Tartu University.

The museum was established in 1802.

The museum has zoological, geological, botanical and mycological collections. The permanent exhibition of the museum is titled as "Earth. Life. Story."
