= Geological Museum of the State Geological Institute =

Coordinates: 52°12′32″N 21°0′47″E

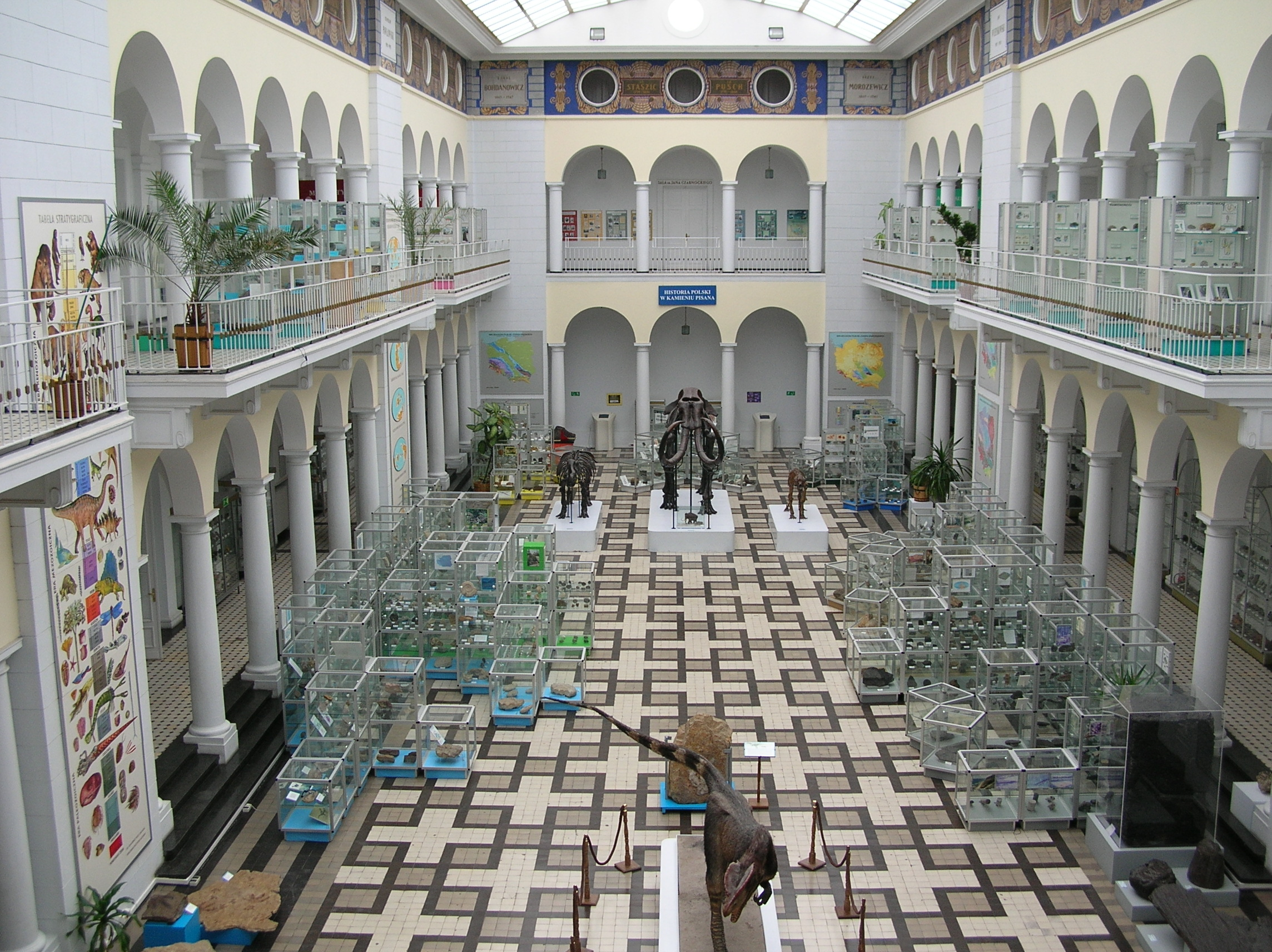
- Established: 1919
- Location: Rakowiecka 4 Warsaw, Poland
- Type: science museum
- Public transit access: Pole Mokotowskie
- Website: muzeum.pgi.gov.pl

The Geological Museum of the State Geological Institute (Polish: Muzeum Geologiczne Państwowego Instytutu Geologicznego) is a museum in Warsaw, Poland. The museum was established in 1919.

== History ==
On April 3, 1919, members of the Galician Parliament headed by Wincenty Witos appealed to the Sejm of the Republic of Poland to establish the Polish Institute of Geology, which began operating on May 7, 1919. The first director of the Institute was Józef Morozewicz, the professor of the Jagiellonian University - who emphasized that the Institute must have: "A museum that would house a possibly complete collection of fossil specimens found on Polish soil, and that would store originals and material evidence of scientific dissertations, by PGI (Polish Geological Institute) in print published".

The first chief curator of the museum was Jan Czarnocki, who created the museum collection. The main collection of the museum consisted of collections collected by geologists, as well as exhibits donated from the Museum of Industry and Agriculture and the Warsaw University of Technology.

The main building of the Geology Institute where the museum is located was partially commissioned in 1930. It was then that the final move from the Staszic Palace took place. In the new building, the entire first floor of the main pavilion, including three rooms with a total area of 1500 m2 and 20 cellars in the basement (600 m 2), has been dedicated to the Geological Museum. This arrangement was based on the architectural assumptions of the Institute of Mining in St. Petersburg and the British Geological Museum in London, where the exhibition was placed in the main halls, and around them were arranged rooms for exhibitions and studios.

In 1939, almost 200 collections were registered in the Book of Acquisitions, which translated into several hundred thousand items. During the Warsaw Uprising in 1944, a large part of the museum was burned, and it was possible to save 30% of the specimens. In 1945, under the leadership of Roman Kozłowski, the reconstruction of the Institute and museum collections began. In the 1950s, the museum was decorated with a specimen of salt from the Wieliczka Crystal Caves, a petrified trunk of a Carboniferous gymnosperm tree and skeletons of Pleistocene mammals. The mammoth skeleton exhibited at the PGI museum was assembled in the summer of 1957 from bone materials from the Pyskowice site by prof. dr. Zbigniew Ryziewicz and dr. Teresa Czyżewska from the University of Wrocław.

In the 1950s, two permanent exhibitions were launched under the leadership of Dr. Maria Żelichowska: Mineral resources of Poland - on the ground floor and Stratigraphy of Poland - on the first floor. Most of the specimens were placed in desktop display cases, above which there were tables with text and graphic information. In 1970, the museum was enriched with two new exhibitions: petrographic and mineralogical. These exhibitions contained approximately 300 minerals and rocks. On the 90th anniversary of the existence of the Polish Geological Institute, a commemorative plaque dedicated to Paweł Edmund Strzelecki was unveiled, and the main exhibition hall was named after him.

== Exhibitions ==
The museum has been divided into eight thematic exhibitions: Material of the Earth, Polish building Stone, Mineral Resources of Poland, Fossilized World, Magmatism, Sedimentation and Diagenesis, Metamorphism, Geological History of Poland 1919-1999.

=== Material of the Earth ===
The "Material of the Earth" exhibition presents almost 550 minerals and rocks from around the world that make up the lithosphere. Based on their chemical composition, the various classes of minerals as native elements, sulfides, halides, oxides and hydroxides, carbonates, sulfates, borates and phosphates, silicates and quartz group are discussed.

The second part of the exhibition presents the variety of rocks. The basis for their classification is the genesis, mineral composition as well as structure (the way the ingredients are formed) and texture (the way the ingredients are distributed).

=== Polish building stone ===
The exhibition "Polish building stone in the past and today" presents selected stone materials from quarries of different regions of Poland used in construction and found in the architectural design of Polish cities. Some of the presented stone raw materials are no longer mined, but most are still available for construction. The exposed wall panels are 60 x 50 cm and the order results from the genesis of the rocks. On one side of the staircase there are compact limestones, commonly known as "Kielce marbles", represented mainly by rocks from quarries in the Świętokrzyskie region. A sequence of carbonate sedimentary rocks turns into metamorphosed crystalline limestones - marbles from the Sławniowice and Stronie Śląskie deposits. On the other side of the staircase there are polished granites and syenites of the Sudetes, Pieniny andesite and sandstones from the areas of Lower Silesia and Świętokrzyskie.

=== Mineral resources of Poland ===
The exhibition devoted to mineral resources presents four main types: energy, metallic, chemical (non-metallic), rock (construction). The exhibition presents the origin of the deposits, the regions of their occurrence, and the methods of extracting minerals. The exhibition showcased several hundred specimens of minerals and rocks, primarily sourced from various regions of Poland.

=== Fossilized world ===
The exhibition presents fossils of groups of animals as sponges, corals, molluscs such as clams, snails, tentaculites and cephalopods, arthropods, bryozoans, brachiopods, echinoderms, graptolites. The exhibition features nearly 700 specimens sourced from around the globe, showcasing a diverse range of minerals and rocks from various regions of the world.

=== Magmatism ===
About 150 exhibits include minerals of igneous rocks and various types of rocks formed as a result of magmatic melting, products of volcanic eruptions of post-magmatic processes. In the exhibition, the themes are displayed in images as well as illustrations and diagrams.

=== Metamorphism ===
"Metamorphism" exhibition features descriptions of over seventy specimens from around the world, including minerals and formed rocks, representative of three types of sedimentary environments: terrestrial, transitional, and marine.

=== Sedimentation and Diagenesis ===
The exhibition describes the sedimentary environments, the sedimentary and biogenic structures associated with them. Over seventy specimens from around the world represent three types of sedimentary environments: terrestrial, transitional and marine.

=== Geological History of Poland 1919-1999 ===
The exhibition in the main hall of the museum presents the geological history of Poland, from the Archean to modern times, using showcases marked with standard stratigraphic colors and presenting specimens from each geological system. The displays offer general information about each era and period, including typical fossils, rocks, and minerals found in specific regions of Poland. Other exhibits include skeletons of Quaternary mammals, a dilophosaurus model, dinosaur footprints, and Carboniferous and Neogene tree trunks. The exhibition is complemented by geological maps of Poland, a stratigraphic table depicting the evolution of the organic world, a board illustrating the distribution of continents throughout Earth's history, and a diorama featuring models of the first land tetrapods.

== Gallery ==
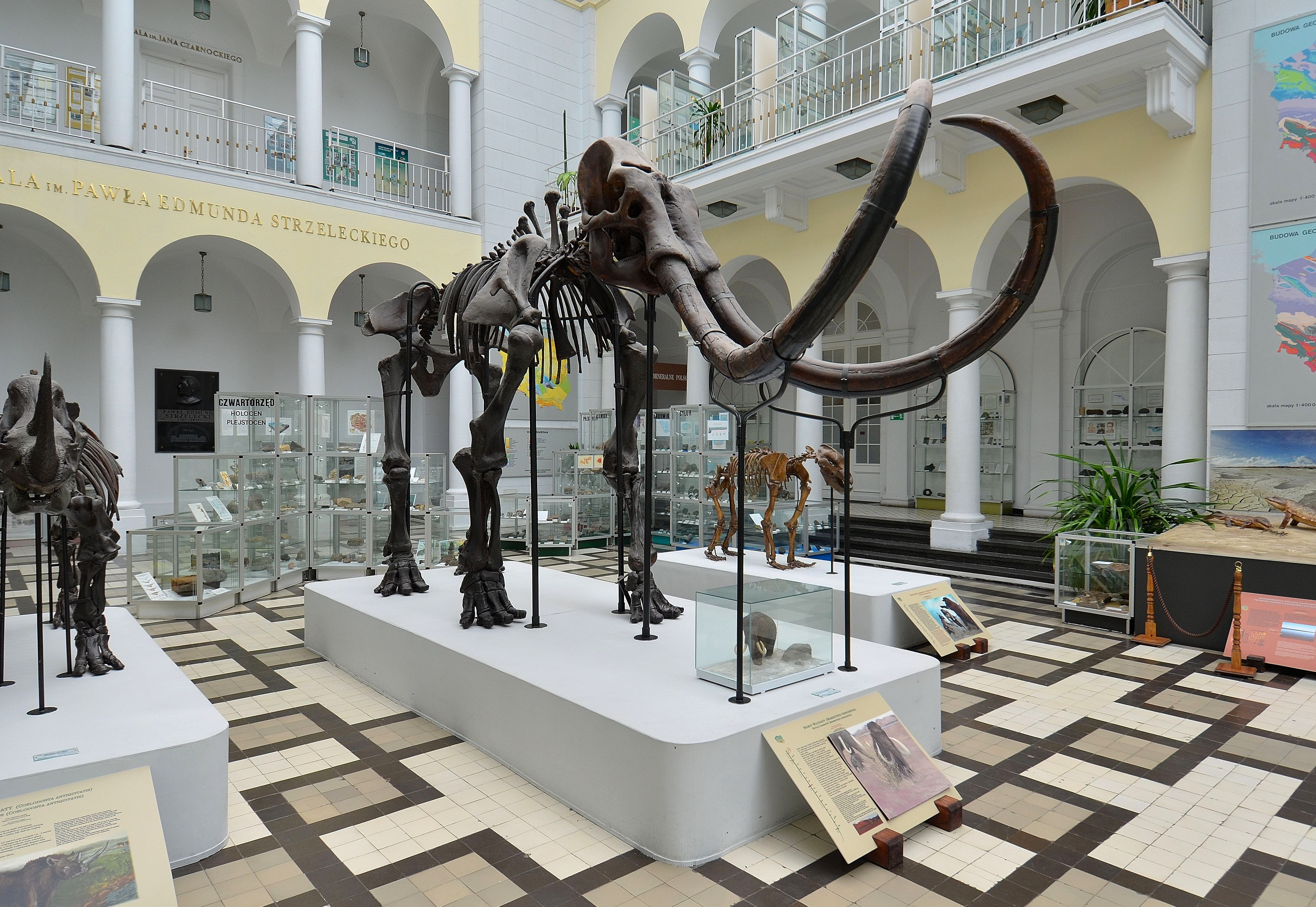
Mammuthus primigenius Blumenbach

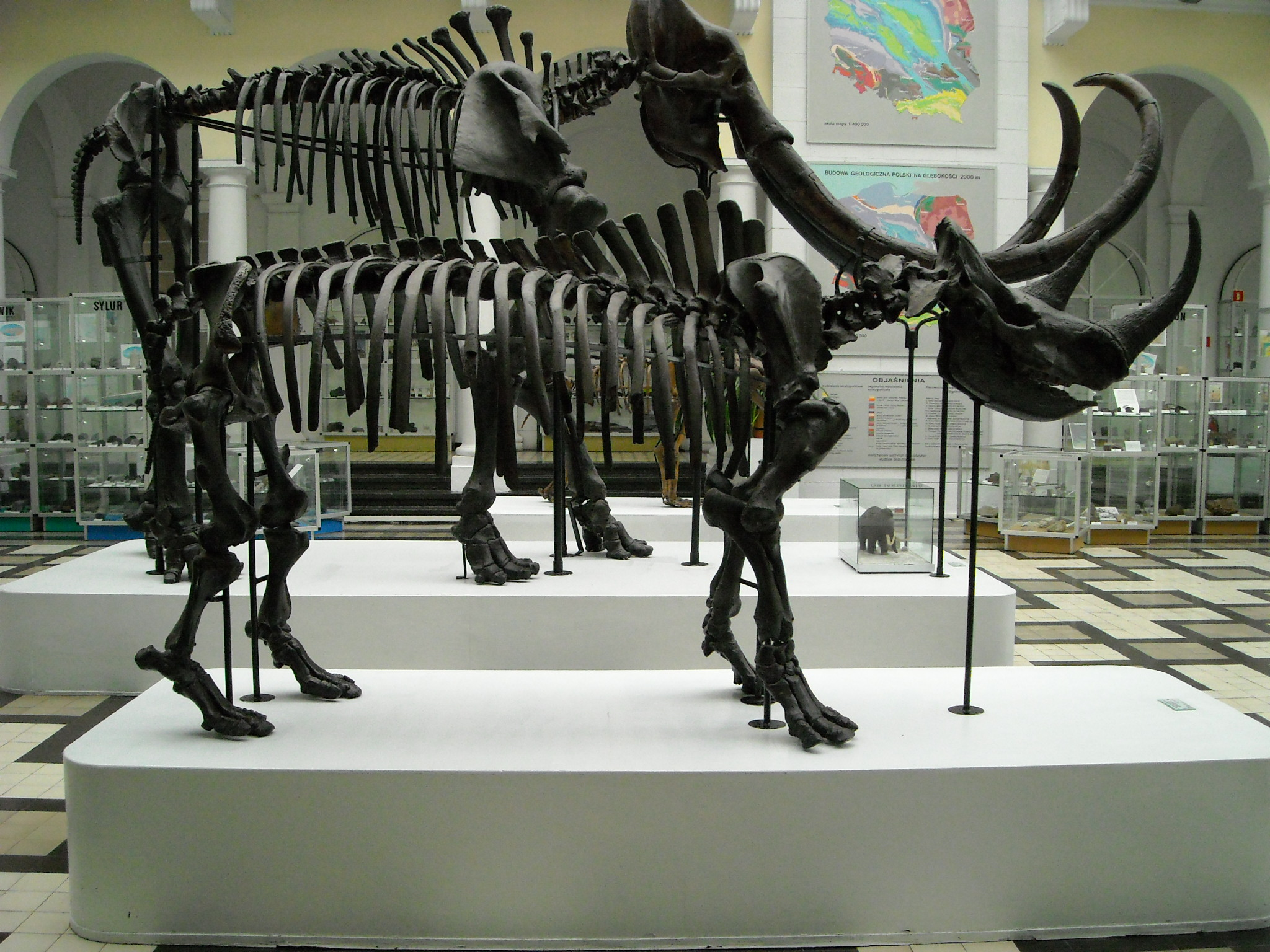
Coelodonta antiquitatis Blumenbach

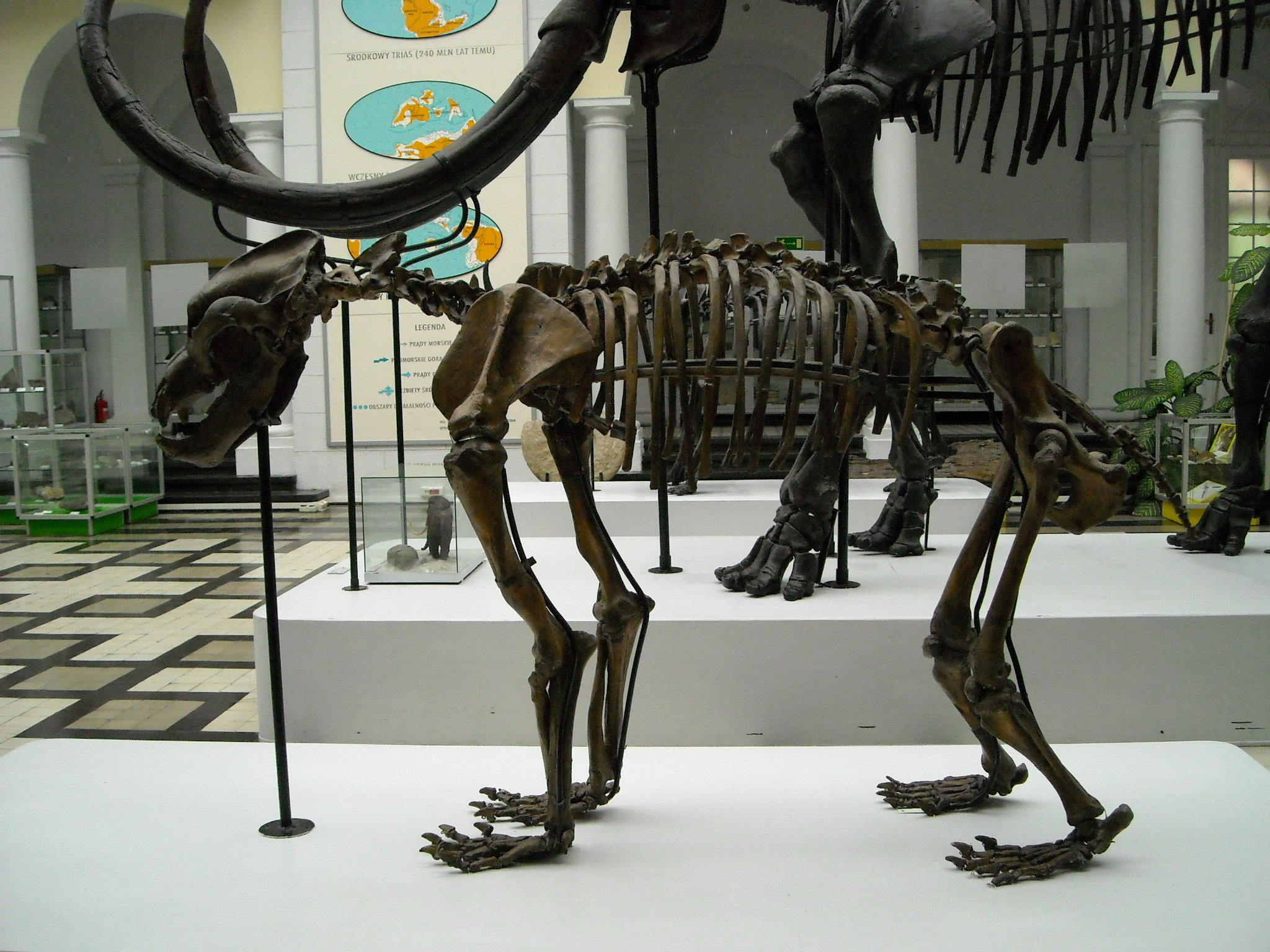
Ursus spelaeus Rosenmüller

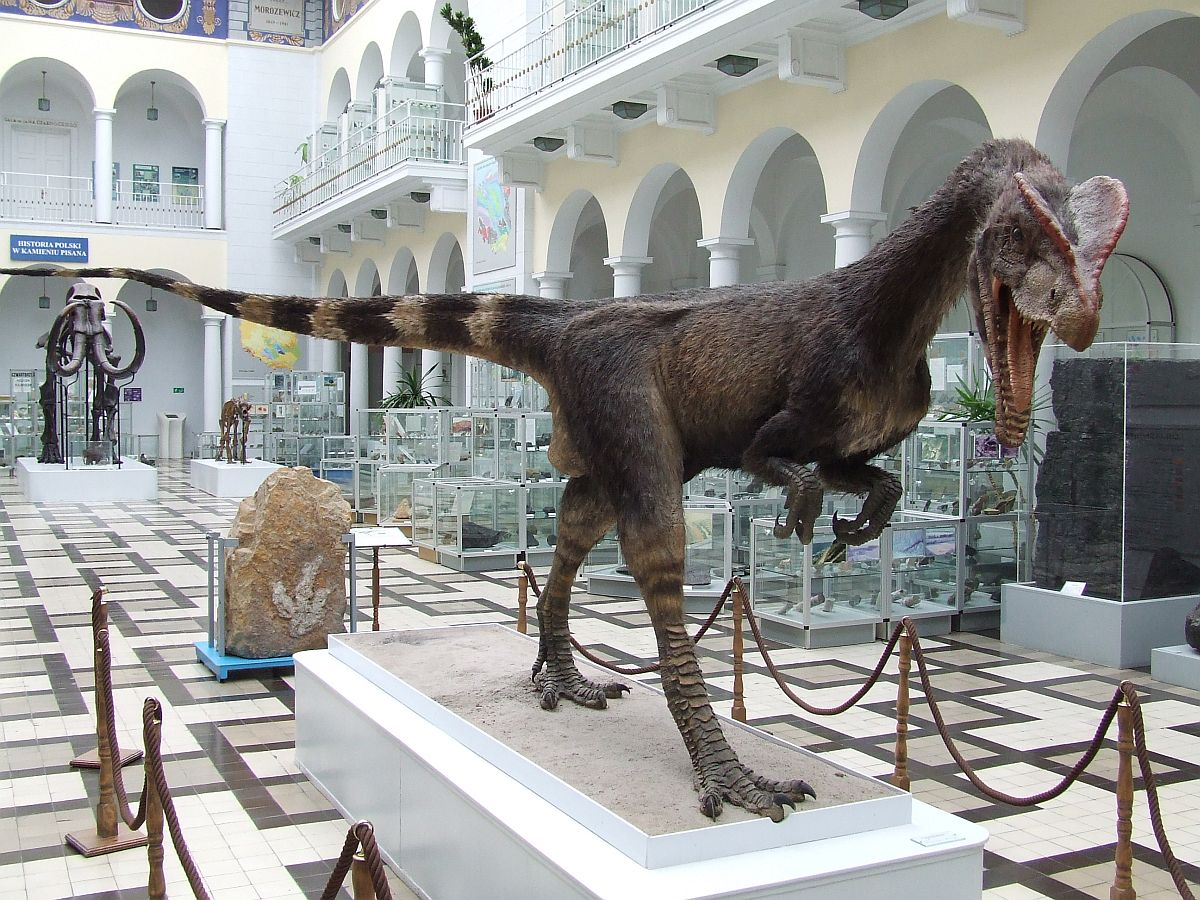
Dilophosaurus wetherilli

== See also ==
Museum of Evolution of Polish Academy of Sciences

Warsaw Rising Museum
