= National Earth Science Museum =

Coordinates: 22.6008°S 17.0835°E

- Type: Earth Science Museum
- Collections: minerals, fossils, petrology, and meteorites
- Director: Gloria Simubali
- Website: https://www.mme.gov.na/gsn/museum/

The National Earth Science Museum (also known as the Geological Survey Museum) in Windhoek is Namibia's central geological museum. It is maintained by the State Geological Survey of Namibia under the Ministry of Mines and Energy.

== Collection ==
The collections at the National Earth Science Museum have been built up through over years and include large collections of minerals, fossils, petrology, and meteorites.

== Exhibition ==
The largest geological collection in Namibia shows exhibits from the various mining areas in Namibia in several sections, including the Tsumeb region, the Rössing mine, the Navachab gold mine and the Rosh Pinah zinc mine.

In the Tsumeb department, for example, exhibits from the dissolution of an ore mine are on display. These include 226 different minerals, 40 of which only occur in this area. There are also various gemstones. A special feature of the exhibition is the presentation of mineral raw materials together with possible end products such as ceramic objects. Namcor, the state-owned oil and gas company, presents photos of exploration for oil and gas reserves, such as the Kudu gas field.

In addition, fossils are exhibited in the museum, some of which are more than 750 million years old and were found during various explorations. A more than 200 million year old Massospondylus is the center of this exhibition.
