= Iwaki City Coal & Fossil Museum =

Museum in Iwaki, Fukushima Prefecture, Japan

- いわき市石炭・化石館（ほるる）

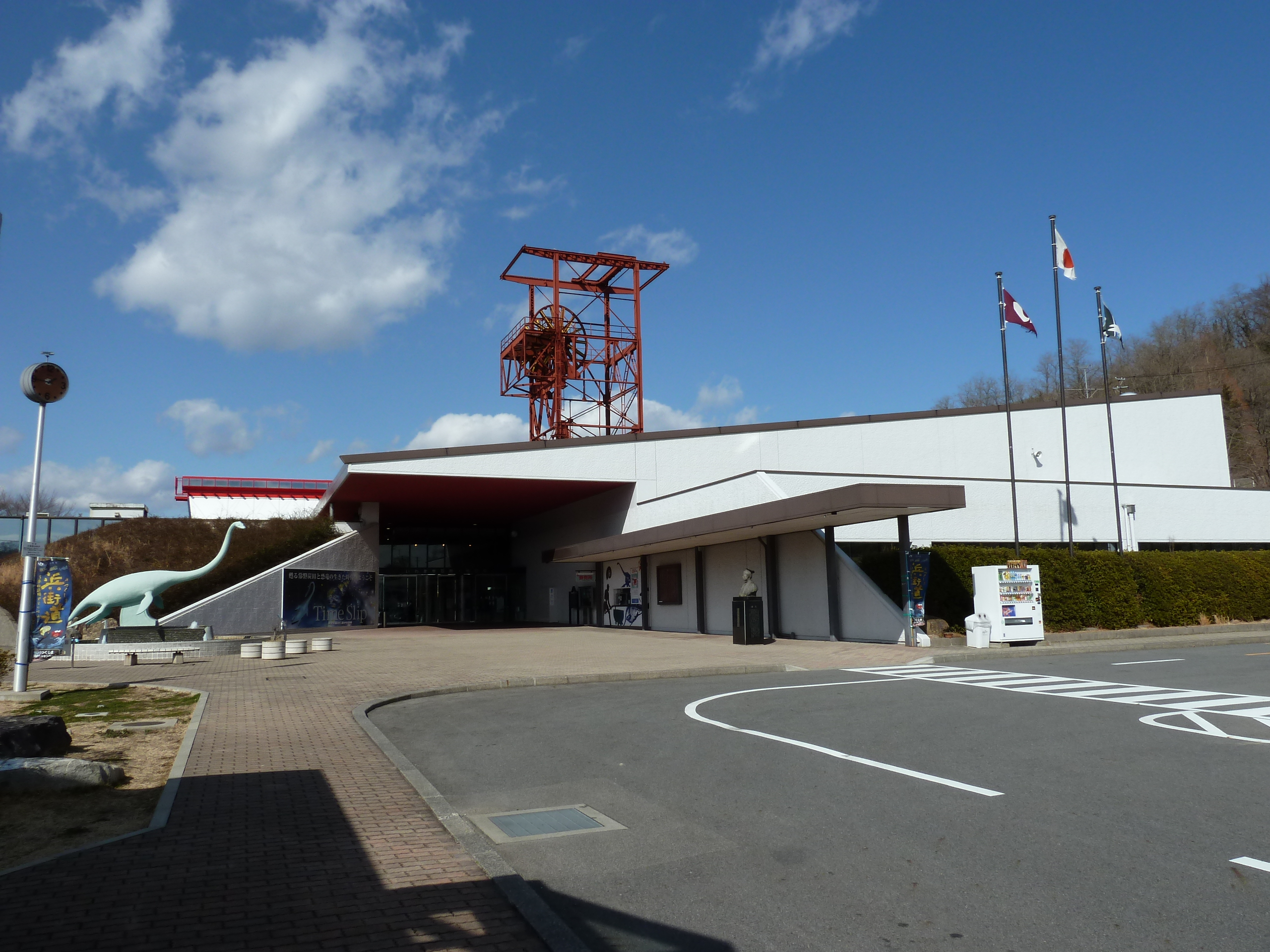

General information
- Location: 3-1 Mukaida, Jōban Yumoto-machi, Iwaki, Fukushima Prefecture, Japan
- Coordinates: 37°00′45″N 140°50′54″E
- Opened: 18 October 1984

Website
- Official website

Iwaki City Coal & Fossil Museum (いわき市石炭・化石館, Iwaki-shi sekitan・kaseki-kan), nicknamed Horuru (ほるる), opened in Iwaki, Fukushima Prefecture, Japan in 1984. The collection and displays relate to local fossil finds — including the plesiosaur Futabasaurus suzukii — and the Jōban coalfield, once the largest on Honshū.

== See also ==
- Shiramizu Amidadō
