= Stephen Hui Geological Museum =

Geological museum in Hong Kong

Coordinates: 22.28260°N 114.1370°E

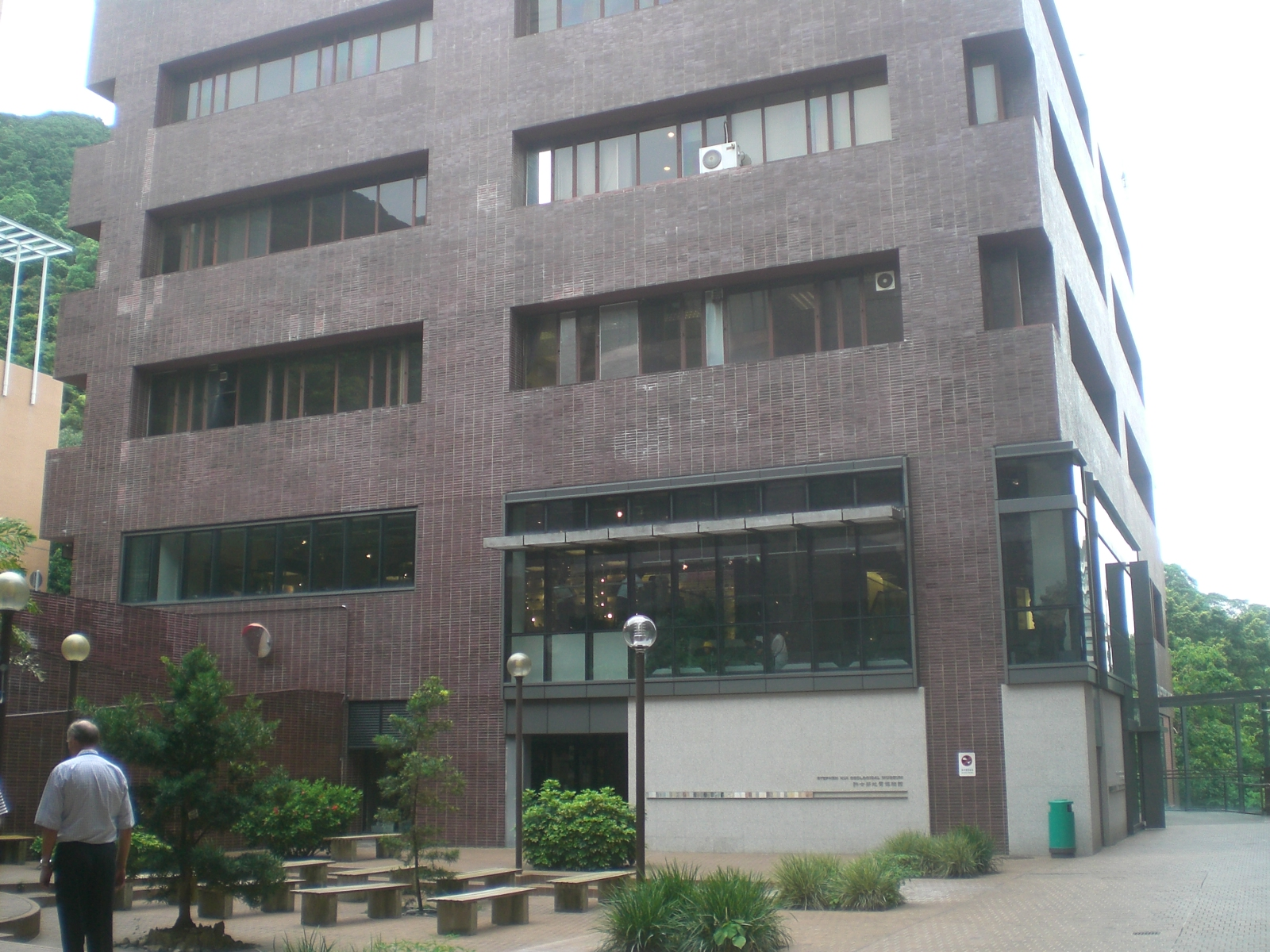
The Stephen Hui Geological Museum

The Stephen Hui Geological Museum (Chinese: 許士芬地質博物館; pinyin: Xǔshìfēn Dìzhí Bówùguǎn) is the first and only geological museum in Hong Kong. It is located on the ground and first floors of the James Hsioung Lee Building (厲樹雄科學館), in the University of Hong Kong Main Campus. The museum is part of the Department of Earth Sciences, the only earth sciences department in Hong Kong.

With the goal of making the rock collection available for public viewing, the museum opened on January 16, 2009. It houses around 10,000 catalogued specimens from different parts of the world. In 2014, a student examining the museum's collections discovered a fish fossil which was estimated to be around 147 million-years-old. The fossil was later determined to be the first dinosaur-era fish to be identified from Hong Kong.

The museum is open from Mondays to Fridays, 1PM to 6PM, with mornings reserved for guided group tours.

In 2017, the museum hosted the largest exhibition of private geological collections in Hong Kong.
