= 2015 in archosaur paleontology =

This article records new taxa of fossil archosaurs of every kind that are scheduled described during the year 2015, as well as other significant discoveries and events related to paleontology of archosaurs that are scheduled to occur in the year 2015.

== Pseudosuchians ==
=== Research ===
- Revision of the type material of Rauisuchus tiradentes is published by Lautenschlager and Rauhut (2015).
- A study on the changes in the morphology of vertebrae caused by increased adaptation to aquatic locomotion in the evolution of crocodylomorphs is published by Molnar et al. (2015).
- A study of the evolutionary history of the clade Crocodyliformes is published by Bronzati, Montefeltro and Langer (2015).
- A study of impact of the climate changes on the evolution and biodiversity of pseudosuchian archosaurs is published by Mannion et al. (2015).
- A study on the phylogenetic position of thalattosuchians within Crocodylomorpha is published by Wilberg (2015).
- A review of the diagnostic features of the species assigned to the genus Machimosaurus is published by Martin, Vincent & Falconnet (2015).
- An isolated metriorhynchid tooth is described from the Early Cretaceous (Aptian) Hybla Formation (Sicily, Italy) by Chiarenza et al. (2015), extending the known geological range of Metriorhynchidae and Thalattosuchia by approximately 7–8 million years; Fischer et al. (2015) subsequently caution that it might potentially be a pliosaurid tooth instead.

=== New taxa ===
Name	Novelty	Status	Authors	Age	Unit	Location	Notes	Images
Albertosuchus	Gen. et sp. nov	Valid	Wu & Brinkman	Latest Cretaceous	Scollard Formation	Canada	A crocodylian, probably a crocodyloid. The type species is Albertosuchus knudsenii.	
Allodaposuchus hulki	Sp. nov	Valid	Blanco et al.	Late Cretaceous (Maastrichtian)	Tremp Formation	Spain	A eusuchian crocodylomorph, a species of Allodaposuchus.	
Caiman wannlangstoni	Sp. nov	Valid	Salas-Gismondi et al.	Late Middle Miocene	Pebas Formation	Peru	A caiman, a species of Caiman.	
Carnufex	Gen. et sp. nov	Valid	Zanno et al.	Late Triassic (Carnian)	Pekin Formation	United States	An early member of Crocodylomorpha. The type species is Carnufex carolinensis.	
Dagasuchus	Gen. et sp. nov	Valid	Lacerda, Schultz & Bertoni-Machado	Triassic (late Ladinian/early Carnian)	Santa Maria Formation	Brazil	A non-crocodylomorph loricatan. The type species is Dagasuchus santacruzensis.	
Gnatusuchus	Gen. et sp. nov	Valid	Salas-Gismondi et al.	Late Middle Miocene	Pebas Formation	Peru	A caiman. The type species is Gnatusuchus pebasensis.	
Gorgetosuchus	Gen. et sp. nov	Valid	Heckert et al.	Late Triassic	Pekin Formation	United States	An aetosaur. The type species is Gorgetosuchus pekinensis.	
Koumpiodontosuchus	Gen. et sp. nov	Valid	Sweetman, Pedreira-Segade & Vidovic	Early Cretaceous (Barremian)	Wessex Formation	United Kingdom	A crocodyliform related to Bernissartia. The type species is Koumpiodontosuchus aprosdokiti.	
Kuttanacaiman	Gen. et sp. nov	Valid	Salas-Gismondi et al.	Late Middle Miocene	Pebas Formation	Peru	A caiman. The type species is Kuttanacaiman iquitosensis.	
Lohuecosuchus	Gen. et 2 sp. nov	Valid	Narváez et al.	Late Cretaceous (late Campanian-early Maastrichtian)		France; Spain	A eusuchian crocodyliform related to Allodaposuchus. The type species is Lohuecosuchus megadontos; genus also contains Lohuecosuchus mechinorum.	
Zoneait	Gen. et sp. nov	Valid	Wilberg	Middle Jurassic (Aalenian–Bajocian)	Snowshoe Formation	United States	A thalattosuchian crocodylomorph. The type species is Zoneait nargorum.	

== Non-avian dinosaurs ==
=== Research ===
- A study of phylogenetic relationships of sauropod dinosaurs belonging to the family Diplodocidae and the taxonomic revision of the family is published by Tschopp, Mateus and Benson (2015); the authors propose to reestablish Brontosaurus as a genus distinct from Apatosaurus and to transfer Dinheirosaurus lourinhanensis to the genus Supersaurus.
- Additional information on the anatomy of the holotype specimen of the rebbachisaurid sauropod Tataouinea hannibalis, including description of newly discovered fossil material of this specimen, and study of its phylogenetic relationships is published by Fanti et al. (2015).
- A reevaluation of the estimated body mass of Dreadnoughtus schrani is published by Bates et al. (2015).
- A study of phylogenetic relationships of ornithischian dinosaurs traditionally referred to as 'basal ornithopods' or 'hypsilophodontids' is published by Boyd (2015).
- Carpenter & Lamanna (2015) reinterpret the ornithopod braincase from the Morrison Formation of the Carnegie Quarry at Dinosaur National Monument (Utah), formerly assigned to Uteodon aphanoecetes, as actually belonging to Dryosaurus cf. D. altus. The authors consider genera Uteodon and Cumnoria to be junior synonyms of Camptosaurus, and transfer the species Cumnoria prestwichii and Uteodon aphanoecetes to the genus Camptosaurus.

=== New taxa ===
Name	Novelty	Status	Authors	Age	Unit	Location	Notes	Images
Augustynolophus	Gen. et comb. nov	Valid	Prieto-Márquez et al.	Late Cretaceous (late Maastrichtian)	Moreno Formation	United States	A hadrosaurid; a new genus for "Saurolophus" morrisi Prieto-Márquez & Wagner (2013).	
Boreonykus	Gen. et sp. nov	Valid	Bell & Currie	Late Cretaceous (late Campanian)	Wapiti Formation	Canada	A dromaeosaurid theropod. The type species is Boreonykus certekorum.	
Chilesaurus	Gen. et sp. nov.	Valid	Novas et al.	Late Jurassic (Tithonian)	Toqui Formation	Chile	A dinosaur of uncertain phylogenetic placement. Originally classified as a theropod dinosaur (a basal member of Tetanurae), but subsequently argued to be an ornithischian. The type species is Chilesaurus diegosuarezi.	
Crichtonpelta	Gen. et comb. nov	Valid	Arbour & Currie	Late Cretaceous (Cenomanian–Turonian)	Sunjiawan Formation	China	An ankylosaurine ankylosaurid; a new genus for "Crichtonsaurus" benxiensis Lü, Ji, Gao & Li (2007).	
Dakotaraptor	Gen. et sp. nov.	Valid	DePalma et al.	Late Cretaceous (Maastrichtian)	Hell Creek Formation	United States	A member of Dromaeosauridae. The type species is Dakotaraptor steini.	
Eucnemesaurus entaxonis	Sp. nov	Valid	McPhee et al.	Late Triassic	Lower Elliot Formation	South Africa	A non-sauropod sauropodomorph, a species of Eucnemesaurus.	
Galeamopus	Gen. et comb. nov	Valid	Tschopp, Mateus & Benson	Late Jurassic (Kimmeridgian)	Morrison Formation	United States	A diplodocid sauropod; a new genus for "Diplodocus" hayi Holland (1924).	
Gspsaurus	Gen. et comb. nov	Dubious	Malkani	Late Cretaceous (Maastrichtian)	Pab Formation	Pakistan	A titanosauriform sauropod. The type species is G. Pakistani.	
Haestasaurus	Gen. et comb. nov.	Valid	Upchurch, Mannion & Taylor	Early Cretaceous (late Berriasian—Valanginian)	Hastings Beds	United Kingdom	A macronarian sauropod of uncertain phylogenetic placement; a new genus for "Pelorosaurus" becklesii Mantell (1852).	
Horshamosaurus	Gen. et comb. nov	Valid	Blows	Early Cretaceous		United Kingdom	A new genus for "Polacanthus" rudgwickensis Blows (1996).	
Hualianceratops	Gen. et sp. nov.	Valid	Han et al.	Late Jurassic (Oxfordian)	Shishugou Formation	China	A basal ceratopsian, possibly a member of Chaoyangsauridae. The type species is Hualianceratops wucaiwanensis.	
Huanansaurus	Gen. et sp. nov.	Valid	Lü et al.	Late Cretaceous (Campanian-Maastrichtian)	Nanxiong Formation	China	An oviraptorid theropod. The type species is Huanansaurus ganzhouensis.	
Iguanodon galvensis	Sp. nov	Valid	Verdú et al.	Early Cretaceous (early Barremian)	Galve, Teruel	Spain	An ornithopod, a species of Iguanodon.	
Ischioceratops	Gen. et sp. nov.	Valid	He et al.	Late Cretaceous	Wangshi Group	China	A leptoceratopsid ceratopsian. The type species is Ischioceratops zhuchengensis.	
Koshisaurus	Gen. et sp. nov	Valid	Shibata & Azuma	Early Cretaceous	Kitadani Formation	Japan	A non-hadrosaurid hadrosauroid. The type species is Koshisaurus katsuyama.	
Kunbarrasaurus	Gen. et sp. nov.	Valid	Leahey et al.	Cretaceous (late Albian–(?)early Cenomanian)	Allaru Mudstone	Australia	An ankylosaur. The type species is Kunbarrasaurus ieversi.	
Lepidocheirosaurus	Gen. et sp. nov.	Disputed	Alifanov & Saveliev	Late Jurassic (Tithonian?)	Ukureyskaya Formation	Russia	A dinosaur of uncertain phylogenetic placement; considered to be a theropod dinosaur related to Nqwebasaurus by the authors of its description, but subsequently argued to be an ornithischian, possibly synonymous with Kulindadromeus. The type species is Lepidocheirosaurus natatilis.	
Lepidus	Gen. et sp. nov.	Valid	Nesbitt & Ezcurra	Late Triassic	Dockum Group	United States	A coelophysoid theropod. The type species is Lepidus praecisio.	
Morelladon	Gen. et sp. nov.	Valid	Gasulla et al.	Early Cretaceous (probably late Barremian)	Arcillas de Morella Formation	Spain	An ornithopod dinosaur, a basal member of Styracosterna. The type species is Morelladon beltrani.	
Mosaiceratops	Gen. et sp. nov	Valid	Zheng, Jin & Xu	Late Cretaceous (early-middle Turonian—middle Campanian)	Xiaguan Formation	China	A basal neoceratopsian. The type species is Mosaiceratops azumai.	
Nebulasaurus	Gen. et sp. nov	Valid	Xing et al.	Middle Jurassic (Aalenian or Bajocian)	Zhanghe Formation	China	A eusauropod sauropod. The type species is Nebulasaurus taito.	
Padillasaurus	Gen. et sp. nov	Valid	Carballido et al.	Early Cretaceous (Barremian)	Paja Formation	Colombia	A brachiosaurid sauropod. The type species is Padillasaurus leivaensis.	
Probrachylophosaurus	Gen. et sp. nov	Valid	Freedman Fowler & Horner	Late Cretaceous (Campanian)	Judith River Formation	United States	A hadrosaurid. The type species is Probrachylophosaurus bergei.	
Pulanesaura	Gen. et sp. nov	Valid	McPhee et al.	Early Jurassic (probably late Hettangian to Sinemurian)	Upper Elliot Formation	South Africa	A basal sauropod. The type species is Pulanesaura eocollum.	
Qijianglong	Gen. et sp. nov	Valid	Xing et al.	Late Jurassic	Suining Formation	China	A mamenchisaurid sauropod. The type species is Qijianglong guokr.	
Regaliceratops	Gen. et sp. nov	Valid	Brown & Henderson	Late Cretaceous (probably middle Maastrichtian)	St. Mary River Formation	Canada	A chasmosaurine ceratopsid. The type species is Regaliceratops peterhewsi.	
Saurornitholestes sullivani	Sp. nov	Valid	Jasinski	Late Cretaceous (late Campanian)	Kirtland Formation	United States	A member of Dromaeosauridae, a species of Saurornitholestes.	
Sefapanosaurus	Gen. et sp. nov	Valid	Otero et al.	Late Triassic or Early Jurassic	Elliot Formation	South Africa	A non-sauropod sauropodomorph. The type species is Sefapanosaurus zastronensis.	
Sirindhorna	Gen. et sp. nov	Valid	Shibata et al.	Early Cretaceous (Aptian)	Khok Kruat Formation	Thailand	A basal member of Hadrosauroidea. The type species is Sirindhorna khoratensis.	
Ugrunaaluk	Gen. et sp. nov	Disputed	Mori, Druckenmiller & Erickson	Late Cretaceous (early Maastrichtian)	Prince Creek Formation	United States	A saurolophine hadrosaurid. The type species is Ugrunaaluk kuukpikensis. The genus Ugrunaaluk was considered to be a junior synonym of the genus Edmontosaurus by Takasaki et al. (2020).	
Wendiceratops	Gen. et sp. nov.	Valid	Evans & Ryan	Late Cretaceous (Campanian)	Oldman Formation	Canada	A centrosaurine ceratopsid. The type species is Wendiceratops pinhornensis.	
Yi	Gen. et sp. nov	Valid	Xu et al.	Jurassic (Callovian or Oxfordian)	Tiaojishan Formation	China	A scansoriopterygid theropod. The type species is Yi qi.	
Zhenyuanlong	Gen. et sp. nov.	Valid	Lü & Brusatte	Early Cretaceous	Yixian Formation	China	A dromaeosaurid theropod. The type species is Zhenyuanlong suni.	

== Birds ==
=== Research ===
- Balaur bondoc, originally interpreted as a member of Dromaeosauridae, is argued to be a basal member of Avialae by Cau, Brougham and Naish (2015).
- Estimates of likely mass and flight capability of the extinct Chatham duck (Anas chathamica), as indicated by measurements of major bones, are published by Williams (2015).
- New cranial material of the Oligo-Miocene relative of flamingos, Harrisonavis croizeti, is described by Torres et al. (2015).
- New specimens of the Eocene relative of swifts, Scaniacypselus szarskii, are described by Mayr (2015).
- A specimen of a stem-coliiform Masillacolius brevidactylus with preserved skull is described by Mayr (2015).
- A study of the phylogenetic relationships of Psittacopes, Pumiliornis and Morsoravis, indicating their close relationship to the passerines and extinct family Zygodactylidae, is published by Mayr (2015); the author also introduced a new name, Parapasseres, for the clade containing Passeriformes and Zygodactylidae but not Psittacopes.
- A study of preserved specimens of the Puerto Rican conure (previously considered to be an extinct subspecies of the Hispaniolan parakeet) is published by Olson (2015), who raises it to the rank of a separate species Psittacara maugei.
- A Dwarf Emu was found in the Miocene of Alcoota in Central Australia.
- Jones et al. (2015) describe a distal end of the left tibiotarsus of a member of the genus Caracara of uncertain specific assignment from the late Pleistocene of Argentina, estimated to be the largest member of the family Falconidae described thus far.
- A description of the skeletal anatomy of two well-preserved specimens of the dodo is published by Claessens, Meijer and Hume (2015).

=== New taxa ===
Name	Novelty	Status	Authors	Age	Unit	Location	Notes	Images
Aegypius tugarinovi	Sp. nov.	Valid	Manegold & Zelenkov	Early Pliocene, Ruscinian		Moldova	An Old World vulture, Accipitridae, related to the cinereous vulture.	
Alopecoenas norfolkensis	Sp. nov	Valid	Forshaw	Holocene		Australia	A new scientific name for the Norfolk ground dove. The previous name used to refer to this species, Columba norfolciensis Latham (1801), was suppressed by ICZN in 2010.	
Anas kurochkini	Sp. nov.	Valid	Zelenkov & Panteleyev	Late Miocene		Russia	An Anatidae.	
Archaeornithura	Gen. et sp. nov.	Valid	Wang et al.	Hauterivian	Huajiying Formation	China	A Hongshanornithidae. Type species A. meemannae.	
Athene inexpectata	Sp. nov.	Valid	Pavia, Manegold, & Haarhoff	Early Pliocene	Varswater Formation	South Africa	A Strigidae	
Circaetus haemusensis	Sp. nov.	Valid	Boev	Early Pleistocene		Bulgaria	A snake eagle	
Cratoavis	Gen. et sp. nov.	Valid	Carvalho et al.	Aptian	Crato Member, Santana Formation	Brazil	A member of Euenantiornithes of uncertain phylogenetic placement. The type species is C. cearensis.	
Dunhuangia	Gen. et sp. nov.	Valid	Wang et al.	Early Cretaceous	Xiagou Formation	China	A member of Enantiornithes. The type species is D. cuii.	
Eopachypteryx	Gen. et sp. nov.	Valid	Mayr	Eocene	Messel Formation	Germany	A bird of uncertain phylogenetic placement. Type species E. praeterita.	
Feitianius	Gen. et sp. nov	Valid	O'Connor et al.	Early Cretaceous (Aptian)	Xiagou Formation	China	A member of Enantiornithes. The type species is Feitianius paradisi.	
Foshanornis	Gen. et sp. nov.	Valid	Zhao et al.	Early Eocene	Buxin Formation	China	A bird of uncertain phylogenetic placement, possibly a relative of trogons. Type species F. songi.	
Fumicollis	Gen. et sp. nov.	Valid	Bell & Chiappe	Late Cretaceous (late Coniacian—early Campanian)	The Smoky Hill Member of the Niobrara Chalk	United States	A member of Hesperornithiformes. The type species is Fumicollis hoffmani.	
Gallinago azovica	Sp. nov.	Valid	Zelenkov & Panteleyev	Middle Turolian		Russia	A snipe, Scolopacidae.	
Hakawai	Gen. et sp. nov.	Valid	De Pietri et al.	Early Miocene (19–16 Ma)	Bannockburn Formation	New Zealand	A member of Scolopaci of uncertain phylogenetic placement. The type species is Hakawai melvillei.	
Holbotia	Gen. et sp. nov.	Valid	Zelenkov & Averianov	Early Cretaceous		Mongolia	A member of Enantiornithes, probably a relative of Gobipteryx. Type species H. ponomarenkoi.	
Houornis	Gen. et comb. nov.	Valid	Wang & Liu	Early Cretaceous	Jiufotang Formation	China	A member of Enantiornithes of uncertain phylogenetic placement; a new genus for "Cathayornis" caudatus Hou (1997).	
Hypsipetes cowlesi	Sp. nov.	Valid	Hume	Holocene		Rodrigues	A bulbul, Pycnonotidae	
Juehuaornis	Gen. et sp. nov.	Valid	Wang, Wang & Hu	Early Cretaceous	Jiufotang Formation	China	A basal member of Ornithuromorpha. Type species J. zhangi.	
Kuntur	Gen. et sp. nov.	Valid	Stucchi et al.	Late Miocene	Pisco Formation	Peru	A condor. Type species K. cardenasi.	
Lavadytis	Gen. et sp. nov.	Valid	Stidham & Hilton	Miocene (16.1–14.6 Ma)		United States	A member of Anatidae; a member or a relative of members of the subfamily Oxyurinae. The type species is Lavadytis pyrenae.	
Llallawavis	Gen. et sp. nov	Valid	Degrange et al.	Late Pliocene	Playa Los Lobos Allo Formation	Argentina	A mesembriornithine phorusrhacid. Type species L. scagliai.	
Makahala	Gen. et sp. nov.	Valid	Mayr	Latest Eocene or early Oligocene	Makah Formation	United States	A member of Procellariiformes. Type species M. mirae.	
Mangystania	Gen. et sp. nov	Valid	Zvonok, Zelenkov & Danilov	Eocene (Bartonian)	Shorym Formation	Kazakhstan	Possibly a member of Suliformes. The type species is Mangystania humilicristata.	
Miobaptus huzhiricus	Sp. nov	Valid	Zelenkov	Miocene		Russia	A grebe	
Mioporphyrula	Gen. et comb. nov	Valid	Zelenkov in Zelenkov & Kurochkin	Late Miocene		Moldova	A member of Rallidae. A new genus for "Tertiariaporphyrula" lungi Kurochkin & Ganea (1972).	
Mwalau	Gen. et sp. nov.	Valid	Worthy et al.	Holocene		Vanuatu	A megapode. The type species is M. walterlinii.	
Namapsitta	Gen. et sp. nov.	Valid	Mourer-Chauviré, Pickford, & Senut	Middle Eocene		Namibia	A Psittaciformes incertae sedis. Type species N. praeruptorum.	
Nyctisoma	Gen. et sp. nov.	Valid	Elżanowski & Zelenkov	Middle Miocene	Öoshin Formation	Mongolia	An Ardeidae. Type species N. robusta.	
Oligonomus	Gen. et sp. nov.	Valid	De Pietri, Camens, & Worthy	Late Oligocene		Australia	A member of Charadriiformes related to the plains-wanderer. Type species O. milleri.	
Opisthodactylus horacioperezi	Sp. nov.	Valid	Agnolin & Chafrat	Early Miocene	Chichinales Formation	Argentina	A rheid ratite	
Parapengornis	Gen. et sp. nov.	Valid	Hu, O'Connor & Zhou	Early Cretaceous	Jiufotang Formation	China	A member of Enantiornithes, a relative of Pengornis. Type species P. eurycaudatus.	
Patagorhacos	Gen. et sp. nov.	Valid	Agnolin & Chafrat	Early Miocene	Chichinales Formation	Argentina	A member of Phorusrhacidae. Type species P. terrificus.	
Petrosushkinia	Nom. nov	Valid	Zelenkov in Zelenkov & Kurochkin	Late Miocene		Kazakhstan	A member of Falconidae. A replacement name for Sushkinia Tugarinov (1935) (preoccupied).	
Porzana botunensis	Sp. nov.	Valid	Boev	Early Pleistocene		Bulgaria	A member of Rallidae, a species of crake.	
Pterodroma imberi	Sp. nov.	Valid	Tennyson, Cooper & Shepherd	Holocene		New Zealand	A member of Procellariidae, a species of gadfly petrel.	
Pterygornis	Gen. et sp. nov.	Valid	Wang, Hu & Li	Early Cretaceous	Jiufotang Formation	China	A member of Enantiornithes. Type species P. dapingfangensis.	
Rallus adolfocaesaris	Sp. nov.	Valid	Alcover et al.	Holocene		Madeira (Porto Santo Island)	A member of Rallidae, a species of Rallus	
Rallus carvaoensis	Sp. nov.	Valid	Alcover et al.	Holocene		Azores (São Miguel Island)	A member of Rallidae, a species of Rallus	
Rallus lowei	Sp. nov.	Valid	Alcover et al.	Holocene		Madeira (Madeira Island)	A member of Rallidae, a species of Rallus	
Rallus minutus	Sp. nov.	Junior homonym	Alcover et al.	Holocene		Azores (São Jorge Island)	A member of Rallidae, a species of Rallus. The specific name is a junior homonym of Rallus minutus Pallas (1776), Rallus minutus Gmelin (1789) and Rallus minutus Forster (1844). Alcover et al. (2016) coined a replacement name Rallus nanus.	
Rallus montivagorum	Sp. nov.	Valid	Alcover et al.	Holocene		Azores (Pico Island)	A member of Rallidae, a species of Rallus	
Rhamphastosula aguirrei	Sp. nov.	Valid	Stucchi, Varas-Malca & Urbina-Schmitt	Miocene	Pisco Formation	Peru	A member of Sulidae, a species of Rhamphastosula.	
Scolopax brachycarpa	Sp. nov.	Valid	Takano & Steadman	Late Holocene		Haiti	A woodcock.	
Scopelortyx	Gen. nov. et Sp. nov.	Valid	Mourer-Chauviré, Pickford, & Senut	Middle Eocene		Namibia	A Paraortygidae, Galliformes. Type species S. klinghardtensis.	
Shiriyanetta	Gen. et sp. nov.	Valid	Watanabe & Matsuoka	Pleistocene		Japan	A duck. The type species is Shiriyanetta hasegawai.	
Spheniscus anglicus	Sp. nov.	Valid	Benson	Late Miocene	Bahía Inglesa Formation	Chile	A banded penguin.	
Stemec	Gen. et sp. nov.	Valid	Kaiser, Watanabe & Johns	Late Oligocene	Sooke Formation	Canada	A member of Plotopteridae. The type species is Stemec suntokum.	
Sula brandi	Sp. nov.	Valid	Stucchi, Varas-Malca & Urbina-Schmitt	Miocene	Pisco Formation	Peru	A booby.	
Sula figueroae	Sp. nov.	Valid	Stucchi, Varas-Malca & Urbina-Schmitt	Miocene	Pisco Formation	Peru	A booby.	
Tyto cravesae	Sp. nov.	Valid	Suárez & Olson	Quaternary (probably late Pleistocene)		Cuba	A barn-owl, a species of Tyto.	
Tyto richae	Sp. nov	Valid	Pavia, Manegold, & Haarhoff	Early Pliocene	Varswater Formation	South Africa	A Tytonidae barn-owl.	
Yuanjiawaornis	Gen. et sp. nov.	Valid	Hu et al.	Early Cretaceous	Jiufotang Formation	China	A member of Enantiornithes. Type species Yuanjiawaornis viriosus.	

== Pterosaurs ==
=== Research ===
- A study on the terrestrial locomotion of non-pterodactyloid pterosaurs is published by Witton (2015).
- A specimen of Rhamphorhynchus muensteri with preserved soft tissues or impressions of soft tissues, stomach contents and possibly a coprolite is described by Hone et al. (2015).
- Eleutério et al. (2015) study the bone microstructure characterization of two pterosaurs belonging to the group Anhangueria.
- The paleoenvironments of azhdarchid pterosaurs from the Late Cretaceous of Kazakhstan are studied by Averianov et al. (2015).
- Martill et al. (2015) describe a jaw bone attributed to the mid-Cretaceous pterosaur species Alanqa saharica from the Kem Kem beds of Morocco.

=== New taxa ===
Name	Novelty	Status	Authors	Age	Unit	Location	Notes	Images
Arcticodactylus	Gen. et comb. nov	Valid	Kellner	Late Triassic (?Norian-Rhaetian)	Fleming Fjord Formation	Greenland	A non-pterodactyloid pterosaur of uncertain phylogenetic placement; a new genus for "Eudimorphodon" cromptonellus Jenkins et al. (2001).	
Austriadraco	Gen. et sp. nov	Valid	Kellner	Late Triassic (late Norian)	Seefeld Formation	Austria	A non-pterodactyloid pterosaur of uncertain phylogenetic placement. The type species is Austriadraco dallavecchiai.	
Banguela	Gen. et sp. nov	Disputed	Headden & Campos	Early Cretaceous	Romualdo Formation	Brazil	The type species is Banguela oberlii. Originally described as a dsungaripterid; Pêgas, Costa & Kellner (2018) considered the genus Banguela to be a junior synonym of the genus Thalassodromeus, and transferred the species B. oberlii to the latter genus.	
Bergamodactylus	Gen. et sp. nov	Disputed	Kellner	Late Triassic (Alaunian)	Calcari di Zorzino Formation	Italy	Originally interpreted as a relative of Campylognathoides. The type species is Bergamodactylus wildi. Dalla Vecchia (2018) considers B. wildi to be a junior synonym of Carniadactylus rosenfeldi.	
Cimoliopterus dunni	Sp. nov	Valid	Myers	Late Cretaceous (late Cenomanian)	Britton Formation	United States	A member of Pterodactyloidea, probably a pteranodontoid; a species of Cimoliopterus.	
Daohugoupterus	Gen. et sp. nov	Valid	Cheng et al.	Late Jurassic	Daohugou Beds	China	A non-pterodactyloid pterosaur. The type species is Daohugoupterus delicatus.	
Linlongopterus	Gen. et sp. nov	Valid	Rodrigues et al.	Early Cretaceous (Aptian)	Jiufotang Formation	China	A member of Pteranodontoidea, possibly related to anhanguerians. The type species is Linlongopterus jennyae.	
Orientognathus	Gen. et sp. nov	Valid	Lü et al.	Late Jurassic	Tuchengzi Formation	China	A rhamphorhynchid. The type species is Orientognathus chaoyngensis.	
Rhamphorhynchus etchesi	Sp. nov	Valid	O'Sullivan & Martill	Late Jurassic	Kimmeridge Clay Formation	United Kingdom	A species of Rhamphorhynchus.	
