= Mayoan =

The Mayoan (Spanish: Mayoense) age is a period of geologic time from 11.8 to 10 Ma, within the Middle to Late Miocene epoch of the Neogene, used more specifically within the SALMA classification in South America. It follows the Laventan and precedes the Chasicoan age.

== Etymology ==
The age is named after the Río Mayo Formation in the Golfo San Jorge Basin of Patagonia, Argentina.

== Formations ==
Locations of Mayoan formations

Formation bold is type	Country	Basin	Notes
Río Mayo Formation	Argentina	Golfo San Jorge Basin	
Coquimbo Formation	Chile	Tongoy Bay	
Gran Bajo del Gualicho Formation	Argentina	Colorado Basin	
Huaylas Formation	Chile	Parinacota Province	
Mauri Formation	Bolivia	Altiplano Basin	
Navidad Formation	Chile	Chilean Coast Range	
Paraná Formation	Argentina	Paraná Basin	
Pebas Formation	Brazil; Colombia; Ecuador; Peru	Amazon Basin	
Pisco Formation	Peru	Pisco Basin	
Puerto Madryn Formation	Argentina	Valdés Basin	
Urumaco Formation	Venezuela	Falcón Basin	
Yecua Formation	Bolivia	Paraná Basin	

== Fossil content ==
Group	Fossils	Formation	Notes
Mammals	Megathericulus patagonicus	Río Mayo	
Mammals	Caraguatypotherium munozi, Epipeltephilus caraguensis	Huaylas	
Mammals	Brujadelphis ankylorostris	Pisco	
Mammals	Cardiatherium patagonicum, Kawas benegasorum, Notoziphius bruneti, Scirrotherium carinatum, Lagostomus (Lagostomopsis) sp., Dolichotinae indet., Macraucheniidae indet., Mylodontinae indet., Neuryurini indet., Palaehoplophorini indet.	Puerto; Madryn	
Mammals	cf. Theosodon sp.	Yecua	
Birds	Kuntur cardenasi, Ramphastosula aguirrei, Sula brandi, S. figueroae	Pisco	
Birds	Madrynornis mirandus, Palaeospheniscus bergi, Accipitridae indet., Dendrocygninae indet., Psilopteridae indet.	Puerto; Madryn	
Reptiles	Mourasuchus sp., Pleurodira indet.	Yecua	
Fishes	Cosmopolitodus hastalis	Coquimbo	
Fishes	Loricariidae indet., Percomorpha indet., Siluriformes indet.	Puerto; Madryn	
Fishes	cf. Ariidae indet., Teleostei indet.	Yecua	
