= Arkady Tugarinov =

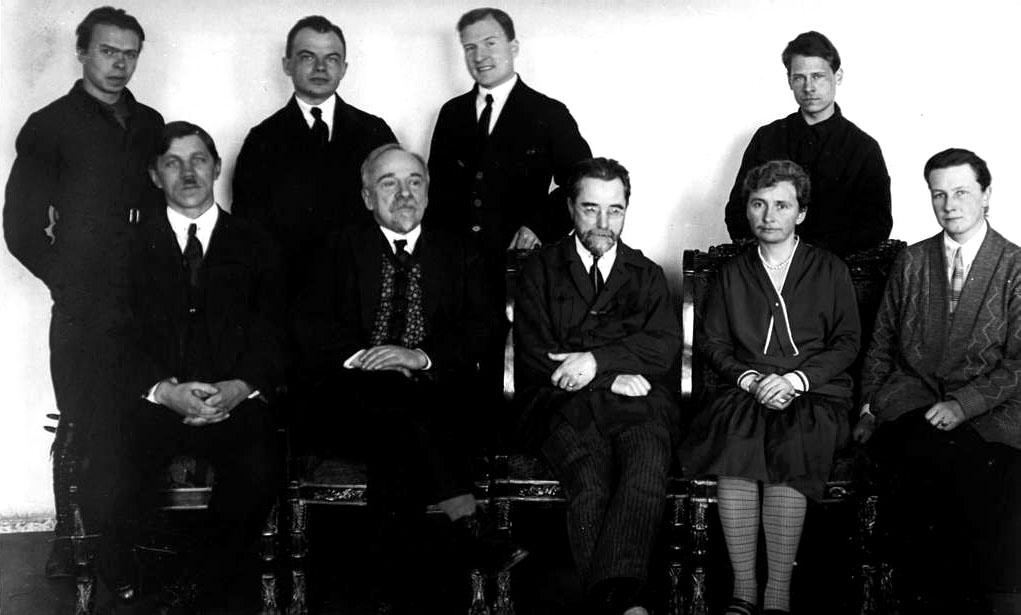
Tugarinov, seated third from left, between P. Sushkin and his wife, along with other ornithologists in 1924

Arkady Yakovlevich Tugarinov (Russian: Аркадий Яковлевич Тугаринов; 9 November 1880 – 8 July 1948) was a Russian and Soviet ornithologist who studied the birds of Siberia. He examined bird distributions in the light of climatic history and is considered a pioneer of paleornithology. He also contributed to anthropology through his discovery of the so-called "Andronovo culture".

== Biography ==
Tugarinov was born in Saratov, where his father was a civil servant. While at school he collected plants and made a herbarium and joined a group of Saratov naturalists at the age of seventeen. He worked in a local museum and collected birds from the Astrakhan and Sarepta for the museum. He was influenced by Boris Keller (1874-1945). He went to Kazan University, and attended the meeting of the All-Russian Union of Naturalists in 1901 at St. Petersburg. In 1905 he moved to work at the Central Siberian Regional Museum as a curator. He explored the Yenisei region from Mongolia to the Arctic Ocean, taking an interest in archaeology of the region as well. From 1907 he headed the Geographic Society of Krasnoyarsk. In 1914, Tugarinov discovered the remains of an ancient culture near Andronovo, which was later called the Andronovo Culture. In 1926 he began to collaborate with Petr Sushkin and in 1926 and 1928 he took part in expeditions to Mongolia. In 1934-1937 he explored the Caspian Sea region and Transcaucasia in collaboration with Elizabeth Kozlova. He attempted to explain bird distributions using a reconstruction of the Pliocene of Siberia. He described several new subspecies of birds and several fossil bird species. He wrote a book on the birds and mammals of Yakutia along with N.N. Smirnov and A.I. Ivanov. He also collaborated on the birds of the USSR series, contributing to the volumes on waterbirds. He received a doctorate in 1934 and in 1940 he succeeded P.V. Serebrowsky at the Zoological Institute of the Academy of Sciences. He died in Leningrad. Several taxa have been named after him including Eobalearica tugarinovi, Tertiaria porphyrula tugarinovi, Aegypius tugarinovi, and Pica pica tugarinovi.
