= Lichen community =

Recurring assemblage of lichen species and its classification in vegetation science

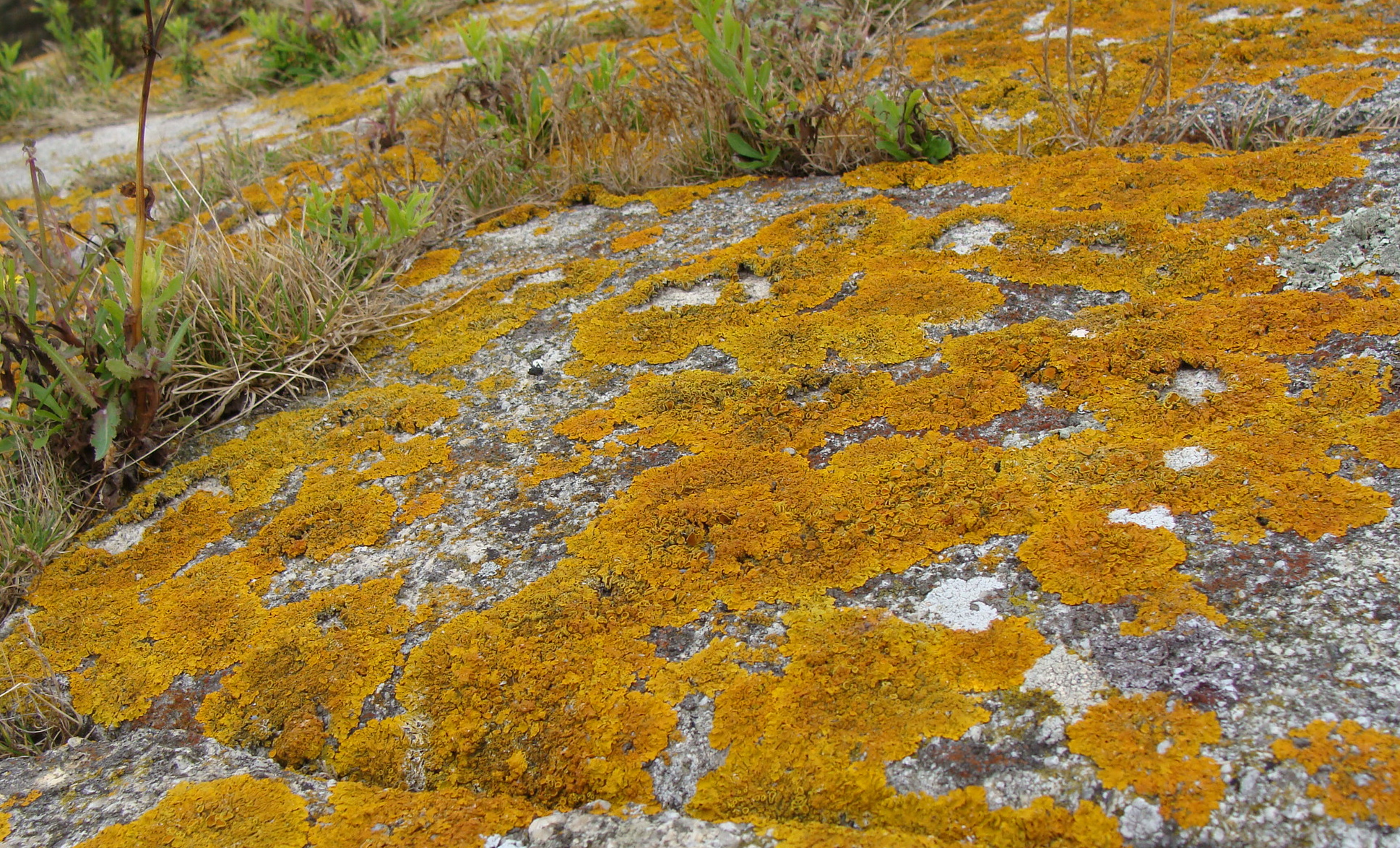
Xanthoria parietina forming part of a rock-dwelling lichen community on granite in Brittany, France

A lichen community is a group of lichen species that consistently grow together in response to specific environmental conditions. In general ecology, the term refers to any recurring assemblage occupying similar substrates, while in vegetation science (phytosociology), these assemblages are classified into formal, named types called syntaxa, such as associations and alliances.

Because lichens occupy very small areas, such as a single patch of bark or a stone, their study has played a prominent role in debates over whether vegetation units should represent whole plant communities or smaller, substrate-bound partial communities (synusiae). These assemblages are not static; they change over time through succession as new species colonize a surface and compete for space and light.

The formal syntaxonomic tradition is strongest in Europe, especially in the Braun–Blanquet school, where bryophyte- and lichen-dominated vegetation has been incorporated into continent-wide classification systems. North American lichen ecology has more often relied on gradient analysis and ordination rather than formal naming, though community composition is widely used in biomonitoring on both continents.

Lichen communities are important in conservation and environmental assessment because their composition responds strongly to substrate chemistry, air quality, moisture regime and habitat continuity. Named assemblages such as the epiphytic Lobarion have also been used in conservation evaluation and habitat interpretation. Beyond their species composition, modern research also focuses on the functional traits of these communities, such as growth forms and chemical properties, which influence ecosystem processes like nutrient cycling.

== Definition and scope ==
Ecologists commonly use the term lichen community for recognizable assemblages of lichens that recur on a given substrate or under a given set of environmental conditions. Formal vegetation science uses narrower terms. Lichen vegetation treats the lichen layer as vegetation in its own right, while lichen phytosociology applies relevé-based classification to that vegetation and names the resulting formal community types, or syntaxa, under the International Code of Phytosociological Nomenclature (ICPN). A syntaxon is an abstract type, not the individual stand or patch of lichen growth recorded on a particular tree trunk, rock face or soil surface. Barkman also argued that the term "synusia" is best reserved for the abstract unit rather than the concrete patch seen in the field. In that usage, the actual lichen patch on a trunk, rock or soil surface is a concrete society or stand, while the synusia is the generalized type abstracted from comparable societies. This divergence was indicative of a broader contrast in scientific tradition. While continental Europe favoured a typological approach (grouping vegetation into fixed types), North American lichenology relied more on an individualistic approach, viewing communities as shifting along environmental gradients.

Scale is unusually important in lichen studies. Micro-communities are very small, substrate-bound units, and in formal literature they are often interpreted as synusiae or, in more structural terminology, merocoenoses—partial communities within a wider phytocoenosis—rather than as complete site-level vegetation. More exact synusial definitions make a further distinction that is worth stating explicitly. In Barkman's formulation, a synusia is not simply any substrate-bound patch of vegetation. It is a structural part of a larger plant community that occupies a particular microhabitat but also shares the same layer, broadly similar seasonality, and a similar way of using that habitat. For example, a single tree trunk may count as one epiphytic micro-community, but within it one can distinguish several synusiae. These might include a crustose-lichen society on bark plateaux, a different epiphytic society in bark fissures, and a fruticose lichen layer overlying a foliose or crustose one. Set against a whole phytocoenosis, the scale difference can be illustrated by an example: an entire forest stand is a phytocoenosis, the trunk-dwelling lichen vegetation within it forms one or more epiphytic synusiae, and the actual patch on a particular trunk is a concrete stand or society from which a synusia may be abstracted. Barkman's use of these terms was mainly structural, concerned with how partial communities are delimited within a vegetation stand. Later critiques, especially by Berg and co-authors, focused more on a classificatory problem: whether such partial communities should occupy the same formal hierarchy as whole phytocoenoses.

== History ==
Modern lichen phytosociology developed as Braun-Blanquet methods for classifying vascular-plant vegetation were extended to lichen assemblages on bark and rock, a typological approach that contrasted with the North American tendency to treat lichen communities as shifting along environmental gradients rather than as fixed types. Pier Luigi Nimis traced its beginnings to work in the 1920s by Eduard Frey, Antonín Hilitzer and Fritz Ochsner, who applied phytosociological ideas to lichen assemblages on bark and rock. Ochsner's 1928 treatment of epiphytic (bark-dwelling) vegetation, which included units such as the Lobarion and Xanthorion, became especially influential in later bark-community studies. Another milestone was Gustaf Einar Du Rietz's 1945 contrast between acidophytic communities of nutrient-poor bark and richer-bark epiphytic communities, a framework that shaped later discussion of bark chemistry and host trees.

The first comprehensive classification of Central European lichen communities was Oscar Klement's Prodromus der mitteleuropäischen Flechtengesellschaften ('Prodromus of Central European lichen communities', 1955). Jan J. Barkman's Phytosociology and Ecology of Cryptogamic Epiphytes (1958) then became the foundational monograph of cryptogamic epiphyte vegetation in Europe. British lichenologists adopted the continental framework more pragmatically. James, Hawksworth and Rose's 1977 conspectus accepted the usefulness of named communities but cautioned against forcing lichen variation into a rigid proliferation of narrowly delimited associations. Nimis's 1991 review argued that numerical methods should play a larger part in lichen community studies, while also warning against inflation of community names. The main modern continental synthesis is the EuroVegChecklist of 2016, which placed bryophyte- and lichen-dominated vegetation into a pan-European framework.

== Concepts and methods ==
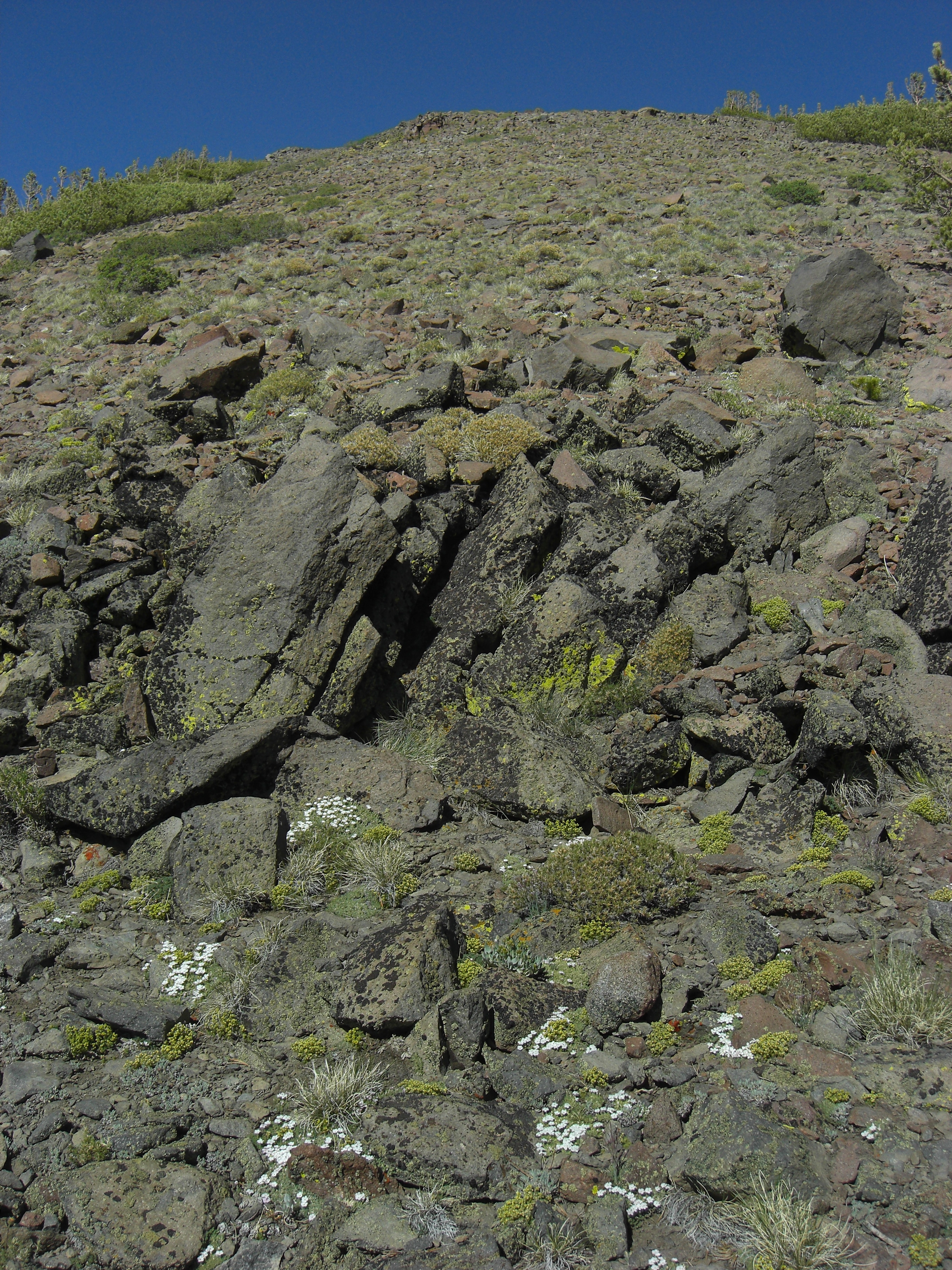
A rock-dwelling alpine zone lichen community in Mount Rose, Nevada, USA

Phytosociological studies usually begin with a relevé, a plot record of the species present and their abundance in a homogeneous stand. Lichen relevés are typically much smaller than plots used for vascular plant vegetation, because many communities are tied to a patch of bark, a rock face or a small soil crust. A survey of more than 11,000 bryophyte and lichen relevés found median plot sizes around 0.04–0.09 m^{2} (roughly the size of a sheet of paper) for bark-, rock-, soil- and wood-dwelling communities. This scale difference is one reason many lichen syntaxa are treated as micro-communities or synusiae rather than as whole-site communities. Barkman distinguished between two legitimate sampling aims in epiphyte studies. A plot meant to characterize a forest stand by its epiphytes should take all trees into account, including those lacking epiphytes, whereas a study aimed at describing epiphytic communities themselves should use smaller and more homogeneous samples from comparable parts of the bark surface. Some authors have argued more strongly that plots below 1 m^{2} usually represent synusiae or incomplete phytocoenoses rather than full stand-level communities, though that is a methodological position rather than a rule of the nomenclatural code.

Classical Braun–Blanquet practice distinguishes communities by their overall floristic composition and by diagnostic or characteristic species. Constancy is an internal frequency measure, recording how often a species appears within the samples of one community type, whereas fidelity is a comparative measure, recording how strongly that species is concentrated in one type rather than others. Modern vegetation science often estimates fidelity with statistics such as the phi coefficient (a correlation measure ranging from −1 to +1) and uses the broader term diagnostic species for taxa that help separate one unit from another.

Traditional lichen phytosociology often used preferential sampling, in which experts selected stands judged to be typical and homogeneous, rather than random or systematic plots. Supporters saw this as a practical way to capture recognizable community nodes, but critics argued that it made later comparison and synthesis more difficult. Numerical classification and ordination have consequently become more important, especially in large monitoring programmes and in traditions outside Europe. Large survey reports have also used TWINSPAN and related multivariate methods to analyse lichen and bryophyte–lichen plot data. A numerical study of epiphytic lichen vegetation in Tasmanian cool temperate rainforest similarly showed that unconstrained ordination could recover several partly independent gradients in community composition. The main gradients related to host-tree age and bark texture, substrate wetness, and microclimatic constancy.

== Syntaxonomy and nomenclature ==
The ICPN governs the formal naming of lichen syntaxa in the same way that it governs other vegetation syntaxa. The standard ranks are association, alliance, order and class, conventionally marked by the endings -etum, -ion, -etalia and -etea.

Rank	Standard ending	Example	Typical substrate / scale
Association	-etum	Parmelietum carporrhizantis	Bark (corticolous); an association-level unit
Alliance	-ion	Lobarion pulmonariae	Bark of old broadleaves; a group of related epiphytic associations
Order	-etalia	Peltigeretalia	Ground vegetation; a broader terricolous grouping
Class	-etea	Rhizocarpetea geographici	Siliceous rock; a broad substrate-defined class

Under modern ICPN rules, valid publication also requires a nomenclatural type, usually a designated type relevé (a designated reference sample plot). As a result, some older lichen and bryophyte–lichen names have later been validated or typified under current standards. Older cryptogam literature sometimes used alternative names such as union, federatio, ordulus and classicula for these ranks, but those terms are now obsolete.

The main conceptual tension appears in the code itself. Its definition of syntaxa is centred on phytocoenoses, yet it also allows cryptogamic microcoenoses and synusiae to be treated as syntaxa even when they do not correspond to full phytocoenoses. Berg and co-authors argued that vegetation classification becomes logically inconsistent when whole plant communities and their parts are placed in the same hierarchy; epiphytic lichen assemblages on bark, for example, are not equivalent in scale to the forest communities that contain them. European practice has nevertheless remained pragmatic, and the EuroVegChecklist placed bryophyte- and lichen-dominated vegetation in a separate continental system of 27 classes, 53 orders and 137 alliances. The result is a working system that is widely used, even while its theoretical basis remains debated.

== Major types ==
Most formal systems organize lichen communities first by substrate, which is why bark-, rock- and soil-dwelling assemblages recur as the main categories in both ecological and syntaxonomic treatments. Epiphytic communities on bark and wood are the classical terrain of lichen phytosociology. Frequently cited alliances include the old-forest Lobarion pulmonariae of humid broadleaf woodland, the smooth-bark crustose Graphidion scriptae of sheltered damp sites, the fruticose Usneion barbatae of clean-air canopy and branch habitats, and the nutrient-enriched Xanthorion parietinae of bark and rock exposed to eutrophication or dust. These communities vary with bark chemistry, bark texture, moisture, light and woodland continuity. Barkman also cautioned against treating epiphytic lichen communities as simple reflections of forest syntaxa. Some epiphytic units are more closely tied to particular host trees, others to broader forest associations or alliances, and complete one-to-one correspondence across their whole range is unusual and often only local.

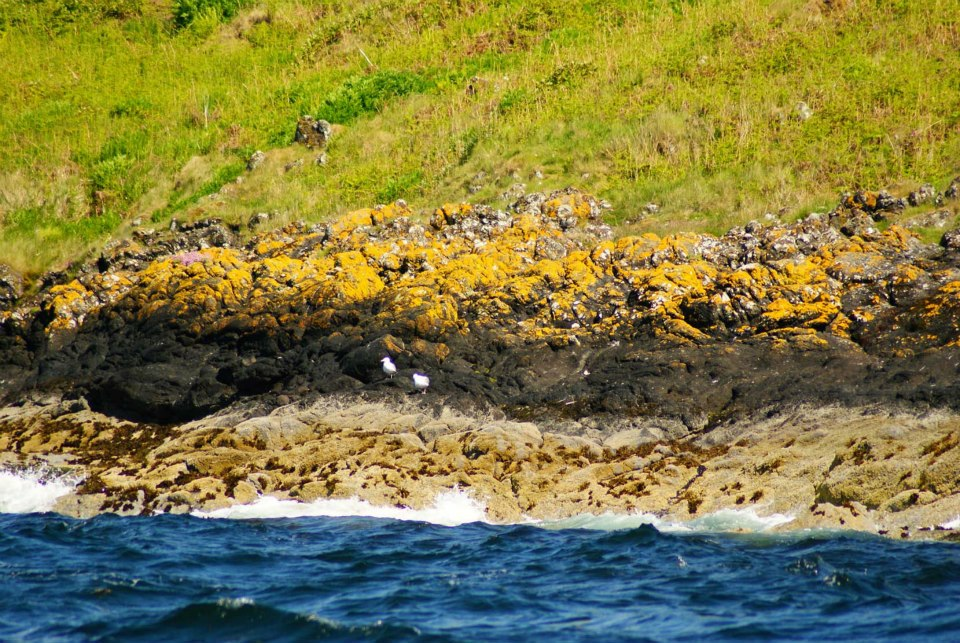
Intertidal zonation of lichen communities on coastal rocks on Great Cumbrae, Scotland; the black littoral belt is characteristic of maritime lichen vegetation in the upper shore zone

Saxicolous, or rock-dwelling, communities are usually separated first by substrate chemistry and then by exposure. Siliceous-rock vegetation has often been classified in or near Rhizocarpetea geographici, whereas calcareous-rock communities have been treated in Verrucarietea nigrescentis and related units. Maritime rock adds a distinct salt spray zonation, including the conspicuous black band classically associated with Hydropunctaria maura on the upper shore.

Terricolous (ground-dwelling) communities occupy heaths, dunes, open grasslands, tundra, alpine ground and other habitats with shallow or unstable soils. In drylands, polar regions, high mountains and other open habitats, many terricolous assemblages take the form of biological soil crusts (biocrusts), in which lichens may be dominant and can influence soil stability, water relations and nutrient cycling.

The alliance Cladonion sylvaticae covers reindeer lichen-rich communities on acidic, nutrient-poor ground, while arctic and alpine terricolous vegetation has often been treated separately because of its distinctive ecology and biogeography. In the boreal and hemiarctic zones, open dry lichen woodlands on acidic sandy soils are often dominated by a small set of fruticose reindeer lichens and can be remarkably homogeneous in ground-layer composition across the circumpolar north, even where the tree and vascular plant flora varies geographically. Many ground communities are mixed bryophyte–lichen assemblages rather than purely lichenic stands, a pattern evident in European systems that classify bryophyte- and lichen-dominated vegetation together. Tropical epiphyllous, or foliicolous, communities on living leaves form another distinctive type; they can be extraordinarily species-rich, sometimes harbouring dozens of lichen species on a single leaf, but they have been less fully integrated into formal syntaxonomy than European bark, rock and soil vegetation. Across all of these habitats, the most broadly established stable units tend to be broad alliances or classes rather than narrow local associations.

== Ecology ==
=== Environmental controls ===
Across substrates, lichen community composition responds strongly to chemistry, moisture, light, exposure, surface texture and stability. Bark pH and nutrient status, bark roughness, water-holding capacity and host-tree identity are especially important for epiphytic assemblages, while rock communities track mineral composition, aspect, salt spray and disturbance. These recurring controls explain why the literature usually organizes lichen communities by substrate before anything else.

The environmental correlates of community composition also shift with spatial scale. North American studies of forest macrolichen communities found that climate, geography and pollution are more prominent at broad regional scales, whereas stand age and tree composition become more important locally. The same work cautioned that most species- and guild-level indicator relationships are context-dependent and should not be generalized beyond the scale at which they were observed. Ecophysiological research has further emphasized that climate effects on lichens are mediated chiefly through thallus water balance, so atmospheric drying demand (vapour-pressure deficit) may be more informative than precipitation totals alone when explaining community change.

=== Functional traits ===
Differences among lichen communities are not only compositional but also functional. Variation in growth form, photobiont type, water-holding capacity, nutrient status and secondary chemistry can affect nutrient capture, decomposition, consumer assemblages and plant establishment. Trait-based work has increasingly treated these attributes as both response traits, which help explain community assembly along environmental gradients, and effect traits, which link lichen community composition to ecosystem processes and services. Reviewers have also pointed to unresolved problems of trait definition, measurement and comparability across regions and studies, however, so generalizations remain tentative.

=== Succession ===
Succession is often conspicuous in lichen communities because lichens colonize newly exposed bark, wood, rock and soil. Ground communities in taiga, tundra and glacier forelands may show prolonged sequences of species accumulation and replacement, while epiphytic communities depend strongly on substrate age and woodland continuity. Successional patterns in lichen vegetation are, however, often less directional than in higher-plant communities. Lawrey's review concluded that many lichen communities are shaped more by the addition of new colonists than by consistent competitive replacement of earlier species. Lichen cover can also alter later community development by either facilitating or inhibiting vascular plants: some lichens increase nutrient availability and weathering during early succession, whereas mat-forming terricolous lichens may suppress seedling emergence by shading the surface, conserving low-nutrient conditions, or physically impeding contact between seeds and soil.

=== Competition and coexistence ===
Competition for space and light does occur where lichen thalli (lichen bodies) meet, but community patterns also reflect dispersal, disturbance history and other environmental filters. Contact between crustose lichens does not always end in simple exclusion. Detailed study of British saxicolous communities showed that many encounters produce stable boundary conditions, while older mosaics may persist through senescence and recolonization of internal gaps, creating a dynamic equilibrium rather than a single replacement sequence. The balance between environmental filtering and direct species interactions also appears to shift along climatic gradients. In drier and more stressful settings, epiphytic assemblages tend to become more functionally and phylogenetically clustered—dominated by species with similar traits—whereas in more favourable settings, coexisting species tend to be more dissimilar, suggesting that competition rather than environmental stress is the stronger structuring force.

== Conservation and practical use ==
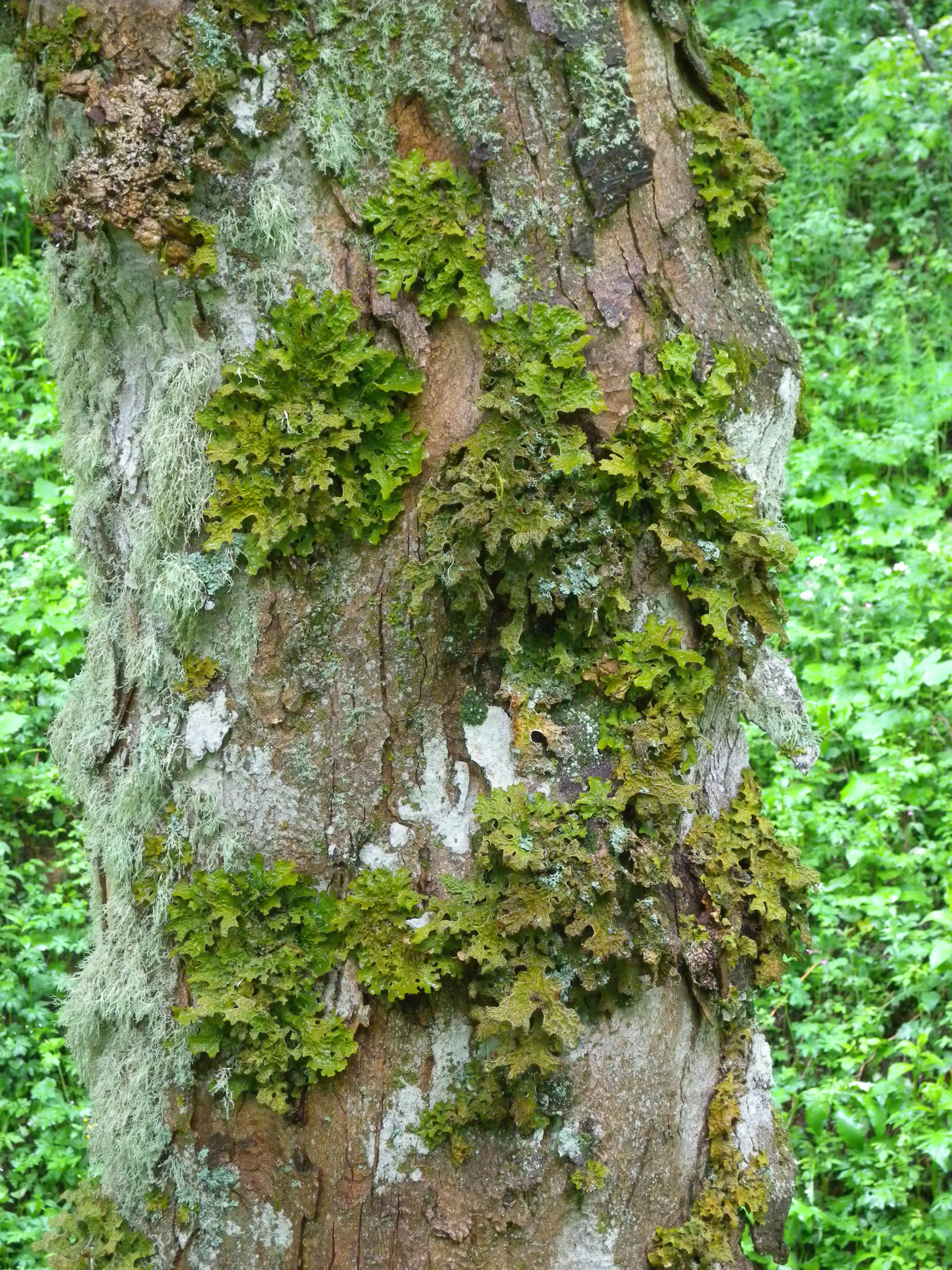
Lobaria pulmonaria on sycamore maple (Acer pseudoplatanus) in Chasseral, Switzerland. The species gives its name to the epiphytic alliance Lobarion pulmonariae, regarded as a late-successional lichen community on mature hardwood trees in old forests across Europe.

Because lichens are highly sensitive to atmospheric chemistry and habitat continuity, community composition has long been used in bioindication. The 1970 Hawksworth–Rose scale used epiphytic assemblages to estimate sulphur dioxide pollution in England and Wales. Francis Rose's 1976 woodland indicator work then linked particular epiphytic communities and species combinations to long ecological continuity, and later British workers turned this into explicit continuity indices: scoring tools that use indicator lists to grade woodland sites for their epiphytic lichen interest, refined for Britain and Ireland by Coppins and Coppins. In Britain, these continuity indices grade woodland sites by their epiphytic lichen interest, using indicator-species lists drawn from old-growth and ancient-woodland epiphytes; they are intended as a broad-brush assessment rather than an infallible test of antiquity. The indices can mislead, however, because pollution and past management—especially clear-felling or heavy coppicing, which removes lichens with the timber—can sharply reduce epiphytic assemblages even on historically ancient sites, and recolonization is often dominated by widespread species rather than old-woodland specialists.

In mature Alpine spruce forests, tree-level lichen richness and community composition both changed with tree age and size, and over-mature trees supported a distinct assemblage that included nationally rare and calicioid species; the retention of over-mature trees was therefore recommended as a practical measure for lichen conservation in managed forests and protected areas. In Estonian wooded meadows, abandonment of traditional management and the resulting increase in canopy cover were found to shift epiphytic lichen communities away from the species-rich assemblages of semi-open stands toward species-poor communities characteristic of secondary forest, and the authors concluded that conserving these communities depends on retaining large old deciduous trees of several species while maintaining a semi-open stand structure. Quantitative work in upland Aberdeenshire confirmed that lichen communities track land-use intensity across multiple substrates: native pinewoods supported species-rich epiphytic assemblages with continuity indicators and no nitrophytes, whereas intensive farmland had epiphytes poor in acidophytes and richer in nitrophytes; in treeless or sparsely wooded landscapes, saxicolous communities and nitrophyte indicators can therefore also help assess agricultural intensification. Experimental work in boreal spruce forest has also shown that added nitrogen alone can shift epiphytic lichen community composition and reduce species richness. Changes were detectable even at 6 kg N ha−1 yr−1, with different species showing different optima and decline thresholds; this helps explain why lichen communities are such sensitive indicators of nitrogen deposition. Work in the Pacific Northwest has also explored continuous conservation indices that assign sites a graded score along a spectrum of conservation value rather than classifying them only as above or below a fixed threshold.

Modern monitoring programmes have standardized some of these uses. ICP Forests samples epiphytic lichen diversity on fixed forest plots across Europe, while the United States Forest Service FIA programme maintains a large database of epiphytic macrolichen communities for forest health and environmental assessment. In North America, comparable practice has more often taken the form of standardized lichen-community indicators embedded in forest-monitoring programmes than of formal syntaxonomic schemes. German VDI 3957 standards similarly use mapped epiphytic lichen assemblages in biomonitoring, especially for local climate-change assessment. In Norwegian subalpine birch forests, for example, repeated monitoring over 15 years showed that, the widespread generalist Hypogymnia physodes increased at all sites, while the subalpine birch-forest specialist Melanohalea olivacea declined, and the greatest compositional shifts occurred where sulphur deposition decreased most.

Formal community concepts also enter conservation practice unevenly. British surveys have classified saxicolous and epiphytic lichen-rich habitats, and a Welsh conservation review treated the Lobarion and metallophyte lichens as priority lichen communities while also warning that the delimitation of such communities can be controversial.

At European scale, the EuroVegChecklist, the EUNIS habitat expert system and FloraVeg.EU link syntaxa, habitat definitions and distribution data. Broader vegetation-plot infrastructures such as the European Vegetation Archive (EVA) and the global sPlot database provide a wider context for cross-regional community analysis. These tools are more developed for Europe and for general vegetation science than for global lichen syntaxonomy as a whole.

== Limitations and criticisms ==
The central criticism of lichen phytosociology is that many of its named units are partial communities rather than complete plant communities. When bark, rock or soil synusiae are ranked beside forests, grasslands or mires, critics argue, the hierarchy becomes ecologically artificial. The code permits this practice, but it does not remove the conceptual tension. In practice, authors have not always kept terms such as synusia, micro-community and lichen community sharply separate, which has added a further layer of terminological looseness to the field. James and colleagues also urged caution against over-rigid community delimitation, and Nimis later warned against inflation of community names through excessive splitting of local associations.

Other limitations are more practical. Very small plots complicate comparison with stand-level vegetation data. Rapid taxonomic change in lichens can destabilize diagnostic-species lists and the older concept of character species; for example, species once grouped broadly under Caloplaca have been redistributed among several genera as molecular evidence has accumulated, leaving older community descriptions with character species recorded under names that no longer match current taxonomy. The formal syntaxonomic tradition is also strongly European; outside Europe, lichen communities are more often treated as ecological indicators or assemblages analysed by ordination than as ICPN-governed syntaxa. Even outside the syntaxonomic tradition, challenges remain: more recent trait-based approaches have broadened lichen community ecology, but reviewers have also pointed to unresolved problems of trait definition, measurement, comparability and scale, which can complicate generalization across regions and studies.

== See also ==
- Josias Braun-Blanquet
- Lichen biogeography
- British National Vegetation Classification
- U.S. National Vegetation Classification
