= Hakawai =

Hakawai can refer to:

- Hakawai (genus), an extinct monotypic genus of prehistoric birds with the species Hakawai melvillei
- Hakawai (mythology), to the New Zealand Māori people, a mythological bird that was sometimes heard but not usually seen. It is now associated with the nocturnal aerial displays made by Coenocorypha snipe.
