= Saxicolous lichen =

Type of lichen that grows on rocks

A saxicolous lichen is a lichen that grows on rock. The prefix "sax" from the Latin saxum means "rock" or "stone".

== Characteristics ==
Saxicolous lichens exhibit very slow growth rates. They may develop on rock substrates for long periods of time, given the absence of external disturbances. The importance of the mineral composition of the rock substrate, as well as the elemental geochemistry is also important to the distribution of saxicolous lichens, but the relationship between the substrate influence on lichens, either chemical or textural, is still obscure.

Communities of saxicolous lichens are often species-rich in terms of number.
