= Boris Keller =

Russian botanist (1874–1945)

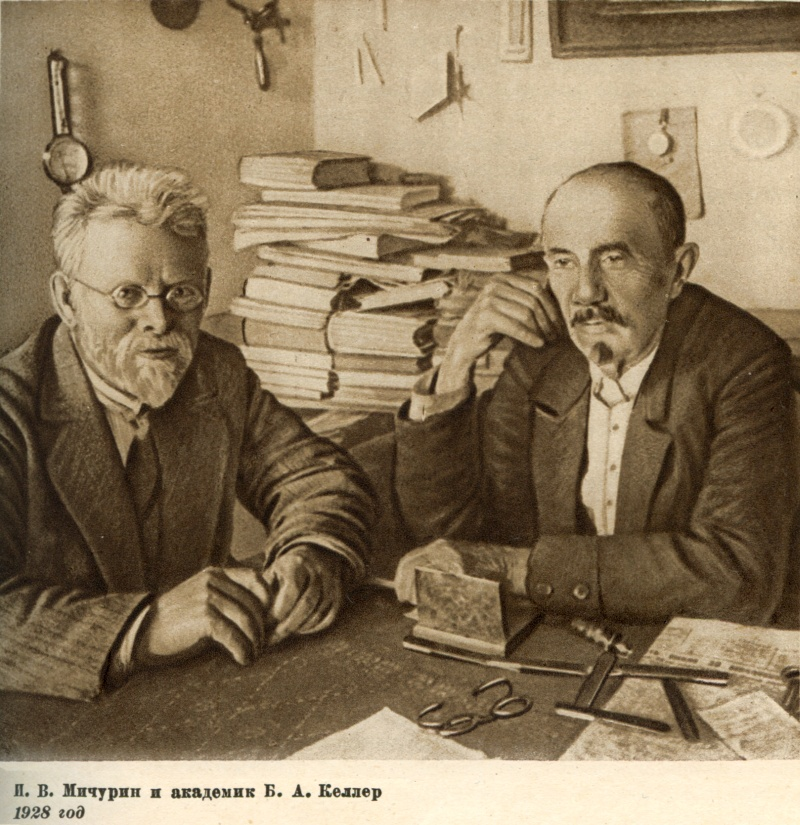
Michurin and Keller in 1928

Boris Aleksandrovich Keller (Russian: Борис Александрович Келлер; 28 August 1874 – 29 October 1945) was a Russian and Soviet biologist and a pioneer of plant ecology in the Soviet Union. Specializing in the vegetational ecology of the semi-arid steppe regions, he introduced the idea of vegetation complexes which are now termed as synusia in plant ecology. He served as the first director of the Komarov Botanical Institute.

== Biography ==
Keller was born in Saint Petersburg in the Russian Empire, but grew up in Volsk and Saratov where his father was a physician. He graduated from the Saratov Gymnasium in 1892 with a gold medal and joined Moscow University to study medicine. He however failed in 1892–1993 and moved to the natural sciences under Professor Ivan Nikolaevich Gorozhankin. For his role in student politics, he was expelled in December 1894 and was arrested in 1896 but released for want of evidence. He moved to the Petrovsky district and worked as a private tutor, and later as a clerk in a book store. In 1898, he received permission to enter university again and joined Kazan University studying botany under Andrey Gordyagin. He graduated in 1902 and taught at Kazan until 1913. In 1907 he worked in collaboration with Nikolai Dimo on the semi-desert regions. He examined the phytogeography of the steppe and examined classification of the vegetation. He introduced the concept of vegetation complexes that form a distinct layer with species sharing a similar life form, which were later termed as "synusia". He took a special interest in grasses and plants that are drought and salt tolerant. He then joined the Voronezh Agricultural Institute and served at the University of Voronezh from 1919. In 1931 he was posted as director of a new institute under the Academy of Sciences of the Soviet Union which was later called the Komarov Institute. He helped found efforts to produce a Flora of the Soviet Union. He headed the Academy's soil institute from 1935 and worked at the Moscow botanical gardens from 1937 until his death. In 1945 he received the Order of the Red Banner of Labour.
