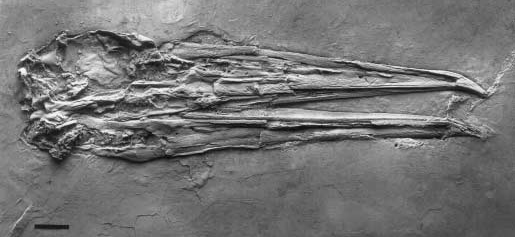
- Skull

Scientific classification
- Kingdom: Animalia
- Phylum: Chordata
- Class: Aves
- Order: Suliformes
- Family: Sulidae
- Genus: †Masillastega; Mayr, 2002
- Species: †M. rectirostris

Binomial name
- †Masillastega rectirostris Mayr, 2002

= Masillastega =

Masillastega Temporal range: Middle Eocene, 47–46 Ma

Extinct genus of birds

Masillastega is an extinct genus of aquatic bird from the Eocene of Germany. The only described species is Masillastega rectirostris. It is related to modern gannets and boobies, but unlike these birds it occurred in freshwater environments. It was found in the lake that would become the Messel Pit.

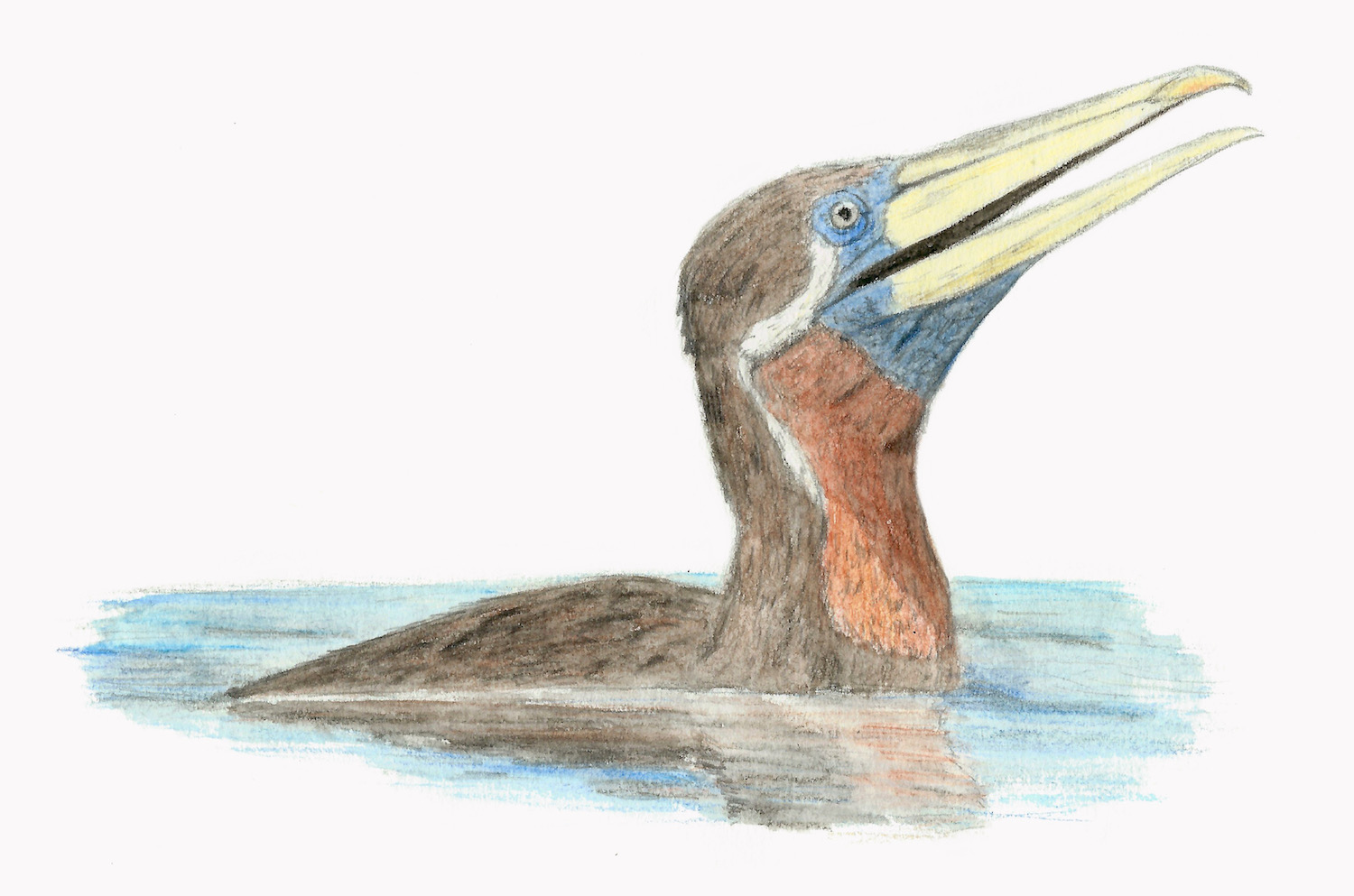
Life restoration
