= Tyto cravesae =

Tyto cravesae Temporal range: Quaternary

Scientific classification
- Kingdom: Animalia
- Phylum: Chordata
- Class: Aves
- Order: Strigiformes
- Family: Tytonidae
- Genus: Tyto
- Species: †T. cravesae

Binomial name
- †Tyto cravesae Suárez & Olson, 2015

Extinct species of bird

Tyto cravesae is an extinct species of Tyto that inhabited Cuba during the Quaternary period.
