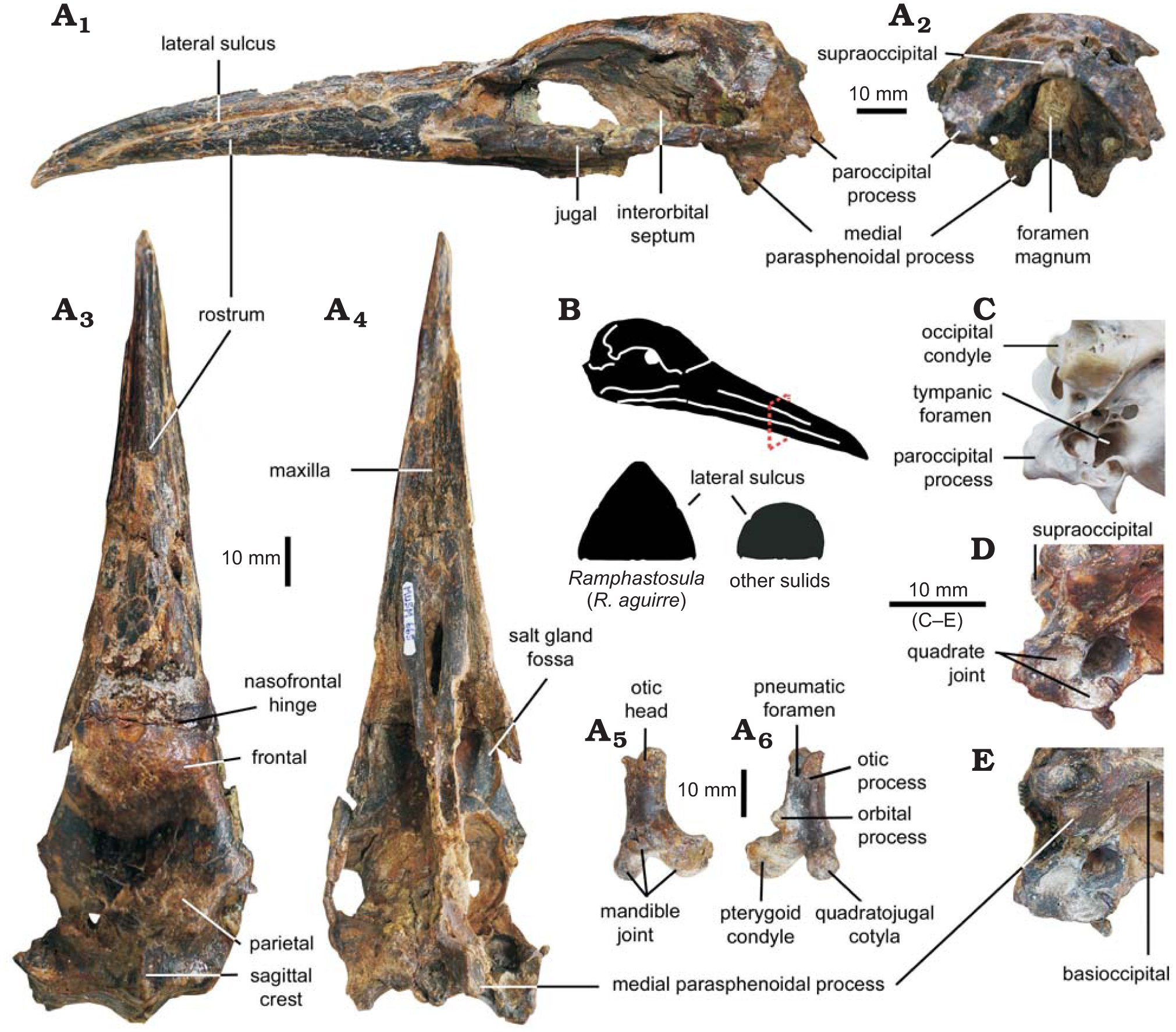
- Holotype of Ramphastosula aguirrei, from the Pisco Formation

Scientific classification
- Kingdom: Animalia
- Phylum: Chordata
- Class: Aves
- Order: Suliformes
- Family: Sulidae
- Genus: †Ramphastosula; Stucchi & Urbina, 2004

Species
- R. ramirezi Stucchi & Urbina, 2004 (type)

= Ramphastosula =

Ramphastosula Temporal range: early Pliocene 5–4 Ma

Extinct genus of bird

Ramphastosula ("toucan booby") is an extinct genus of sulid bird known from fossils discovered in early Pliocene rocks of Peru. The type and only named species is R. ramirezi, named for Peruvian vertebrate paleontologist Gregorio Ramirez. The genus name is a combination of "Rhamphastos", "toucan" and "sula", an Icelandic word for "fool" that has been used to describe boobies (Sulidae, Sula) in general.

Ramphastosula is known from a partial skull that has bony characters placing it in the booby family Sulidae. Unlike living boobies, it has a large bill with a convex upper mandible, reminiscent of a toucan. The remains were recovered from the west side of Sud Sacaco Level (4–5 Million year-old) of the Pisco Formation. This area was a sheltered beach with rock platforms.
