= Foshanornis =

Foshanornis Temporal range: Early Eocene

Scientific classification
- Kingdom: Animalia
- Phylum: Chordata
- Class: Aves
- Genus: †Foshanornis
- Species: †F. songi

Binomial name
- †Foshanornis songi Zhao et al., 2015

Extinct genus of bird

Foshanornis is an extinct monotypic genus of bird that lived in China during the Ypresian stage of the Eocene epoch.

== Taxonomy ==
The phylogenetic relationships of Foshanornis songi are enigmatic and uncertain, but it has been suggested to possibly belong to Trogoniformes.
