= Circaetus haemusensis =

Circaetus haemusensis Temporal range: Early Pleistocene

Scientific classification
- Kingdom: Animalia
- Phylum: Chordata
- Class: Aves
- Order: Accipitriformes
- Family: Accipitridae
- Genus: Circaetus
- Species: †C. haemusensis

Binomial name
- †Circaetus haemusensis Boev, 2015

Extinct species of bird

Circaetus haemusensis is an extinct species of Circaetus that lived in northwestern Bulgaria during the Early Pleistocene.
