= Mioporphyrula =

Mioporphyrula Temporal range: Late Miocene

Scientific classification
- Kingdom: Animalia
- Phylum: Chordata
- Class: Aves
- Order: Gruiformes
- Family: Rallidae
- Genus: †Mioporphyrula
- Species: †M. lungi

Binomial name
- †Mioporphyrula lungi Kurochkin and Ganea, 1972

Extinct monotypic genus of rail

Mioporphyrula, described in 2015, is an extinct monotypic genus of rail that lived in what is now Moldova during the Late Miocene subepoch of the Neogene.

The type species, Mioporphyrula lungi, was described in 1972, though it was not recognised as belonging to its own distinct genus until 2015.
