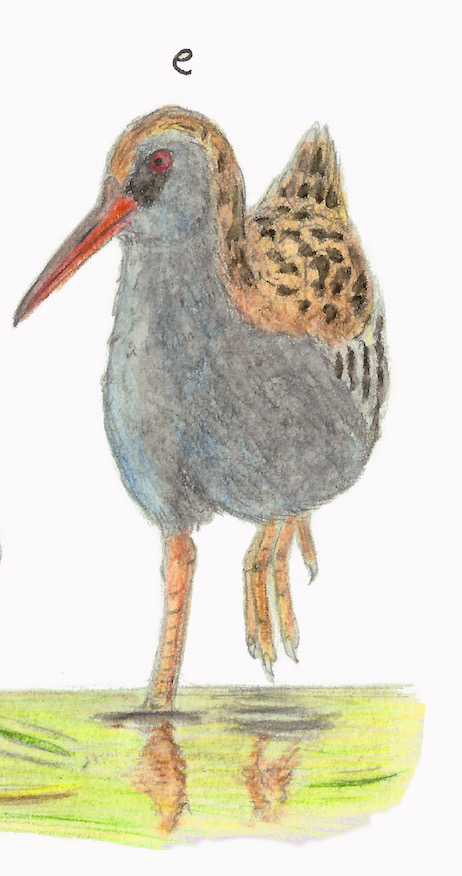
- Artist's illustration of how Rallus adolfocaesaris may have appeared while living.

Scientific classification
- Kingdom: Animalia
- Phylum: Chordata
- Class: Aves
- Order: Gruiformes
- Family: Rallidae
- Genus: Rallus
- Species: †R. adolfocaesaris

Binomial name
- †Rallus adolfocaesaris Alcover et al., 2015

= Rallus adolfocaesaris =

Rallus adolfocaesaris Temporal range: Holocene

Extinct species of bird

Rallus adolfocaesaris is an extinct species of Rallus that inhabited Porto Santo Island of Madeira during the Holocene epoch.
