= Sula brandi =

Sula brandi Temporal range: Miocene

Scientific classification
- Kingdom: Animalia
- Phylum: Chordata
- Class: Aves
- Order: Suliformes
- Family: Sulidae
- Genus: Sula
- Species: †S. brandi

Binomial name
- †Sula brandi Stucchi et al., 2015

Extinct species of bird

Sula brandi is an extinct species belonging to the genus Sula that inhabited Peru during the Miocene epoch.
