= Athene inexpectata =

Athene inexpectata Temporal range: Early Pliocene

Scientific classification
- Kingdom: Animalia
- Phylum: Chordata
- Class: Aves
- Order: Strigiformes
- Family: Strigidae
- Genus: Athene
- Species: †A. inexpectata

Binomial name
- †Athene inexpectata Pavia et al., 2015

Extinct species of owl

Athene inexpectata is an extinct species of Athene that lived in South Africa during the Early Pliocene, its fossils having been discovered in the Varswater Formation.
