= Gallinago azovica =

Gallinago azovica Temporal range: Late Miocene

Scientific classification
- Kingdom: Animalia
- Phylum: Chordata
- Class: Aves
- Order: Charadriiformes
- Family: Scolopacidae
- Genus: Gallinago
- Species: †G. azovica

Binomial name
- †Gallinago azovica Zelenkov & Panteleyev, 2015

Extinct species of bird

Gallinago azovica is an extinct species of Gallinago that lived in Russia near the Sea of Azov during the middle part of the Turolian.
