= Aegypius tugarinovi =

Aegypius tugarinovi Temporal range: Early Pliocene

Scientific classification
- Kingdom: Animalia
- Phylum: Chordata
- Class: Aves
- Order: Accipitriformes
- Family: Accipitridae
- Genus: Aegypius
- Species: †A. tugarinovi

Binomial name
- †Aegypius tugarinovi Manegold & Zelenkov, 2015

Extinct species of bird

Aegypius tugarinovi is an extinct species of Aegypius that lived in Moldova during the Early Pliocene.

== Taxonomy ==
The species is named for Russian ornithologist Arkady Tugarinov.
