= Nyctisoma =

Nyctisoma Temporal range: Middle Miocene

Scientific classification
- Kingdom: Animalia
- Phylum: Chordata
- Class: Aves
- Order: Pelecaniformes
- Family: Ardeidae
- Genus: †Nyctisoma
- Species: †N. robusta

Binomial name
- †Nyctisoma robusta Elżanowski & Zelenkov, 2015

Extinct genus of birds

Nyctisoma is an extinct genus of ardeid (heron) that lived during the Middle Miocene.

== Distribution ==
Nyctisoma robusta fossils are known from the Öoshin Formation of Mongolia.
