= Mangystania =

Mangystania Temporal range: Bartonian

Scientific classification
- Kingdom: Animalia
- Phylum: Chordata
- Class: Aves
- Order: Suliformes
- Genus: †Mangystania
- Species: †M. humilicristata

Binomial name
- †Mangystania humilicristata Zvonok et al., 2016

Extinct genus of suliform bird

Mangystania is an extinct monotypic genus of suliform bird that lived during the Bartonian stage of the Eocene epoch.

== Etymology ==
The generic name of Mangystania refers to the Mangystau Region of Kazakhstan. The specific epithet of the type species, Mangystania humilicristata, references the craniocaudally truncated crista deltopectoralis of the species.
