= Namapsitta =

Namapsitta Temporal range: Bartonian

Scientific classification
- Kingdom: Animalia
- Phylum: Chordata
- Class: Aves
- Order: Psittaciformes
- Genus: †Namapsitta
- Species: †N. praeruptorum

Binomial name
- †Namapsitta praeruptorum Mourer-Chauviré, Pickford, & Senut

Extinct genus of birds

Namapsitta is an extinct genus of psittaciform that lived during the Bartonian stage of the Eocene epoch.

== Distribution ==
Namapsitta praeruptorum is known from the Eocliff locality of Namibia.
