= Oligonomus =

Oligonomus Temporal range: Late Oligocene

Scientific classification
- Kingdom: Animalia
- Phylum: Chordata
- Class: Aves
- Order: Charadriiformes
- Family: Pedionomidae
- Genus: †Oligonomus
- Species: †O. milleri

Binomial name
- †Oligonomus milleri De Pietri et al., 2015

Extinct genus of birds

Oligonomus is an extinct genus of pedionomid that lived during the Chattian stage of the Oligocene epoch.

== Distribution ==
Oligonomus milleri is known from South Australia.
