= Sula figueroae =

Sula figueroae Temporal range: Miocene

Scientific classification
- Kingdom: Animalia
- Phylum: Chordata
- Class: Aves
- Order: Suliformes
- Family: Sulidae
- Genus: Sula
- Species: †S. figueroae

Binomial name
- †Sula figueroae Stucchi et al., 2015

Extinct species of bird

Sula figueroae is an extinct species of Sula that inhabited Peru during the Miocene epoch.
