= Synusia =

Synusia (plural Synusiae) is a term in plant ecology that refers to a layer of vegetation consisting of species with shared life forms. It has been compared with guilds in zoology.

The term synusia was introduced by Helmut Gams in 1918 although similar ideas were proposed using terms such as "Genossenschaften" (brotherhoods) and "Schicht" (society). They have been defined as ecological groups of plants that share similarities in their life-form, share the same niche and play a similar role. They can be taxonomically different but have similar habitats.
