= Hakawai melvillei =

Hakawai melvillei Temporal range: Miocene

Scientific classification
- Kingdom: Animalia
- Phylum: Chordata
- Class: Aves
- Order: Charadriiformes
- Genus: †Hakawai; De Pietri et al. 2015
- Species: †H. melvillei

Binomial name
- †Hakawai melvillei De Pietri et al. 2015

Extinct species of bird

Hakawai is an extinct genus of prehistoric birds that lived during the early Miocene to middle Miocene in New Zealand. According to a 2015 paper, Hakawai melvillei was a representative of a large group of birds that comprises the seedsnipes of family Thinocoridae) and the plains-wanderer (family Pedionomidae). This discovery sheds light on evolutionary processes at work when South America, Antarctica, Australia, and New Zealand were all parts of Gondwanaland.
