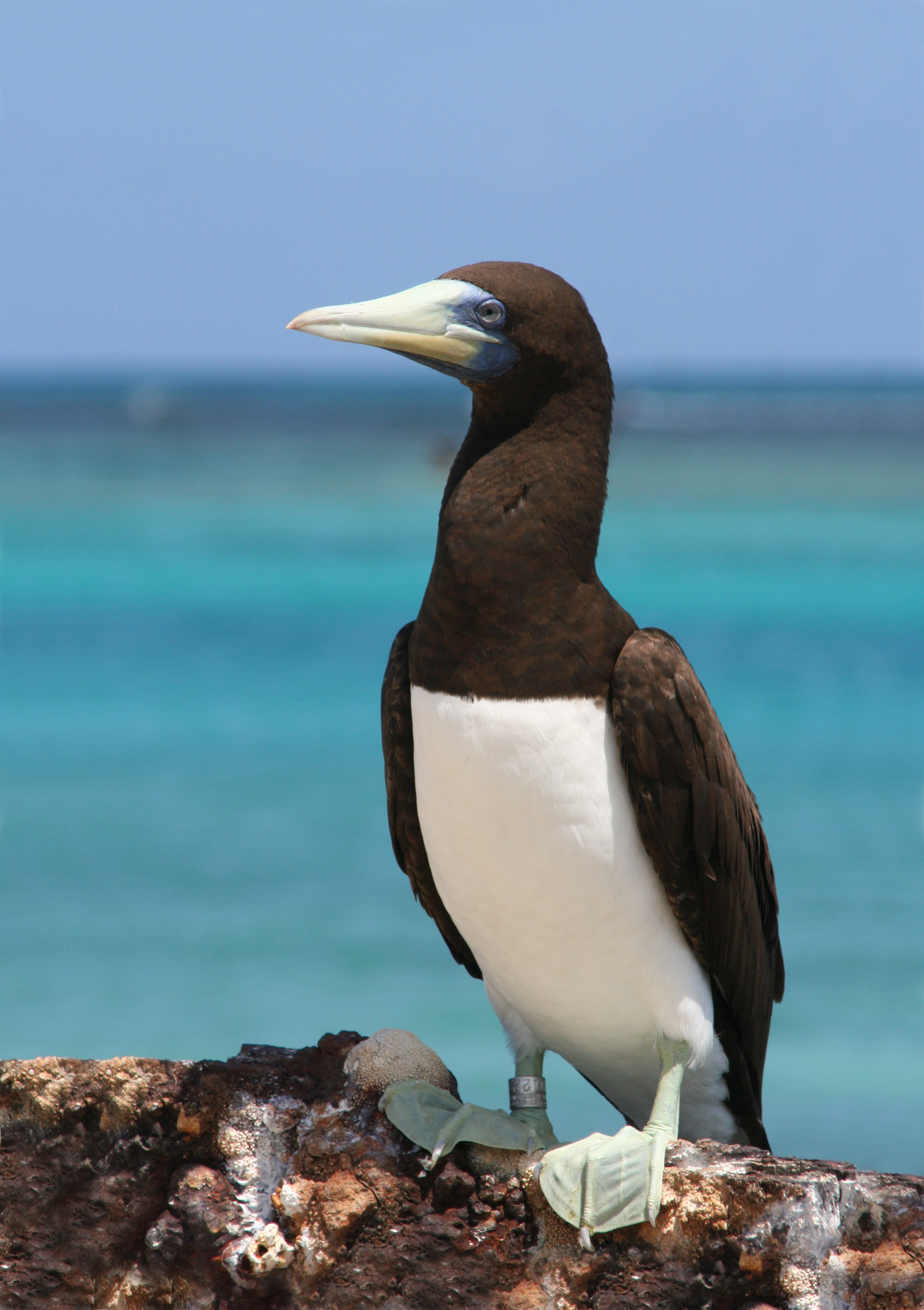
- Brown booby, Sula leucogaster

Scientific classification
- Kingdom: Animalia
- Phylum: Chordata
- Class: Aves
- Order: Suliformes
- Family: Sulidae; Reichenbach, 1849

Genera
- Morus; Papasula; Sula † Masillastega

Synonyms
- Enkurosulidae Kashin, 1977; Pseudosulidae Harrison, 1975

= Sulidae =

Sulidae Temporal range: Early Eocene – recent 47–0 Ma

Family of birds

The bird family Sulidae comprises the gannets and boobies. Collectively called sulids, they are medium-large coastal seabirds that plunge-dive for fish and similar prey. The 11 species in this family are often considered congeneric in older sources, placing all in the genus Sula. However, Sula (true boobies) and Morus (gannets) can be distinguished via morphological, behavioral, and DNA sequence characters. Abbott's booby (Papasula) is given its own genus, as it stands apart from both in these respects. It appears to be a distinct and ancient lineage, maybe closer to the gannets than to the true boobies.

== Description ==
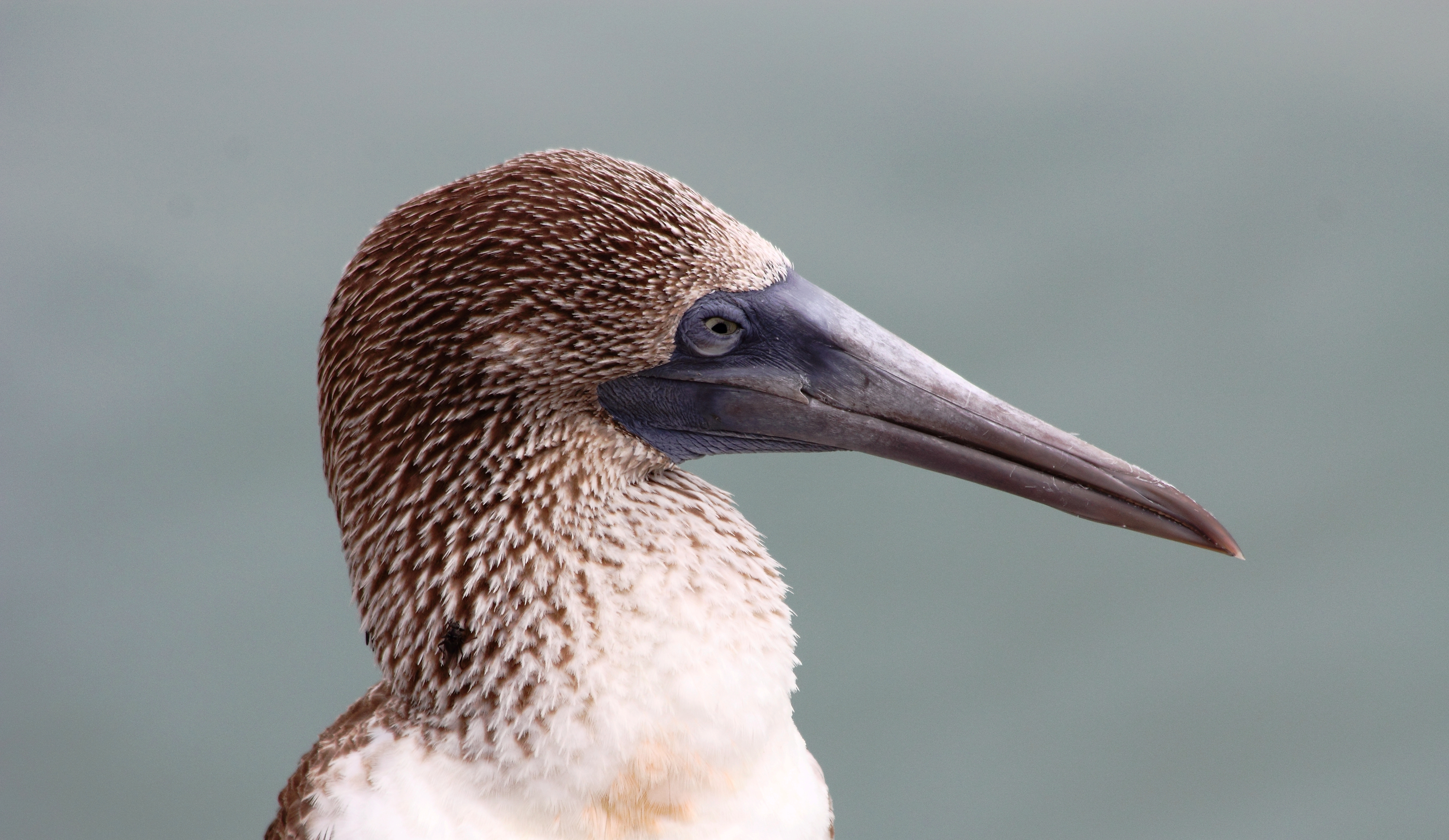
Blue-footed booby (Sula nebouxii) with distinctive colouring and bill.

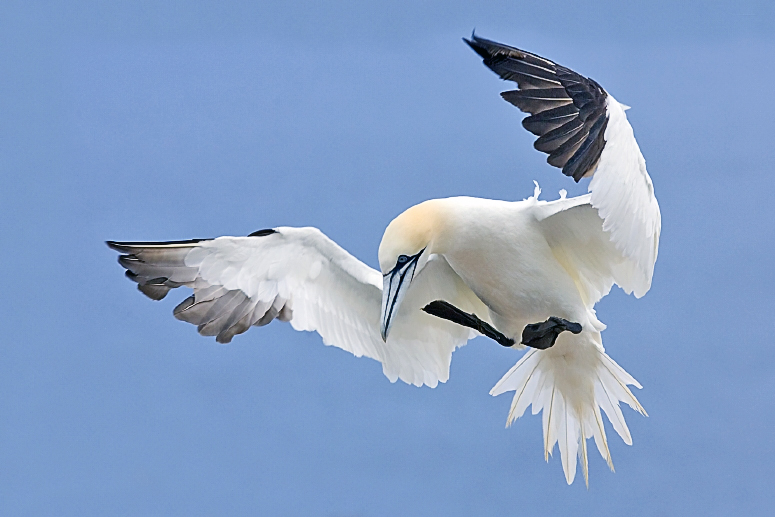
Northern gannet (Morus bassanus) preparing to land

Sulids measure about 60 to 85 cm (24 to 33 in) in length and have a wingspan around 140 to 175 cm (4.59 to 5.74 ft). They have long, narrow, and pointed wings, and a quite long, graduated, and rather lozenge-shaped tail whose outer feathers are shorter than the central ones. Their flight muscles are rather small to allow for the small cross-section required for plunge-diving, as an adaptive trade-off relative to some sacrifice in flight performance. Consequently, they are very streamlined, reducing drag, so their bodies are "torpedo-shaped" and somewhat flat.

They have stout legs and webbed feet, with the web connecting all four toes. In some species, the webs are brightly colored and used in courtship displays. The bill is usually conspicuously colored, long, deep at the base, and pointed, with saw-like edges. The upper mandible curves down slightly at the tip and can be moved upward to accept large prey. To keep water out during plunges, the nostrils enter into the bill rather than opening to the outside directly. The eyes are angled forward, and provide a wider field of binocular vision than in most other birds.

Their plumage is either all-white (or light brownish or greyish) with dark wingtips and (usually) tail, or at least some dark brown or black above with white underparts; gannets have a yellowish hue to their heads. The face usually has some sort of black markings, typically on the lores. Unlike their relatives (the darters and cormorants), sulids have a well-developed preen gland whose waxy secretions they spread on their feathers for waterproofing and pest control. They moult their tail feathers irregularly and the flight feathers of their wings in stages, so that starting at the first moult, they always have some old feathers, some new ones, and some partly grown ones. Moult as a response to periods of stress has been recorded.

== Distribution and ecology ==
The sulids are distributed mainly in tropical and subtropical waters, but they, particularly gannets, are found in temperate regions, too. These birds are not truly pelagic seabirds like the related Procellariiformes, and usually stay rather close to the coasts, but the abundant colonies of sulids that exist on many Pacific islands suggest that they are not infrequently blown away from their home range by storms, and can wander for long distances in search of a safe place to land if need be.

All species feed entirely at sea, mostly on mid-sized fish and similarly sized marine invertebrates (e.g. cephalopods). Many species feed communally, and some species follow fishing boats to scavenge discarded bycatch and chum. The typical hunting behavior is a dive from midair, taking the bird a 1–2 m under water. If prey manages to escape the diving birds at first, they may give chase using their legs and wings for underwater swimming.

As noted above, the behavioral traits of gannets and boobies differ considerably, but the Sulidae as a whole are characterized by several behavioral synapomorphies: Before taking off, they point their bills upwards (gannets) or forward (boobies). After landing again, they point downwards with their bills. In response to a threat, they do not attack, but shake their heads and point their bills towards the intruders.

=== Reproduction ===
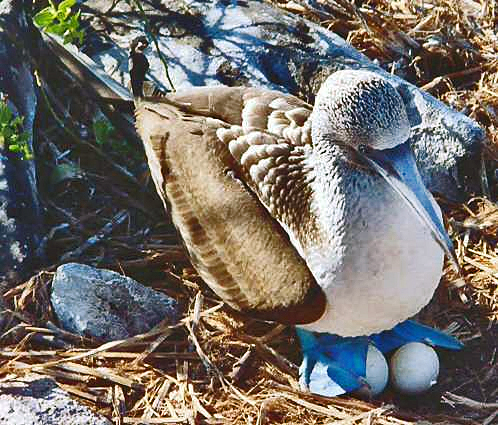
A blue-footed booby (Sula nebouxii) incubating its eggs

All sulids breed in colonies. Males examine the colony area in flight and then pick a nest site, which they defend by fighting and territorial displays. Males then advertise to females by a special display and call. Their display behavior is characteristic, though not as diverse as the numerous variations found among the cormorants; it typically includes the male shaking his head. Females search the colony in flight and on foot for a mate. Once they select males, pairs maintain their bonds by preening each other and by frequent copulation.

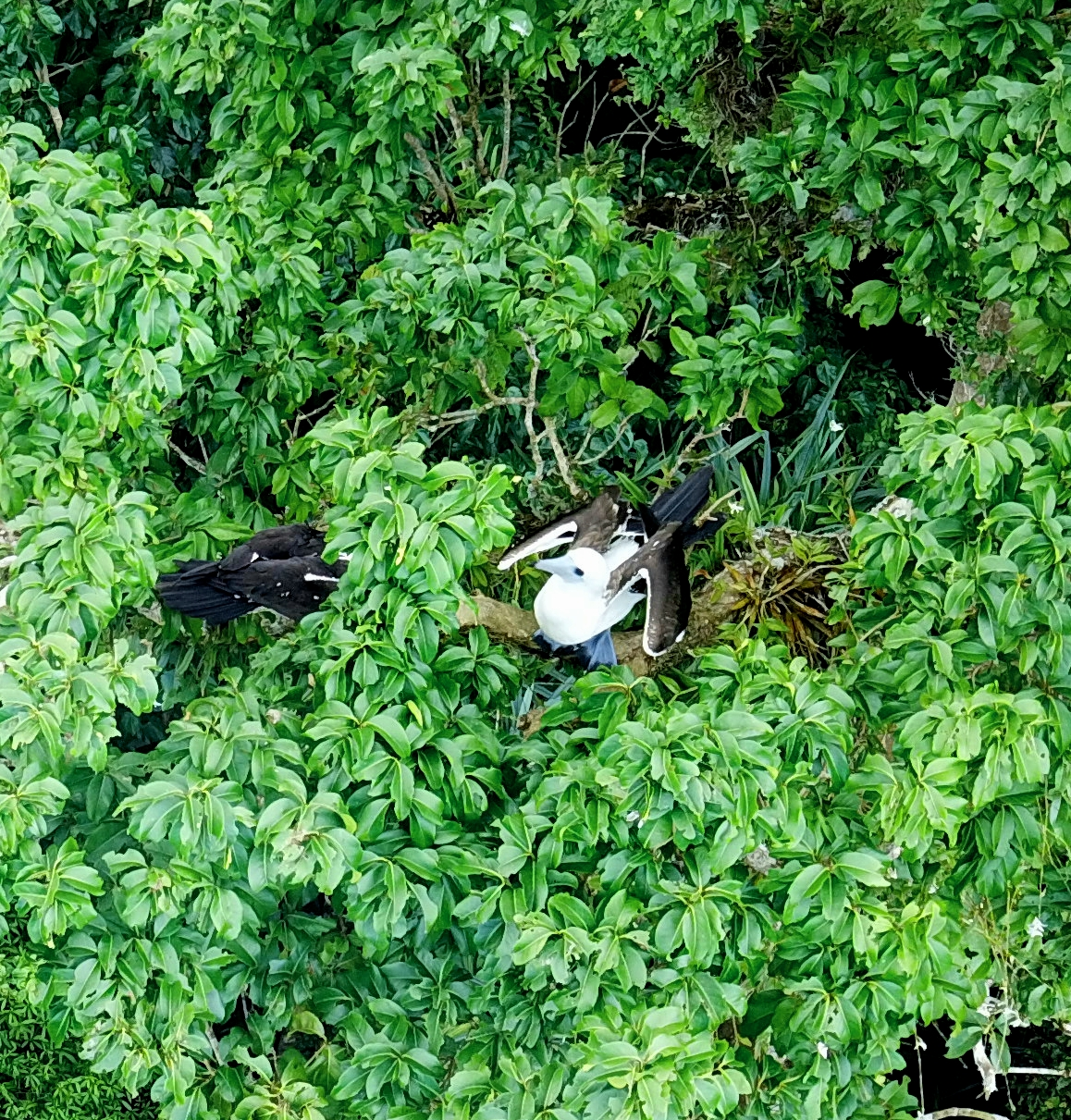
Abbott's booby fledgling still get fed by their parents several months after being able to fly and stay in the same tree, mostly even on the same branch, where the nest was situated.

The clutch is typically two eggs. The eggs are unmarked (but may become stained by debris in the nest), whitish, pale blue, green, or pink, and have a coating that resembles lime. Egg weight ranges from 3.3 to 8.0% of the female's weight. Incubation lasts 42 to 55 days, depending on the species. Both sexes incubate; like their relatives, they do not have brood patches, but their feet become vascularized and hot, and the birds place the eggs under the webs. Eggs lost during the first half of incubation are replaced.

At hatching, parents move the eggs and then the hatchlings to the tops of their webs. The young hatch naked, but soon develop white down. They beg by touching the parent's bill and take regurgitated food straight from its gape. At first, at least one parent is always in attendance of the altricial young; after two weeks, both parents leave the nest unguarded at times while they go fishing. The times for the chicks to fledge and become independent of their parents depend greatly on the food supply. Rarely does more than one chick survive to maturity, except in the Peruvian booby (Sula variegata), which has the biggest clutch (two to four eggs), and less often in the blue-footed booby (S. nebouxii). Siblicide by the stronger of two chicks is frequent.

== Systematics and evolution ==
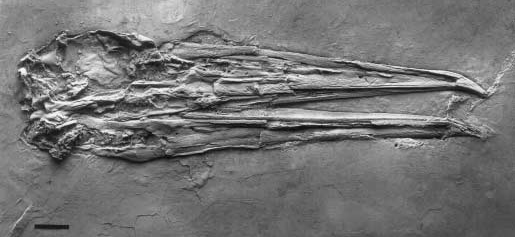

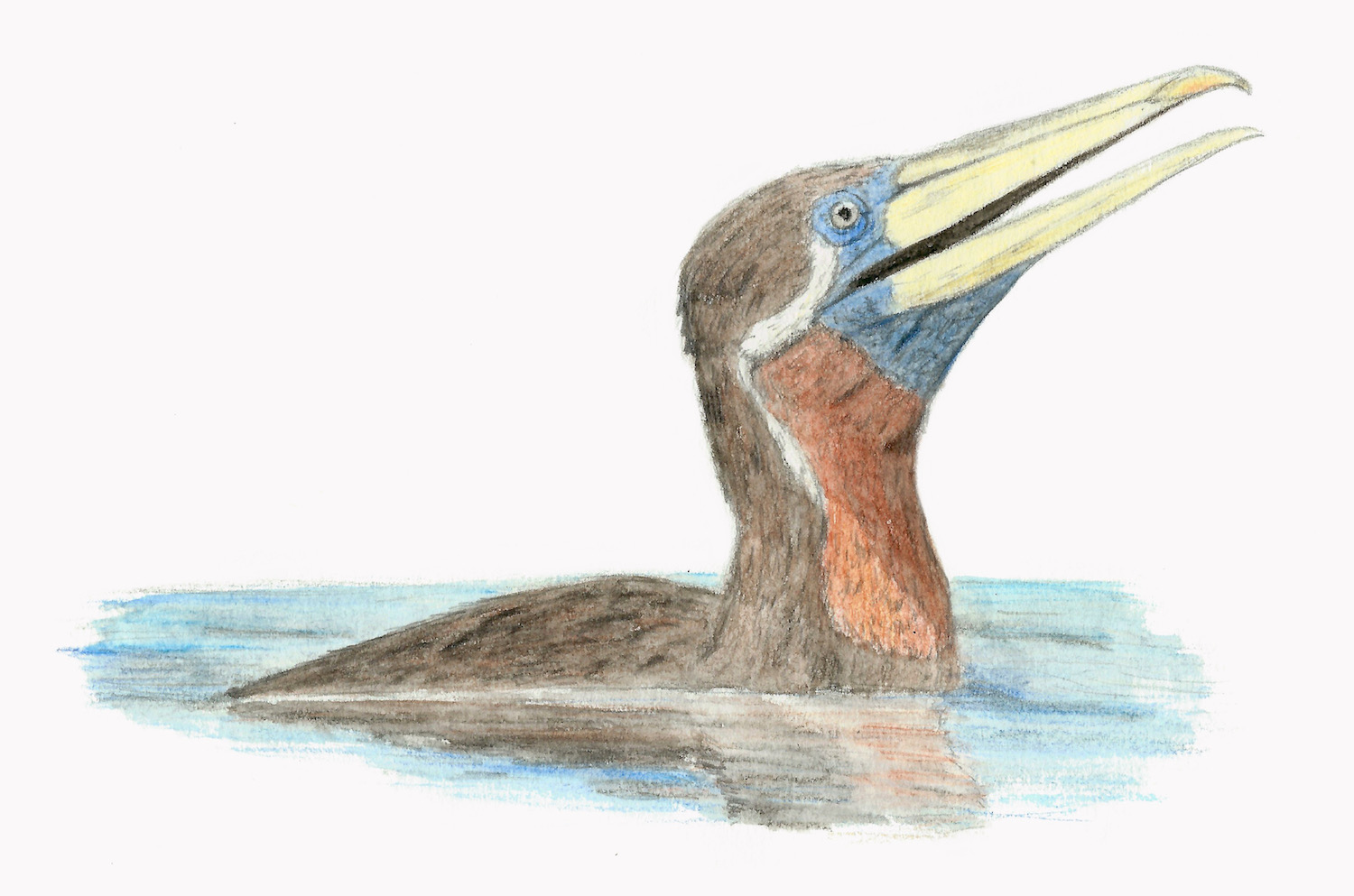
Skull (above) and life restoration (below) of the freshwater Masillastega rectirostris, one of the earliest known fossil sulids

Sulids are related to a number of other aquatic birds, which all lack external nostrils and a brood patch, but have all four toes webbed and a gular sac. The closest living relatives of the Sulidae are the Phalacrocoracidae (cormorants and shags) and the Anhingidae (darters). The latter are somewhat intermediate between sulids and cormorants, but (like many cormorants) they are freshwater birds in a clade containing otherwise seabirds, and also symplesiomorphic with sulids but synapomorphic with cormorants in some other respects. Thus, the Sulidae seem to be the oldest and most distinct lineage of those three, which are united in a suborder Sulae. Therein, the Sulidae are typically placed simply as a family; sometimes, a superfamily Suloidea is recognized, wherein some of the primitive prehistoric forms (e.g. Empheresula, Eostega, and Masillastega) are placed as basal lineages distinct from the living Sulidae. However, the proposed family Pseudosulidae (or Enkurosulidae) is almost certainly invalid.

Sulid phylogeny

- - Abbott's booby (Papasula abbotti)
  - - - Northern gannet (Morus bassanus)
      - - Cape gannet (Morus capensis)
        - Australasian gannet (Morus serrator)
    - - Red-footed booby (Sula sula)
      - - Brown booby (Sula leucogaster)
        - - - Masked booby (Sula dactylatra)
            - Nazca booby (Sula granti)
          - - Blue-footed booby (Sula nebouxii)
            - Peruvian booby (Sula variegata)

Cladogram showing the family Sulidae.

The Sulae were traditionally included in the Pelecaniformes in its obsolete paraphyletic circumscription, but pelicans, the namesake family of the Pelecaniformes, are actually more closely related to herons, ibises and spoonbills, the hamerkop, and the shoebill than to the sulids and allies. In recognition of this, the Sulae have been proposed for separation in a new order Phalacrocoraciformes, which also includes the frigatebirds (Fregatidae), as well as one or more prehistoric lineages that are entirely extinct today. The IOC World Bird List uses Suliformes as the proposed order name.

Within the family itself, three living genera—Sula (boobies, six species), Papasula (Abbott's booby), and Morus (gannets, three species)—are recognized. A 2011 study of multiple genes found Abbott's booby to be basal to all other gannets and boobies, and likely to have diverged from them around 22 million years ago, and the ancestors of the gannets and remaining boobies split around 17 million years ago. The most recent common ancestor of all boobies lived in the late Miocene around 6 million years ago, after which time the boobies steadily diverged. The gannets split more recently, only around 2.5 million years ago.

As of 2024 the American Ornithological Society unanimously voted to split the Cocos booby (Sula brewsteri) from the Peruvian booby (Sula variegata) as a new species due to behavioural differences

Species of Sulid
Common and binomial names	Image	Range
Northern gannet (Morus bassanus)		Western Europe and North America
Cape gannet (Morus capensis)		West to Southwest African coast
Australasian gannet (Morus serrator or Sula bassana)		Australia and New Zealand
Abbott's booby (Papasula abbotti)		Christmas Island
Blue-footed booby (Sula nebouxii)		Eastern Pacific Ocean from California to the Galápagos Islands south into Peru
Masked booby (Sula dactylatra)		Tropical oceans between the 30th parallel north and 30th parallel south. In the Indian Ocean it ranges from the coastlines of the Arabian Peninsula and East Africa across to Sumatra and Western Australia
Nazca booby (Sula granti)		Eastern Pacific from the islands in Baja California to the Galápagos Islands and the Isla de la Plata in Ecuador and Malpelo in Colombia
Brown booby (Sula leucogaster)		Pantropical areas of the Atlantic and Pacific Oceans
Red-footed booby (Sula sula)		Most tropical areas of oceans, main exceptions being tropical areas of E Atlantic and SE Pacific, breeding on islands
Peruvian booby (Sula variegata)		Coast of South America from Peru to Chile
Cocos booby (Sula brewsteri)		East pacific ocean from costa rica to Colombia, also recorded breeding in Hawaii and Japan

The fossil record of sulids is quite extensive due to the many Miocene/Pliocene forms that have been recovered, but the lineage of sulids extends back to the Eocene, and all things (such as the Early Eocene frigatebird Limnofregata) considered, the sulids seem to have diverged from the lineage leading to cormorants and darters around 50 million years ago (Mya), perhaps a bit earlier. The initial evolutionary radiation formed a number of genera that are now completely extinct, such as the freshwater Masillastega (which, as noted above, might not have been a modern-type sulid) or the bizarre Rhamphastosula (which had a bill shaped like an aracari's). The modern genera evolved (like many other living genera of birds) around the Oligocene-Miocene boundary about 23 Mya. Microsula, which lived during that time, seems to have been a primitive booby that still had many symplesiomorphies with gannets. Like the other Phalacrocoraciformes, the sulids originated probably in the general region of the Atlantic or western Tethys Sea – probably the latter rather than the former, given that their earliest fossils are abundant in Europe, but absent from the well-studied contemporary American deposits.

Prehistoric sulids (or suloids) only known from fossils are:

- Masillastega (Early Eocene of Messel, Germany) – may belong in Eostega
- Eostega (Late Eocene of Cluj-Manastur, Romania) – may include Masillastega
- Sulidae gen. et sp. indet. (Thalberg Late Oligocene of Germany) – Empheresula?
- Sulidae gen. et sp. indet. (Late Oligocene of South Carolina, United States) – Microsula?
- Empheresula (Late Oligocene of Gannat, France – Middle Miocene of Steinheimer Becken, Germany) – including "Sula" arvernensis, "Parasula"
- Microsula (Late Oligocene of South Carolina, United States – Grund Middle Miocene of Austria) – may belong in Morus or Sula, includes "Sula" avita, "S." pygmaea, Enkurosula, "Pseudosula"
- Sarmatosula (Middle Miocene of Credinţa, Romania)
- Miosula (Late Miocene of California)
- Paleosula (Early Pliocene? of California)
- Ramphastosula (Pisco Early Pliocene of SC Peru)
- Bimbisula (middle Pliocene of South Carolina)
- Sulidae gen. et sp. indet. (Late Pliocene of Valle di Fine, Italy) – Morus?

For prehistoric species of the extant genera, see the genus articles.

The Early Oligocene Prophalacrocorax ronzoni of Ronzon, France, was variously placed in the seaduck genus Mergus, in Sula, and after a distinct genus was established for it, in the Phalacrocoracidae. While it is quite likely to belong in the Sulae and may have been an ancient sulid (or suloid), of the three placements explicitly proposed, none seems to be correct.
