= List of individual hippopotamids =

This is a list of individually notable hippopotamids, a taxonomic family containing two extant species: the common hippopotamus and the pygmy hippopotamus.

== Common hippos ==
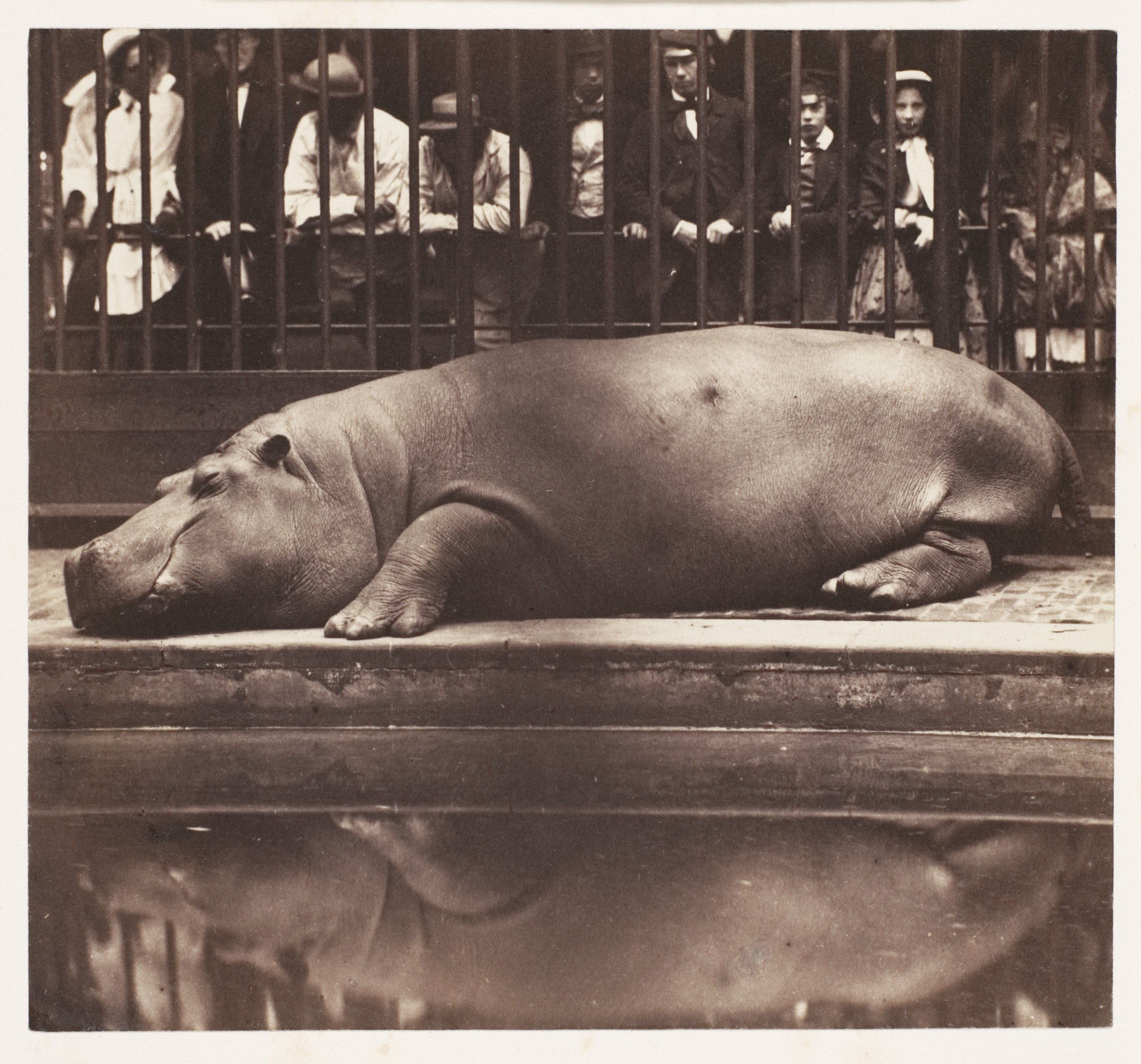
Obaysch in London Zoo, 1852

=== Archaeological specimens ===
- The Allenton Hippo skeletal remains
- The Armley Hippo skeletal remains

=== Intact ===
- Fiona, the first common hippopotamus to be imaged on ultrasound pre-natally and lightest known Nile hippopotamus calf to survive (29 pounds)
- Hipolit, whose skeleton is displayed at Silesian Zoo
- Huberta, who walked 1,000 miles along the coast of South Africa
- Knautschke, who was born in Berlin Zoo in 1943 and survived the Battle in Berlin
- Lu (1960-2025), a longtime resident of Homosassa Springs and an honorary citizen of Florida.
- Mae Mali, the longest-living hippopotamus in captivity in the world
- Obaysch, the first common hippo to live in Europe since the collapse of the Roman Empire
- Owen, who survived the 2004 Indian Ocean tsunami and is known for his companionship with an Aldabra giant tortoise called Mzee
- Teteia, who was the oldest animal in São Paulo Zoo at the time of her death

== Pygmy hippos ==
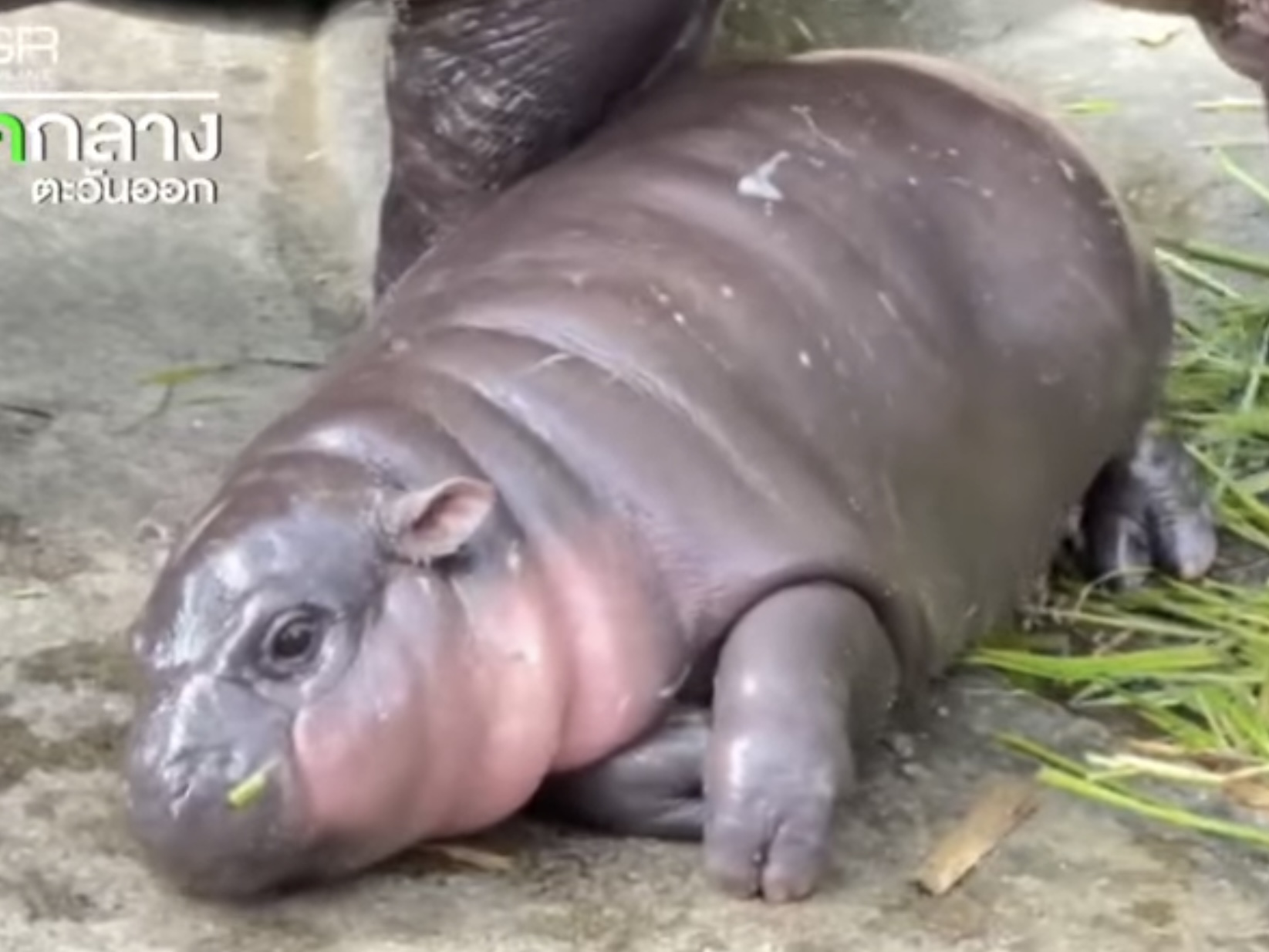
Moo Deng in Khao Kheow Open Zoo, 2024

- Billy (full name William Johnson Hippopotamus), the pet of United States president Calvin Coolidge
- Haggis, who was born at Edinburgh Zoo and lives in Wingham Wildlife Park.
- Mars, who was born at Tanganyika Wildlife Park, Kansas, and was filmed interacting with his mother in a viral video when he was 6 weeks old
- Moo Deng, subject of an internet meme in late 2024
- Poppy, who was born at the Metro Richmond Zoo in Virginia in 2024.
- Hugo, who was born at the John Ball Zoo in Grand Rapids, Michigan in 2025
- Maple, who was born at the Toronto Zoo in Toronto, Ontario, Canada on August 2nd 2026

== See also ==
- Lists of animals
