= Mae Mali =

Hippopotamus in Thailand

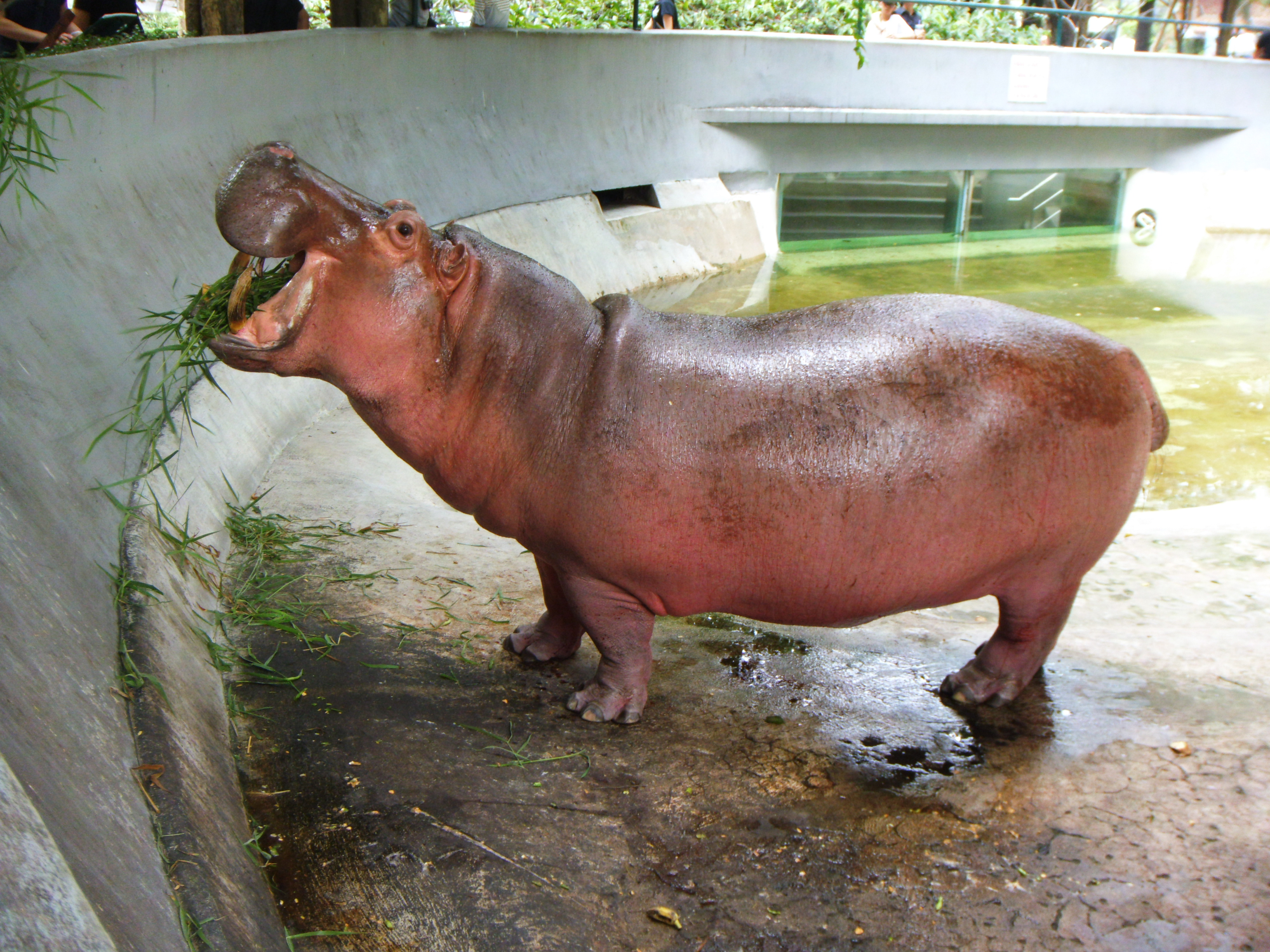
- Mae Mali in 2017
- Species: Hippopotamus; (Hippopotamus amphibius)
- Sex: Female
- Born: 9 September 1965 (age 61); Cologne Zoo, Cologne, Germany
- Residence: Khao Kheow Open Zoo, Chonburi, Thailand
- Parents: Toni; Aenne II
- Mate: Tamil

Mae Mali (Thai: แม่มะลิ, pronounced [mɛ́ː.má.lí], lit. 'mother jasmine') is a female hippopotamus living in Thailand. She is believed to be the longest-living hippopotamus in captivity in the world. Currently, she resides at Khao Kheow Open Zoo in Chonburi province, in the eastern Thailand.

== Life ==
Mae Mali was originally a favorite at Dusit Zoo (also known as Khao Din) in Bangkok before the zoo was relocated at the end of September 2018 to a new site in Pathum Thani. As a result, animals at the original location were transferred to various zoos across the country. Mae Mali was moved to Khao Kheow Open Zoo.

Mae Mali was born on September 9, 1965, at Cologne Zoo in Germany. Shortly after her birth, she was moved to Dierenpark Tilburg in Tilburg, the Netherlands.

On June 8, 1967, as part of an animal exchange program between Dusit Zoo and Dierenpark Tilburg, Mae Mali was officially transferred to Dusit Zoo. In return, Dusit Zoo sent a gibbon to the Netherlands. Since then, she had become one of the most iconic residents of Dusit Zoo.

Her grandfather, Nauke, was born in the wild in Africa, and her grandmother, Aenne I, was also born in the African wild. Her father, Toni, was born at Cologne Zoo, while her mother, Aenne II, was born in the wild in Africa. Mae Mali had ten siblings: seven males and three females. She is well known as a female hippopotamus who gave birth to an impressive 14 offspring. Her first mate was named Tamil.

Mae Mali has distinctive features compared to other hippopotamuses: her skin is darker, and she has a mole in the middle of her back.

It has been a tradition every year, dating back to her time at Dusit Zoo, that the zoo celebrates Mae Mali's birthday. The celebration includes offering her special treats, such as extra vegetable and fruit. Mae Mali was cared for by a single dedicated keeper for over 30 years, until he retired in 2023, shortly after her 58th birthday.

== Mae Mali's 14 offspring ==
From her first mate, Tamil:

- Torpedo – Male, born August 6, 1971; currently at Chiang Mai Zoo
- Wirachon – Male, born October 13, 1973; currently at Chiang Mai Zoo
- Maliwan – Female, born September 24, 1976; currently at Chiang Mai Zoo
- Karuna – Male, born September 22, 1978; currently at Khao Kheow Open Zoo
- Num – Male, born July 11, 1980; deceased
- Pranee – Female, born August 17, 1981; currently at Khao Kheow Open Zoo
- [Unnamed] – Female, born October 4, 1982; currently at Khao Kheow Open Zoo

From her later mate(s):

- Malai – Female, born July 31, 1984; currently in Malaysia
- Keng – Male, born June 4, 1986; currently at Samutprakarn Crocodile Farm and Zoo
- Kao – Male, born September 9, 1987; currently in Laos
- Nueng – Male, born October 1, 1989; currently at Khao Kheow Open Zoo
- Lek – Female, born November 9, 1993; currently at Khao Kheow Open Zoo
- Krathong – Male, born November 23, 1996; currently at Nakhon Ratchasima Zoo
- Mayom – Male, born August 9, 1999; currently at Khao Kheow Open Zoo

== See also ==
- Moo Deng
- Fiona
