= Mars (pygmy hippo) =

Male pygmy hippopotamus from Kansas

- Species: Choeropsis liberiensis
- Sex: Male
- Born: June 26, 2025 (age 16 months); Goddard, Kansas, U.S.
- Known for: Viral video featuring a maternal "mom stare"; public naming vote; people visiting from all over the United States
- Residence: Tanganyika Wildlife Park (Goddard, Kansas)
- Parents: Pluto (sire) and Posie (dam)

Mars (born June 26, 2025) is a male pygmy hippopotamus (Choeropsis liberiensis). He was the fifth pygmy hippo calf born at Tanganyika Wildlife Park in Goddard, Kansas, United States.

== Early life ==
Tanganyika Wildlife Park announced that a male pygmy hippopotamus calf was born there on June 26, 2025. He was the fifth calf born to adults Posie (dam) and Pluto (sire).

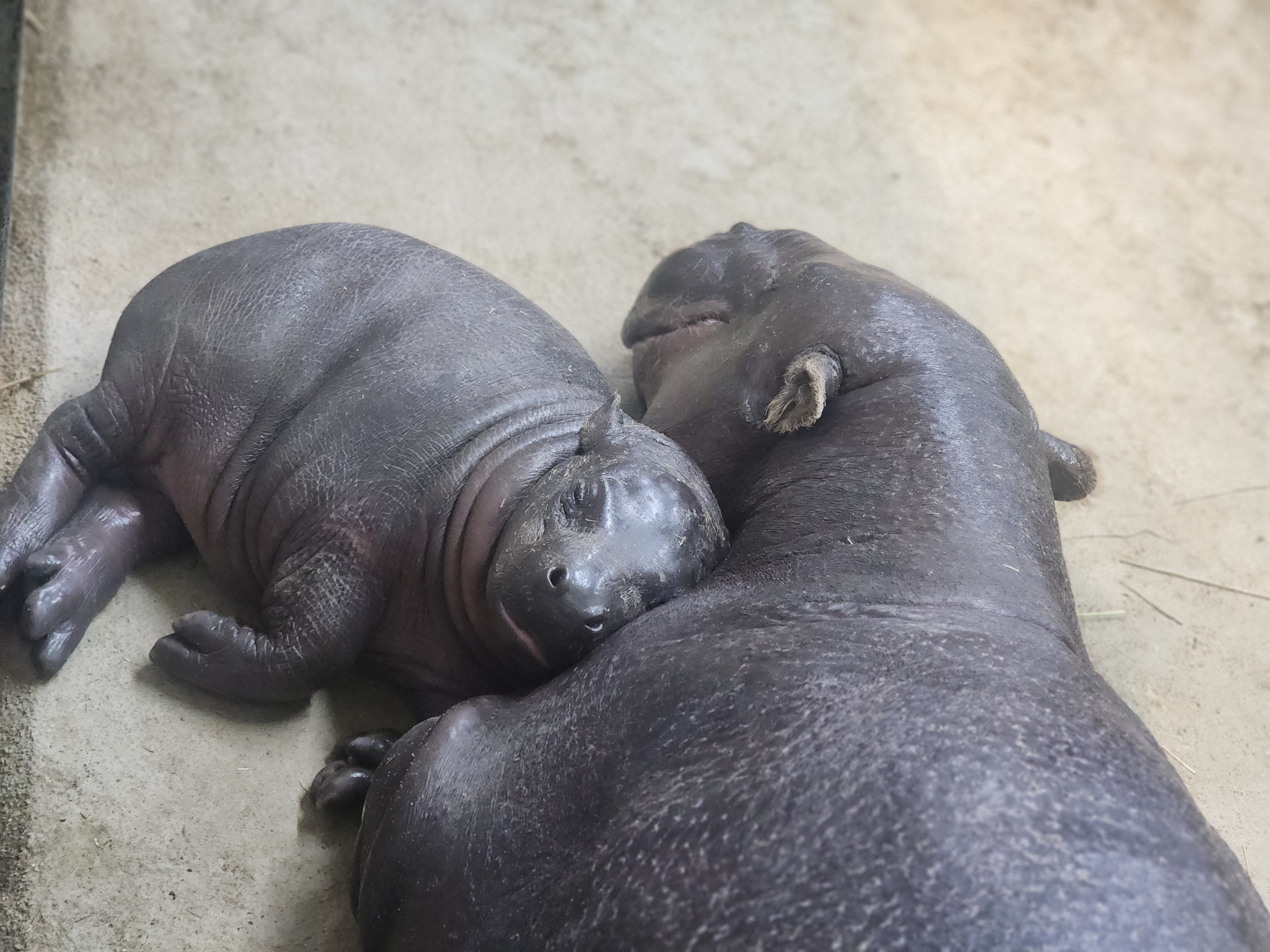
Mom and calf sleeping at Tanganyika Wildlife Park

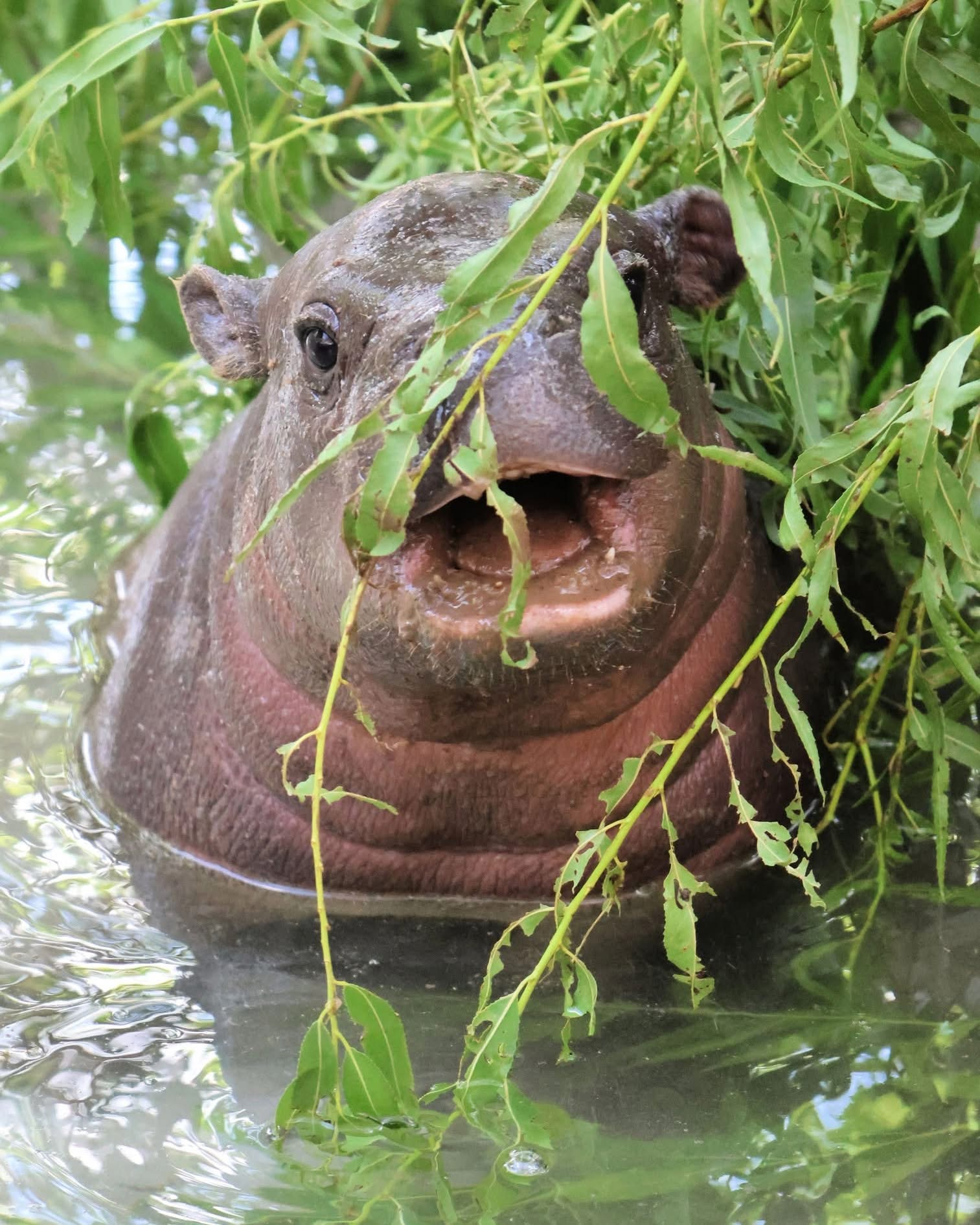
Mars the pygmy hippo was born at Tanganyika Wildlife Park in June 2025.

== Media coverage and popularity ==
A clip shared in August 2025 showed Mars being coaxed and pushed out of the pool by a keeper and also Mars lingering in a pool until his mother intervened with a look, which ABC described as a "universal 'mom stare'"." The segment ran on World News Tonight with David Muir. National Geographic profiled Mars' rise alongside broader context about pygmy hippo popularity on social media following the Thai calf Moo Deng.

In August 2026, a documentary about Mars, Take Me to Mars, premiered at Regal Warren West in Wichita, Kansas. The documentary follows Mars during his first year at Tanganyika Wildlife Park, including the keepers, veterinarians and conservationists involved in his care. The film was produced by Tanganyika Wildlife Park and was later selected for screening at the 2026 Salt City Film Festival.

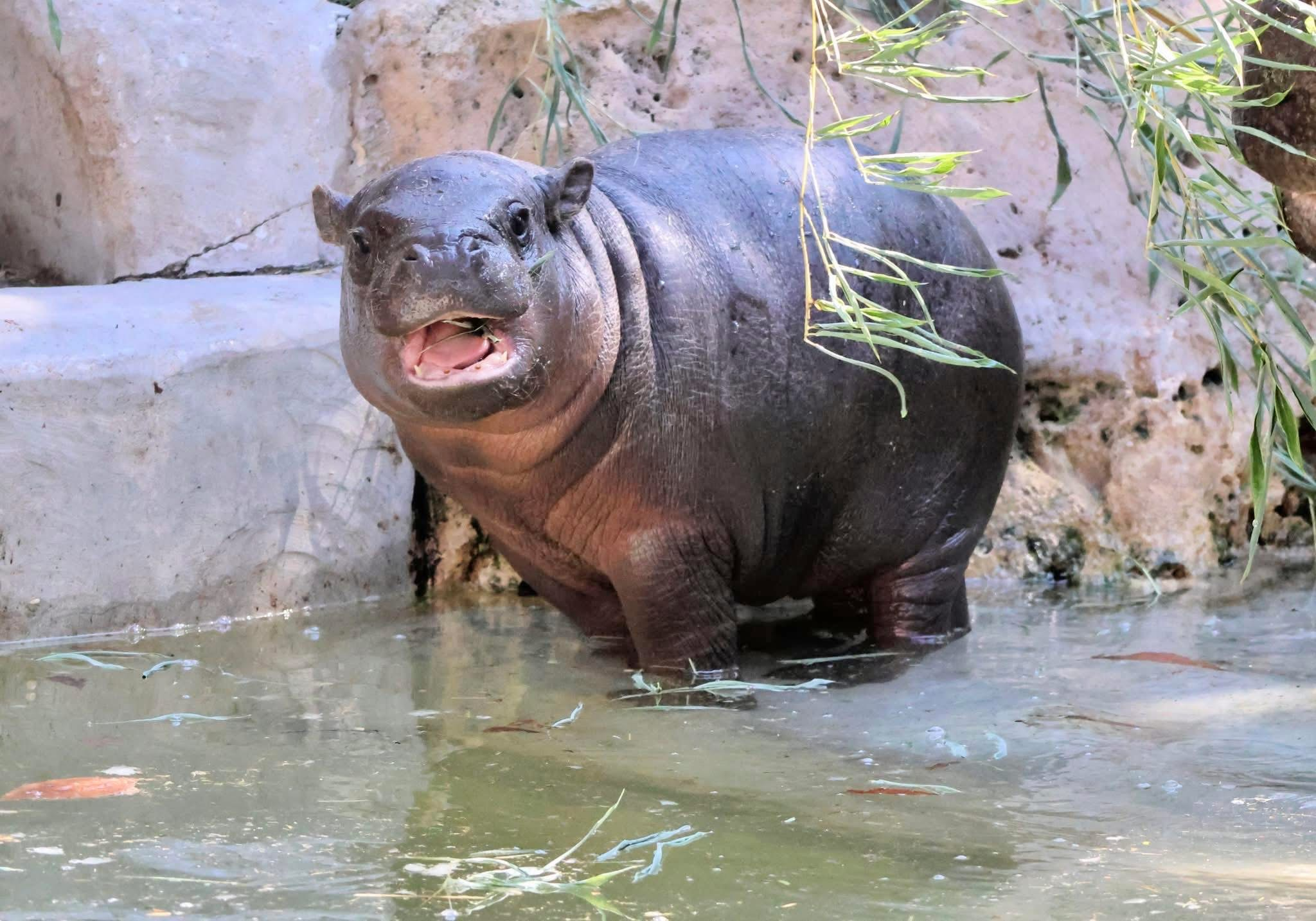
Mars the pygmy hippo was born at Tanganyika Wildlife Park in June 2025.

== See also ==
- Pygmy hippopotamus
- Haggis (pygmy hippo)
- Poppy (pygmy hippopotamus)
