= Billy (pygmy hippopotamus) =

Calvin Coolidge's pygmy hippopotamus

- Other name: William Johnson Hippopotamus
- Species: Pygmy hippopotamus (Choeropsis liberiensis)
- Sex: Male
- Born: Before 1927; Liberia
- Died: October 11, 1955
- Employer: National Zoo
- Years active: c. 1930 – 1955
- Residence: National Zoo
- Offspring: 23 calves

Billy, also known as William Johnson Hippopotamus (before 1927 – October 11, 1955), was a pygmy hippopotamus given to United States President Calvin Coolidge. Captured in Liberia, he was given to Coolidge by Harvey S. Firestone in 1927. Billy spent most of his life in the National Zoo in Washington, D.C. In addition to his fame as an exotic presidential pet—which afforded him a trip to the 1939 New York World's Fair—Billy is also notable as the common ancestor to most pygmy hippopotamuses in American zoos. By the time of his death in 1955, Billy had sired 23 calves, 13 of whom survived at least a year.

== Early years ==
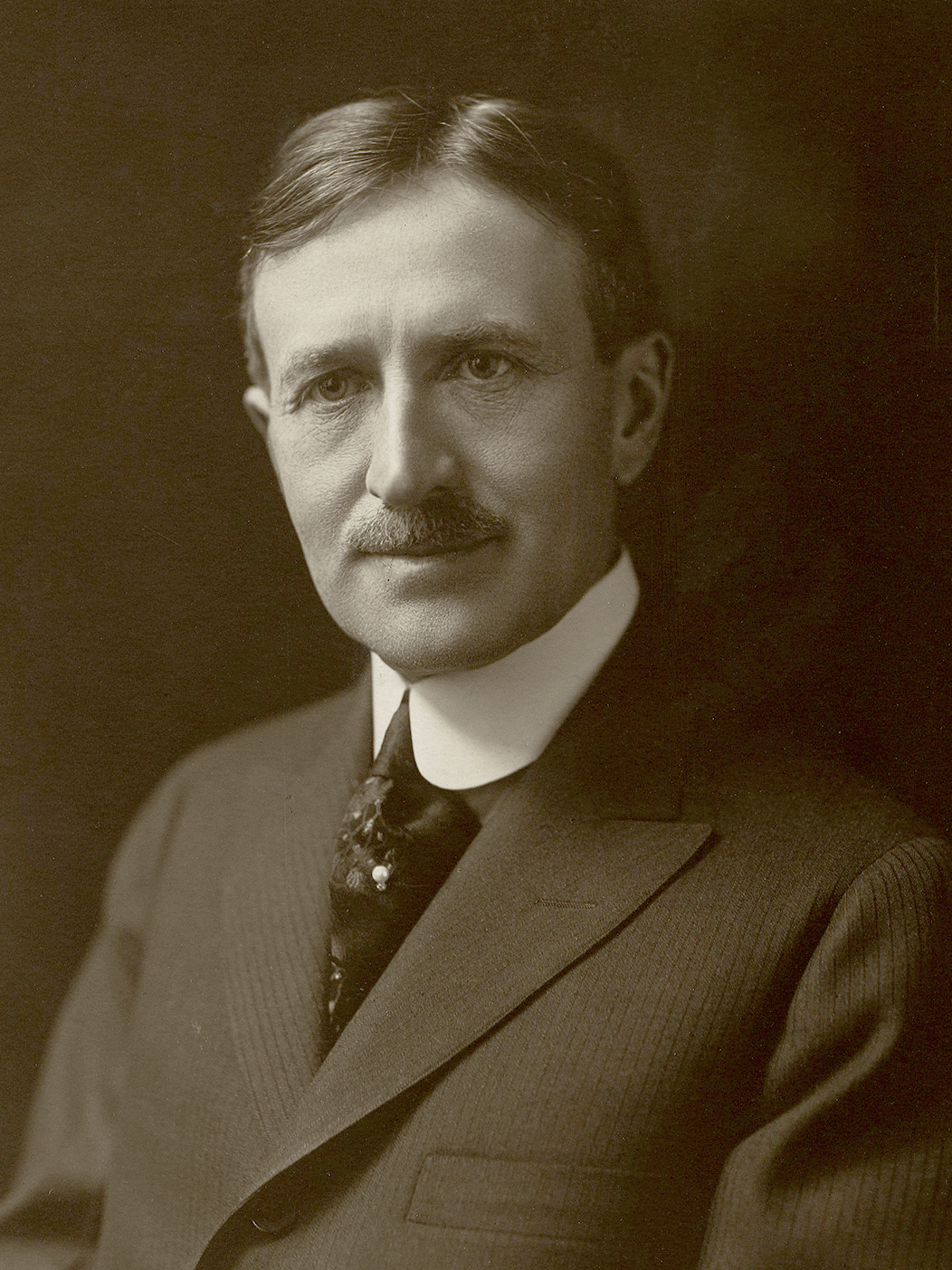
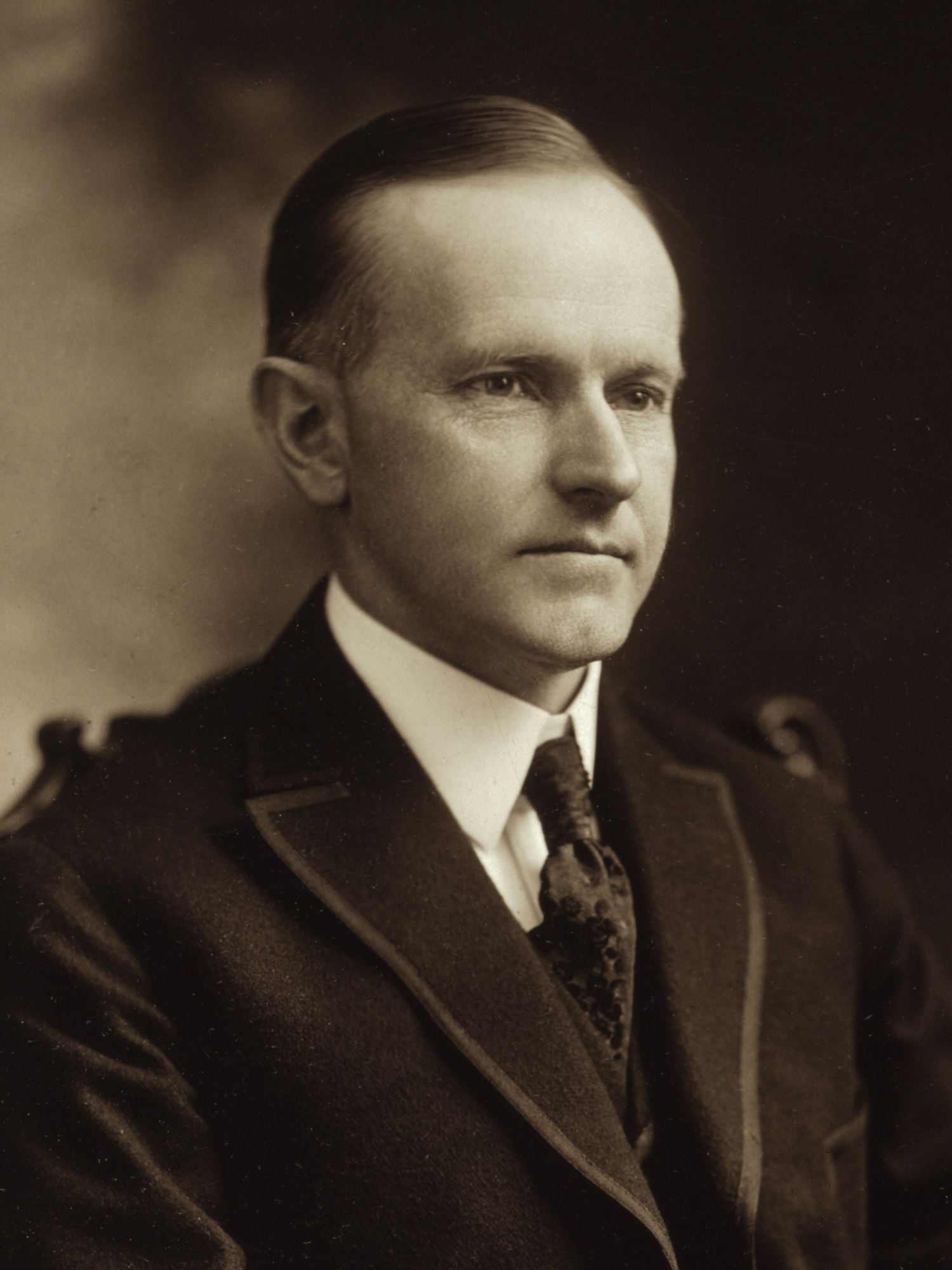
- Harvey S. Firestone (left) gave Billy to Calvin Coolidge (right), who donated Billy to the National Zoo.

In 1927, Harvey S. Firestone, the founder of the Firestone Tire and Rubber Company, acquired Billy in Liberia, where he was captured on one of Firestone Tires' large plantations. Calvin Coolidge, who was the U.S. president at the time, was known for his collection of animals, including many dogs, birds, a wallaby, lion cubs, a raccoon and other unusual animals. At the time, pygmy hippopotamuses were virtually unknown in the United States. On May 26, 1927, Coolidge was informed that he would receive the rare hippopotamus, already adult-sized at 6 feet (1.8 m) long and around 600 pounds (270 kg), as a gift.

In Coolidge's autobiography he wrote about the unusual menagerie he collected and stated that he donated many of these animals, including Billy, to the National Zoo. Though Coolidge had a deep fascination with animals, he was overshadowed by Theodore Roosevelt, who was more widely known for and associated with his interest in animals. By August 1927, Coolidge had sent the second largest collection of animals of any president after Roosevelt to the zoo, and paid them frequent visits. Upon his arrival, Billy was one of the most-valuable animals the zoo had ever received; there were only eight other pygmy hippopotamus in the country. Billy was a popular animal, and several months after his arrival, The New York Times wrote Billy was "as frisky as a dog. Even the antics of the monkeys go unobserved when the keeper opens the tiny hippo's cage and cuts up with him."

== Parenting troubles ==
Today, pygmy hippopotamuses breed well in captivity: since Billy's arrival, 58 pygmy hippopotamuses have been born at the National Zoo alone. As one of the earliest pygmy hippos in captivity in the U.S. zoo system, Billy went on to become the direct ancestor of nearly all pygmy hippopotamuses in American zoos. When Billy first came to the zoo, however, keepers did not know much about pygmy hippopotamus husbandry. A mate for Billy, a female named Hannah, was acquired by the zoo on September 4, 1929. Billy's and Hannah's first calf was born on August 26, 1931, but did not survive the week. "Inability to survive the neglect of an errant mother was the cause given for baby Hippo's demise", eulogized The Washington Post. Over the next two years, two more calves would follow, both of which died in infancy. Billy's third calf was killed when Hannah rolled on top of the baby and crushed it. "She's just a bad mother", said the zoo's long-time director William M. Mann to The Washington Post, upon the death of the third infant.

As Hannah's fourth pregnancy progressed, zookeepers noticed she seemed to be less agitated than previous pregnancies and attributed this to their new quarters: during her previous three pregnancies, Hannah had lived in the zoo's lion house, a stressful environment for a pregnant hippo. On Mother's Day of 1938, Hannah gave birth to a healthy baby.

== Life as a stud ==
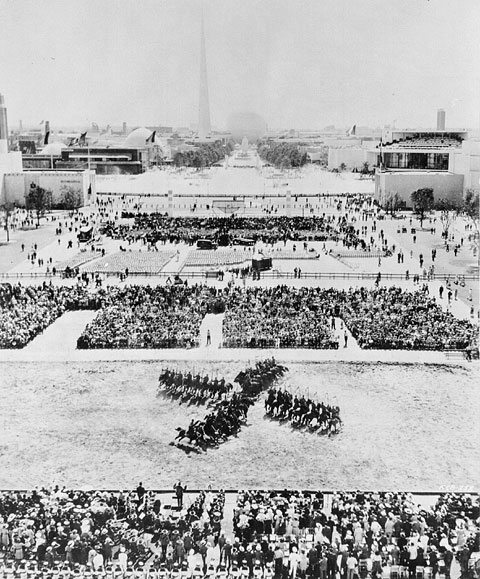
Billy attended the 1939 New York World's Fair.

Such was Billy's popularity in the 1930s that at the end of the decade he traveled to Queens, New York, for the 1939 New York World's Fair, where he appeared in the Firestone exhibit. Billy and Hannah successfully had more calves, and because of Billy's worth as a breeding stud, Mann traveled with the Smithsonian-Firestone Expedition to Liberia in 1940 and acquired a second mate for Billy, another female who came to be known as Matilda.

Between 1931 and 1954, Hannah gave birth to 15 of Billy's calves, seven of whom were reared or lived at least one year. Between 1943 and 1956, Matilda gave birth to eight of Billy's calves, 6 of which were reared. At some point during the 1940s, the press started to refer to Billy as William Johnson Hippopotamus. The zoo developed the tradition of naming all his calves Gumdrop, using Roman numerals to distinguish them. By the birth of Gumdrop XVI, the zoo had noticed something curious: of all Billy's calves, only one was male. Research would later confirm that pygmy hippos in captivity are far more likely to give birth to females, though not by such an extreme ratio as Billy. Twenty-three years after Coolidge's death (January 5, 1933) Billy himself died on October 11, 1955, five months before the birth of Gumdrop XVIII. "He carried his work on to the end", said a zoo official. Hannah followed Billy in death on March 6, 1958.

== A legacy continued ==
After a year or two at the National Zoo, Billy's offspring were typically sent to other locations. Among the places to which his progeny were transferred were the Cole Bros. Circus, Philadelphia Zoological Gardens, Catskill Game Farm, the Miller Bros. Circus, the Fort Worth Zoo, and international destinations such as Sydney and London. In 1960, after learning that the zoo's female pygmy hippos remained without male companionship after Billy's death, Liberian President William Tubman dispatched a search party to find a new male pygmy hippopotamus to ship to Washington. The pygmy hippopotamus, named Totota, arrived in Brooklyn, New York, on February 4, 1960, and traveled via station wagon to Washington the next day, where he would continue Billy's breeding legacy with the zoo's female pygmy hippopotamuses, two of which were Billy's daughters. The National Zoo transferred out their last pygmy hippopotamus in 2009 to make way for their new elephant exhibit.

== See also ==
- List of individual hippopotamids
- United States presidential pets
