= Haggis (pygmy hippo) =

Scottish pygmy hippopotamus (born 2024)

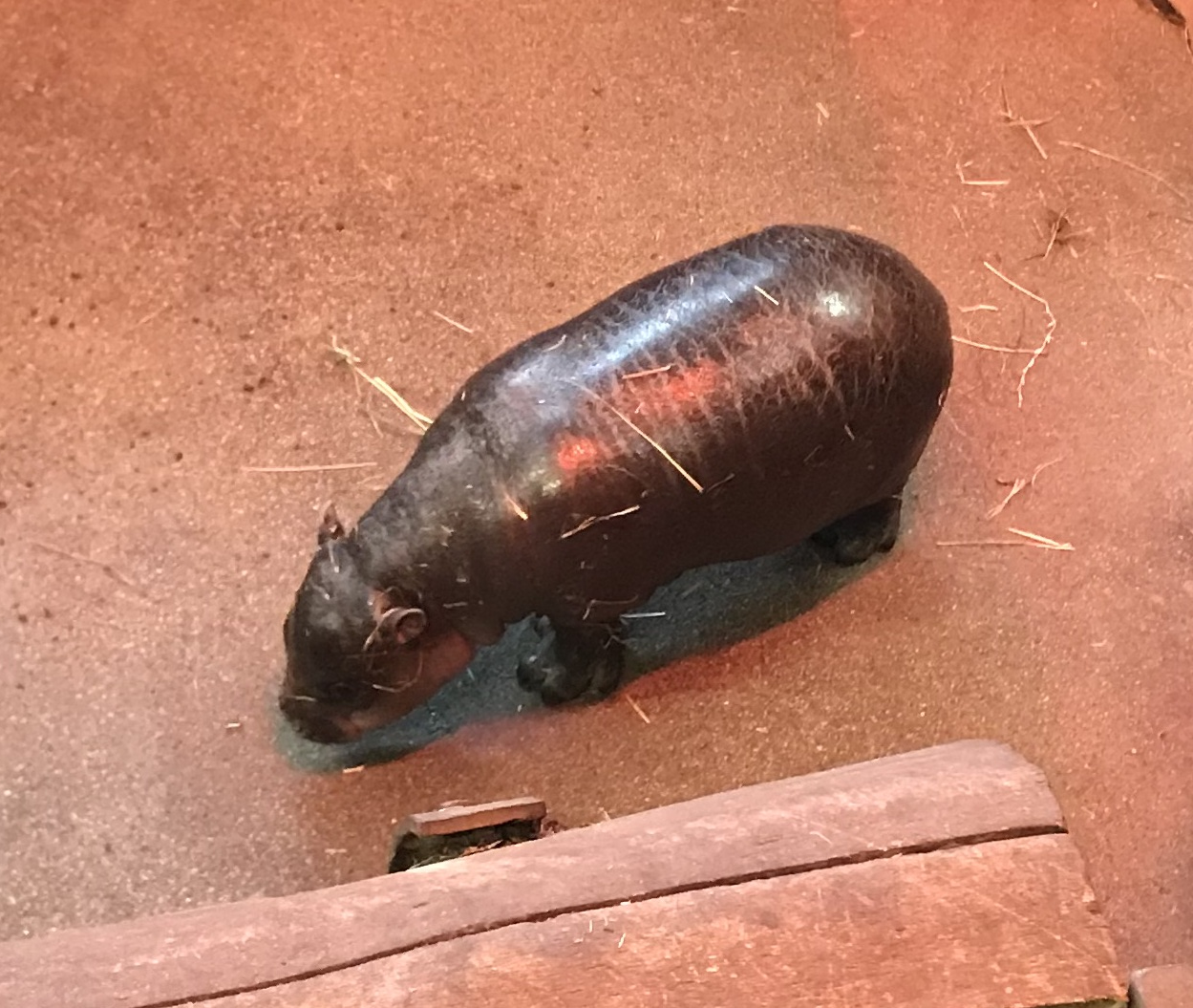
- Haggis in December 2024
- Species: Pygmy hippopotamus (Choeropsis liberiensis)
- Sex: Female
- Born: 30 October 2024 (age 2); Edinburgh Zoo, Edinburgh, Scotland
- Residence: Wingham Wildlife Park, Wingham, England
- Parents: Otto (father); Gloria (mother)
- Named after: Haggis

Haggis (born 30 October 2024) is a pygmy hippopotamus currently living at Wingham Wildlife Park in Wingham, England. She achieved online popularity soon after her birth due to a comedic rivalry with fellow pygmy hippopotamus Moo Deng at Khao Kheow Open Zoo in Si Racha, Chonburi, Thailand.

== Life ==
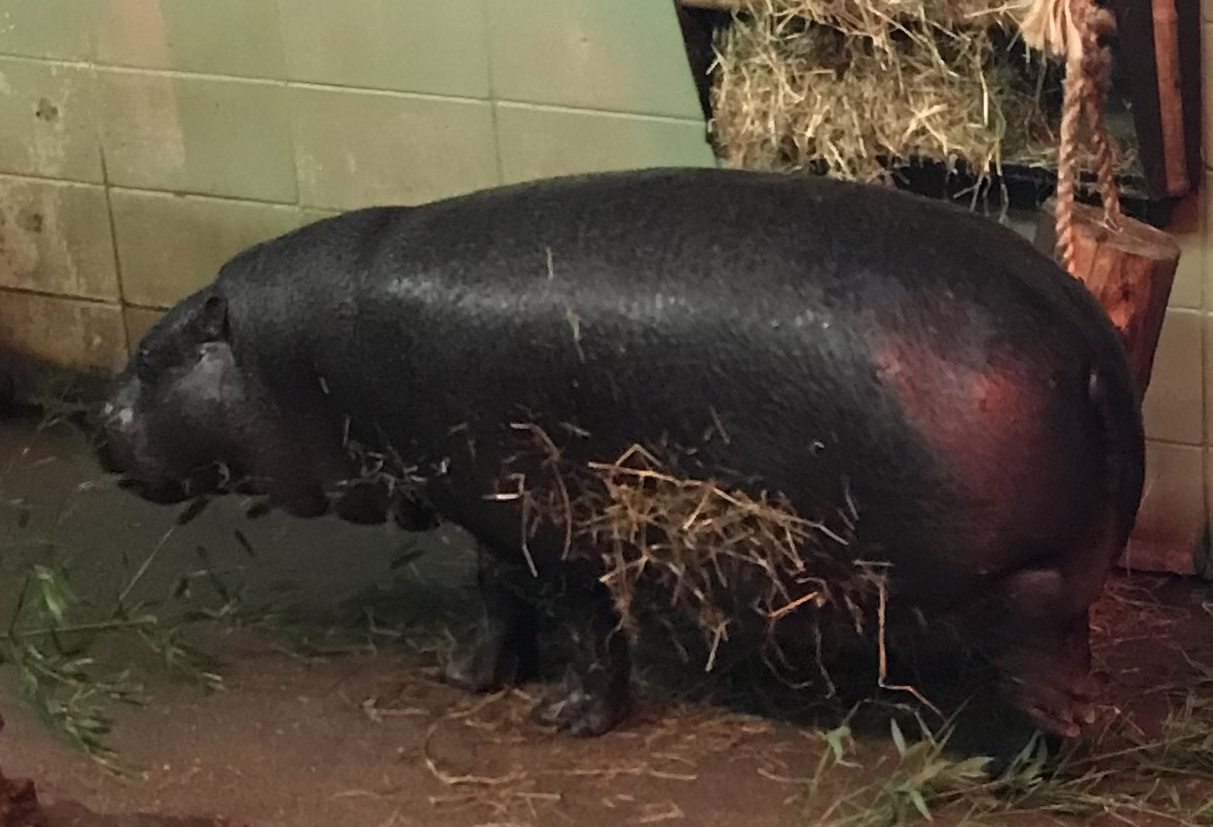
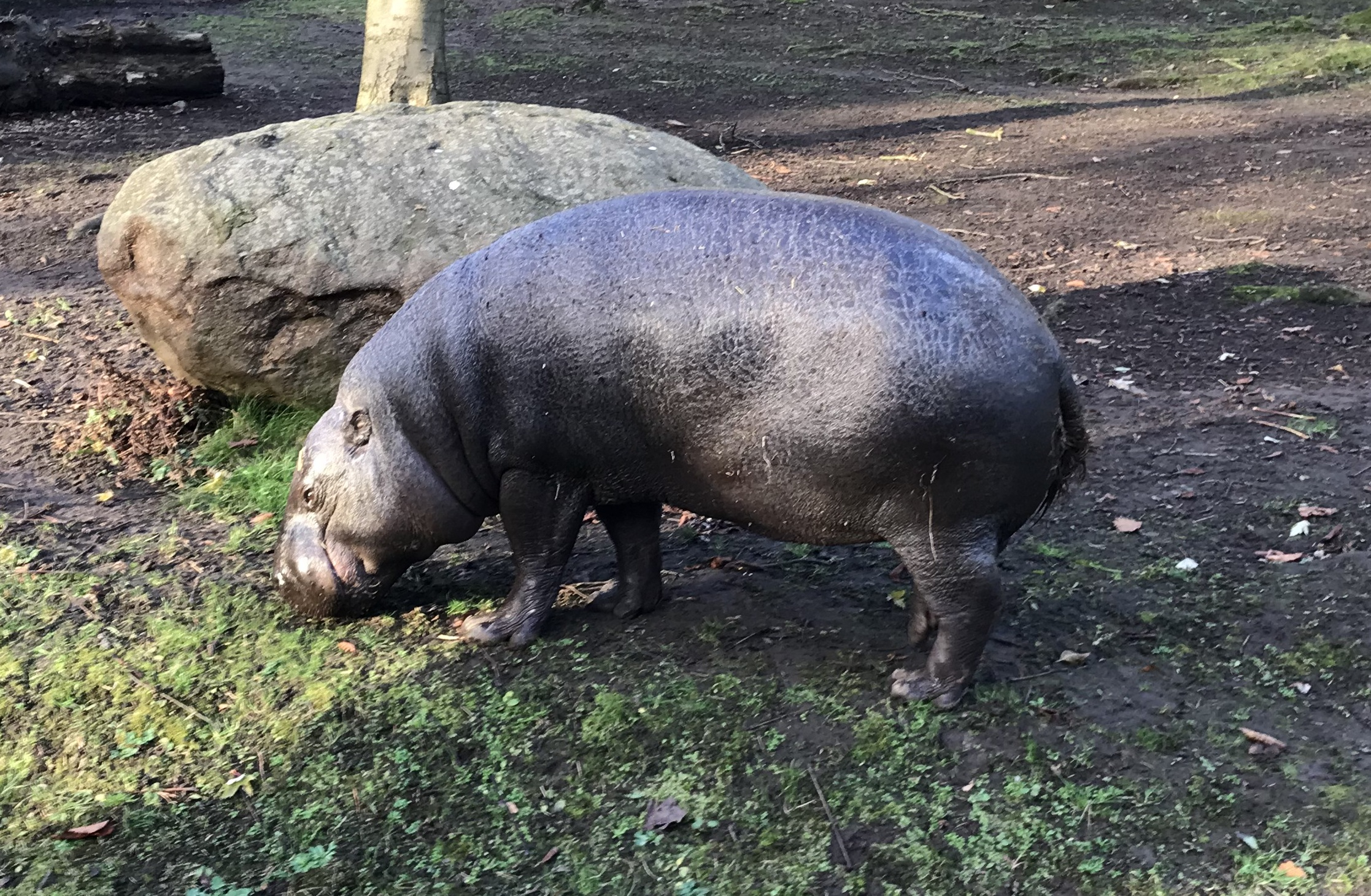
Haggis's parents Gloria (left) and Otto (right) in December 2024

Haggis was born on 30 October 2024 at Edinburgh Zoo to parents Gloria and Otto. She has two full sisters; Amara (born 2021), who lives at London Zoo as part of a breeding programme, and Piper (born 2026), who lives at Edinburgh Zoo with Gloria and Otto. She was named after the Scottish food dish haggis.

Edinburgh Zoo's pygmy hippopotamus house was closed for the first 30 days of her life to ensure safe development in infancy. It reopened to visitors at the end of November and Haggis was described by the zoo as becoming "bolder each day and spending more time exploring inside". On 14 November, Haggis weighed 10.4 kg (22.93 lb), having doubled in size over a two-week period. Soon after, Haggis began daily swimming sessions in her inside pool.

By 21 January 2025, Haggis's weight had increased to around 20 kg (44.09 lb). Two months later, after temperatures had reached 10 °C (50 °F), Haggis was allowed outside of the hippo house. In April 2025, she was introduced to her father Otto: they were previously kept separate to emulate the natural behaviour of pygmy hippos.

In October 2025, Haggis was moved to Wingham Wildlife Park in Kent.

== Online popularity ==
Haggis received online attention within a week of her birth due to comparisons with Moo Deng, a pygmy hippopotamus at Khao Kheow Open Zoo in Thailand who had previously gone viral. Edinburgh Zoo's birth announcement on 4 November 2024 made direct reference to Moo Deng and was seen as creating a rivalry between the two. They made a joke notes app apology later that day. The following week, the rivalry was referenced during a Weekend Update sketch on Saturday Night Live, with segment host Colin Jost referring to Haggis as "fugly as hell".

Haggis was described by Edinburgh Zoo's hoofstock team leader as Scotland's "own little ambassador" for pygmy hippos.

== See also ==
- List of individual hippopotamids
- Poppy, another pygmy hippo born in 2024
