= Moo Deng =

Thai pygmy hippopotamus (born 2024)

Moo Deng หมูเด้ง
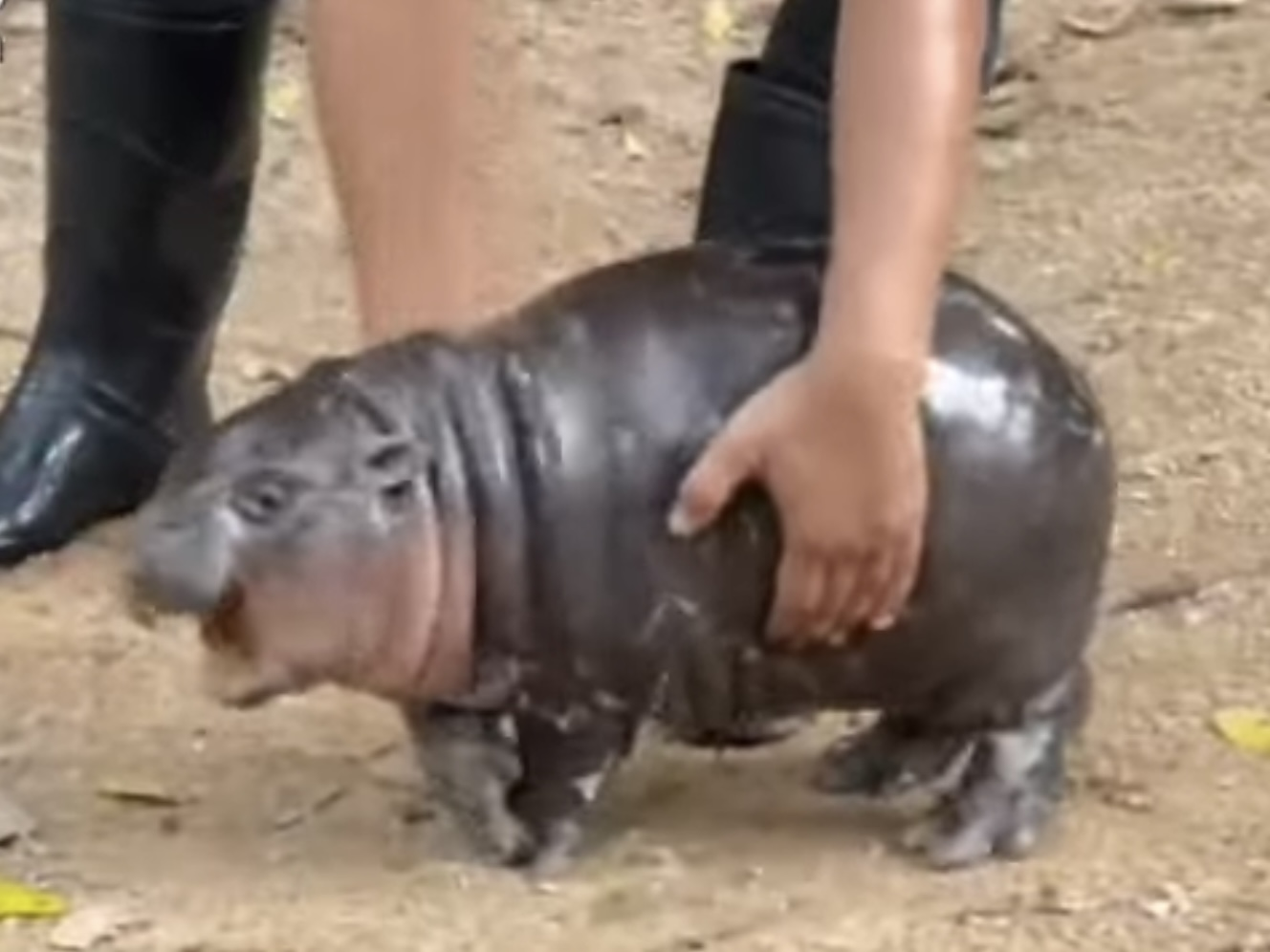
- Moo Deng in 2024
- Species: Pygmy hippopotamus (Choeropsis liberiensis)
- Sex: Female
- Born: 10 July 2024 (age 2)
- Residence: Khao Kheow Open Zoo, Si Racha, Chonburi, Thailand
- Parents: Jonah (mother); Tony (father)
- Named after: Thai term for 'bouncy pork' or 'bouncy pig'

Moo Deng (Thai: หมูเด้ง, RTGS: Mu Deng, Thai pronunciation: [mǔː dêŋ]; born 10 July 2024) is a pygmy hippopotamus residing at Khao Kheow Open Zoo in Si Racha, Chonburi, Thailand. She gained widespread attention as an internet meme at two months old, after photos of her went viral online in September 2024.

== Background ==
Moo Deng was born on 10 July 2024 to parents Tony and Jonah. She has two full siblings (Nadet and Moo Tun) and four half-siblings (Ko, Kanya, Phalo, and Moo Wan). The name Moo Deng was chosen through a public poll, with over 20,000 people voting for it. It translates to 'bouncy pork' or 'bouncy pig' in English.

== Online popularity ==
Thai-language news coverage of Moo Deng in September 2024

Khao Kheow Open Zoo posted images of its pygmy hippopotamuses on its official Facebook page, and Moo Deng quickly became a fan favorite. Moo Deng is noted to be more playful and energetic than other hippopotamuses. In response to her popularity, the zoo began selling clothing and other merchandise featuring designs based on Moo Deng. Moo Deng inspired many pieces of fan art.

Due to Moo Deng's viral online popularity, the number of daily visitors to the zoo doubled in early September 2024. Around this time, some visitors harassed the baby by splashing her with water or throwing objects at her to wake her up. As a result, the Khao Kheow Open Zoo installed security cameras around her enclosure. The zoo director threatened legal action against visitors who harassed her. The misbehavior by some visitors has been widely condemned online. The zoo also implemented a five-minute time limit for visitors in order to accommodate the high volume.

In September 2024, zoo director Narongwit Chodchoi announced that the zoo had begun the process of copyrighting and trademarking "Moo Deng the hippo" to raise funds for the zoo. The zoo also plans to launch a continuous livestream to allow fans to watch Moo Deng live over the Internet.

On 28 September, Moo Deng was the subject of a Saturday Night Live sketch. She was parodied by Bowen Yang on Weekend Update, and the character was used to satirize American pop-artist Chappell Roan's commentary on fame and political endorsements.

In November 2024, the zoo posted a video showing Moo Deng choosing between two carved fruit dishes featuring the names of Donald Trump and Kamala Harris in what the zoo said was a prediction on who would win the 2024 United States presidential election. Moo Deng selected the fruit engraved with Trump's name, a prediction that ultimately came true. That same month, GMM Grammy released an official Moo Deng theme song composed by Mueanphet Ammara titled "Moodeng Moodeng!" in Thai, English, Chinese, and Japanese. In December 2024, Google published a year-in-review-themed Google Doodle video about the most searched topics of that year, with Moo Deng featuring in it.

In February 2025, the coordinator for the Taï Hippo Project in Côte d’Ivoire, Elie Bogui, reported that while the meme has gone viral, there had been no significant impact observed in terms of funding for pygmy hippo conservation and protection.

Over 12,000 fans visited the zoo on 10 July 2025 to celebrate Moo Deng's first birthday.

== Welfare concerns ==
Animal welfare groups have expressed concern for Moo Deng. A spokesperson for People for the Ethical Treatment of Animals (PETA) said, "She faces a lifetime of confinement," while World Animal Protection said, "Sharing Moo Deng content might seem innocuous, but it promotes cruelty to animals." The zoo's director, Narongwit Chodchoi, rejected the allegations and maintained that the facility ensures the welfare and quality of life for more than 2,000 animals. The Thai Society for the Prevention of Cruelty to Animals said that Moo Deng was well taken care of and that PETA was relying on "outdated" information.

== See also ==
- List of individual hippopotamids
- Mae Mali, another hippo that has been famous in Thailand for a long time
- Haggis, a baby pygmy hippo born in Scotland in 2024
- Poppy, a pygmy hippo born in Virginia in 2024
- Hua Hua, a baby panda that gained online popularity in 2024
- Jimothy, a raccoon that gained online popularity in 2026
- Knut, a baby polar bear that gained online popularity
- Pesto, a baby penguin that gained online popularity in September 2024
- Punch, a baby Japanese Macaque that gained viral attention for his attachment to a large orangutan stuffed toy
- Fiona, another hippo that gained online popularity
- Mars, pygmy hippopotamus born in Kansas in 2025
