= Tanganyika Wildlife Park =

Zoo and wildlife park in Kansas, United States

- Interactive map of Tanganyika Wildlife Park
- 37.6727°N 97.5562°W
- Date opened: August 2, 2008 (to public)
- Location: Goddard, Kansas, United States
- Land area: 51 acre
- No. of animals: 400+ animals (100+ species)
- Memberships: Accredited by the Zoological Association of America (ZAA) and certified by American Humane ConservationProgram
- Owner: Fouts family (founders Jim and Sherri Fouts, family-owned)
- Website: twpark.com

Tanganyika Wildlife Park is a privately-owned zoological park and wildlife attraction located in Goddard, Kansas, United States. The park was founded by Jim and Sherri Fouts.

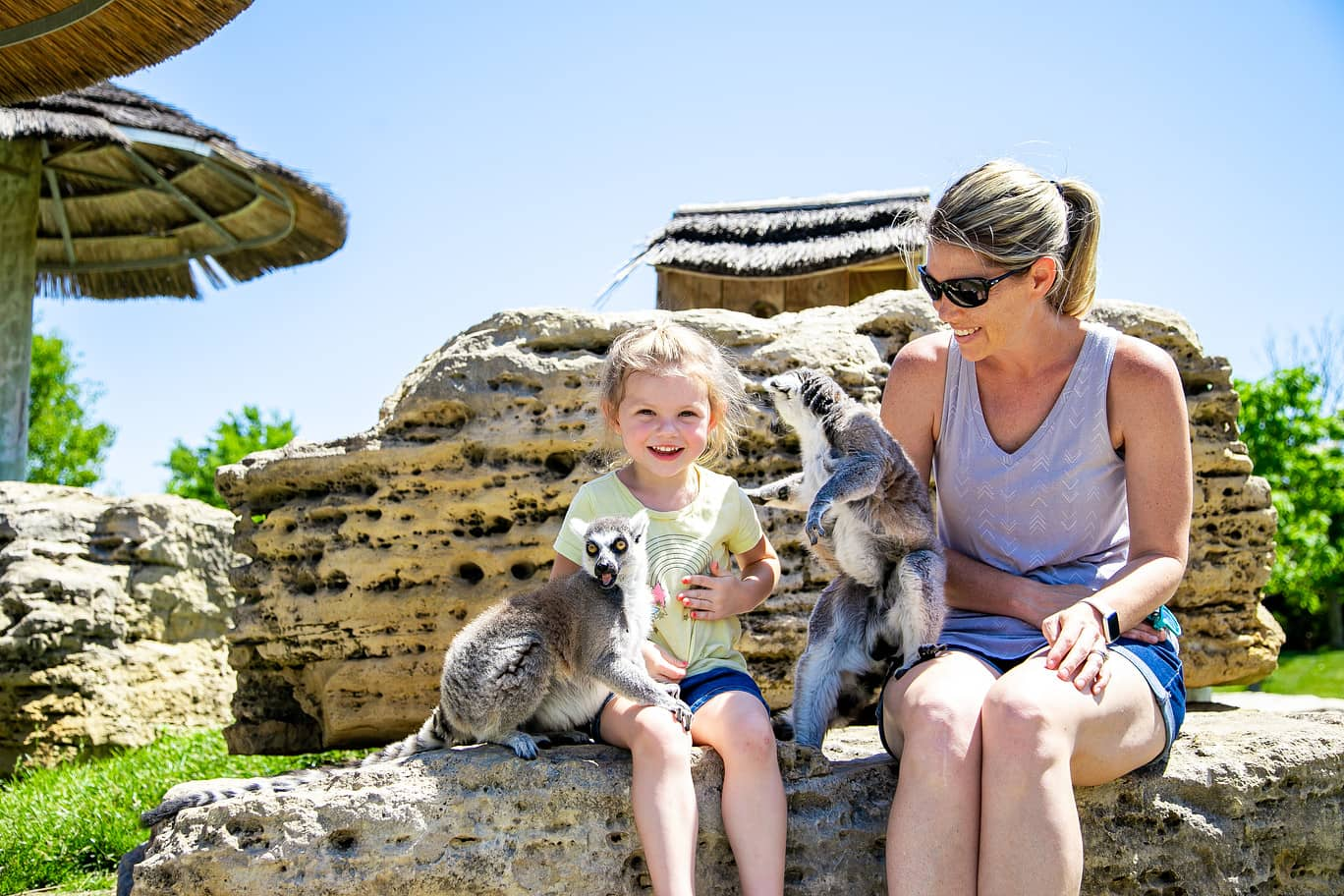
One of eight interactive feeding experiences at Tanganyika Wildlife Park.

== History ==
Jim Fouts began working with animals as a night‐keeper at the Sedgwick County Zoo in 1972, then moved into importing and breeding exotic birds and animals. His first trip was to Ecuador, Argentina, and Bolivia acquiring birds and primates for an importer in Florida. Later he his own business and started working in Africa working to set up new lines of export in countries like Sudan and Tanzania.

Next Fouts moved to California and established a USDA quarantine facility and bird store. After a few years, Jim and Sherri moved home to Kansas. In 1985, the Fouts family was gifted five acres of land in Goddard, Kansas, by Sherri's parent's Norma and Kell Hawkins. They built their first barn and founded what would become Tanganyika Wildlife Park.

At first they only did tours in their backyard, but on August 2, 2008 the park officially opened to the public with 15 exhibits and 3 interactive stations.

== Operations ==
Tanganyika Wildlife Park maintains a collection of over 100 animal species and over 500 animals and offers structured programs that allow visitors to interact with animals in controlled environments.

In 2025, the park introduced an all-inclusive pricing model in which admission includes food, beverages, and select animal experiences. This approach differs from the traditional à la carte pricing model used by many zoological parks.

== Penguin swim experience ==
Tanganyika Wildlife Park offers an interactive program in which participants enter a controlled pool environment alongside African penguins (Spheniscus demersus). The experience is conducted under staff supervision and allows visitors to observe the animals at close range.

The program has been referenced in local media coverage as one of the park’s notable visitor experiences and has been included in broader reporting on the park’s interactive approach to animal encounters.

African penguins are classified as endangered by the International Union for Conservation of Nature (IUCN) and are part of cooperative breeding programs in zoological institutions.

== Key Dates ==
History and Key Dates

- 1985 - First barn built on the site that would become Tanganyika Wildlife Park
- 1989 - Benny, the last living mascot of the Cincinnati Bengals, and Shubra, a pure white female, have their first litter of tiger cubs.
- 1994 - Jim and Sherri acquire additional 70 acres of land in 1994 and build multiple new barns to accommodate collection of nearly 150 animals
- 2000 - Private tours begin in what is technically the Fouts Family backyard.
- 2008 - Tanganyika Wildlife Park officially opened on August 2^{nd}, 2008
- 2014 – The African penguin swimming experience opened.
- 2016 – The first litter of cheetahs are born at Tanganyika.
- May 2017 – Nessie, the first baby pygmy hippo in Kansas, was born.
- June 2017 – Tanganyika becomes Humane Certified™ by American Humane
- 2017 – The 50th baby giraffe is born at Tanganyika.
- 2018 – Wichita's convention and visitors bureau, Visit Wichita, awarded Jim Fouts with the Lifetime Achievement Award.
- 2021 - Tanganyika Falls a splash park opens at Tanganyika
- 2023 - Indian rhino calf born at Tanganyika. First born to a mother conceived by AI.
- 2024 - Tanganyika named one of the best animal encounters in the U.S. by Newsweek
- 2025 - Tanganyika launches a new model (breakfast, lunch, snacks, fountain drinks, and unlimited animal feedings are all included in admission)
- 2025 - Jim Fouts is awarded the Lifetime Achievement award by the Zoological Association of America.

== Media coverage ==
Tanganyika Wildlife Park has received regional and national media attention, particularly in connection with animal births and individual animals.

In 2025, the birth of a pygmy hippopotamus named Mars drew widespread attention after a video featuring the animal went viral. The story was covered by national broadcast programs including Good Morning America and ABC World News Tonight, as well as regional outlets.

The animal was also referenced in coverage by National Geographic, which discussed increased public interest in pygmy hippopotamuses in zoological settings.

Local news outlets have also reported on animal births and park developments, including giraffes, cheetahs, and penguins.

== See also ==
- List of zoos in the United States
- Zoological Association of America
- American Humane Conservation Certification
- Mars (pygmy hippo)
