= Obaysch =

Captive hippopotamus at the London Zoo (1850–1878)

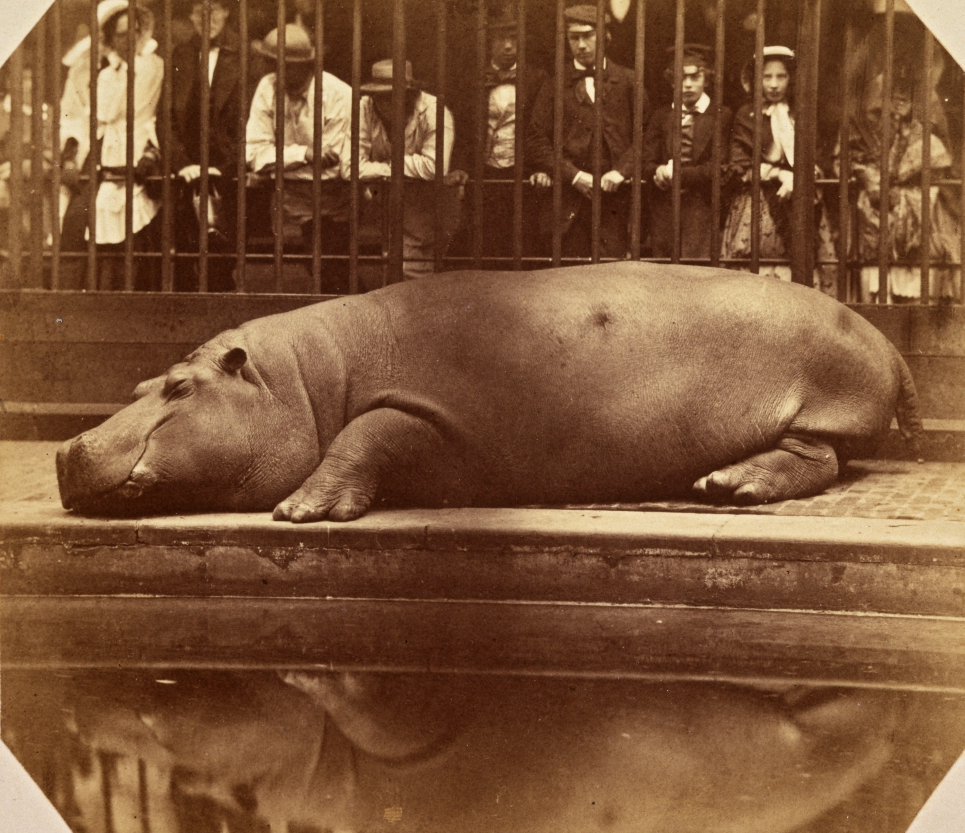
Crowds look on as Obaysch rests in the London Zoo in this 1852 photograph taken by Juan, Count of Montizón.

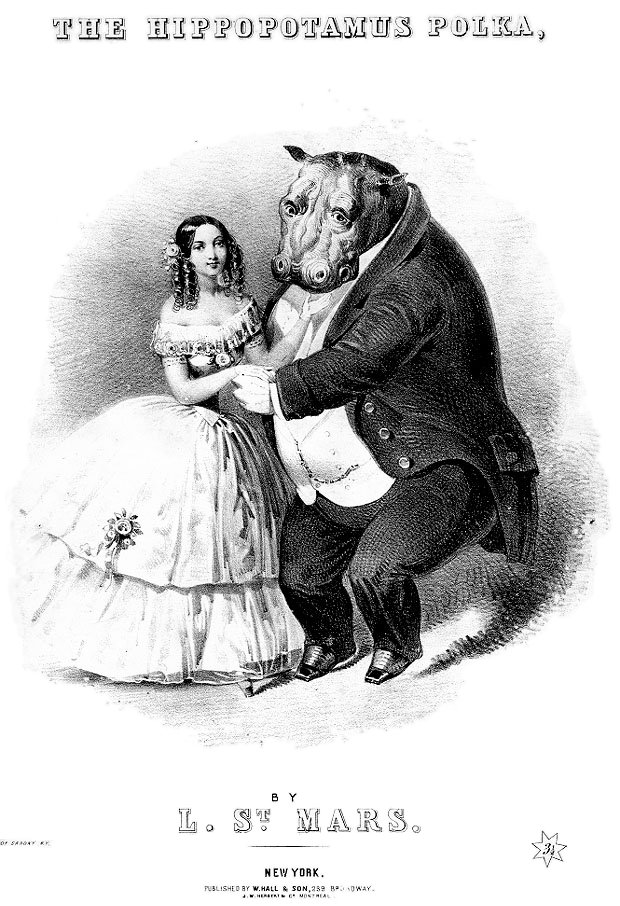
Hippopotamus Polka sheet-music cover

Obaysch (c. 1849 – 11 March 1878) was the first hippopotamus seen in Great Britain since prehistoric times, and the first in Europe since Ancient Rome. He was captured on an island on the White Nile when he was less than one year old. His name is derived from the name of the island.

The Ottoman Viceroy of Egypt, Abbas Pasha, agreed with the British consul general, Sir Charles Murray (later known as "Hippopotamus Murray"), to swap Obaysch and some other exotic animals for some greyhounds and deerhounds. Obaysch was sent by boat down the Nile to Cairo, accompanied by a herd of cows to provide him with milk. He was sent by P&O steamer to Southampton, and he arrived at London Zoo on 25 May 1850. He was an instant sensation in London, attracting up to 10,000 visitors each day, and spawning a trade in hippo memorabilia and even a Hippopotamus Polka (by L. St. Mars). The number of visitors to the Zoo in 1850 was double the previous year.

Abbas Pasha sent a second hippo to London, a female named Adhela who arrived on 22 July 1854. After a wait of over 16 years, the pair finally produced offspring in 1871, but the calf died after 2 days. A second calf died the following year, but a third, born on 5 November 1872, survived. It was a female named Guy Fawkes. Adhela survived Obaysch by four years, dying on 16 December 1882. Guy Fawkes died on 20 March 1908.

Obaysch once escaped from captivity in London Zoo and according to legend a keeper was used as bait to lure him back into his enclosure.

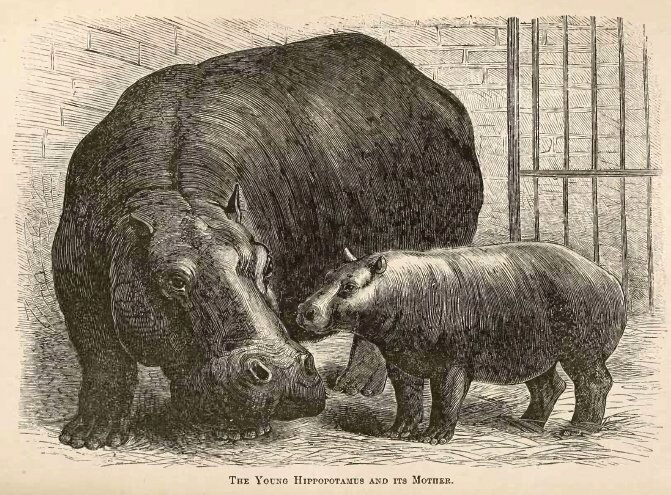
Adhela and Guy Fawkes

== See also ==
- List of individual hippopotamids
