= Take Me to Mars =

Take Me to Mars is a 2026 American documentary film about Mars, a pygmy hippopotamus born at Tanganyika Wildlife Park in Goddard, Kansas. The documentary follows Mars during his first year of life and the keepers, veterinarians and conservationists involved in his care.

The film was directed by Valentina Essus and Eduardo Ravanal, with Peter Murphy Lewis serving as executive producer and narrator. It was filmed at Tanganyika Wildlife Park in October 2025 and has a runtime of approximately 50 minutes.

== Premise ==
Mars was born at Tanganyika Wildlife Park on June 26, 2025. The documentary follows his development during his first year and explores the work of the animal care team, the park's conservation efforts and the people behind Tanganyika Wildlife Park.

The film also documents the period following Mars's rise to online popularity after videos of the young pygmy hippo attracted widespread attention.

== Release ==
Take Me to Mars had a private premiere for Tanganyika Wildlife Park staff and families in Wichita, Kansas, on August 19, 2026.
