= Poppy (pygmy hippopotamus) =

American pygmy hippopotamus (born 2024)

- Species: Choeropsis liberiensis
- Sex: Female
- Born: December 9, 2024 (age 22 months); Mosely, Virginia, United States
- Parents: Iris and Cowan

Poppy (born December 9, 2024) is a pygmy hippopotamus from the Metro Richmond Zoo in Virginia. She is cousins with Moo Deng, another pygmy hippopotamus who also went viral online during the same year.

== Life ==
At her birth in December 2024, she weighed 15 pounds. She was born underwater, being the first of Iris' calves to do so. A vote was held on what to name her. After receiving over 116,000 votes, the name Poppy was chosen, with Hammie Mae coming in second. In January 2025, the zoo started the online "Poppy Cam" livestream. She was moved to the Hippo Haven habitat in March.

== See also ==
- Haggis (pygmy hippo)
- Mars (pygmy hippo)
