= Fiona (hippopotamus) =

Hippo at the Cincinnati Zoo (2017–2026)

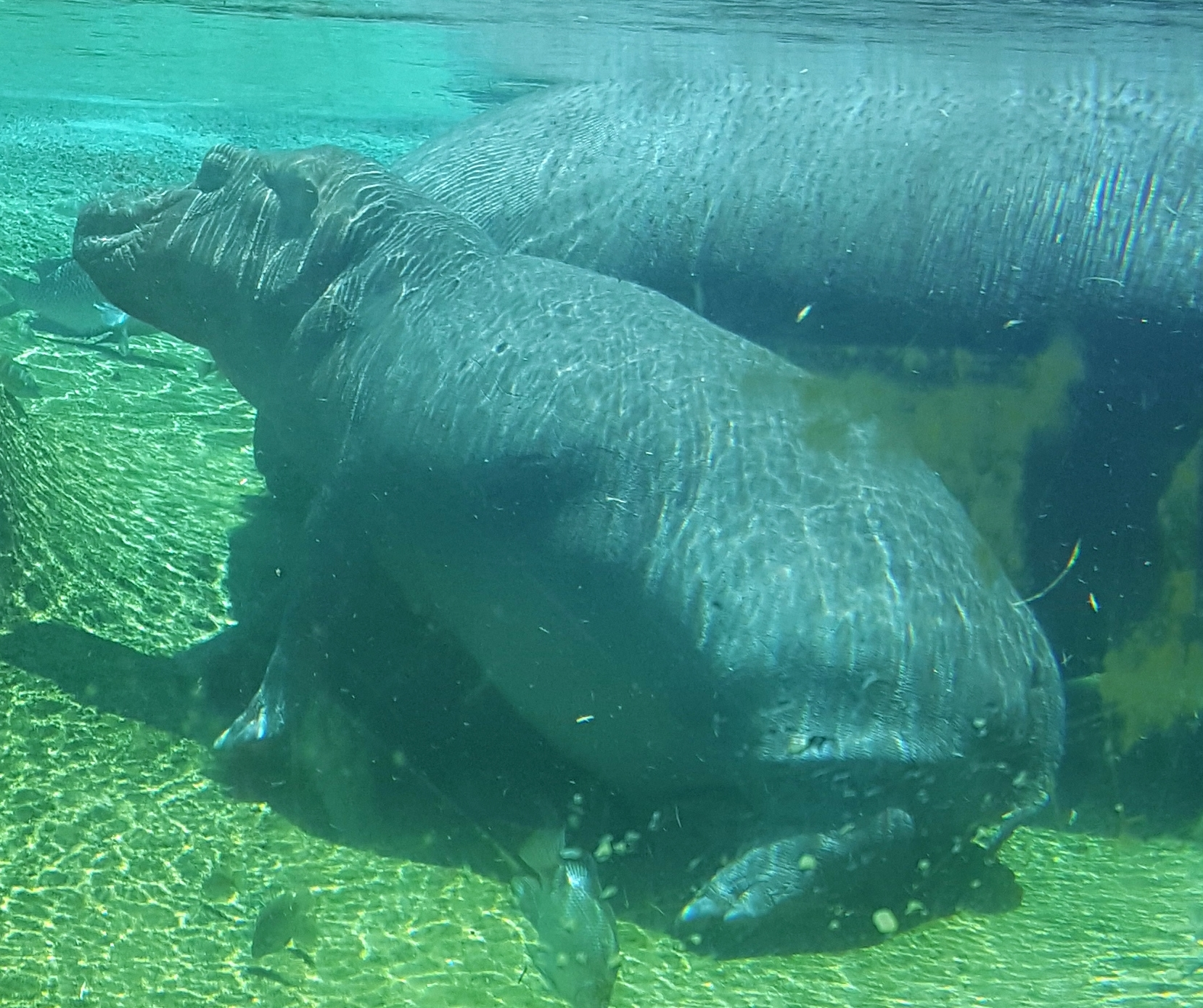
- Fiona (left) with her mother Bibi (right) in May 2018
- Species: Common hippopotamus (Hippopotamus amphibius)
- Sex: Female
- Born: January 24, 2017; Cincinnati, Ohio, U.S.
- Died: November 19, 2026 (aged 9); Cincinnati, Ohio, U.S.
- Residence: Cincinnati Zoo and Botanical Garden
- Parents: Bibi; Henry
- Mate: Tucker
- Named after: Princess Fiona

Fiona (January 24, 2017 – November 19, 2026) was a female hippopotamus who lived at the Cincinnati Zoo and Botanical Garden in Cincinnati, Ohio, United States. She was the first Nile hippo imaged on ultrasound prenatally, as well the first Nile hippo to be born at the Cincinnati Zoo in over fifty years. She was born six weeks premature and was not expected to survive. After a weeks-long effort by a team of veterinarians and clinicians from the Cincinnati Children's Hospital contributed to her care, Fiona survived. Videos of Fiona became popular on the Internet and her presence increased attendance at the zoo.

Fiona died in 2026 after complications from ingesting a visitor's knit hat that had entered her enclosure.

== Early life ==
Fiona's parents were Henry and Bibi, who was 17 when she became pregnant with Fiona. She was the first Nile hippopotamus to be born at the Cincinnati Zoo in 53 years, and was the first of the species to be scanned in the womb using ultrasound.

Six weeks before Fiona was due, Bibi showed signs of going into labor. Fiona was born six weeks premature on January 24, 2017, with a birth weight of 29 pounds (13 kg); the recorded range of birth weights for the species at that time was 55–120 pounds (25–54 kg). Zoo staff named the baby hippo Fiona because her ears resembled those of the Shrek character.

Veterinarians did not expect Fiona to survive. She was unable to stand and required bottle feeding with milk from her mother, supplemented with infant formula. This was the first time a hippopotamus had been milked and the milk analyzed. The following month, while teething, she began refusing her bottle and became dehydrated; a catheter for the delivery of intravenous fluids was inserted with the assistance of members of the vascular access team at Cincinnati Children's Hospital. The preemie team had previously sent the zoo a care package for her.

Fiona took her first steps on February 5, weighed 275 pounds (125 kg) by May 31 when she was introduced to the media, and by June had reached a normal weight of 317 pounds (144 kg). By the time she was six months old, she weighed over 375 pounds (170 kg), and in late August, 451 pounds (205 kg). On her first birthday, January 24, 2018, she weighed more than 655 pounds (297 kg). By December 26, 2018, she weighed slightly over 1,000 pounds (450 kg); on her third birthday in January 2020, 1,300 pounds (590 kg), and on her fourth birthday in 2021, 1,600 pounds (730 kg).

== Later life ==
Fiona was used to predict the result of the Super Bowl each year since her birth, by choosing between enrichment items with the two teams' emblems. She chose the winning team in 2018, chose incorrectly in 2019, and in 2020 vomited on the item representing the Kansas City Chiefs, who would win that year.

Fiona's father Henry died at 36 in October 2017. In September 2021, an 18-year-old male hippo named Tucker was moved from the San Francisco Zoo to the Cincinnati Zoo as part of the Association of Zoos and Aquariums' Hippo Species Survival Plan. Tucker was slowly introduced to Fiona and Bibi, with hopes that Tucker would be a suitable mate for Bibi.

On August 3, 2022, Fiona's half-brother Fritz, the son of Tucker and Bibi, was born at the Cincinnati Zoo. Fiona and Tucker mated, but due to a contraceptive implant in Fiona, no pregnancy occurred.

== Death ==
On November 8, 2026, Fiona ingested a zoo guest's knit cap. The hat had been tossed into the air in front of Fiona's habitat, and a ceiling fan then launched the hat through a one-foot gap above the viewing windows in front of her enclosure. A Cincinnati Zoo spokesperson later said "We probably couldn't make that happen again if we tried. It was clearly an accident."

On November 16, the Cincinnati Zoo announced the incident and that she was being monitored closely by her care team, which was "cautiously optimistic" that she would pass it and make a full recovery.

The next day, Fiona was sedated for a second time to evaluate her condition. Her care team conducted bloodwork, performed a colonoscopy using a 9-foot scope, and administered a "giant" enema in an effort to facilitate digestion. An ultrasound performed that day showed "bunching" of her intestines, which indicated that Fiona's digestive system was still trying to pass the obstruction. Invasive surgery to manually remove the obstruction was not considered to be a viable option for an adult hippo of her size. Fiona was removed from public exhibition and continued to receive 24-hour care from zoo staff, including fluids, favorite foods, painkillers, antiemetics, and a vibration plate in attempts to help her pass the hat on her own. In her final hours, her care team offered her a sniff of coffee, a scent she had always liked and to which she responded positively.

However, these interventions were unsuccessful, and Fiona died due to complications from ingesting the hat on November 19. The Cincinnati Zoo had released a statement announcing her death, in which her keepers and veterinary staff had asked for privacy. A necropsy revealed that the hat was located in her small intestine, 50 feet (15 m) from the far end of her intestines and 25 feet (7.6 m) beyond her final stomach compartment, and that the location made surgery or active treatment impossible given her size and anatomy.

Her death prompted an outpouring of grief in the Cincinnati community. Hundreds of people came to the zoo to mourn. Some visitors left flowers and other momentos near a statue of Fiona outside the zoo's entrance. Fiona's "long distance boyfriend" Timothy, another hippo who had been playfully sending love letters to Fiona by way of San Antonio Zoo, wrote her one last letter, partially in verse.

Debbie Metzler, managing director of captive wildlife for People for the Ethical Treatment of Animals (PETA) called for the zoo to review its safety protocols and encouraged zoo visitors to secure all loose objects and not to toss objects near animal enclosures.

== In media ==
The Fiona Show was launched on Facebook in August 2017. A video posted on social media by the zoo went viral, as did a couple's photographs of Fiona watching them get engaged in October 2017. In 2017, Cincinnati-based ice cream chain Graeter's released a limited-edition flavor inspired by Fiona called "Chunky Chunky Hippo" and donated a portion of its proceeds to the Cincinnati Zoo. The flavor was temporarily re-released in honor of Fiona's first birthday.

Saving Fiona, a children's book about her written by zoo director Thane Maynard, was published in June 2018. In August 2018 a mural of Fiona was unveiled in downtown Cincinnati; Lucie Rice won the contest to design it. A depiction of Fiona appeared in Cincinnati Ballet's December 2018 production of Nutcracker, played by a 6 ft 4 in (193 cm) dancer, and "stole the show". Illustrator Richard Cowdrey wrote two books about Fiona in 2018 and 2019, including a Christmas book, A Very Fiona Christmas.

The 2020 novel Dungeon Crawler Carl is dedicated to Fiona. Its dedication page reads: "This version of Dungeon Crawler Carl is dedicated to the star of one of the greatest, most inspiring, most amazing survival stories of our time. Fiona. Fiona the Hippo."

== See also ==
- List of individual hippopotamids
- Moo Deng, a pygmy hippopotamus that also gained online popularity
- Harambe, a gorilla at the same zoo whose 2016 death became a cultural phenomenon
