= Khao Kheow Open Zoo =

Zoo in Chonburi, Thailand

Coordinates: 13.214°N 101.060°E

- สวนสัตว์เปิดเขาเขียว
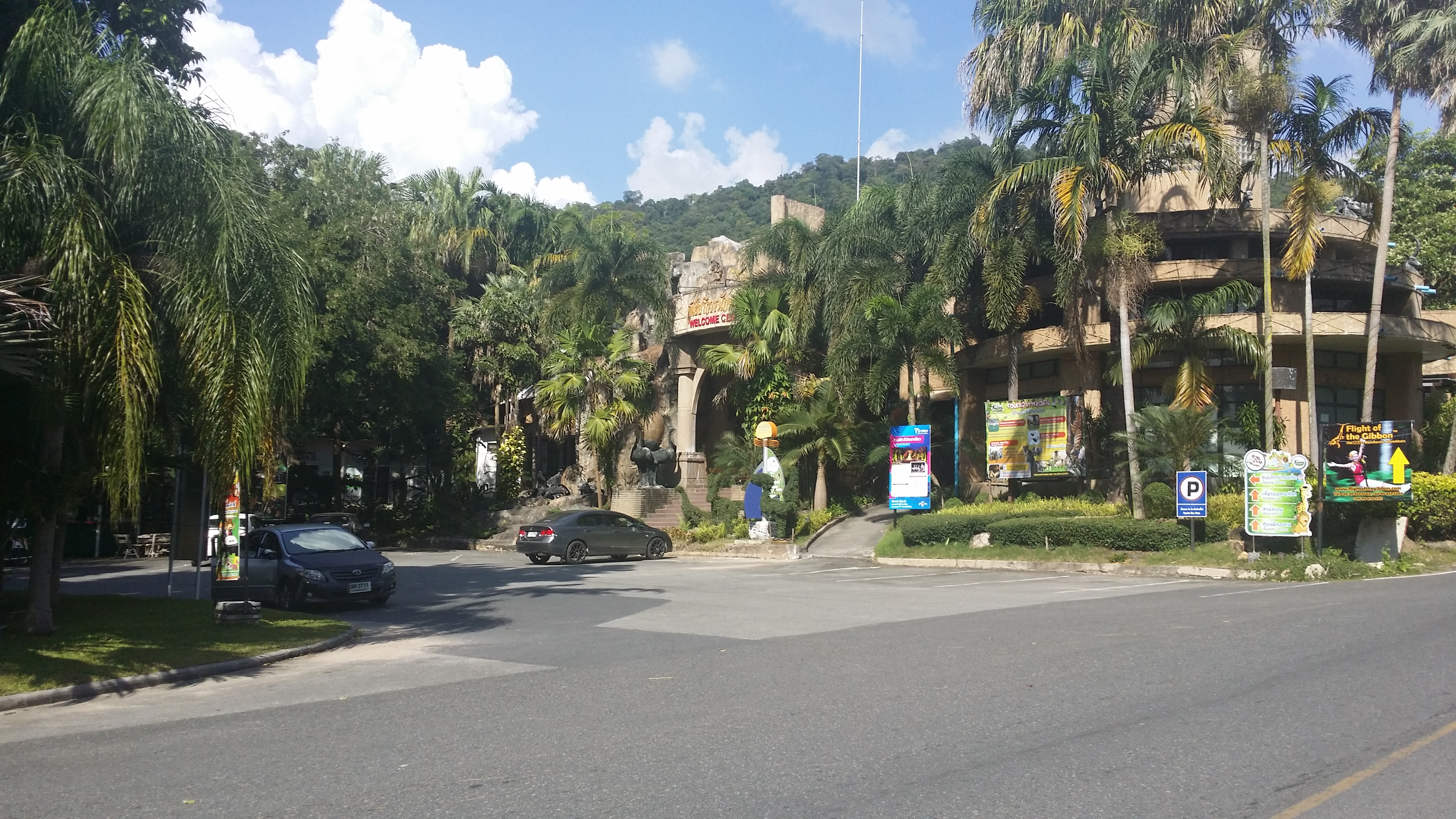
- Zoo entrance
- Interactive map of Khao Kheow Open Zoo
- Date opened: 1978
- Location: Bang Phra, Si Racha, Chonburi, Thailand
- Land area: 1,976 acres (800 ha)
- No. of animals: 8000+
- No. of species: 300+
- Major exhibits: Penguin Parade, Animal Presentation, Journey to the Jungle, Flying Parade, Seal Show
- Owner: Zoological Park Organization
- Website: www.kkopenzoo.com

Khao Kheow Open Zoo (Thai: สวนสัตว์เปิดเขาเขียว, RTGS: Suan Sat Poet Khao Khiao, pronounced [sǔan sàt pɤ̀ːt kʰǎw kʰǐaw]) is a large zoo in Si Racha, Chonburi, Thailand. It covers an area of about 1,976 acres (800 ha) and contains more than 8,000 animals from more than 300 species. It is the second largest zoo in Asia.

One of the zoo's notable animals is a pygmy hippopotamus named Moo Deng.

== History ==
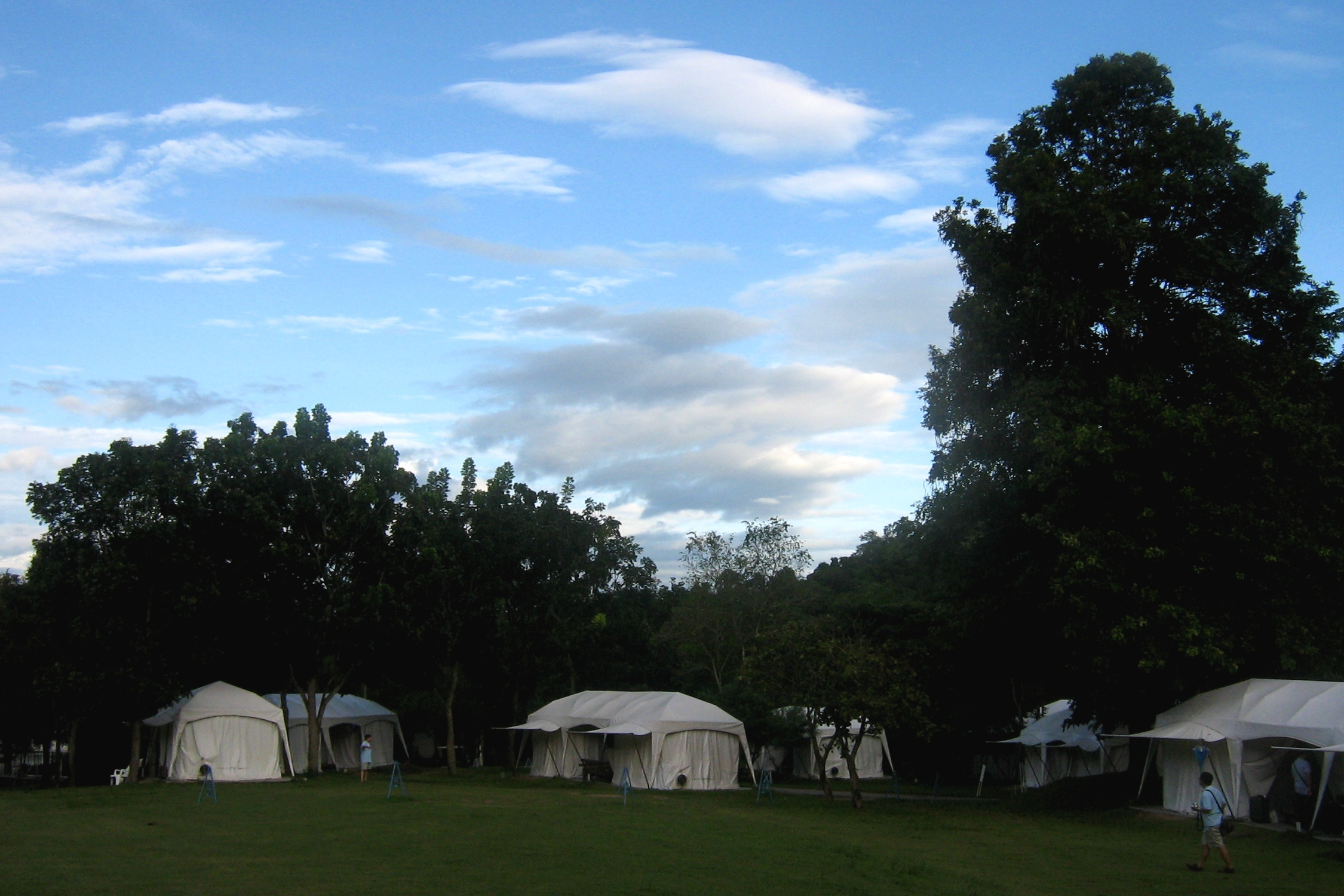
Residence camp inside Khao Kheow Open Zoo

The Khao Kheow Open Zoo was established in 1974 with an area of about 200 acres in the foothills of Khao Kheow Mountain due to the increasing number of animals in the Dusit Zoo.

In 1978, the zoo was opened to the public. In 1984, the Zoological Park Organization under the Ministry of Natural Resources and Environment allowed an expansion of the area to about 1000 acres. Subsequently, the Thai government decided to expand the area with an additional 800 acres to support education and research about the environment and wildlife. It remains ranked as the second largest zoo in Asia in 2025.

The zoo is famous for offering visitors the chance to see the animals up close, whether by renting a golf cart, driving a car or walking through the exhibits.

In 2021, the zoo came under scrutiny for its elephant swimming exhibit when an Australian photojournalist, Adam Oswell, won the Wildlife Photographer of the Year award for Photojournalism with a photo taken at Khao Kheow. Called "Elephant in the Room," the photo shows an elephant submerged in a tank with a trainer while people watch through an underwater window. The photo's caption says, "Adam uses his photo to draw attention to the crowd watching, rather than the elephant itself, bringing into question these forms of tourist entertainment. Around the world, animals are held captive and deprived of their natural way of life to serve as entertainment in zoos and touring shows." Dr. Visit Arsaithamkul, a veterinarian who worked at Khao Kheow at the time, told CNN that the elephants are trained through "reward-based positive reinforcement" and that "they voluntarily get into the pool.”

The zoo will host the mountain biking event during 2025 SEA Games.

== Zones ==
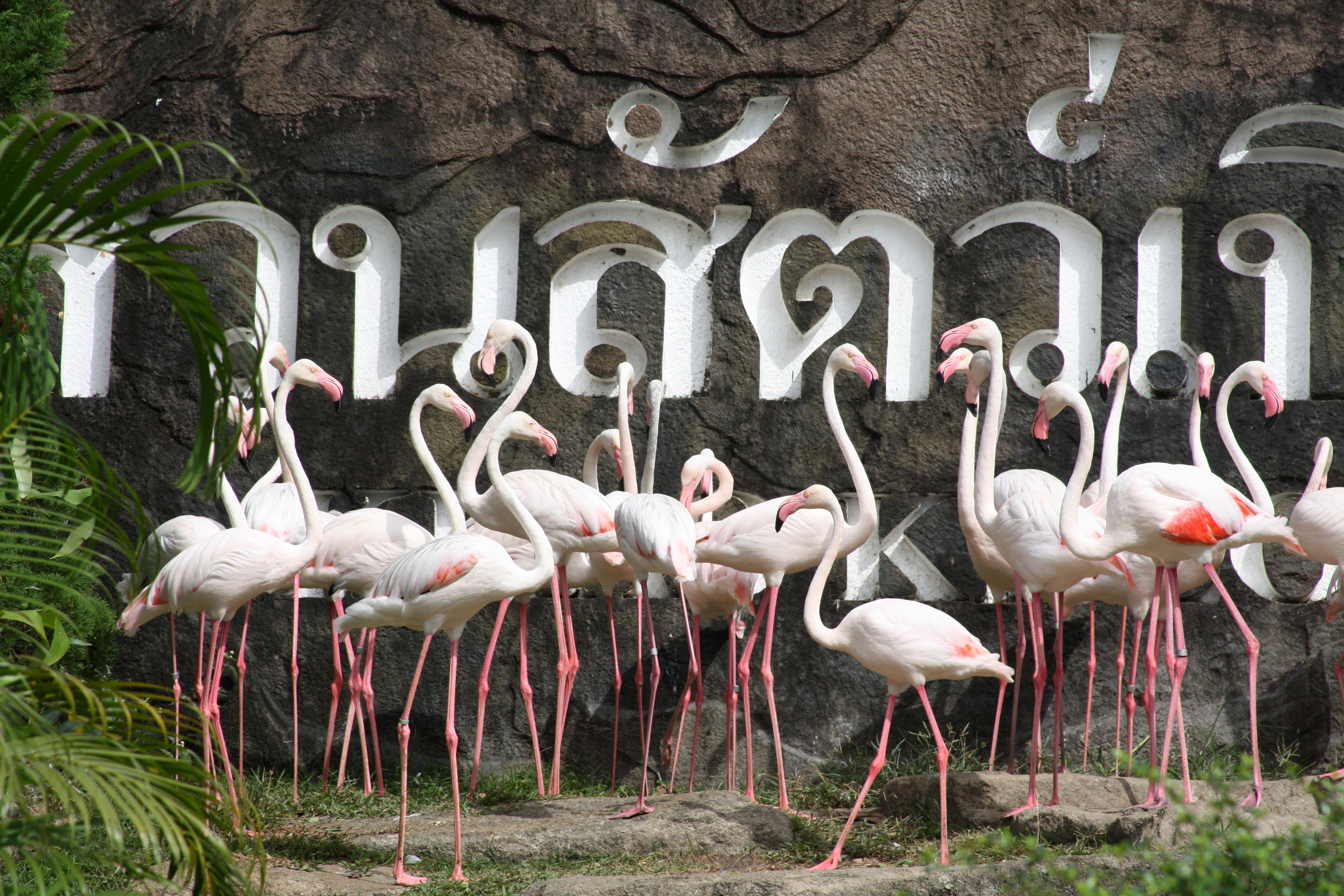
Flamingos at Khao Kheow Open Zoo

The zoo is divided into several thematic zones.

- African Savannah – This section is designed to resemble the habitat of African wildlife. Animals housed in this include Grant's zebras, impalas, springbok, East African oryxes, giraffes, white rhinoceroses, and South African ostriches. This zone is two acres in size and visitors can feed many of the animals.
- Khao Kheow Night Safari – This zone is for visitors who want to explore and experience the zoo after sunset. After dark, visitors can hear the night time sounds of animals and get the atmosphere of a wild night.
- Cats Complex Park – This park consists of a collection of animals in the cat family. Visitors can observe 48 species of varying size in eight enclosures that cover a total area of 40 acres. Each enclosure area is inspired by different habitats, for example, grasslands, desert, lands, woodlands, wetlands, and mountains.
- Walk Through Aviary – Visitors can walk through the aviary while being surrounded by more than 80 different bird species. The aviary covers two acres and is decorated with streams, ponds, waterfalls, and many plants.
- Eld's Deer Park – The deer park is more than an acre in size.

== Notable animals ==
=== Moo Deng ===
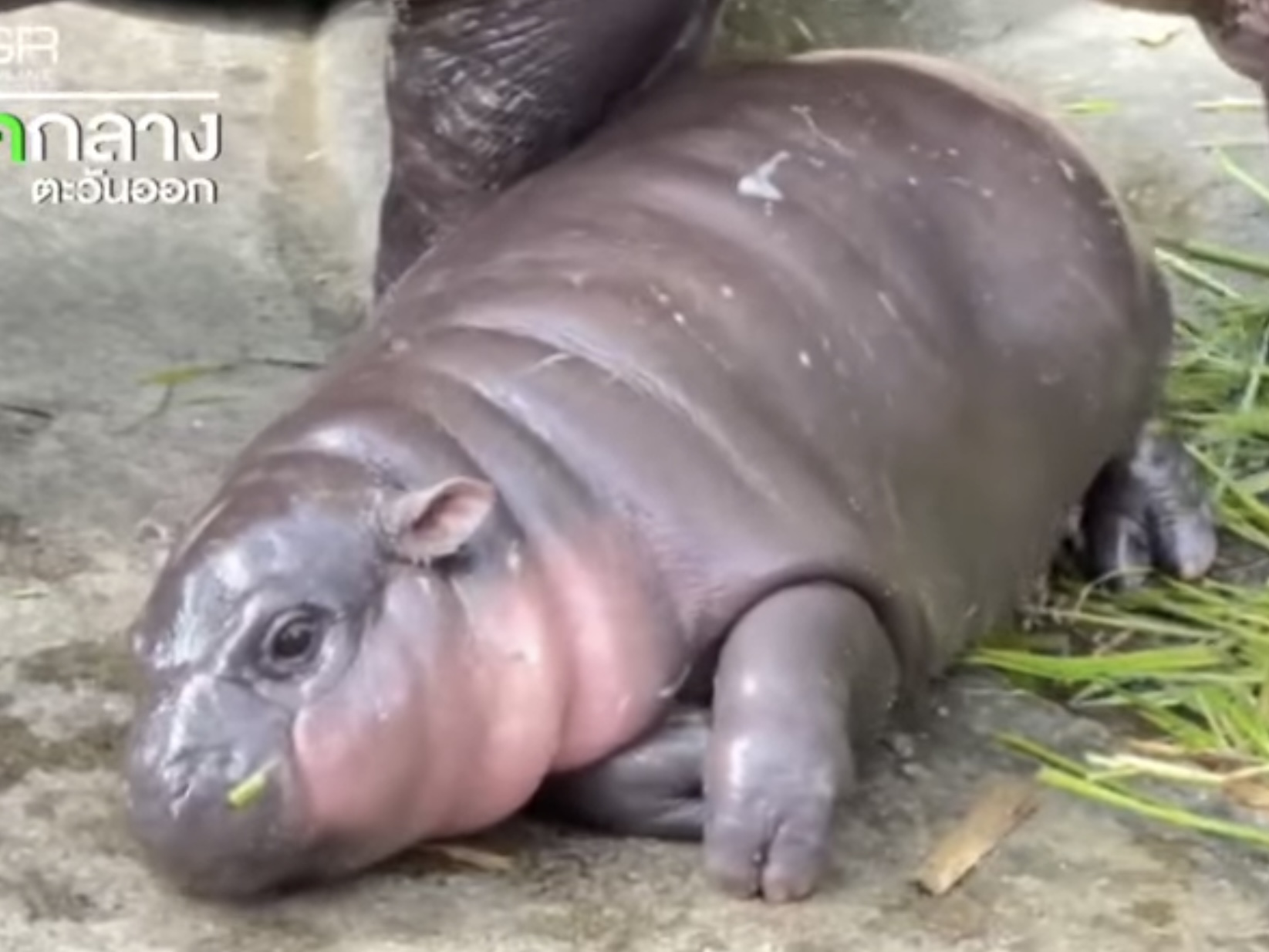
Moo deng, a pygmy hippo in Khao Khoew Zoo

In 2024, a baby pygmy hippopotamus named Moo Deng was born at the zoo. She quickly became an internet phenomenon, boosted the number of visitors to the zoo, and caused the zoo's director to secure copyright and trademark rights for the hippo. Animal rights groups expressed concern for Moo Deng. A spokesperson for People for the Ethical Treatment of Animals (PETA) said, "She faces a lifetime of confinement," while World Animal Protection said, "Sharing Moo Deng content might seem innocuous, but it promotes cruelty to animals.” The zoo's director, Narongwit Chodchoi, rejected the allegations and maintained that the facility ensures the welfare and quality of life for more than 2,000 animals. The Thai Society for the Prevention of Cruelty to Animals, an animal welfare organisation, said that Moo Deng was well taken care of and that PETA was relying on "outdated" information. The pygmy hippopotamus is an endangered species from West Africa, with fewer than 2,000-2,500 adults left, according to the International Union for Conservation of Nature.

=== Gallery of animals ===
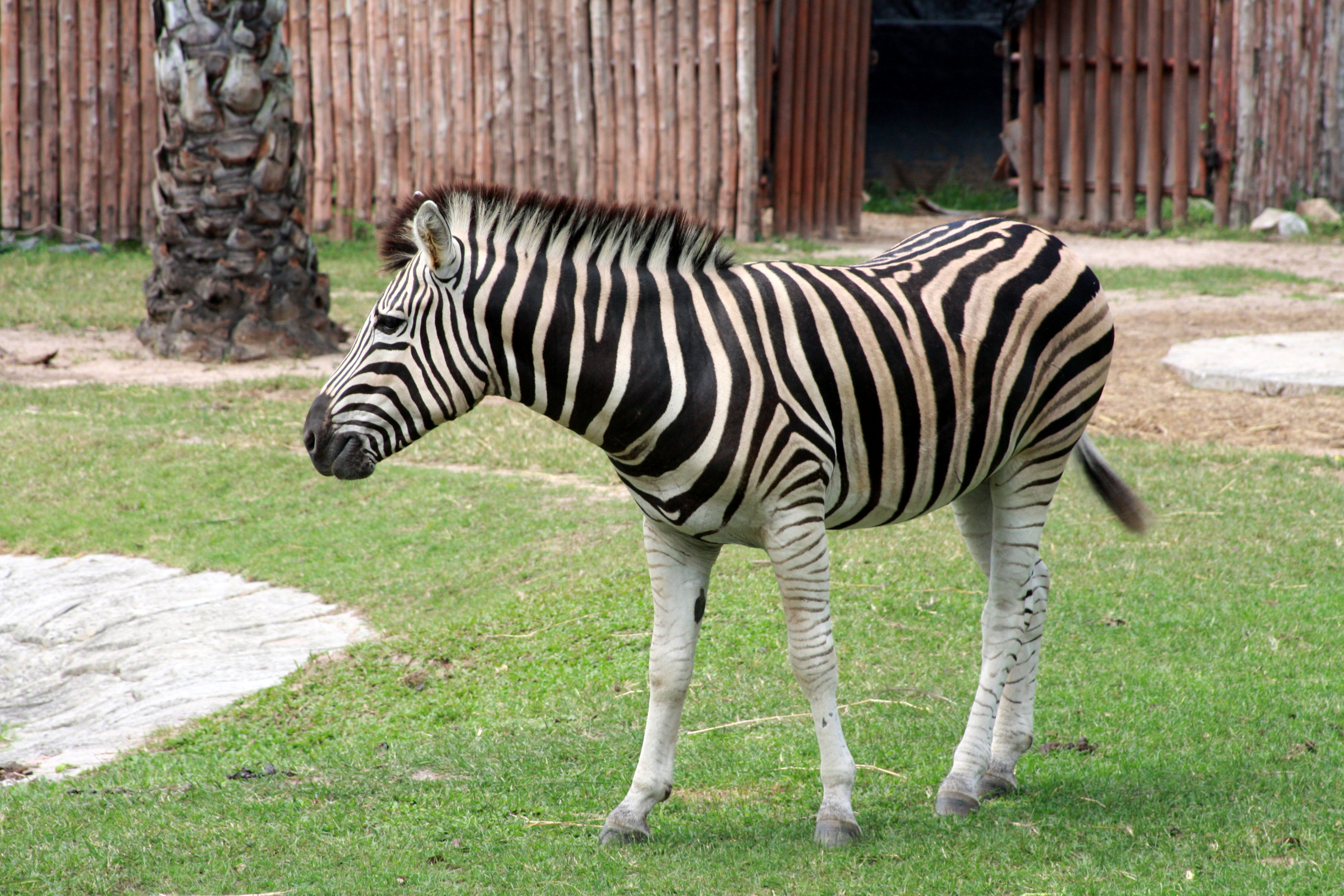
Zebra

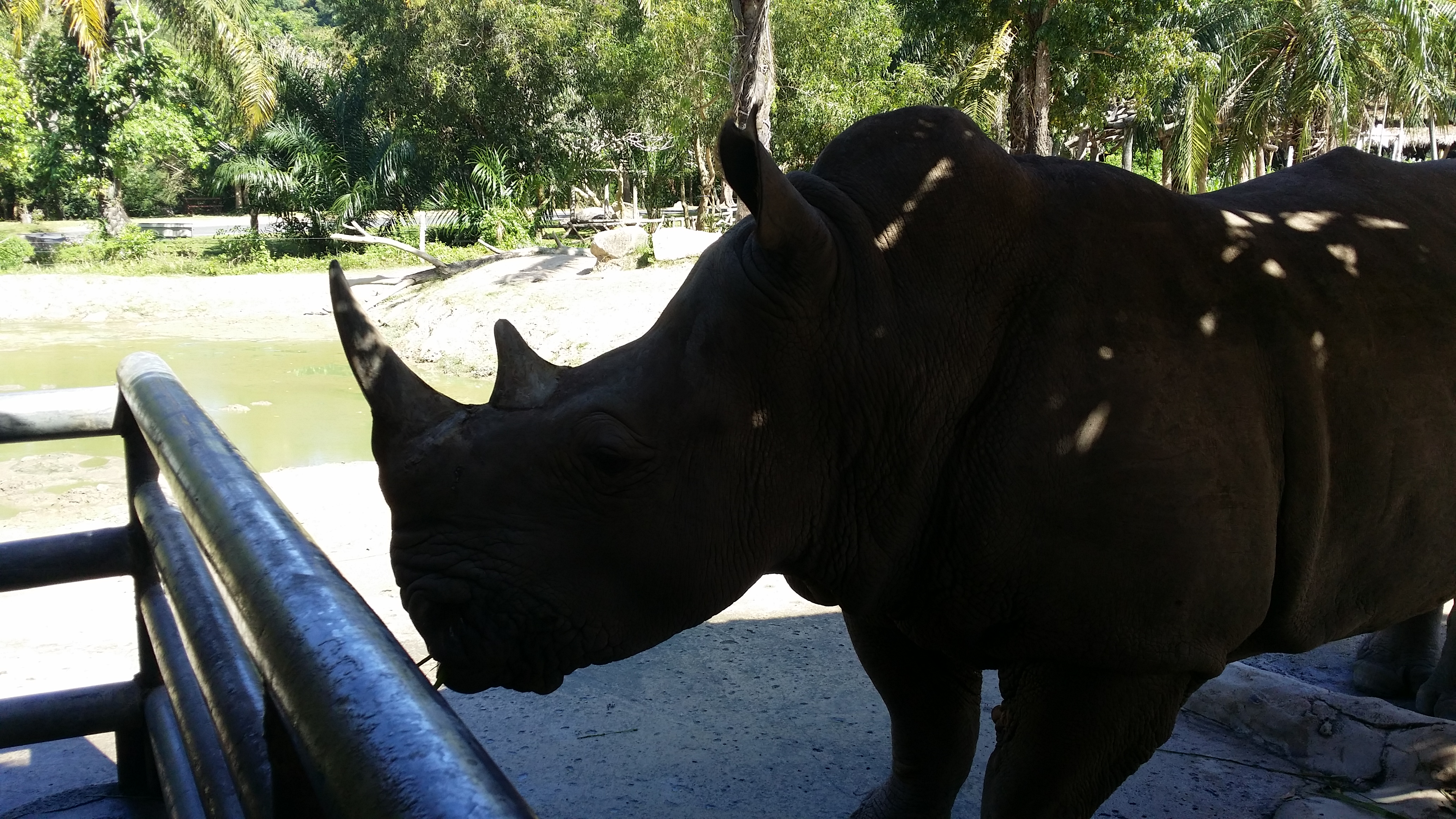
Southern white rhinoceros

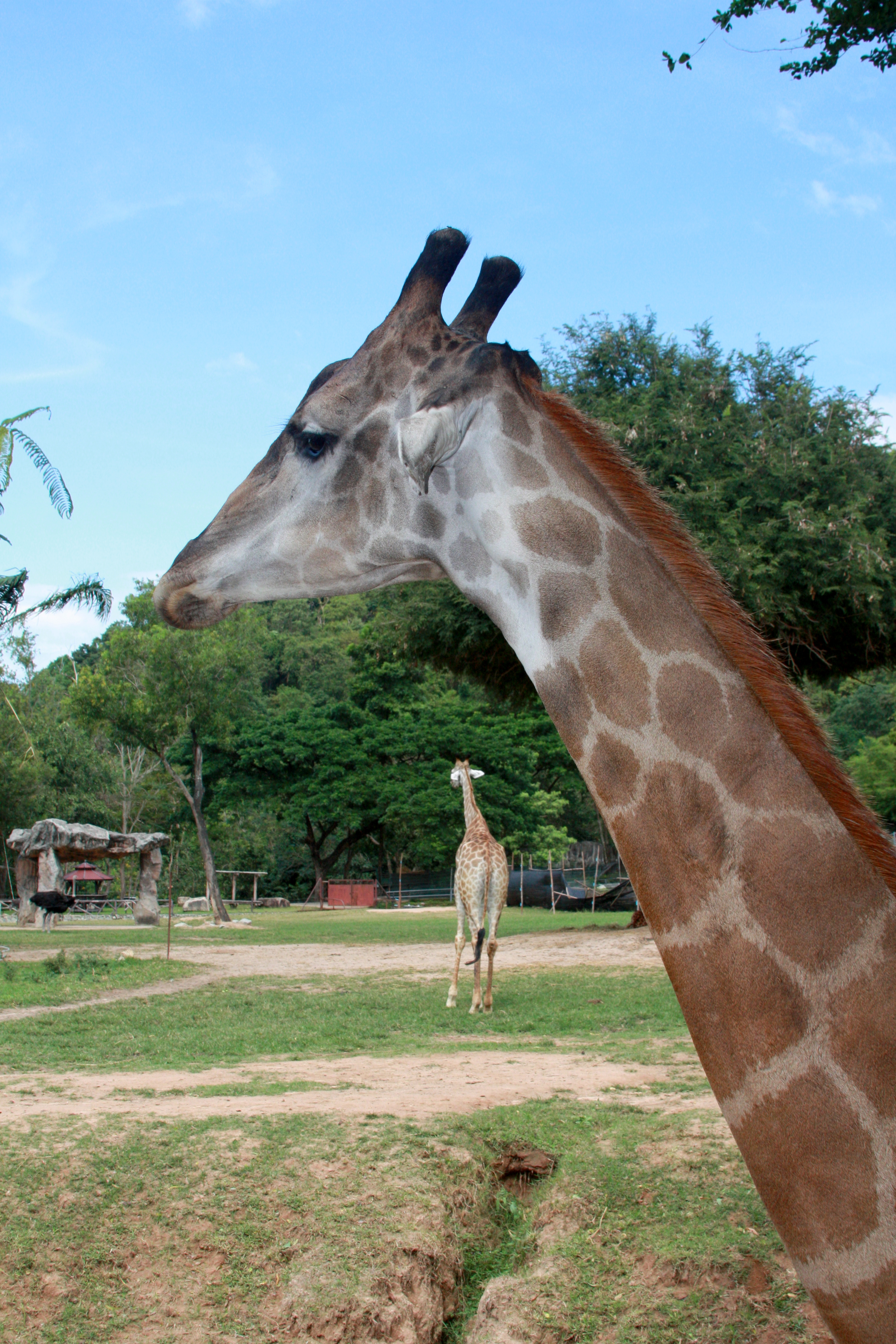
Giraffe

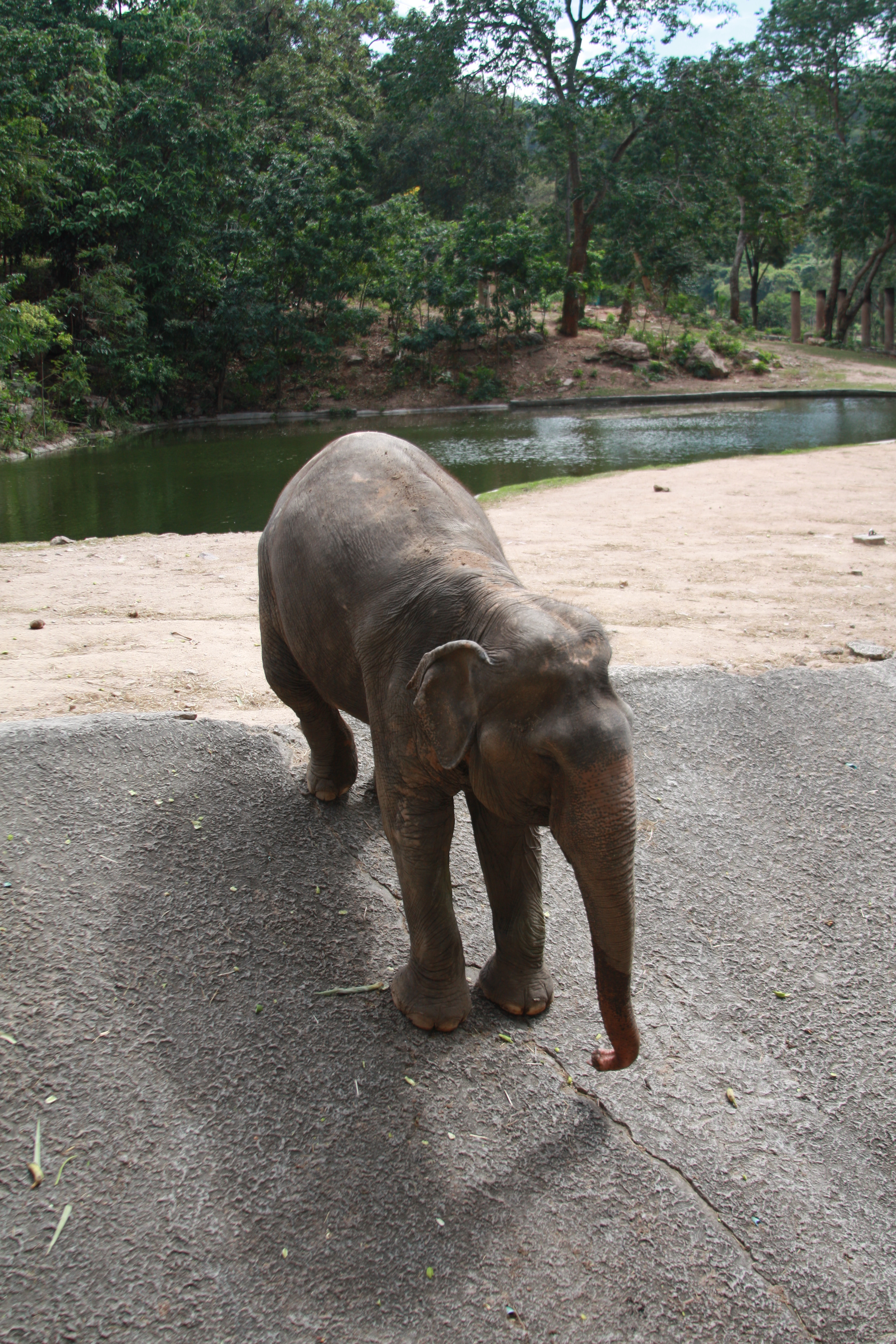
Asian elephant

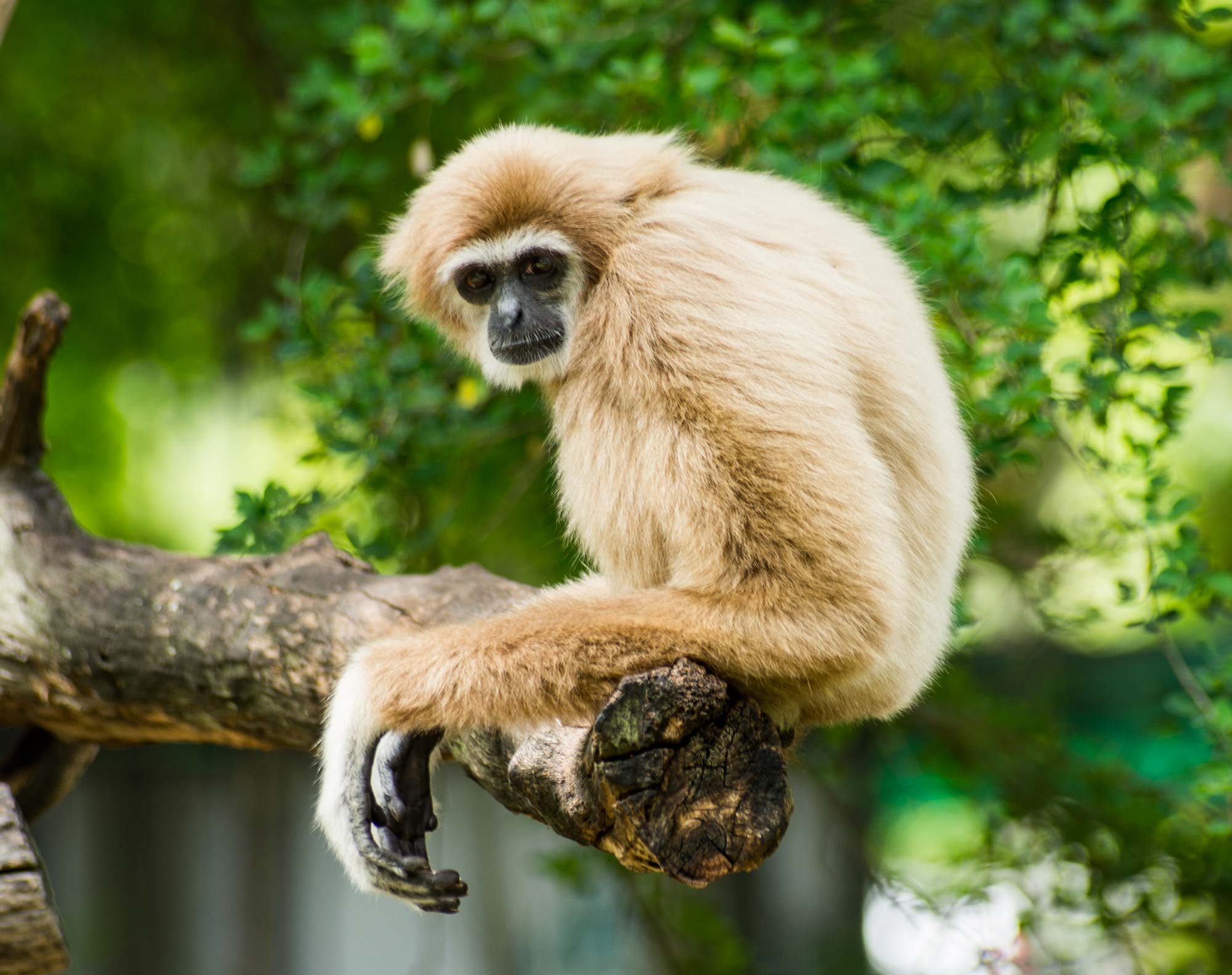
Female pileated gibbon

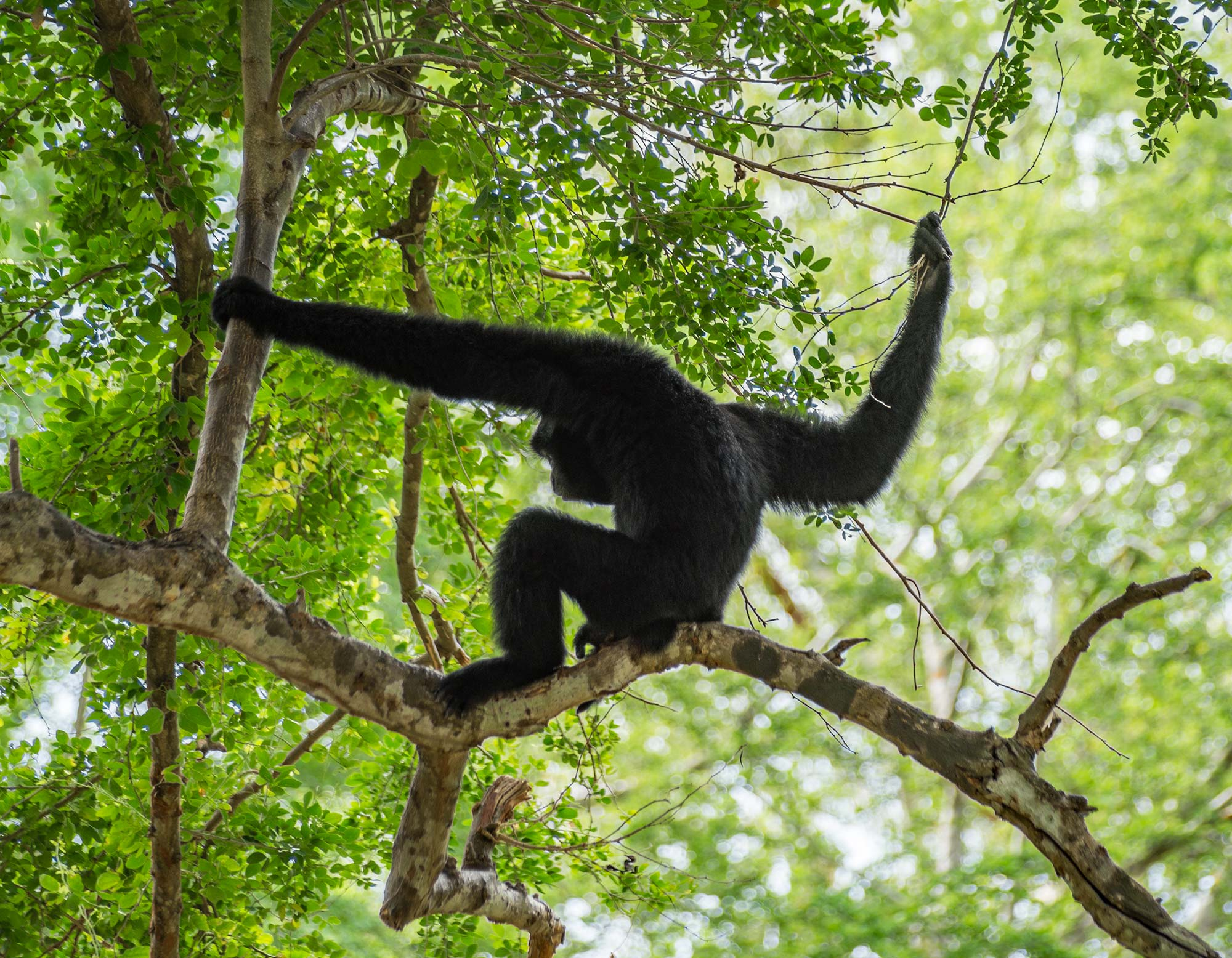
Male pileated gibbon

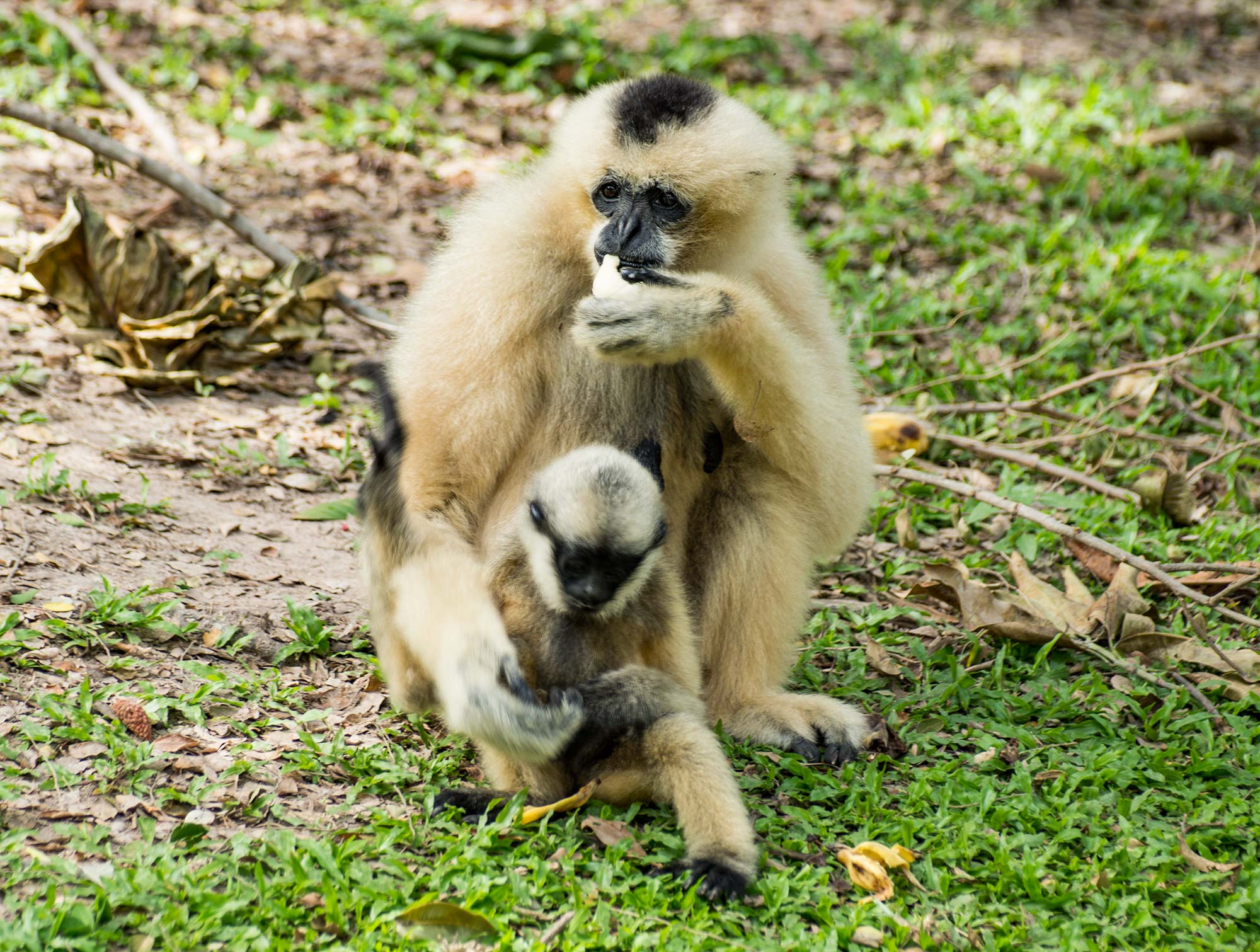
Northern white-cheeked gibbon, female and her baby

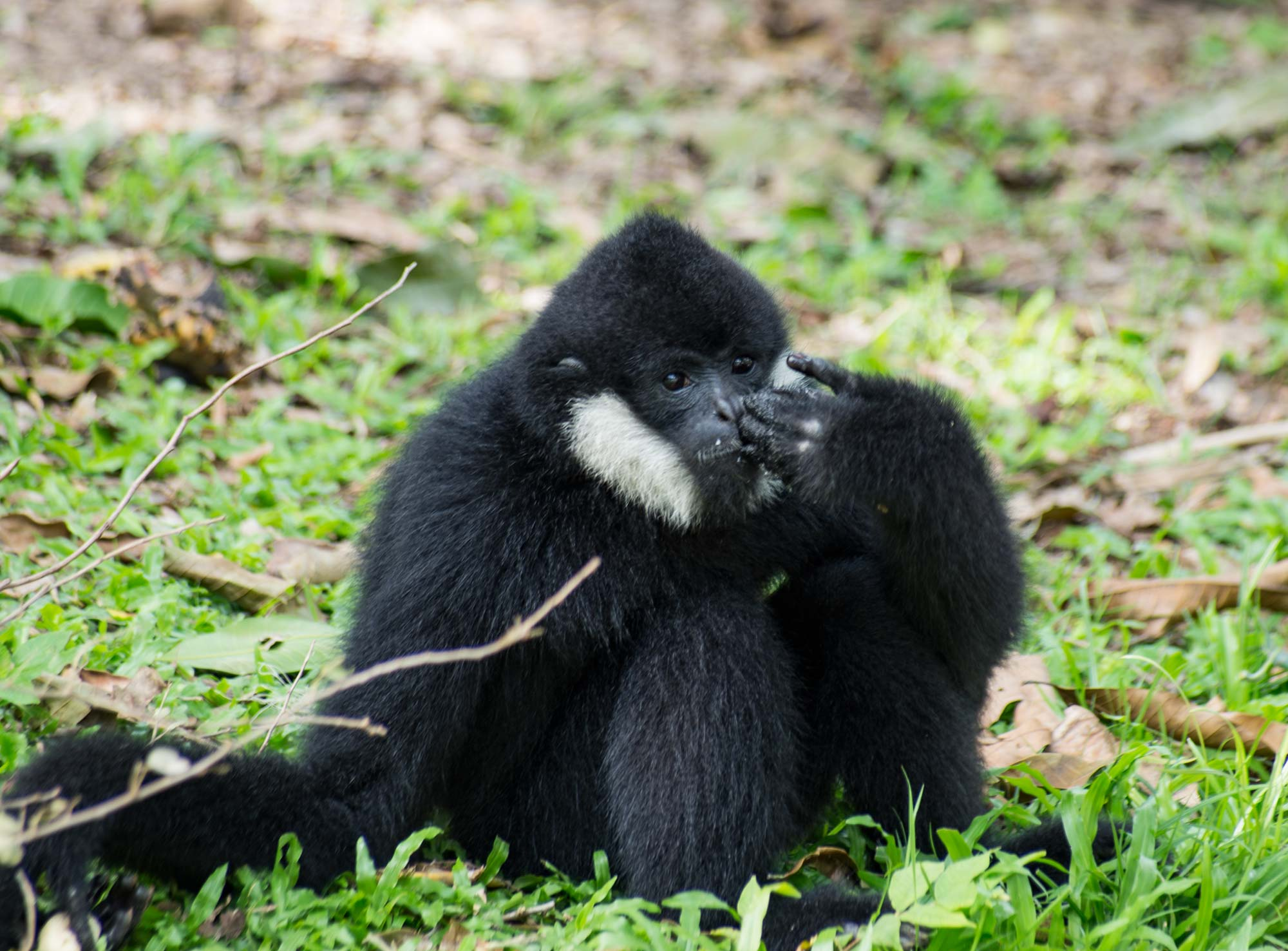
Northern white-cheeked gibbon, male

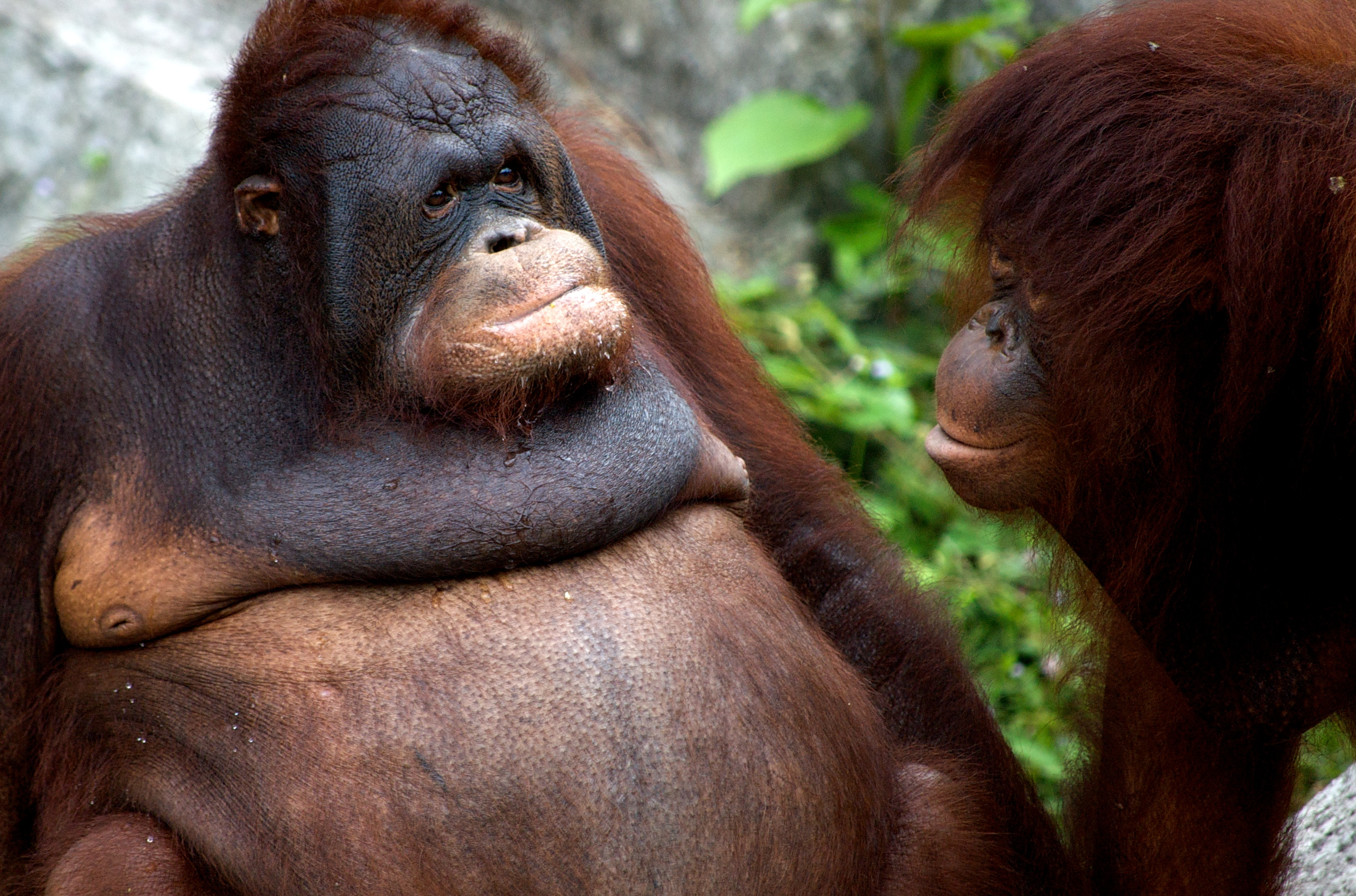
Two orangutans

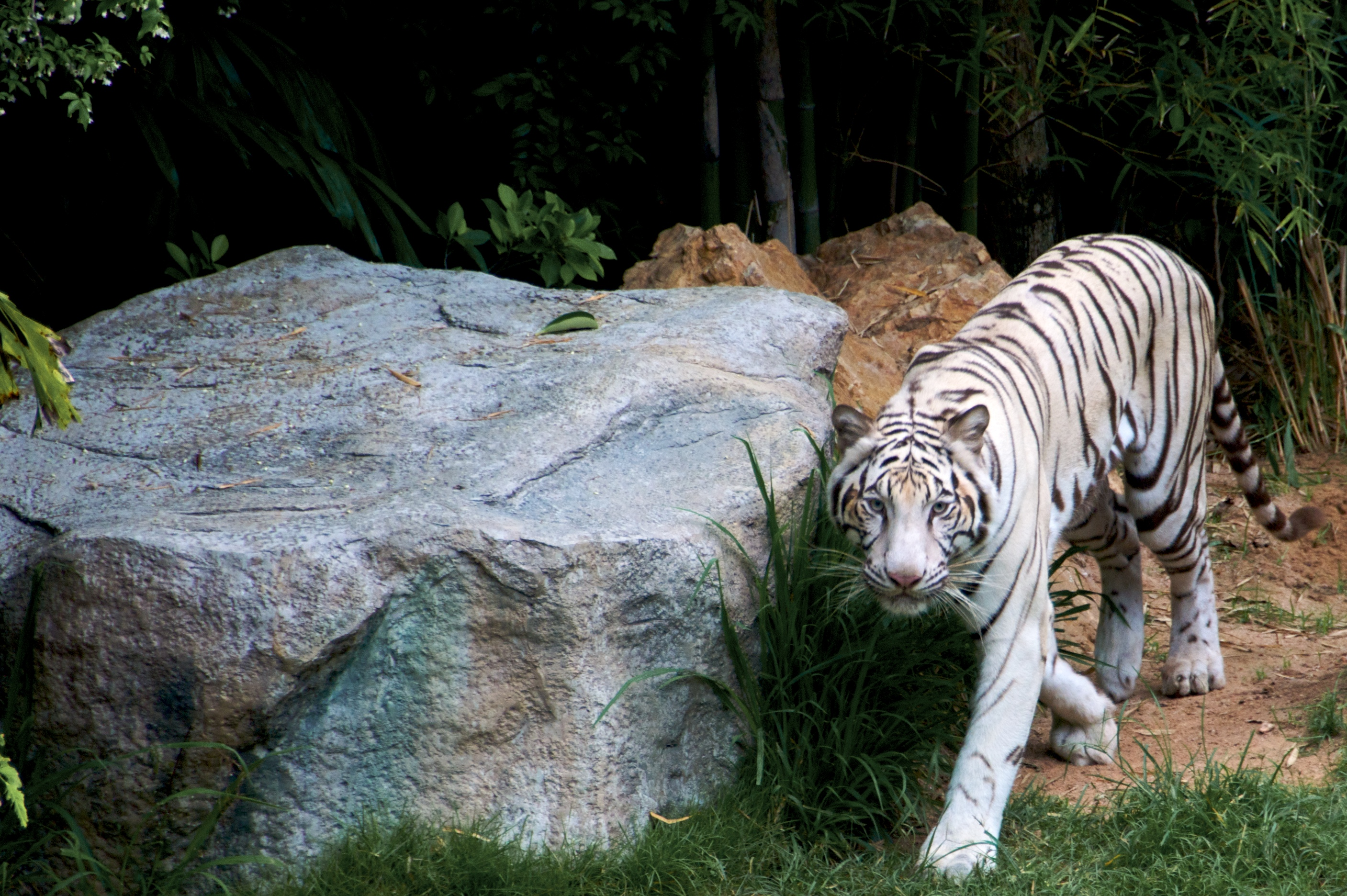
White tiger

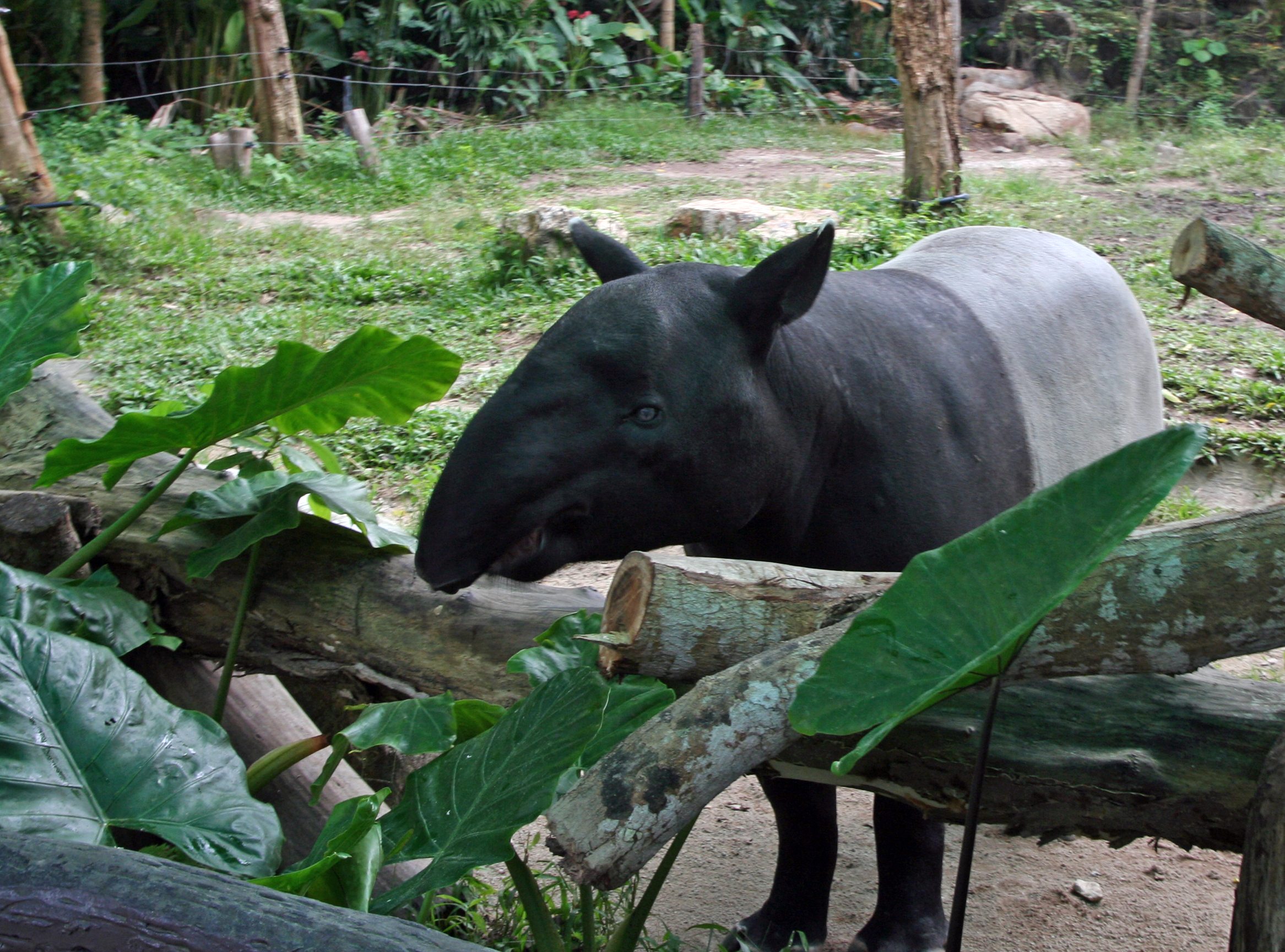
Malayan tapir
