= Hippopotamus (disambiguation) =

A hippopotamus is a large, mostly herbivorous African mammal.

Hippopotamus may also refer to:

- Hippopotamus (album), a 2017 album by Sparks
- Hippopotamus (genus)
- Hippopotamus (hieroglyph), an Egyptian hieroglyph
- Hippopotamus (restaurant), a French chain of grill restaurants
- The Hippopotamus, a 1994 novel by Stephen Fry
  - The Hippopotamus (film), a 2017 film adaptation of the novel
- Hippopotamus Defence, an opening strategy in chess

== See also ==
- Hippo (disambiguation)
- Cyprus dwarf hippopotamus, an extinct species
- Hippopotamus antiquus or "European hippopotamus", an extinct species
- Hippopotamus creutzburgi, an extinct species
- Hippopotamus gorgops, an extinct species
- Hippopotamus melitensis or "Maltese hippopotamus", an extinct species
- Hippopotamus pentlandi or "Sicilian hippopotamus", an extinct species
- Malagasy hippopotamus, several extinct species
- Pygmy hippopotamus, a related species
- William the Hippopotamus, an Egyptian faience hippopotamus statuette from the Middle Kingdom
