= Għar Dalam =

Cave and archaeological site in Malta

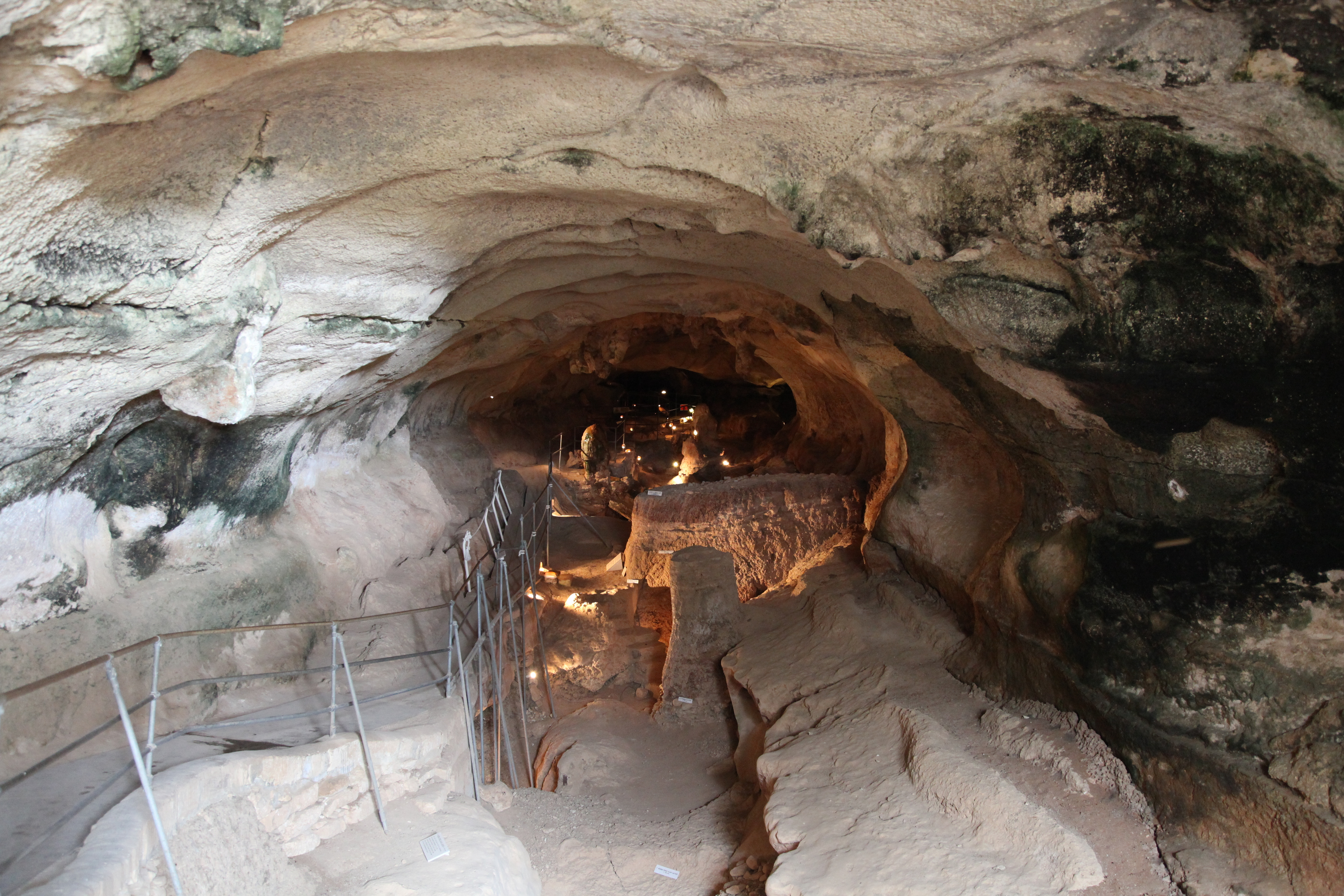
- Entrance to the cave of Għar Dalam

- Location within Malta
- 35°50′11.1″N 14°31′40.9″E
- Type: Cave
- Periods: Għar Dalam phase
- Location: Birżebbuġa, Malta

History
- Built: c. 5200 BC

Site notes
- Material: Limestone
- Length: 144 m (472 ft)
- Owner: Government of Malta
- Management: Heritage Malta
- Public access: Yes
- Website: heritagemalta.org/museums-sites/ghar-dalam/

Għar Dalam (Maltese pronunciation: [ɐˤːr ˈdɐlɐm]; "Cave of Dalam", Dalam being a fifteenth-century family name)^{[A]} is a 144-metre long phreatic tube and cave, located in the outskirts of Birżebbuġa, Malta. The cave contains the bones of animals that lived on Malta during the Pleistocene and Holocene epochs. It has lent its name to the early Neolithic-aged Għar Dalam phase in Maltese prehistory, and is viewed as one of Malta's most important national monuments. Pottery similar to that found in Stentinello was found at Għar Dalam, but lacking details such as stamp decorations.

Dwarf elephant, hippopotamus, giant swan, deer and bear bone deposits found there are of different ages. The deer species became extinct much later, about 4,000 years ago during the Chalcolithic. Until 2025, Għar Dalam was thought to have the earliest evidence of human settlement on Malta, some 7,400 years ago.

== Recent history ==
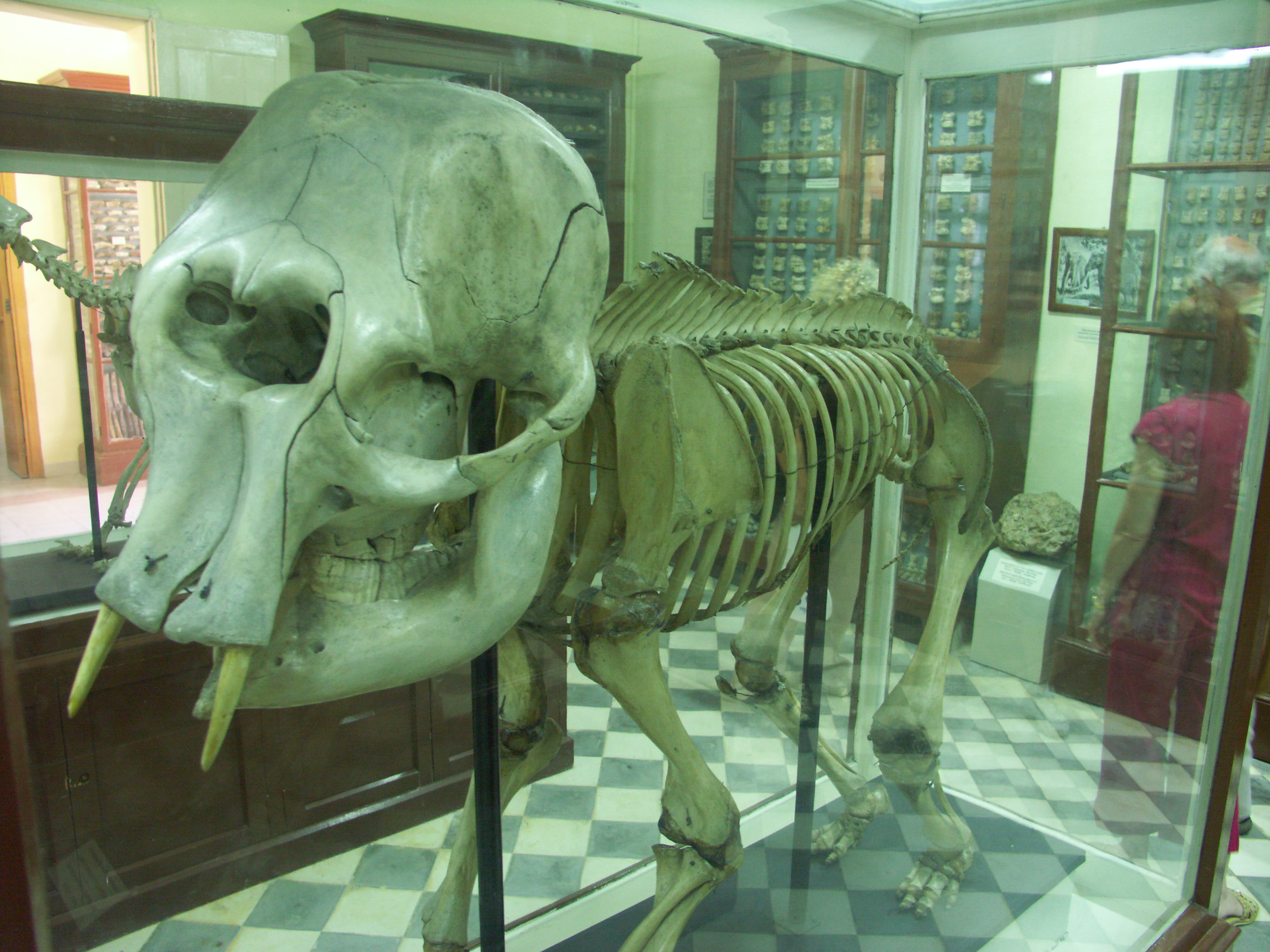
Modern juvenile African elephant skeleton at the museum (not a dwarf elephant as sometimes claimed)

The cave was first investigated for its Neolithic remains in 1865, with excavations by Italian palaeontologist Arturo Issel. An excavation was carried out in 1892 by John H. Cooke. The bulk of this material was stored in Malta, while a comparative collection was sent to the British Museum. This material was studied by Forsyth Major in 1902, who isolated a new dwarf species of dwarf hippopotamus, Hippopotamus melitensis, based on these findings.

The cave was included on the Antiquities List of 1925, but was not opened to the public until March 1933. A museum was set up on site by the then-Curator of Natural History, Joseph Baldacchino. Within a year of his appointment as curator in 1935, Baldacchino published a booklet on Għar Dalam, highlighting the main excavations and investigations of the cave. The museum was slowly upgraded, new specimens replacing the old, and a labelling system set in place.

The showcases around the walls of the Għar Dalam museum house the skeletal remains found in the cave. These are organised by species and type. The showcases in the centre of the museum's room contain complete skeletons of modern examples of deer, elephant and other species. These were not found in the cave, but imported as reference specimens for the use of scholars working on the fossil examples.

It was used as an air-raid shelter during World War II. In 1980, the most important and irreplaceable relics—such as four tusks of dwarf elephants and the skull of a Neolithic child—were stolen from the museum.

The cave is some 144 metres (472 ft) deep but only the first 50 metres (160 ft) are accessible to visitors. The museum, which still exhibits a remarkable wealth of finds from animal bones to human artifacts, is the entrance to the whole area.

Għar Dalam Cave and Museum is operated by Heritage Malta. In 2019, a project was announced to improve the physical accessibility between Għar Dalam, Ta’ Kaċċatura, Borġ in-Nadur, and other sites which are in close proximity to one another.

== Stratigraphy ==
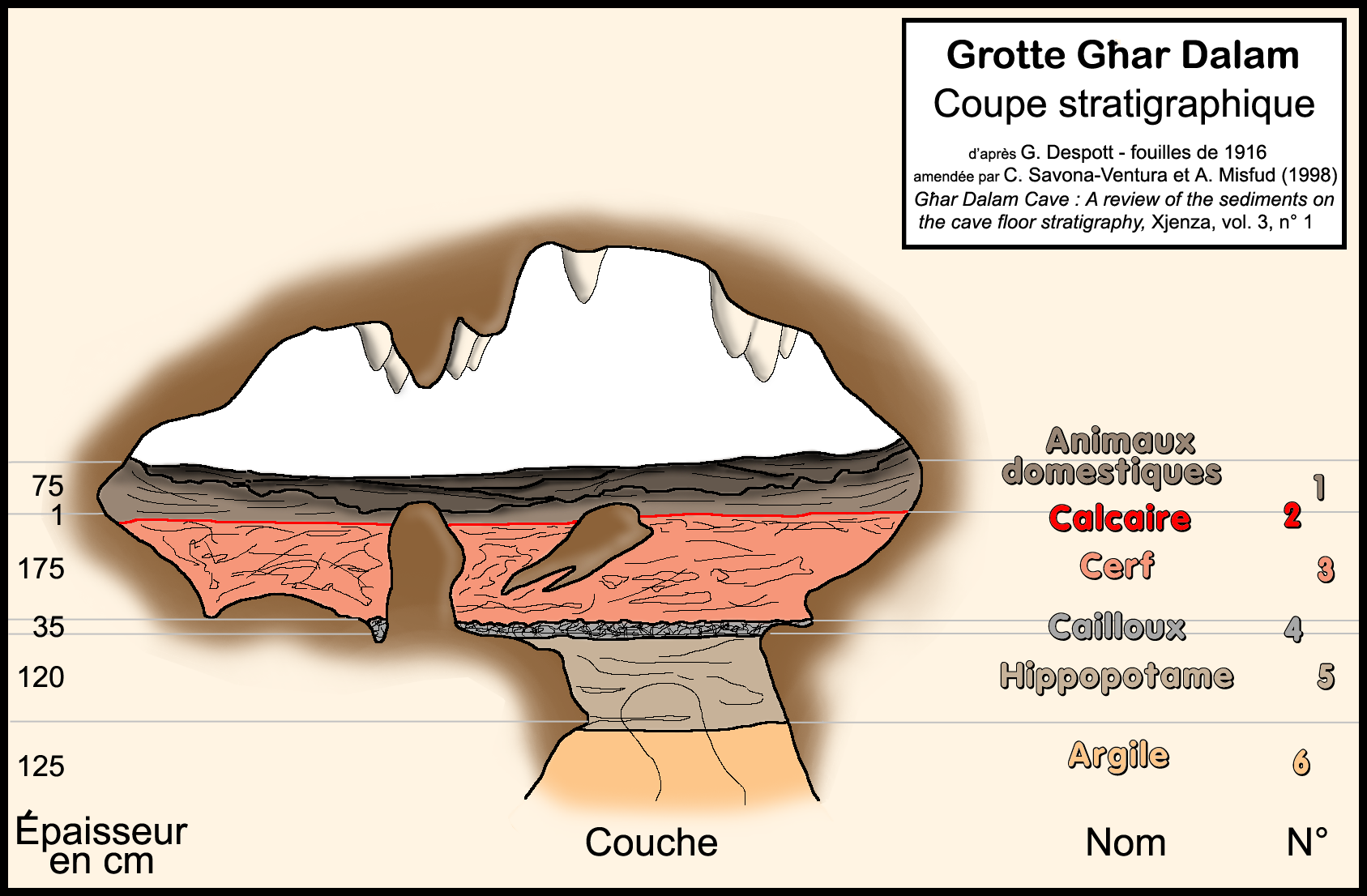
Stratigraphy of Għar Dalam

The cave consists of a number of sequential layers, which have been dated using radiometric techniques.

Layer number	Layer names	Age	Description	Faunal remains	Notes
II	Upper domestic animals/pottery layer cave earth layer	Holocene (2,700 years ago-recent)	"dark red clay"	Domestic animals (cow, sheep, goat, pig, cat), equine (Equus sp.), possible deer (?Cervus sp) black rat, house mouse, rabbit (Oryctolagus cuniculus) shrew (Crocidura russula), wood mouse (Apodemus sylvaticus), tortoise (Testudo sp.) lizard (Chalcides ocellatus) frogs and toads (Discoglossus pictus, Bufo viridis)	Also contains pottery, and other human artifacts, as well as human remains
III	Lower domestic animals/pottery layer small stones/pebbles layer	Holocene (around 7,200 - 2,700 years ago)	"dark grey earth, sub-angular stones and pebbles"	Domestic animals (cow, sheep, goat, pig, cat), equine (Equus sp.), possible deer (?Cervus sp) black rat, house mouse, rabbit (Oryctolagus cuniculus) shrew (Crocidura russula), wood mouse (Apodemus sylvaticus), tortoise (Testudo sp.) lizard (Chalcides ocellatus) frogs and toads (Discoglossus pictus, Bufo viridis)	Also contains pottery, and other human artifacts, as well as human remains
IV	Upper Red Earth (Cervus stage)	Late Pleistocene (after 116,300/103,800 years ago for onset of deposition, before 80,100 years ago for onset of deposition of sublayer IVc, and between 80,100 and 23-20,000 years ago for deposition of sublayer IVb) (Note: Layer IVa was deposited after 20,000 years ago and is more similar in faunal composition to the overlying layers III and II than to other red earth layers)	"deep vegetable soil with alternating brown-red and white layers. 5+ divisions by stalagmitic plates/torba floors"	Deer (likely 3 endemic species of Cervus) bovine (Bos sp.) equine (Equus sp.) vole (Pitymys melitensis) shrew (Crocidura sp.), bats, turtle (Emys orbicularis), toad (Bufo bufo), birds	Remains much less mineralised and worn than those of the breccia/Hippopotamus layer.
V	Lower Red Earth (Carnivora Stage)	late Middle Pleistocene (167,300 to 151,200 years ago)	"deep vegetable soil with alternating brown-red and white layers. 5+ divisions by stalagmitic plates/torba floors"	Dwarf elephant (Palaeoloxodon mnaidriensis and/or Palaeoloxodon sp) Hippopotamus (Hippopotamus pentlandi) deer (Cervus cf. elaphus and Cervus cf. barbarus) red fox (Vulpes vulpes), wolf (Canis lupus), brown bear (Ursus cf. arctos), vole (Pitymys melitensis), shrew (Crocidura sp.) bats, turtle (Emys orbicularis), toad (Bufo bufo), birds	Remains much less mineralised and worn than those of the breccia/Hippopotamus layer.
VI	Pebble layer	Middle Pleistocene (prior to 165,900 years ago)	"rolled pebbles in red clay"	None	
VII	Bone breccia layer Hippopotamus layer	Middle Pleistocene (prior to 165,900 years ago)	"light green to brown clay, consolidated to breccia in outer regions"	Hippopotamus (Hippopotamus pentlandi, Hippopotamus melitensis) Dwarf elephant (Palaeoloxodon mnaidriensis and/orPalaeoloxodon sp), deer (Cervus cf. elaphus) possible equine (Equus sp?) shrew (cf. Crocidura russula) dormice (Maltamys/Eliomys) bats, birds including Cygnus falconeri	Bones strongly mineralised and dark in colour and heavily water worn/rolled, so that they resemble pebbles.
VIII	Detritral Clay layer Sterile layer	Early-Middle Pleistocene (prior to 167,000 years ago)	"plastic laminated clay, yellowish blue colour"	None	

== Notes ==
[A]. Buhagiar (2007) notes that the name Għar Dalam does not mean the 'Cave of Darkness', as would be the case in Arabic, but the 'Cave of Dalam,' or 'of the Dalam family.' The surname Dalam is attested in 15th century records.
