= Hipo =

The term Hipo may refer to:

- Hippopotamus
- Hilfspolizei, an auxiliary police force
- HIPO model, a 1970s tool for planning and documenting a computer program
- 289 HiPo, a Ford Windsor engine
- HIPO Corps, a Danish auxiliary police corps established by the German gestapo
- Hip-O Records, part of Universal Music Group

== See also ==
- Hippo (disambiguation)
- Hypo (disambiguation)
