= Hippo (disambiguation) =

A hippo or hippopotamus is either of two species of large African mammal which live mainly in and near water:

- Hippopotamus
- Pygmy hippopotamus

Hippo or Hippos may also refer to:

== Toponymy ==
- The ancient city of Hippo Regius (modern Annaba, Algeria)
- The ancient city of Hippo Diarrhytus (modern Bizerte, Tunisia)
- Hippo, Kentucky
- Hippos (Golan Heights), an archaeological site in the Israel–Syria DMZ

== Given names ==
- Hippo (Greek woman), a Greek woman mentioned by Valerius Maximus as an example of chastity
- Hippo (philosopher), a Presocratic Greek philosopher
- Hippo Galloway (1882–1943), American-Canadian professional baseball player
- Hippo, one of the mythical Oceanids
- Hippo, one of the daughters of the mythical Thespius
- Hippo, one of the mythical Amazons
- Hippo, one of the Leuctrides
- Hippo, a powerful gangster character in the 2015 Neill Blomkamp film Chappie

== Brand and product names ==
- Hippo CMS, an open-source content management system
- Hippo (company), an American property insurance company based in Palo Alto, California
- Hippo (snack), a popular Indian snack

== Other ==
- Hippo APC, a South African armoured personnel carrier
- Hippo (Hpo), a protein kinase involved in the Hippo signaling pathway
- Hippo Family Club, a multilingual club originated from Japan
- Hippo (film), a 2023 film by Mark H. Rapaport
- "Hippo" (The Brak Show), a 2001 episode
- The Hippos, an American band
- The Hippos (Australian band)
- HIPPO, highest paid person's opinion. It is often a deciding factor in what decisions and next steps a team takes

== See also ==
- Augustine of Hippo
- Hipo (disambiguation)
- Hippopotamus (disambiguation)
- Hungry Hungry Hippos, a children's game marketed by Milton Bradley
- King Hippo, a fictional boxer from Nintendo's Punch-Out!! series
- Tree warbler, genus Hippolais
