= Joseph Baldacchino =

Maltese archaeologist (1894–1974)

Joseph G. Baldacchino (17 July 1894 – 6 July 1974) was a Maltese archaeologist. He was born in Siġġiewi and spent his early childhood in that locality until 1901, when his family moved to Tarxien. In 1909, the family moved to Qormi, where he studied medicine, graduating as a medical doctor in 1919.

Although he worked as a general practitioner for over a decade, by 1930 he was showing a deep interest in paleontology. He was appointed curator of natural history within the Malta Museum Department in 1933. He continued work on the Għar Dalam Museum and excavated the cave at this site. His hypothesis formulated at this time, that the cave was originally divided by an ancient river is still considered as valid today.

After the war he was appointed director of the Museum Department in 1947. Under his directorship the department toiled to bring out material stored during the war years and display it once again. A number of restoration and excavation campaigns were conducted at Ħaġar Qim, Mnajdra and Tarxien Temples while material uncovered following serendipitous discoveries was published.

Baldacchino retired from the Museum Department in 1955 and for a number of years worked at the University of Malta. He died on 6 July 1974 and was buried at the Addolorata Cemetery in Paola, Malta, just eleven days short of his 80th. birthday.

== Bibliography ==
- C. SAGONA, THE ARCHAEOLOGY OF PUNIC MALTA (Ancient Near Eastern Studies Supplement 9; Peeters, Leuven, 2002). Pp. xiv + 1165, 349 figs, 13 maps, 4 tables. ISBN 90-429-0917-X. Eur. 160. -
- C. SAGONA, PUNIC ANTIQUITIES OF MALTA AND OTHER ANCIENT ARTEFACTS HELD IN ECCLESIASTIC AND PRIVATE COLLECTIONS (Ancient Near Eastern Studies Supplement 10; Peeters, Leuven, 2003) Pp. 374, 101 figs, 1 map. ISBN 90-429-1353-3. Eur. 105.
