= Guatemalan vole =

Conservation status
- Near Threatened (IUCN 3.1)

Scientific classification
- Kingdom: Animalia
- Phylum: Chordata
- Class: Mammalia
- Order: Rodentia
- Family: Cricetidae
- Subfamily: Arvicolinae
- Genus: Microtus
- Subgenus: Pitymys
- Species: M. guatemalensis

Binomial name
- Microtus guatemalensis Merriam, 1898

Species of rodent

The Guatemalan vole (Microtus guatemalensis) is a species of rodent in the family Cricetidae. It is found in Guatemala and Chiapas, Mexico, in montane pine-oak forest and meadow at elevations between 2600 and 3100 m above sea level. It is terrestrial and probably diurnal or crepuscular.
