= Tarabundí vole =

Conservation status
- Endangered (IUCN 3.1)

Scientific classification
- Kingdom: Animalia
- Phylum: Chordata
- Class: Mammalia
- Infraclass: Placentalia
- Order: Rodentia
- Family: Cricetidae
- Subfamily: Arvicolinae
- Genus: Microtus
- Subgenus: Pitymys
- Species: M. oaxacensis

Binomial name
- Microtus oaxacensis Goodwin, 1966

Species of rodent

The Tarabundí vole (Microtus oaxacensis), a medium-large blackish brown vole, is a species of rodent in the family Cricetidae. It is found only in Mexico, originating from Tuxtepec, Oaxaca, one of the only other vole species from Oaxaca besides Microtus mexicanus. Microtus oaxacensis lives in disturbed vegetation that consist of different grasses and wild strawberries in cloud forest and pine forest, and often can be found living by the highway margins of Tuxtepec, where the cleaning of these vegetations by the highways put the vole at risk, making them vulnerable to extinction. Their habitats provide their diet of strawberry stems and leaves and most importantly, grass.
