= Aetokremnos =

Archaeological site in Cyprus

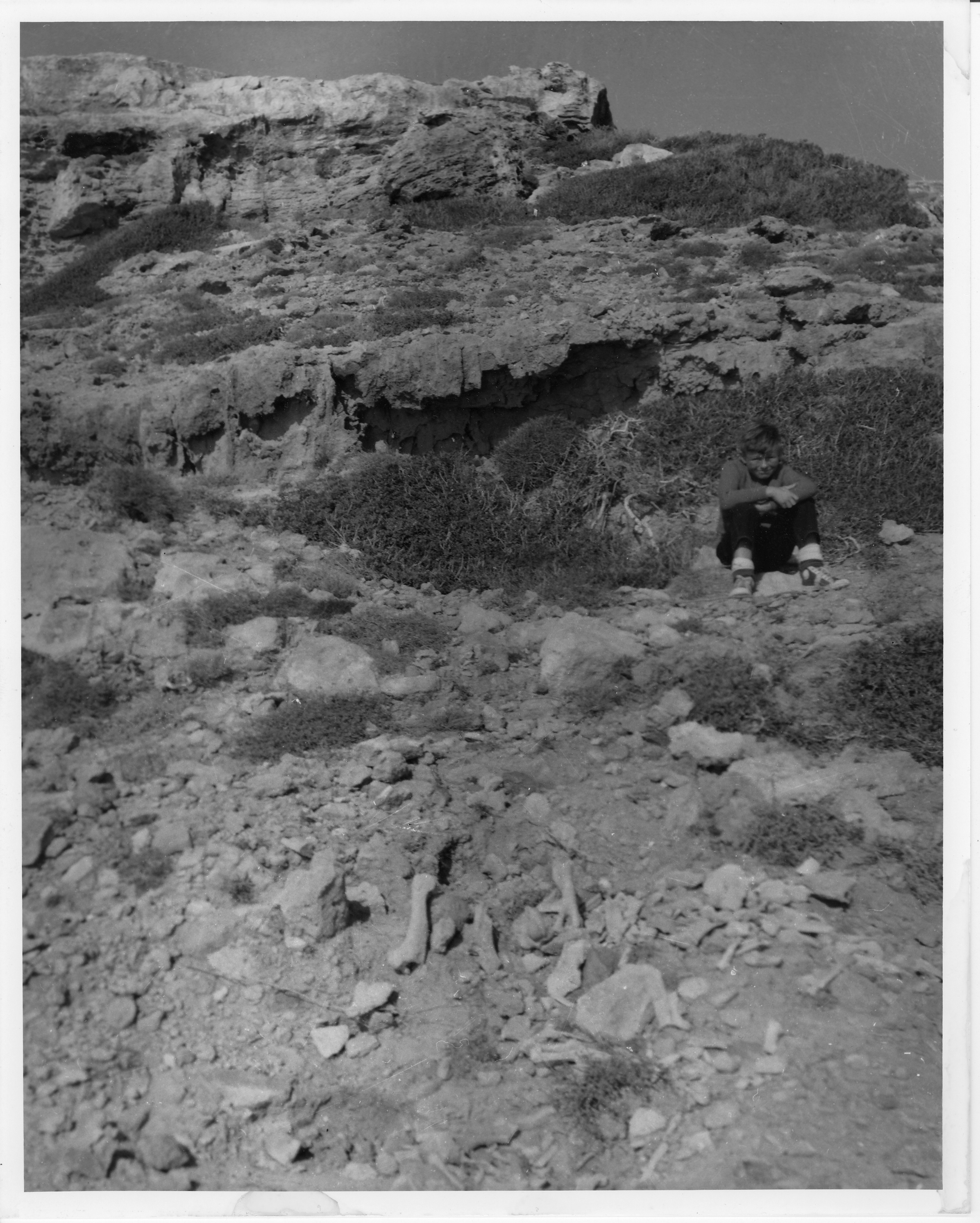
- Aetokremnos upon its discovery, 1960, with fossil remains in the foreground

- Location in Cyprus
- 34°34′14″N 32°59′26″E
- Type: Limestone
- Periods: Mesolithic
- Associated with: Paleo humans
- Location: Near Limassol
- Region: Southern coast of Cyprus

Aetokremnos is a rock shelter near Limassol on the southern coast of Cyprus. It is widely considered to host some of the oldest evidence of human habitation of Cyprus, dating to around 12,000 years ago. It is situated on a steep cliff site around 40 m (130 ft) above the Mediterranean Sea. The name means "Cliff of the eagles" in Greek. Around 40 m^{2} (430 sq ft) have been excavated and out of the four layers documented, the third is sterile.

== Discovery ==
The site, which is located on a British Royal Air Force base, was discovered in 1960 by an anonymous amateur, who reported the find to Stuart Swiny (director of the Cyprus American Archaeological Research Institute in Nicosia). Swiny noted the existence of flint artifacts and a large number of hippo bones and that much of the site had eroded into the Mediterranean. Subsequent study and excavation of the site was conducted by Swiny and other archaeologists.

== Archaeology ==
The site mainly contains bones of the Late Pleistocene endemic Cypriot pygmy hippopotamus, which are represented by the remains of over 370 individuals a much smaller amount of the Cyprus dwarf elephant representing the remains of at least 3 individuals, and artifacts (around 1,000 flints including thumbnail scrapers of the Mesolithic type), which resemble those produced by the Natufian culture of the mainland Levant. There are no bones that show marks of butchery, but an unusually high frequency (30%) of burned bones. Pygmy hippo bones are the most plentiful making up 74% of the bones, followed by fish remains (25%) and birds, mainly bustards. The presence of fallow deer (4 bones) and pig (13 bones) is puzzling, since these animals are only thought to have been introduced in the Neolithic period.

According to the excavators, hearth remains are found in the layer containing the bone beds of the extinct megafauna. This would make it the oldest site on the island and evidence of Epipalaeolithic occupation. The original 31 radiocarbon dates put the date of the bones at c. 12,500 years Before Present (BP). and suggest a short-term occupation. These dates have been challenged as the excavators considered the nine bone dates to be the least reliable and did not agree with the dates of the stratigraphy where they were found. As of 2013 there are now 36 radiocarbon dates of which 13 were taken from animal bones (pig and hippo). A 2013 report states that even discarding these and relying on the other 23 determinations on charcoal, sediment and shells "we reaffirm our original interpretation of a relatively short occupation of some 300 years centered around 11,775 years BP, with a range of 11,652 to 11,955 years BP at one standard deviation, or 11,504 to 12,096 years BP at two standard deviations. This is in general accord with Manning's (2013:501 to 503) masterful compilation of all early Cypriot radiocarbon determinations, in which he places Aetokremnos within an approximate 12,950 to 10,950 years BP range while also preferring a somewhat longer occupation than we presented."

There are other deposits with bones of pygmy elephants and hippopotami on the island, but these do not contain artifacts.

The origin of the bones at the site is disputed. Some authors have suggested that the bones were accumulated at the site by humans, while other authors contend that the age distribution curve of the hippotamus bones suggests that the bones accumulated naturally at the site over hundreds of years, and the burnt bones are the result of later fires lit in the rockshelter by humans following their arrival to Cyprus, by which time the bones were already several centuries old.

== Sources ==
- Simmons, Alan H. (2001). "The first humans and last pygmy hippopotami of Cyprus". In Swiny, Stuart (ed.). The earliest prehistory of Cyprus: From colonization to exploitation (PDF). Cyprus American Archaeological Research Institute Monograph Series. Vol. 2. Boston: American Schools of Oriental Research. pp. 1–18. Archived from the original (PDF) on 2016-06-06.
- Simmons, Alan H. (1999). Faunal extinction in an island society: pygmy hippopotamus hunters of Cyprus. Interdisciplinary Contributions to Archaeology. Springer. ISBN 0306460882.
- Grayson, Donald K. (2000). "Faunal extinction in an island society: Pygmy hippopotamus hunters of Cyprus". Geoarchaeology. 15 (4): 379. doi:10.1002/(SICI)1520-6548(200004)15:4<379::AID-GEA7>3.0.CO;2-E.
