= Hippopotamus melitensis =

Hippopotamus melitensis Temporal range: Pleistocene

Scientific classification
- Kingdom: Animalia
- Phylum: Chordata
- Class: Mammalia
- Order: Artiodactyla
- Family: Hippopotamidae
- Genus: Hippopotamus
- Species: †H. melitensis

Binomial name
- †Hippopotamus melitensis Major, 1902

Extinct species of mammal

Hippopotamus melitensis is an extinct hippopotamus from Malta. It lived during the Middle to Late Pleistocene. It probably descended from Hippopotamus pentlandi from Sicily, which in turn probably descended from the common hippopotamus (Hippopotamus amphibius). Like Hippopotamus pentlandi, Hippopotamus melitensis is substantially smaller than H. amphibius as a result of insular dwarfism, having an estimated mass of approximately 900 kg, which is smaller than the 1100 kg estimated for H. pentlandi. The diet of H. melitensis is suggested to have been more generalist than Hippopotamus amphibius (which is predominantly a grazer), likely as a result of limited resource diversity and lack of competition, as the only other large herbivore on the island was the dwarf elephant Palaeoloxodon mnaidriensis. The majority of findings of this species are from Għar Dalam, a cave on Malta famous for its Pleistocene fossil deposits.

Fossils of H. melitensis, like those of the elephants, are absent from layers of Ghar Dalam younger than around 80,000 years old.

== See also ==
- Cyprus dwarf hippopotamus
- Cretan dwarf hippopotamus
