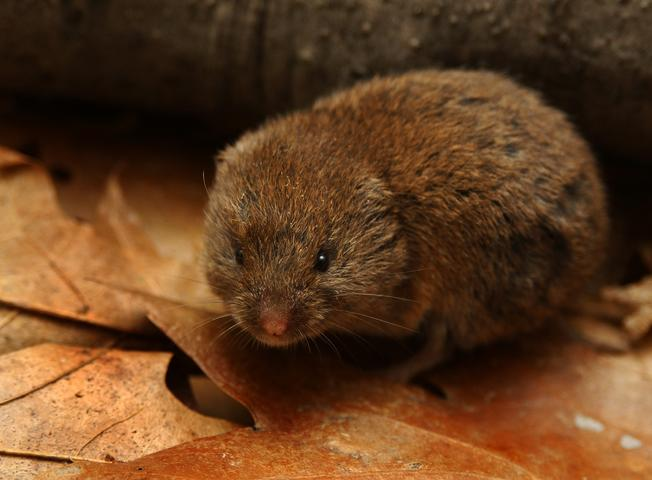
- Microtus pinetorum

Scientific classification
- Kingdom: Animalia
- Phylum: Chordata
- Class: Mammalia
- Order: Rodentia
- Family: Cricetidae
- Subfamily: Arvicolinae
- Genus: Microtus
- Subgenus: Pitymys; McMurtrie, 1831

Species
- Microtus guatemalensis Microtus oaxacensis Microtus pinetorum Microtus quasiater

= Microtus (Pitymys) =

Subgenus of rodents

Pitymys is a subgenus of voles in the genus Microtus. Species in this subgenus are:

- Guatemalan vole (Microtus guatemalensis)
- Tarabundí vole (Microtus oaxacensis)
- Woodland vole (Microtus pinetorum)
- Jalapan pine vole (Microtus quasiater)

Voles of this subgenus often show more adaptations for a fossorial mode of life.
