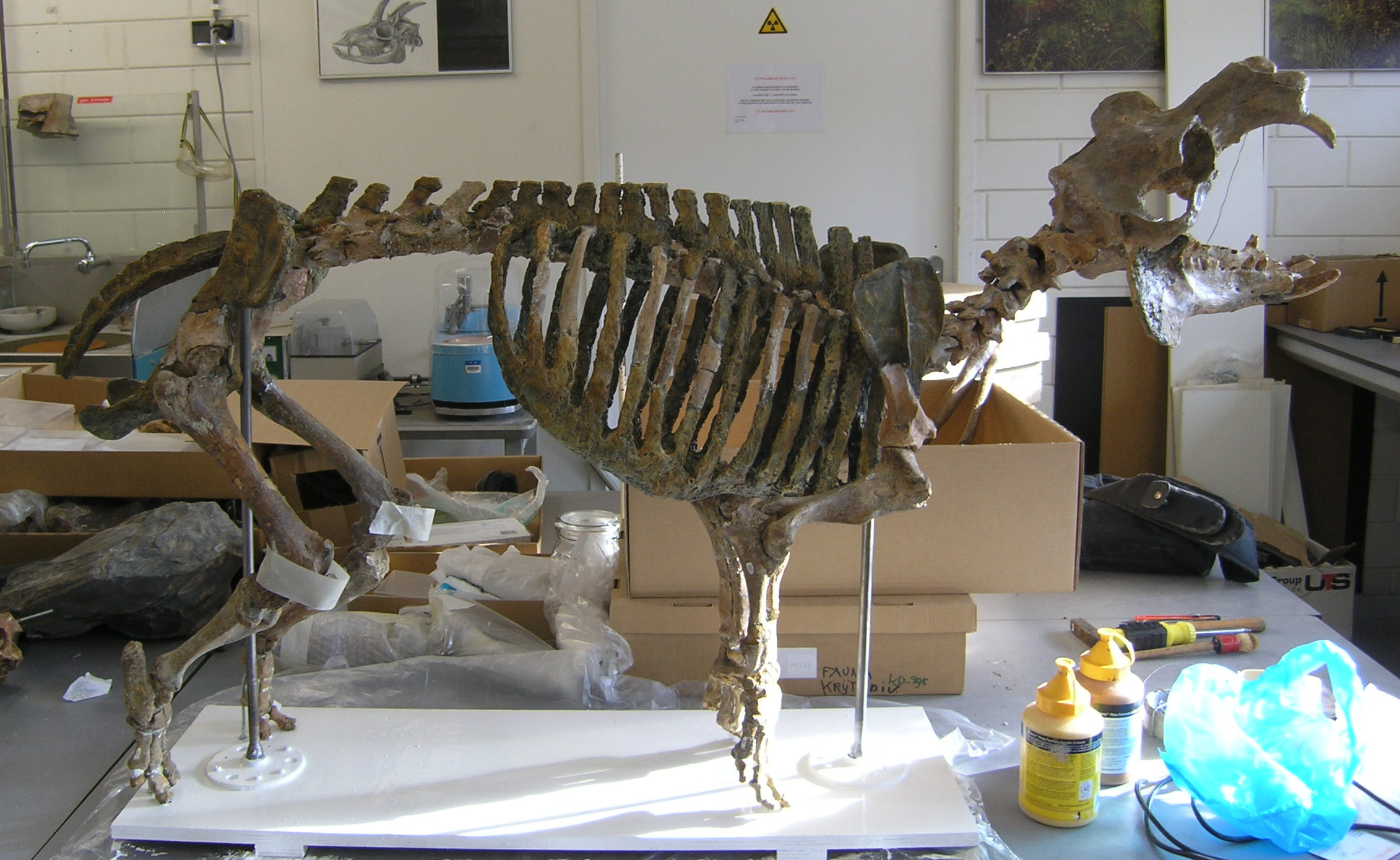
- Composite mounted skeleton of H. minor

Scientific classification
- Kingdom: Animalia
- Phylum: Chordata
- Class: Mammalia
- Order: Artiodactyla
- Family: Hippopotamidae
- Genus: Hippopotamus
- Species: †H. minor

Binomial name
- †Hippopotamus minor Desmarest, 1822

Synonyms
- Phanourios minor Sondaar and Boekschoten, 1972; Hippopotamus minutus Cuvier, 1824

= Cypriot pygmy hippopotamus =

Cypriot pygmy hippopotamus Temporal range: Middle Pleistocene to Early Holocene, 0.2–0.012 Ma

Species of mammal (fossil)

The Cypriot pygmy hippopotamus (Hippopotamus minor) is an extinct species of dwarf hippopotamus that inhabited the island of Cyprus from the Middle Pleistocene until the early Holocene. One of the smallest known hippopotamus species, it was comparable in size to the living pygmy hippopotamus, though it was more closely related to the common hippopotamus, with its small body size a result of insular dwarfism. It represented one of only two large terrestrial mammals on Cyprus alongside the Cyprus dwarf elephant. The species became extinct around 12,000 years ago following the arrival of humans on Cyprus, and potential evidence of human hunting has been found at the Aetokremnos rockshelter on the southern coast of the island.

== History of discovery and taxonomy ==
Bones of fossil mammals have been known on Cyprus since at least the 15th century, when Cypriot historian Leontios Machairas reported that bones exposed in the Kyrenia/Pentadactylos mountains in the northern part of Cyprus were believed by locals to be the bones of Maronite Christians who had fled to the island, which they regarded as saints. An account from a later historian, Benedetto Bordone published in 1528, reporting on a similar deposit in the Kyrenia mountains, recounted that locals ground the bones into powder to make a potion they thought could cure many diseases. In 1698, the Dutch traveller Cornelis de Bruijn, remarking on another Kyrenia mountains bone deposit, made several images of bones he found, which he thought were deposited by the Biblical great flood. The remains in one of these images, which he identified as human, is now retrospectively identified as remains of the Cypriot pygmy hippopotamus.

The earliest scientific description of the species was given by French paleontologist Anselme Gaëtan Desmarest in 1822, who gave the current name Hippopotamus minor. The species Hippopotamus minutus named shortly after by Georges Cuvier in 1824 is now regarded as a junior synonym. Both authors were unaware of the origin of the specimens which were in the collections of a French museum in Paris, with Desmarest and Cuvier both suggesting that the specimens originated from southern France. Additional remains of the species were collected from Cyprus by British paleontologist Dorothea Bate in 1901, which led Charles Immanuel Forsyth Major to recognise material in the Paris collection as also originating from Cyprus. The species is now known from over 20 localities across the island. In 1972, the species was placed in the new genus Phanourios by Paul Yves Sondaar and Gijsbert Jan Boekschoten after Saint Phanourios which local Cypriots associated with its bones. However this placement has been questioned due to the fact that it is widely agreed that the species descends from a species of the genus Hippopotamus, and other authors have continued to use the combination Hippopotamus minor.

== Evolution ==
A partial mitochondrial genome obtained from H. minor suggests that its closest living relative is the common hippopotamus (Hippopotamus amphibius), with an estimated genetic divergence between 1.36 and 1.58 million years ago. The ancestor of the Cypriot pygmy hippopotamus is uncertain, but is likely either H. amphibius or the extinct species Hippopotamus antiquus. The timing of the colonisation is uncertain, though the earliest fossils date to around 219–185,000 years ago, during the late Middle Pleistocene. Due to Cyprus never having been connected to the mainland, its ancestors must have arrived via crossing the Mediterranean, perhaps as the result of a rare cataclysmic flooding event. Its small body size is due to insular dwarfism, a common phenomenon on islands.

== Description and ecology ==
Size comparison of the Cypriot pygmy hippopotamus compared to humans

The Cypriot pygmy hippopotamus is the smallest known hippopotamus species, along with the roughly same-sized living African pygmy hippopotamus (Choeropsis liberiensis). The Cypriot pygmy hippopotamus is estimated to have had a body mass of around 130 kilograms (290 lb), a height of 70 cm (2.3 ft) and a length of 125 cm (4.1 ft), an over 90% reduction in size from its mainland ancestor. Compared to H. amphibius, the muzzle region of the skull is much shorter, resembling the condition found in the African pygmy hippopotamus. The cranial cavity containing the brain is proportionally significantly larger relative to skull size than in H. amphibius. The sagittal crest at the top of the skull is only weakly developed, and the eye sockets are relatively large compared to skull size, and are orientated more forwards and less upwards (dorsally) than the common hippopotamus, which indicates that the neutral head posture was likely higher than that of the common hippopotamus, though the convergence angle (the degree to which the eyes face outwards to the sides) is similar to that of H. amphibius. Specimens of H. minor either have lower jaws with broad fronts with large canine teeth, or narrow fronts with small canines, which likely reflects sexual dimorphism, with the large canine-form likely representing males. This may have been related to males biting the neck of females during mating, as occurs in common hippopotamuses.

The cheek teeth of H. minor, particularly the molars, have a high relief in comparison to living hippopotamuses, and are brachydont (less high crowned) compared to those of H. amphibius, suggesting that H. minor probably occupied a browsing niche, in contrast to the grazing predominant diet of modern Hippopotamus amphibius, though its diet is likely to have varied in correspondence to glacial cycle-induced climatic changes. Unlike other species of the genus Hippopotamus, the upper fourth premolar has been lost, possibly as a result of the skull shortening. The loss of the upper fourth premolar probably allowed the Cypriot pygmy hippopotamus to engage in more efficient chewing utilizing side-to side (lateral) motion, which is largely prevented in the living common hippopotamus by the large lower incisors at the front of the mouth. This supposition is supported by different wear patterns on the incisor teeth of Cypriot pygmy hippopotamuses in comparison to common hippopotamuses.

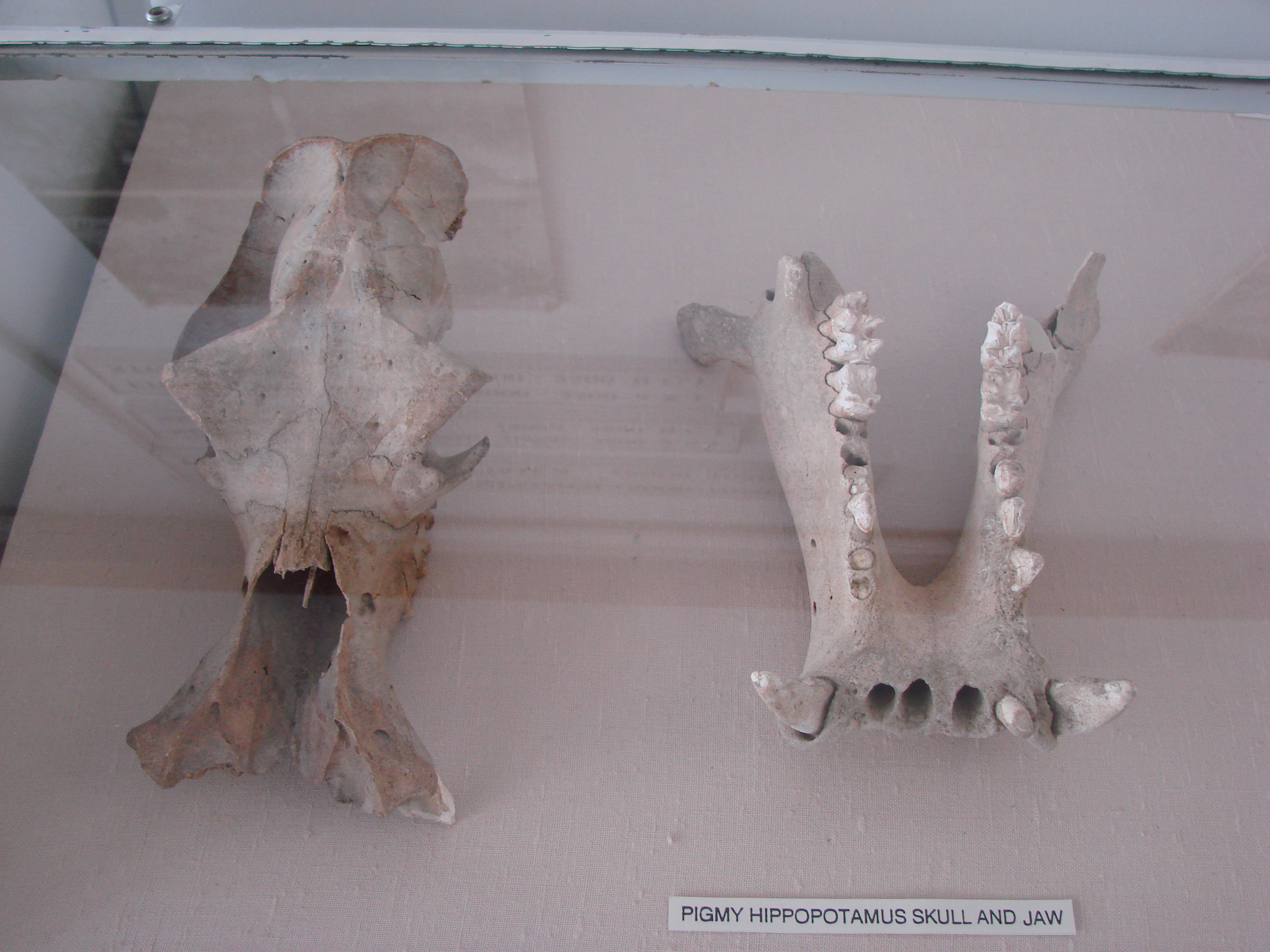
Skull and jaw of a Cypriot dwarf hippo

Analysis of the limb and hand bones suggests that it was more terrestrial than its living relatives, having a unique form of locomotion distinct from modern hippopotamuses that allowed it to move efficiently on the mountainous and rocky terrain of Cyprus, with changes including the shortening of the distal (closest to foot) part of the legs, and increased robustness of the limb bones, as well as increased rigidity and stability of some of the limb joints. It probably habitually moved slowly, moreso than living hippopotamuses, and was probably incapable of running quickly. A 2016 study suggested that it grew more slowly than living hippopotamuses.

During the Late Pleistocene, the Cypriot pygmy hippopotamus, along with the similarly sized Cyprus dwarf elephant, were the only large mammals native to the islands, and one of only four native terrestrial mammal species, alongside the still living Cypriot mouse and the extinct genet species Genetta plesictoides, and had no natural predators. Remains of the dwarf hippopotamus are abundant at localities where it is found, considerably moreso than the dwarf elephant.

== Extinction ==
The youngest remains of the species date to the end of the Pleistocene, around 13–12,000 years ago, around the same time as the youngest remains of the dwarf elephant species. These dates roughly coincide with the oldest evidence of human habitation of Cyprus. Over 200,000 bones of H. minor, representing over 500 individuals, are associated with human artifacts at the Aetokremnos rockshelter on the southern coast of Cyprus, dating to approximately 13–12,000 years Before Present, representing among the youngest records of the species, which is suggested by some authors to provide evidence that the Cypriot pygmy hippopotamus was hunted and driven to extinction by the early human residents of Cyprus. However, these suggestions have been contested, in part due to a lack of cut marks on the bones that would definitively indicate butchery, with an alternative proposal that bones at Aetokremnos accumulated naturally over hundreds of years, with the human occupation of the site after the bones were initially deposited.

A 2024 study estimated that at the time of human arrival, the population of dwarf hippopotamus on Cyprus was around 14,300 individuals. The study suggested that harvesting over 650 dwarf hippos per year would have put the species at risk of extinction, with extinction becoming nearly certain with over 1000 individuals harvested per year (realistically accomplishable with a human population of only a few thousand people likely present on Cyprus during this time). This likely would have resulted in a relatively rapid extinction following the colonisation at Cyprus, with the author estimating a latest possible extinction date (taking into account the Signor-Lipps effect) of around 12,000-11,000 years ago.

== See also ==
- Cretan dwarf hippopotamus
- Maltese dwarf hippopotamus
- Sicilian dwarf hippopotamus
- Cyprus dwarf elephant
