= Hypo =

Hypo may be short for:

- Hypoglycemia, low blood glucose(sugar)
- Hypodermic needle, syringe, or injection
- Hypothecation
- Hypo Real Estate, a German banking group
- Hypothekenbank, a type of bank in German speaking countries
  - in Austria
    - Hypo Alpe Adria Bank, former Kärntner Landes-Hypothekenbank
    - HYPO Steiermark, brand name of Landes-Hypothekenbank Steiermark
    - HYPO Salzburg, brand name of Salzburger Landes-Hypothekenbank
    - HYPO Oberösterreich, brand name of Oberösterreichische Landesbank
    - Hypo Landesbank Vorarlberg
    - Hypo Tirol Bank
    - Hypo Noe Gruppe
    - Hypo Verband, brand name of Verband der österreichischen Landes-Hypothekenbanken

HYPO may refer to:

- Station HYPO, a signals monitoring and cryptographic intelligence unit

Hypo in chemistry may refer to:

- Sodium thiosulfate, a chemical compound used in photographic processing.
