= Hippopotamus creutzburgi =

Cretan dwarf hippopotamus Temporal range: Pleistocene

Scientific classification
- Kingdom: Animalia
- Phylum: Chordata
- Class: Mammalia
- Order: Artiodactyla
- Family: Hippopotamidae
- Genus: Hippopotamus
- Species: †H. creutzburgi

Binomial name
- †Hippopotamus creutzburgi Boekschoten & Sondaar, 1966

Extinct species of mammal

Hippopotamus creutzburgi, the Cretan dwarf hippopotamus, is an extinct species of hippopotamus from the island of Crete. It lived on the island from the Early Pleistocene to early Middle Pleistocene, and probably descended from Hippopotamus antiquus. It was considerably smaller than H. antiquus, weighing approximately 400 kilograms (880 lb), an example of insular dwarfism. It was one of only two large herbivores on the island during its existence, alongside the dwarf mammoth Mammuthus creticus, with large predators being absent, the only other species of mammal present on the island being the giant rat Kritimys. It is known from abundant remains collected from the Katharo basin in the eastern uplands of Crete, approximately 1,100–1,200 metres (3,600–3,900 ft) above sea level, as well as much rarer remains found in coastal caves.

Like most other insular dwarf hippopotamids, its snout is proportionally shorter than in the living hippopotamus, with a relatively narrow palate. The lower jaw is sexually dimorphic, with those of males having larger caine and a longer joint between the two halves of the lower jaw (mandibular symphysis). Analysis of its limbs suggests that it was more adapted to terrestrial locomotion than living hippopotamus, primarily walking on its hooves rather than its footpads as in living hippopotamus, and capable of traversing the rugged terrain of Crete. Analysis of its teeth suggests that it had a grazing diet, similar to modern Hippopotamus amphibius. The previous suggestion that the species can be divided into two subspecies is not supported by modern research.

The first remains of the species were described in 1845 by Richard Owen. They were subsequently subject to a long and convoluted taxonomic history, before the species name H. creutzburgi was coined by Boekschoten & Sondaar in 1966.

== See also ==
- Cyprus dwarf hippopotamus
- Hippopotamus melitensis
- Hippopotamus pentlandi
