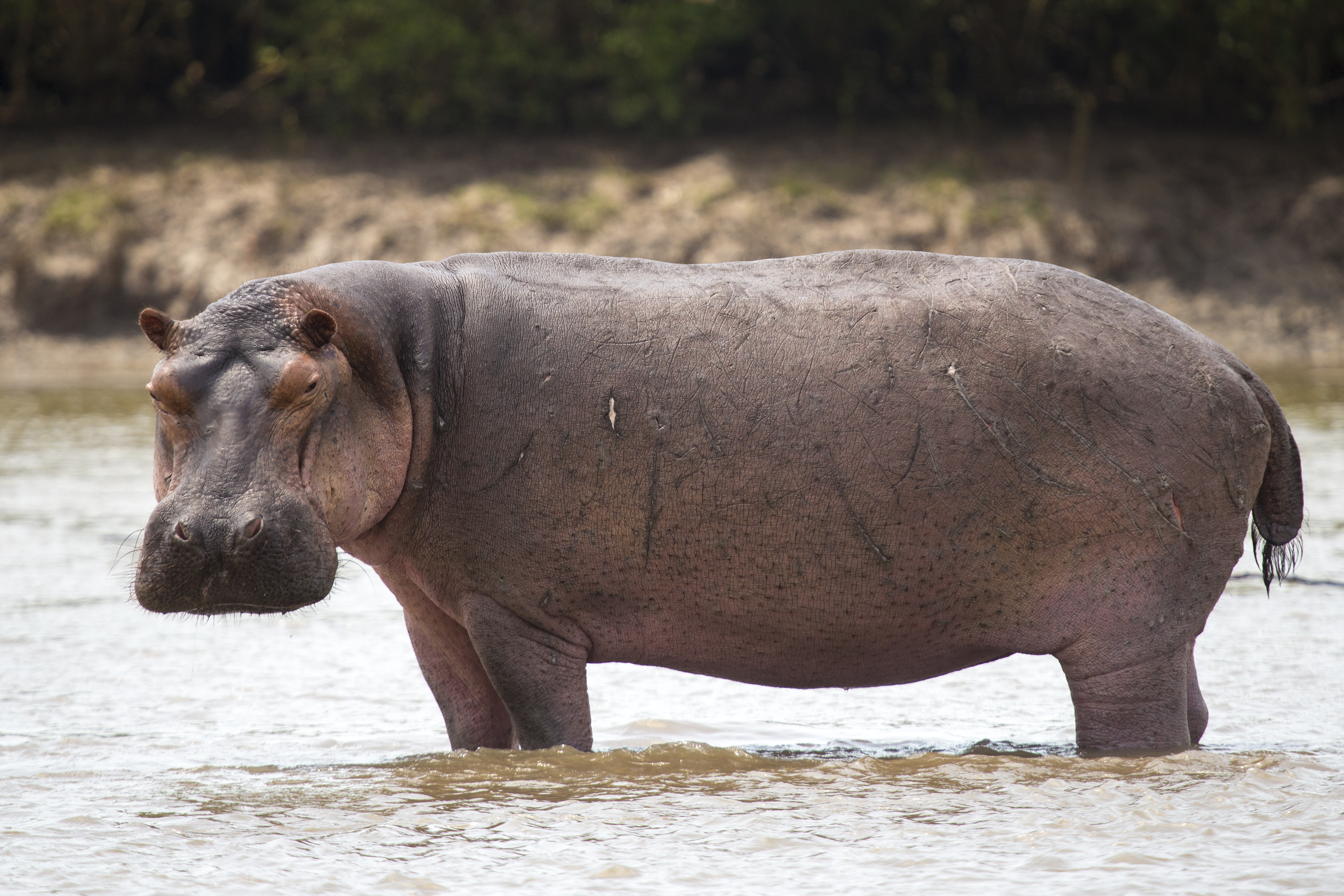
- A hippopotamus in Saadani National Park, Tanzania

Conservation status
- Vulnerable (IUCN 3.1)
- CITES Appendix II

Scientific classification
- Kingdom: Animalia
- Phylum: Chordata
- Class: Mammalia
- Order: Artiodactyla
- Family: Hippopotamidae
- Genus: Hippopotamus
- Species: H. amphibius

Binomial name
- Hippopotamus amphibius Linnaeus, 1758
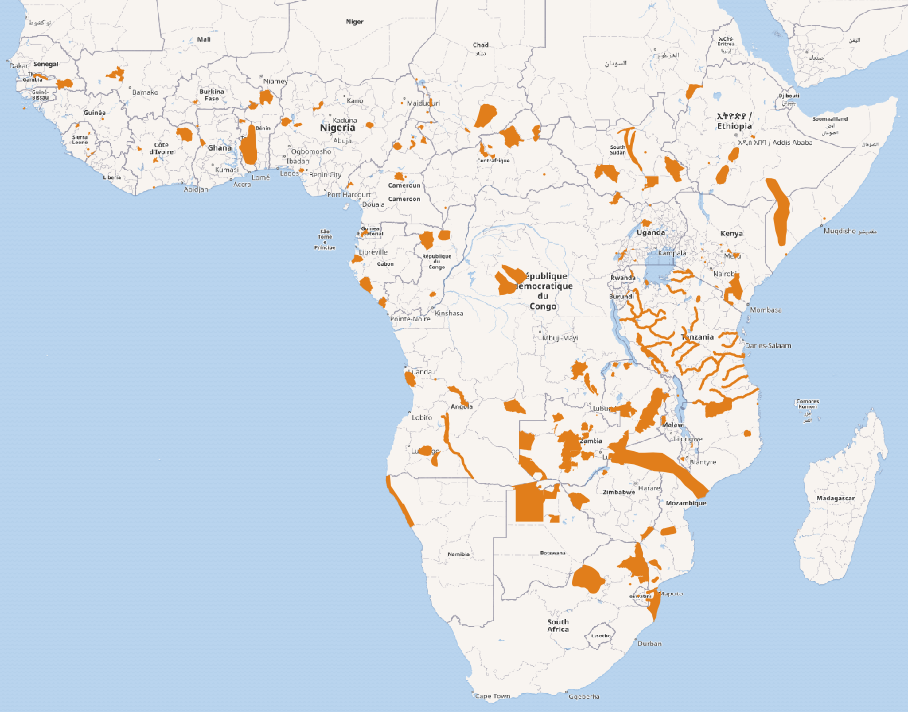
- Current distribution of the hippopotamus

= Hippopotamus =

Hippopotamus Temporal range: Pleistocene–Recent

Species of large semi-aquatic mammal

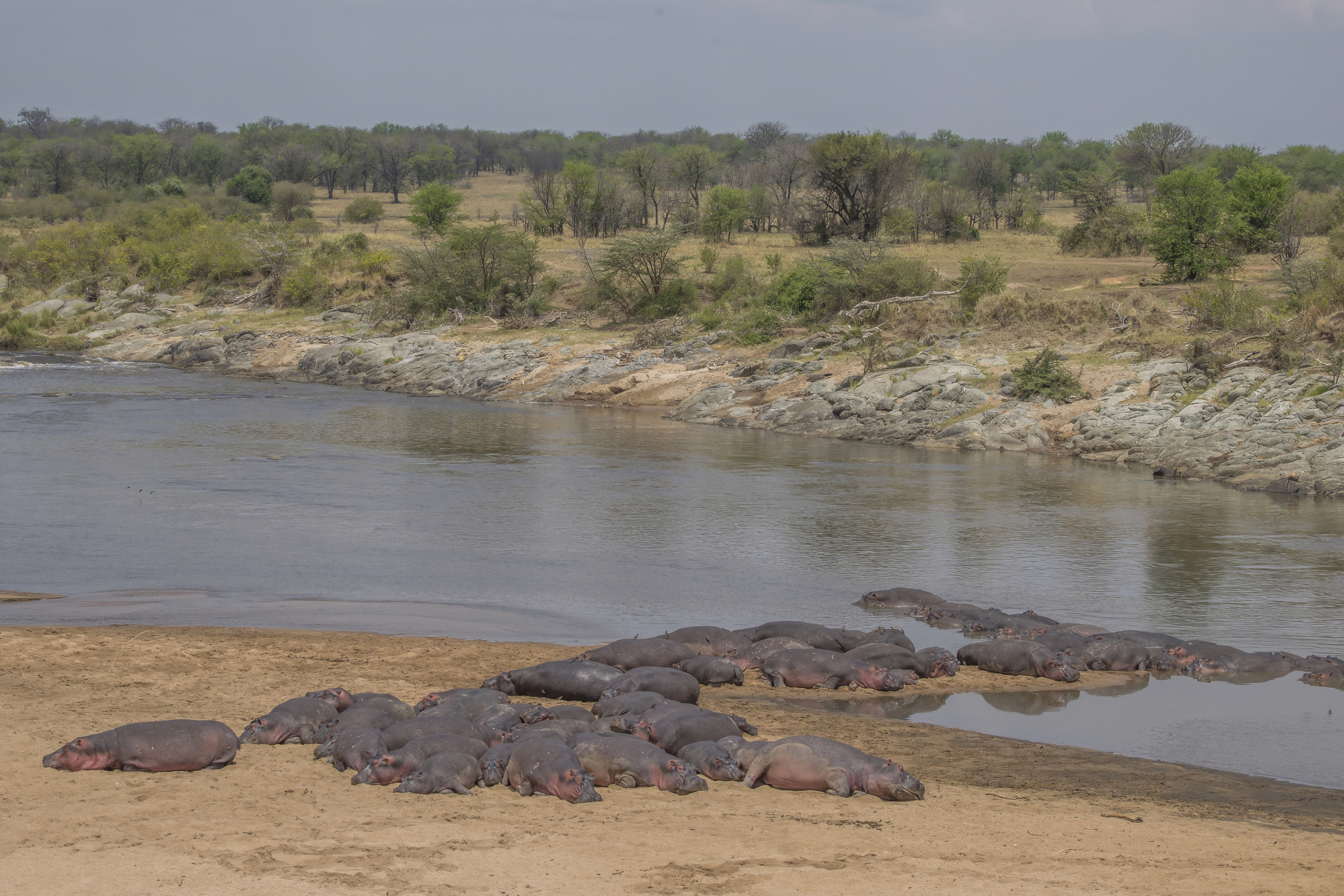
H. a. kiboko territorial male with females and calves, Serengeti National Park, Tanzania

The hippopotamus (Hippopotamus amphibius; /ˌhɪpəˈpɒtəməs/; pl.: hippopotamuses or hippopotami), often shortened to hippo (pl.: hippos), further qualified as the common hippopotamus, Nile hippopotamus and river hippopotamus, is a large semiaquatic mammal native to sub-Saharan Africa. It is one of only two extant species in the family Hippopotamidae, the other being the pygmy hippopotamus (Choeropsis liberiensis or Hexaprotodon liberiensis). Its name comes from the Ancient Greek for "river horse" (ἱπποπόταμος).

After elephants and rhinoceroses, the hippopotamus is the next largest land mammal. It is also the largest extant land artiodactyl. Despite their physical resemblance to pigs and other terrestrial even-toed ungulates, the closest living relatives of the hippopotamids are cetaceans (whales, dolphins, porpoises, etc.), from which they diverged about 55 million years ago. Hippos are recognisable for their barrel-shaped torsos, wide-opening mouths with large canine tusks, nearly hairless bodies, short legs, and large size: adults average 1.5 t (1.7 short tons) for bulls (males) and 1.3 t (1.4 short tons) for cows (females).

Hippos inhabit rivers, lakes, and mangrove swamps. Territorial bulls each preside over a stretch of water and a group of five to thirty cows and calves. Mating and birth both occur in the water. During the day, hippos remain cool by staying in water or mud, emerging at dusk to graze on grasses. While hippos rest near each other in the water, grazing is a solitary activity and hippos typically do not display territorial behaviour on land. Hippos are among the most dangerous animals in the world due to their aggressive and unpredictable nature. They are threatened by habitat loss and poaching for their meat and ivory (canine teeth).

== Etymology ==
The Latin word hippopotamus is derived from the Ancient Greek ἱπποπόταμος (hippopótamos), from ἵππος (híppos) 'horse' and ποταμός (potamós) 'river', together meaning 'horse of the river'. In English, the usual plural is "hippopotamuses".

== Taxonomy and origins ==
=== Classification ===
The common hippopotamus and the pygmy hippopotamus are the only living members of the family Hippopotamidae. Some taxonomists place hippos and anthracotheres in the superfamily Anthracotheroidea. Hippopotamidae are classified along with other even-toed ungulates in the order Artiodactyla.

Five subspecies of hippos have been described based on morphological differences in their skulls as well as differences in geographical range:

- H. a. amphibius – (the nominate subspecies) ranges from Gambia east to Ethiopia and then south to Mozambique and historically ranged as far north as Egypt; its skull is distinguished by a moderately reduced preorbital region, a bulging dorsal surface, elongated mandibular symphysis and larger chewing teeth.
- H. a. kiboko – found in Tanzania, Kenya and Somalia; was noted to be smaller and more lightly coloured than other hippos with wider nostrils, somewhat longer snout and more rounded and relatively raised orbits with the space between them being incurved.
- H. a. capensis – found in Zambia and South Africa; distinguished by wider orbits.
- H. a. tschadensis – ranges between Chad and Niger; featured a slightly shorter but broader face, and pronounced, forward-facing orbits.
- H. a. constrictus – ranges from the southern Democratic Republic of Congo to Angola and Namibia; skull characterised by a thicker preorbital region, shorter snout, flatter dorsal surface, reduced mandibular symphysis and smaller chewing teeth.

The suggested subspecies above were never widely used or validated by field biologists; the described morphological differences were small enough that they could have resulted from simple variation in nonrepresentative samples. A study examining mitochondrial DNA from skin biopsies taken from 13 sampling locations found "low, but significant, genetic differentiation" among H. a. amphibius, H. a. capensis, and H. a. kiboko. Neither H. a. tschadensis nor H. a. constrictus have been tested.

=== Evolution ===
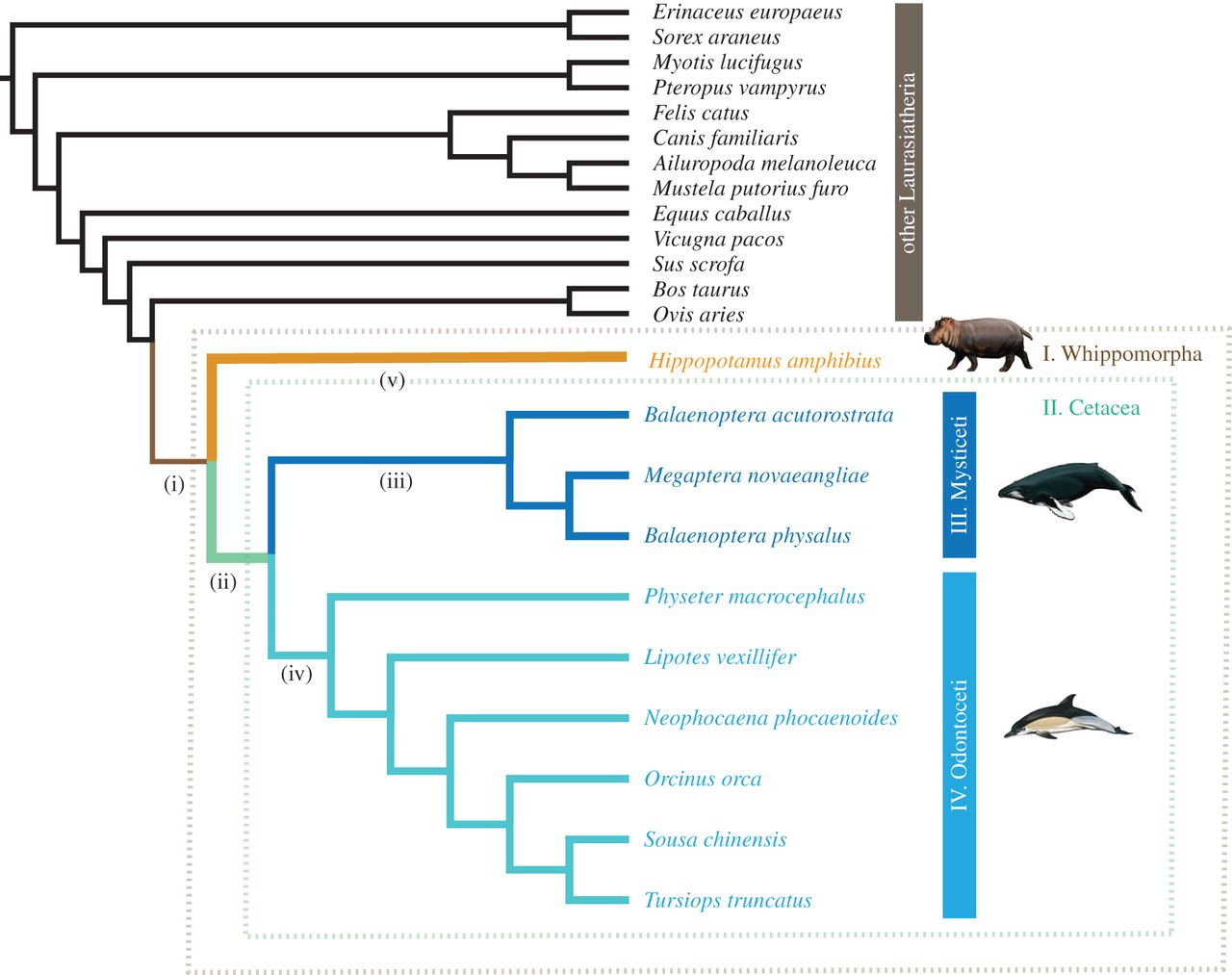
Evolutionary relationships among hippo and Cetacea (whales, dolphins)

Until 1909, naturalists classified hippos together with pigs based on molar patterns. Several lines of evidence, first from blood proteins, then from molecular systematics, DNA and the fossil record, show their closest living relatives are cetaceans (whales, dolphins, and porpoises). The common ancestor of hippos and whales branched off from Ruminantia and the rest of the even-toed ungulates; the cetacean and hippo lineages split soon afterwards.

- Artiodactyla
  - Tylopoda
  - Artiofabula
    - Suina
    - Cetruminantia
      - Ruminantia
      - Whippomorpha
        - Hippopotamidae
        - Cetacea

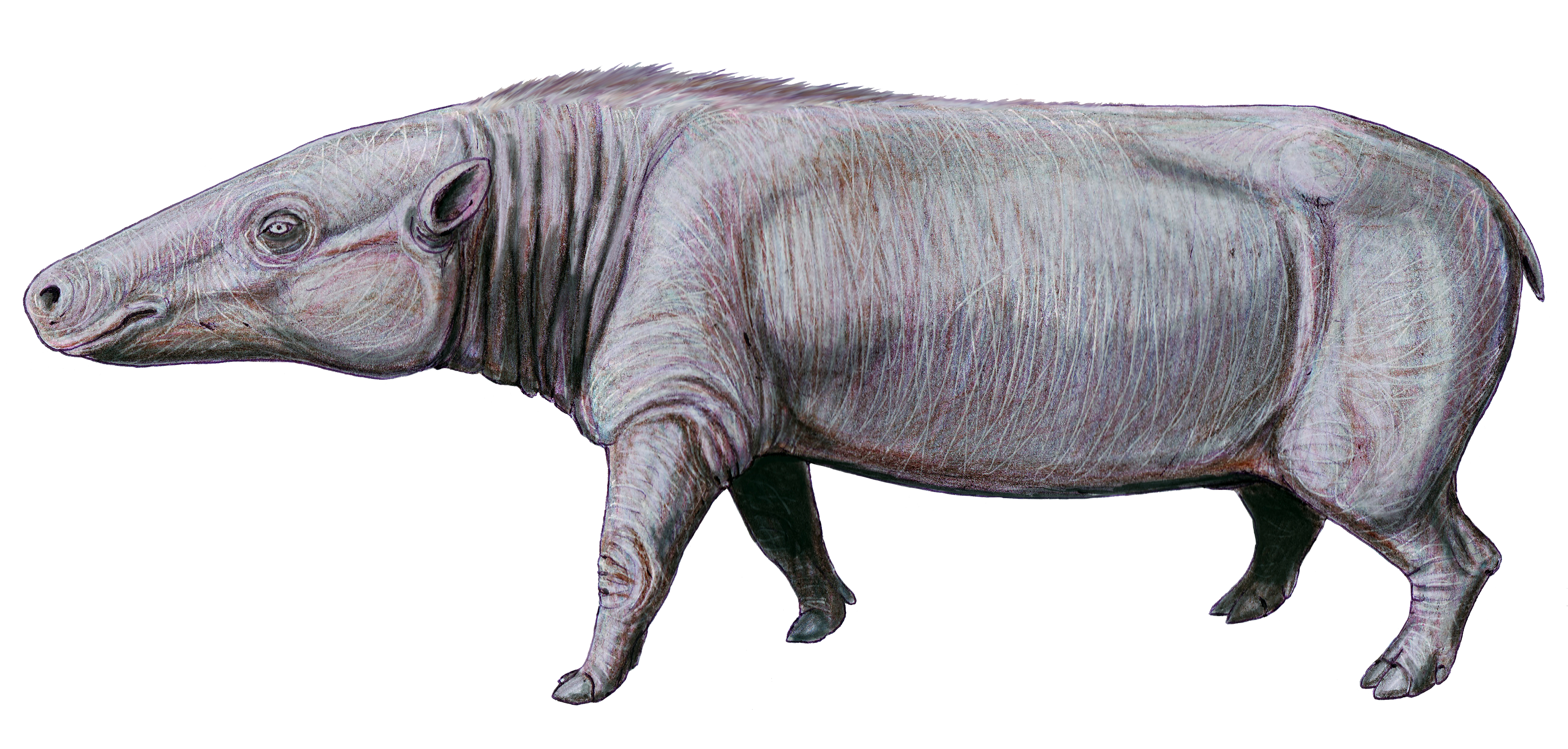
Anthracotherium magnum from the Oligocene of Europe

The most recent theory of the origins of Hippopotamidae suggests hippos and whales shared a common semiaquatic ancestor that branched off from other artiodactyls around 60 million years ago. This hypothesised ancestral group likely split into two branches again around 54 million years ago.

One branch would evolve into cetaceans, possibly beginning about 52 million years ago, with the protowhale Pakicetus and other early whale ancestors collectively known as Archaeoceti. This group eventually underwent aquatic adaptation into the completely aquatic cetaceans. The other branch became the anthracotheres, a large family of four-legged beasts, the earliest of which in the late Eocene would have resembled skinny hippos with comparatively smaller, narrower heads. All branches of the anthracotheres, except that which evolved into Hippopotamidae, became extinct during the Pliocene, leaving no descendants.

A rough evolutionary lineage of the hippo can thus be traced from Eocene and Oligocene species: from Anthracotherium and Elomeryx to the Miocene species Merycopotamus and Libycosaurus and finally the very latest anthracotheres in the Pliocene. These groups lived across Eurasia and Africa. The discovery of Epirigenys in East Africa, which was likely a descent of Asian anthracotheres and a sister taxon to Hippopotamidae, suggests that hippo ancestors entered Africa from Asia around 35 million years ago. An early hippopotamid is the genus Kenyapotamus, which lived in Africa from 15 to 9 million years ago. Hippopotamid species would spread across Africa and Eurasia, including the modern pygmy hippo. From 7.5 to 1.8 million years ago, a possible ancestor to the modern hippo, Archaeopotamus, lived in Africa and the Middle East. The oldest records of the genus Hippopotamus date to the Pliocene (5.3–2.6 million years ago). The oldest unambiguous records of the modern H. amphibius date to the Middle Pleistocene, though there are possible Early Pleistocene records.

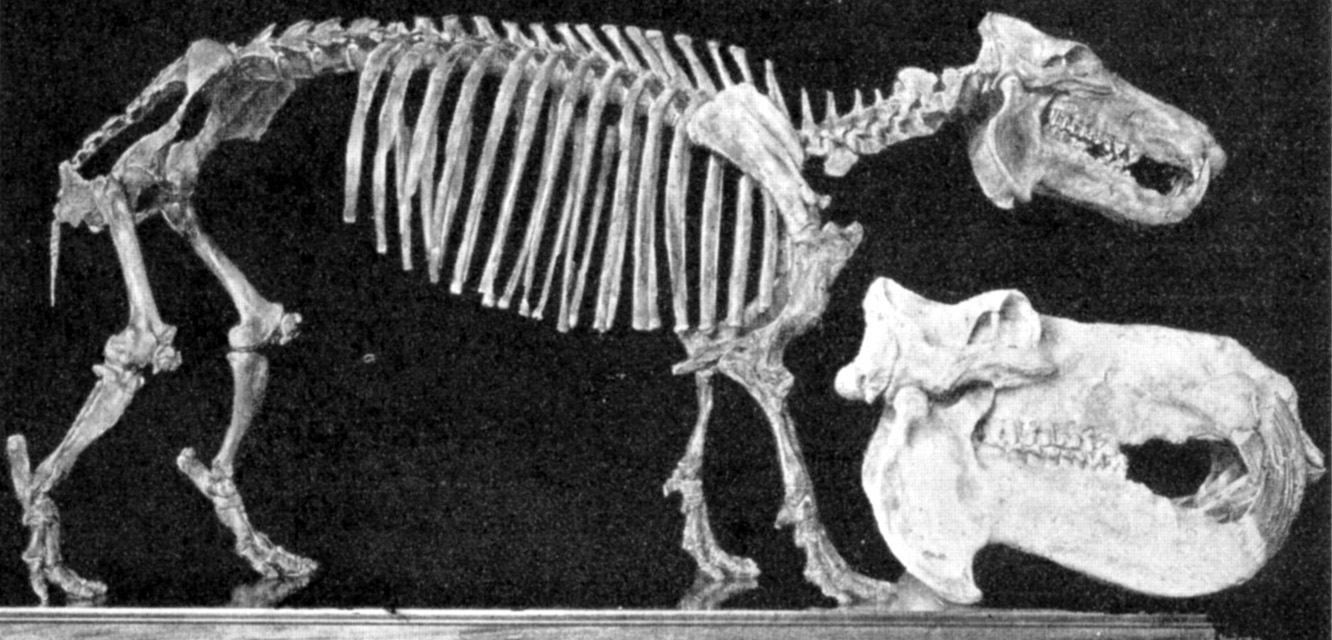
Choeropsis madagascariensis skeleton with a modern hippopotamus skull

=== Extinct species ===
Three species of Malagasy hippopotamus became extinct during the Holocene on Madagascar, the last of them within the past 1,000 years. The Malagasy hippos were smaller than the modern hippo, likely a result of the process of insular dwarfism. Fossil evidence indicates many Malagasy hippos were hunted by humans, a factor in their eventual extinction. Isolated individual Malagasy hippos may have survived in remote pockets; in 1976, villagers described a living animal called the kilopilopitsofy, which may have been a Malagasy hippo.

Hippopotamus gorgops from the Early Pleistocene to the early Middle Pleistocene of Africa and West Asia grew considerably larger than the living hippopotamus, with an estimated body mass of over 4,000 kg (8,800 lb). Hippopotamus antiquus ranged throughout Europe, extending as far north as Britain during the Early and Middle Pleistocene epochs, before being replaced by the modern H. amphibius in Europe during the latter part of the Middle Pleistocene. The Pleistocene also saw a number of dwarf species evolve on several Mediterranean islands, including Crete (Hippopotamus creutzburgi), Cyprus (the Cyprus dwarf hippopotamus, Hippopotamus minor), Malta (Hippopotamus melitensis), and Sicily (Hippopotamus pentlandi). Of these, the Cyprus dwarf hippo survived until the end of the Pleistocene or early Holocene. Evidence from the archaeological site Aetokremnos continues to cause debate on whether or not the species was driven to extinction or even encountered by humans.

== Characteristics ==
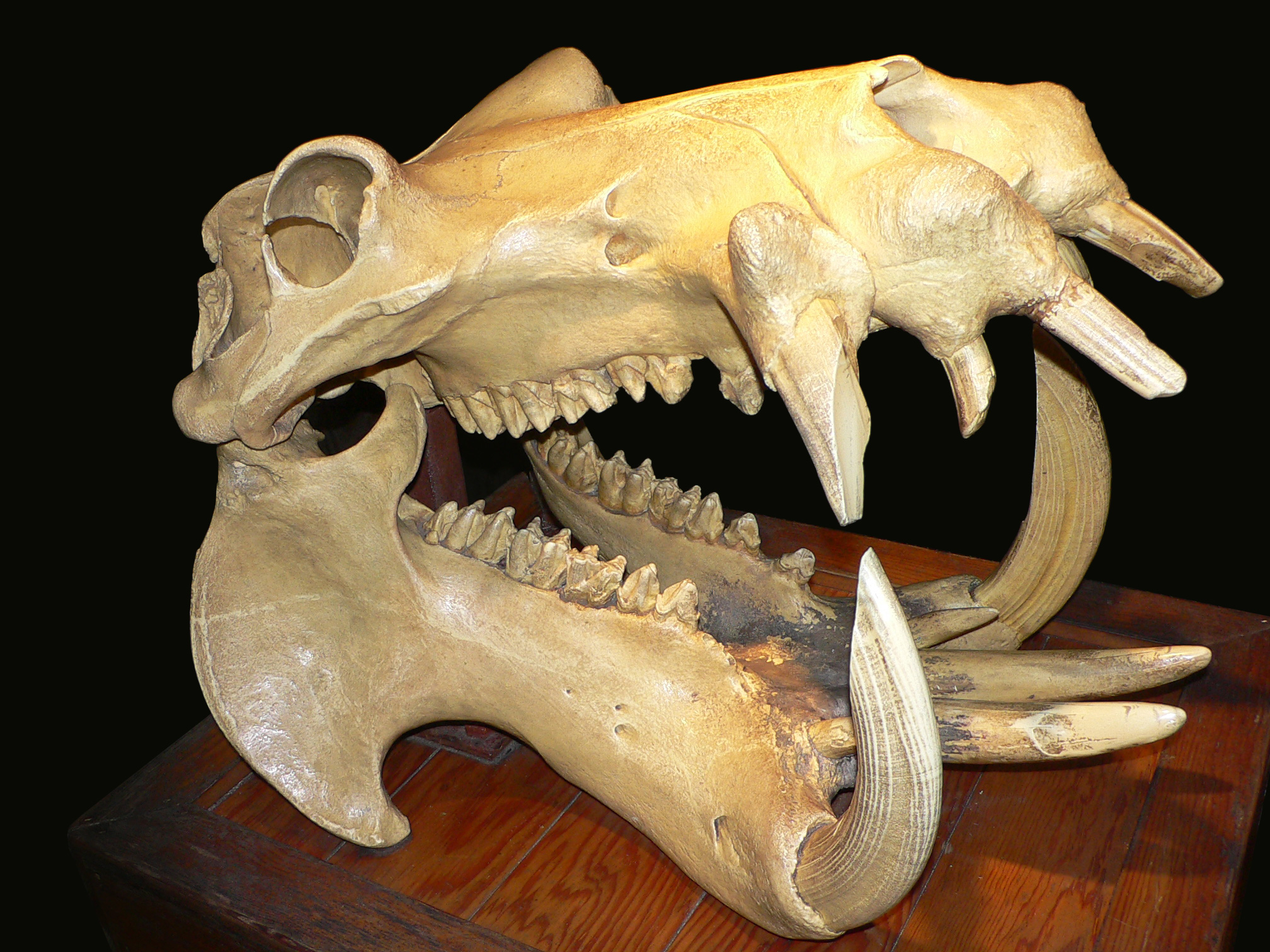
Hippopotamus skull, showing the large canines and incisors used for fighting

The hippopotamus is a megaherbivore and is the third-largest land mammal after elephants and some rhinoceros species. The mean adult weight is around 1.48 t (1.63 short tons) for bulls and 1.365 t (1.505 short tons) for cows. Exceptionally large males have been recorded reaching 2.66 t (2.93 short tons). Male hippos appear to continue growing throughout their lives, while females reach maximum weight at around age 25. It is 2.90 to 5.05 m (9 ft 6 in to 16 ft 7 in) long, including a tail of about 35 to 56 cm (1 ft 2 in to 1 ft 10 in) in length and 1.30 to 1.65 m (4 ft 3 in to 5 ft 5 in) tall at the shoulder, with males and females ranging 1.40 to 1.65 m (4 ft 7 in to 5 ft 5 in) and 1.30 to 1.45 m (4 ft 3 in to 4 ft 9 in) tall at the shoulder respectively. The species has a typical head–body length of 3.3–3.45 m (10.8–11.3 ft) and an average standing height of 1.4 m (4 ft 7 in) at the shoulder.

Hippos have barrel-shaped bodies with short tails and legs, and an hourglass-shaped skull with a long snout. Their skeletal structures are graviportal, adapted to carrying their enormous weight, and their dense bones and low centre of gravity allows them to sink and move along the bottom of the water. Hippopotamuses have small legs (relative to other megafauna) because the water in which they live reduces the weight burden. The toes are webbed and the pelvis rests at an angle of 45 degrees. Though chubby-looking, hippos have little fat. The eyes, ears, and nostrils of hippos are placed high on the roof of their skulls. This allows these organs to remain above the surface while the rest of the body is submerged. The nostrils and ears can close when underwater while nictitating membranes cover the eyes. The vocal folds of the hippo are more horizontally positioned, much like baleen whales. Underneath are throat tissues, where vibrations are transmitted to produce underwater calls.

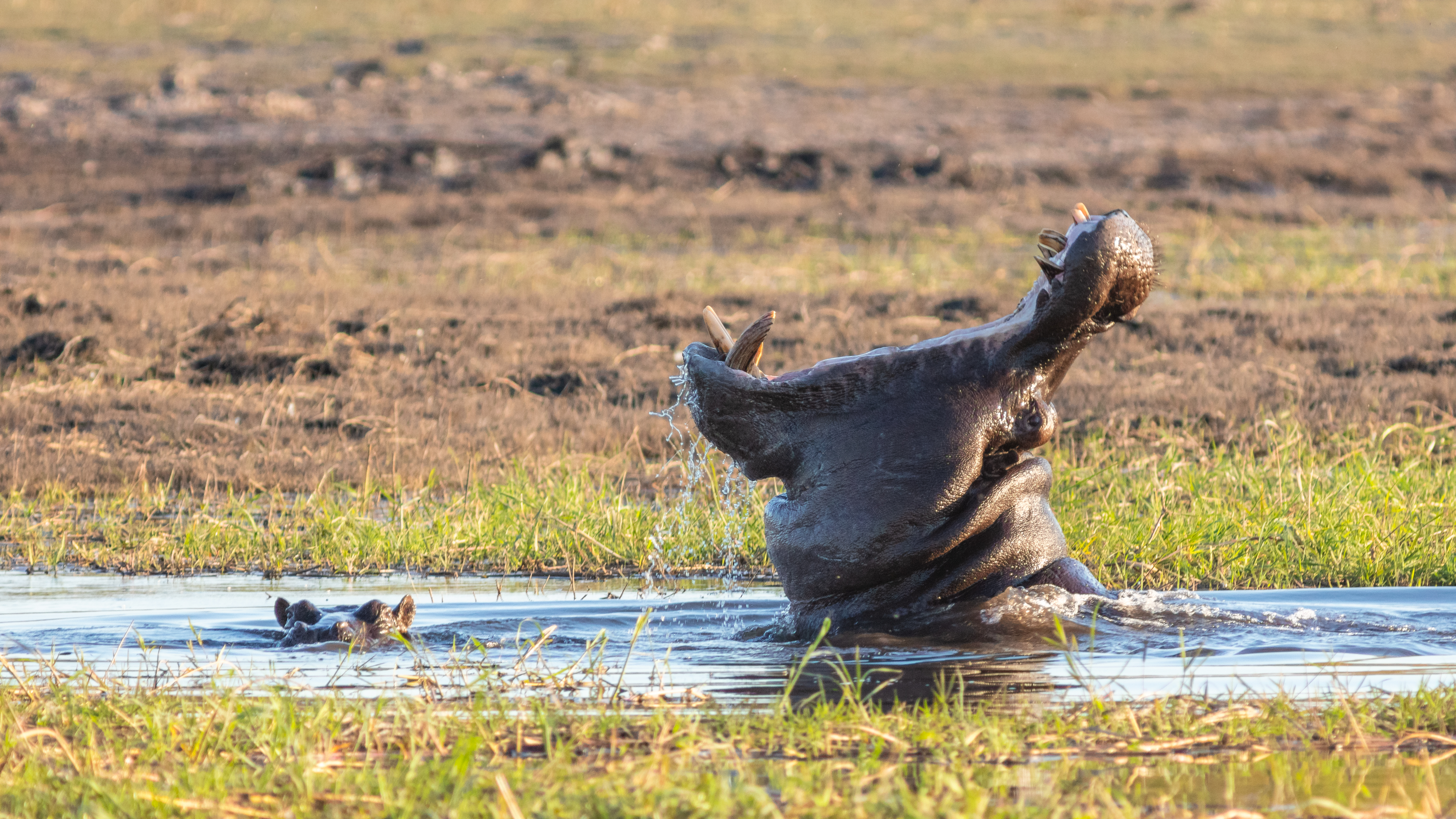
Characteristic "yawn" of a hippo

The hippo's jaw is powered by huge masseter and digastric muscles, and the hinge is located far back enough so that they can open their mouths at 100–110 degrees. Extensions at the back of the jaw create more surface area for muscle attachment, which gives them large, droopy cheeks This allows them to achieve their gape without tearing any tissue. On the lower jaw, the incisors and canines grow continuously, the former reaching 40 cm (16 in), while the latter can grow to up to 50 cm (20 in). The lower canines are sharpened through contact with the smaller upper canines. The canines and incisors are used mainly for combat instead of feeding, and the jaws are too rigid for side to side motion, making them less efficient for chewing. Hippos rely on their flattened, horny lips to grasp and pull grasses which are then passed to the molars, and ground on the complex enamel folds. The hippo is considered to be a pseudoruminant; it has a complex three-chambered stomach, but does not "chew cud".

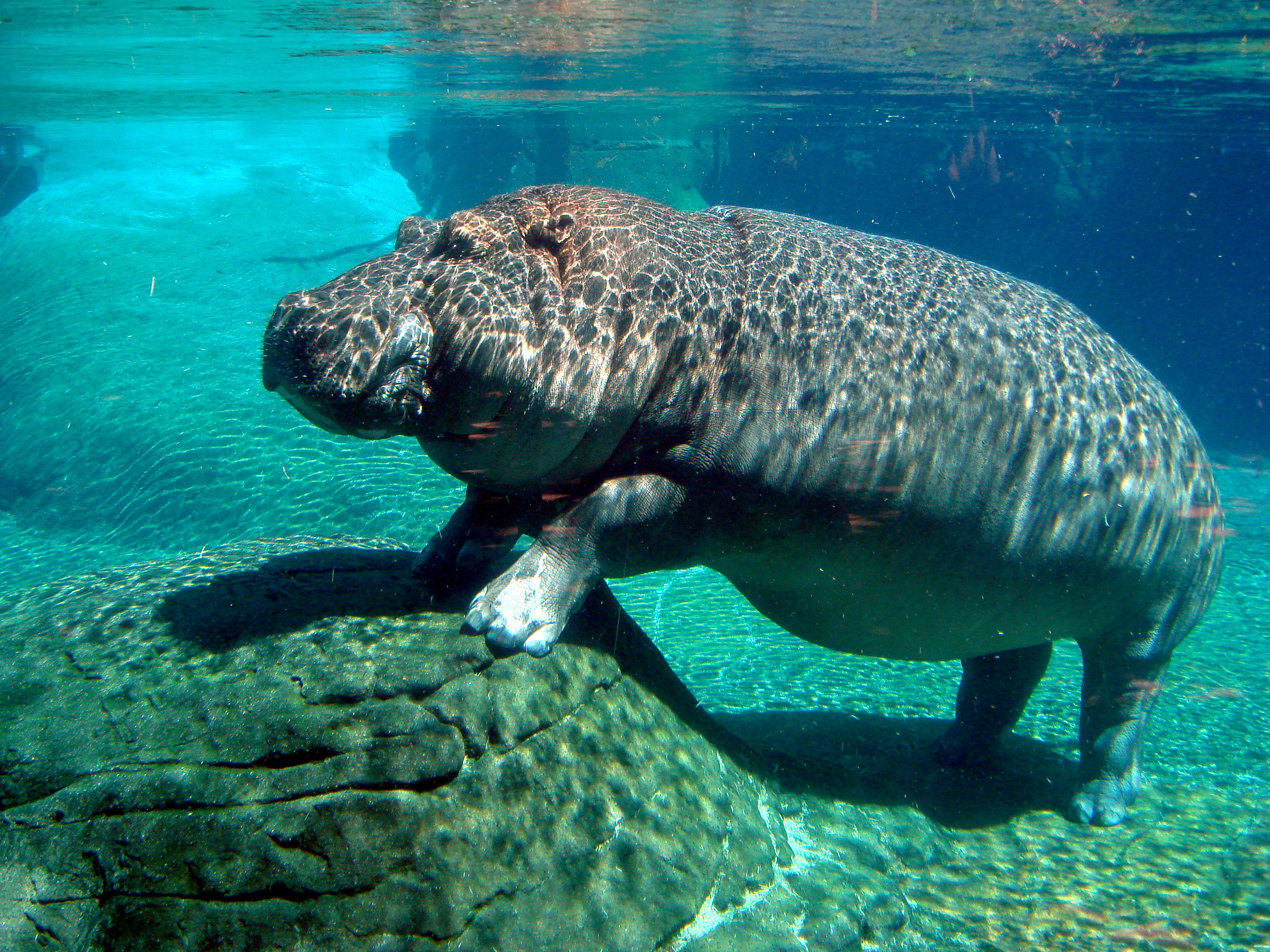
Completely submerged hippo (San Diego Zoo)

Hippo skin is 6 cm (2.4 in) thick across much of its body with little hair. The animal is mostly purplish-grey or blue-black, but brownish-pink on the underside and around the eyes and ears. Their skin secretes a natural, red-coloured sunscreen substance that is sometimes referred to as "blood sweat" but is neither blood nor sweat. This secretion is initially colourless and turns red-orange within minutes, eventually becoming brown. Two highly acidic pigments have been identified in the secretions; one red hipposudoric acid and one orange norhipposudoric acid, which inhibit the growth of disease-causing bacteria and their light-absorption profile peaks in the ultraviolet range, creating a sunscreen effect. Regardless of diet, all hippos secrete these pigments so food does not appear to be their source; rather, they may be synthesised from precursors such as the amino acid tyrosine. This natural sunscreen cannot prevent the animal's skin from cracking if it stays out of water too long.

The testes of the males do not fully descend and a scrotum is not present. In addition, the penis retracts into the body when not erect. The genitals of the female hippos are unusual in that the vagina is ridged and the vulval vestibule has two large, protruding diverticula. Both of these have an unknown function.

A hippo's lifespan is typically 40 to 50 years. Donna the Hippo was one of the oldest living hippos in captivity. She lived at the Mesker Park Zoo in Evansville, Indiana, in the US until her death in 2012 at the age of 61. Two hippos share the record for the oldest hippo ever recorded at 65 years: Bertha, a female hippo who lived in the Manila Zoo in the Philippines since it first opened in 1959 until her death in July 2017, and Lu, a male hippo from the Ellie Schiller Homosassa Springs Wildlife State Park who was born at the San Diego Zoo on January 26th, 1960 and died at Homosassa in June 2025, also at the age of 65.

== Distribution and status ==
Approximate maximal prehistoric distribution of Hippopotamus amphibius during the Middle–Late Pleistocene

Hippopotamus amphibius arrived in Europe around 560–460,000 years ago, during the Middle Pleistocene. The distribution of Hippopotamus amphibius in Europe during the Pleistocene was largely confined to Southern Europe, including the Iberian Peninsula, Italy (southwards to Sicily), Greece, and probably Herzegovina, but extended into northwestern Europe, including northern France, Great Britain (as far north as Stockton-on-Tees), Belgium, the Netherlands, and western Germany during interglacial periods, such as the Last Interglacial (130–115,000 years ago). Analysis of ancient DNA indicates that Late Pleistocene European hippopotamuses are closely related to and nested within the genetic diversity of living African hippopotamuses. The youngest records of the species in Europe are from the Late Pleistocene of Greece, and the Rhine Graben of southwest Germany, dating to around 40–30,000 years ago.

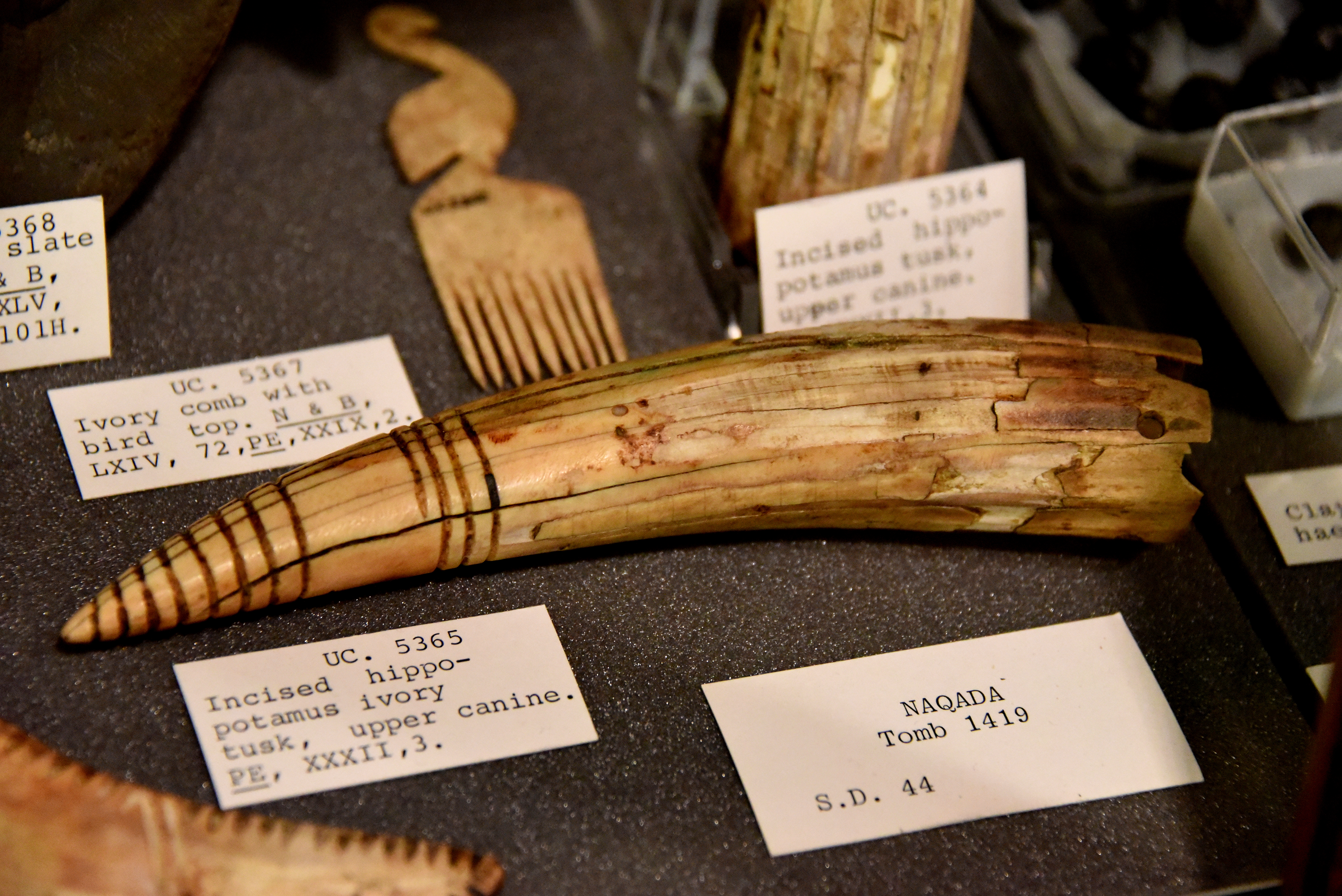
Incised hippopotamus ivory tusk (upper canine) with four holes around top (Naqada Tomb 1419, Egypt; Naqada period)

Fossil evidence suggests that during wet periods of the Middle-Late Pleistocene, H. amphibius was widespread across the Arabian Peninsula, with remains known from the Nafud desert in northern Saudi Arabia ‘Uruq Aljelibah in southwest Saudi Arabia, and probable remains from the Rub' al Khali desert in southern Saudi Arabia. Remains are also known from Shanidar Cave in northern Iraq, suggested to be Late Pleistocene in age. Archaeological evidence exists of its presence in the Levant, dating to less than 3,000 years ago. H. amphibius was also formerly present in the Maghreb in northern Algeria and Morocco during the Middle-Late Pleistocene, with H. amphibius remains in the region historically assigned to the species "H. icosiensis". In the African Humid Period during the early Holocene, around 10-4,000 years ago, the range of hippopotamuses extended across the Sahara (which at that time formed an extensive savannah crossed with rivers and lakes, leading it to be dubbed the "Green Sahara"), as indicated by finds of hippopotamus remains and rock art depicting them. For much of the historical period, the hippopotamus was present in the Egyptian part of the Nile from the Sudan border to the Nile Delta, but their distribution appears to have fragmented from the Ptolemaic and Roman periods onwards, especially during the early modern period, due to persecution by humans, with hippos having becoming rare in the Egyptian Nile by 1600, by which time they were only found in the eastern delta near Damietta and the southern Nubian part of the Egyptian Nile near the Sudan border, where some records suggest they persisted into the early 19th century (though at least some of these animals may have been swept in from Sudan). Hippos are still found in the rivers and lakes of the northern Democratic Republic of the Congo, Uganda, Tanzania, and Kenya, north through to Ethiopia, Somalia, and Sudan, west to The Gambia, and south to South Africa.

Genetic evidence suggests common hippos in Africa experienced a marked population expansion during or after the Pleistocene, attributed to an increase in water bodies at the end of the era. These findings have important conservation implications, as hippo populations across the continent are currently threatened by loss of access to fresh water. Hippos are also subject to unregulated hunting and poaching. The species is included in Appendix II of the Convention on International Trade in Endangered Species (CITES) meaning international export/import (including in parts and derivatives) requires CITES documentation to be obtained and presented to border authorities.

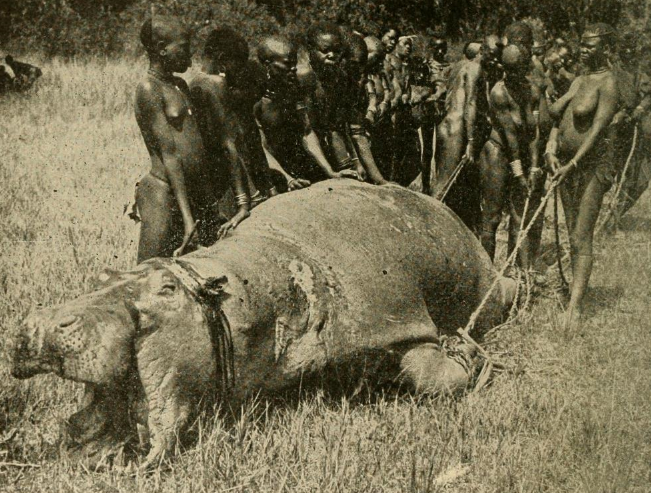
Ugandan tribespeople with hippo slain for food (early 20th century)

As of 2017, the IUCN Red List drawn up by the International Union for Conservation of Nature (IUCN) lists the species as vulnerable, with a stable population estimated between 115,000 and 130,000 animals. The hippo population has declined most dramatically in the Democratic Republic of the Congo. By 2005, the population in Virunga National Park had dropped to 800 or 900 from around 29,000 in the mid-1970s. This decline is attributed to the disruptions caused by the Second Congo War. The poachers are believed to be Mai-Mai rebels, underpaid Congolese soldiers, and local militia groups. Reasons for poaching include the belief hippos are harmful to society, as well as financial gain. As of 2016, the Virunga hippo population appears to have increased again, possibly due to better protection from park rangers, who have worked with local fishermen. The sale of hippo meat is illegal, but black-market sales are difficult for Virunga National Park officers to track. Hippo meat is highly valued in some areas of central Africa and the teeth may be used as a replacement for elephant ivory.

A population of hippos exists in Colombia, descended from captive individuals that escaped from Pablo Escobar's estate after his death in 1993. Their numbers grew to 100 by the 2020s and ecologists believe the population should be eradicated, as they are breeding rapidly and are an increasing menace to humans and the environment. Attempts to control them include sterilisation and culling.

== Behaviour and ecology ==
Video of hippos in the wild

Hippos are semiaquatic and require enough water to immerse in, while being close to grass. They mostly live in freshwater habitat, but can be found in estuaries. They prefer relatively still waters with gently sloping shores, though male hippos may also be found in very small numbers in more rapid waters with rocky slopes. Like most herbivores, hippos will consume a variety of plants if presented with them in captivity, but their diet in nature consists almost entirely of grass, with only minimal consumption of aquatic plants. Hippos spend most of the day in water to stay cool and hydrated. Just before night begins, they leave the water to forage on land. A hippo will travel 3–5 km (1.9–3.1 mi) per night, eating around 40 kg (88 lb) of grass. By dawn, they are back in the water.

Despite being semiaquatic, it is debated whether hippos can swim at all. They move in the water by walking or bouncing off the bottom, rarely entering deep water. An adult hippo needs to surface at least every six minutes, while young need to breathe every two to three minutes. Hippos move on land by trotting, and limb movements do not change between speeds. They can reach an airborne stage (a stage when all limb are off the ground) when they move fast enough. Hippos are reported to reach 30 km/h (19 mph) but this has not been confirmed. They are incapable of jumping but can walk up steep banks. The hippopotamus sleeps with both hemispheres of the brain resting, as in all land mammals, and usually sleeps on land or in water with the nostrils exposed. Despite this, it can sleep while submerged, intermittently surfacing to breathe seemingly without waking. They appear to transition between different phases of sleep more quickly than other mammals.

Because of their size and their habit of taking the same paths to feed, hippos can have a significant impact on the land across which they walk, keeping the land clear of vegetation and depressing the ground. Over prolonged periods, hippos can divert the paths of swamps and channels. By defecating in the water, the animals also appear to pass on microbes from their gut, affecting the biogeochemical cycle. On occasion, hippos have been filmed eating carrion, usually near the water. There are other reports of meat-eating and even cannibalism and predation. Hippos' stomach anatomy lacks adaptions to carnivory, and meat-eating is likely caused by lack of nutrients or represents an abnormal behaviour.

=== Social life ===
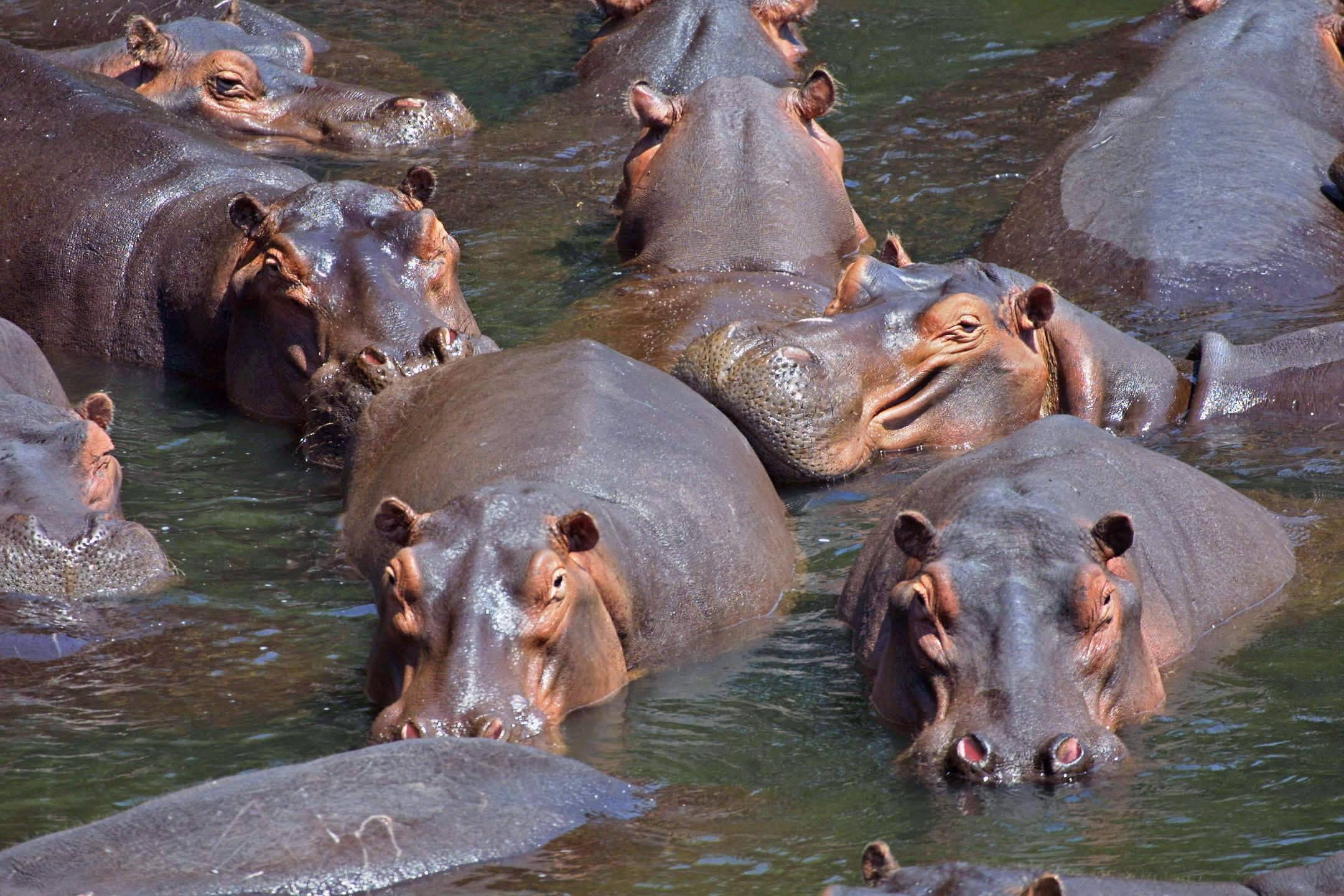
Hippopotamus pod

It is challenging to study the interaction of bulls and cows because hippos are not sexually dimorphic, so cows and young bulls are almost indistinguishable in the field. Hippo pods fluctuate but can contain over 100 hippos. Although they lie close together, adults develop almost no social bonds. Males establish territories in water but not land, and these may range 250–500 m (820–1,640 ft) in lakes and 50–100 m (160–330 ft) in rivers. Territories are abandoned when the water dries up. The bull has breeding access to all the cows in his territory. Younger bachelors are allowed to stay as long as they defer to him. A younger male may challenge the old bull for control of the territory. Within the pods, the hippos tend to segregate by sex and status. Bachelor males lounge near other bachelors, females with other females, and the territorial male is on his own. When hippos emerge from the water to graze, they do so individually.

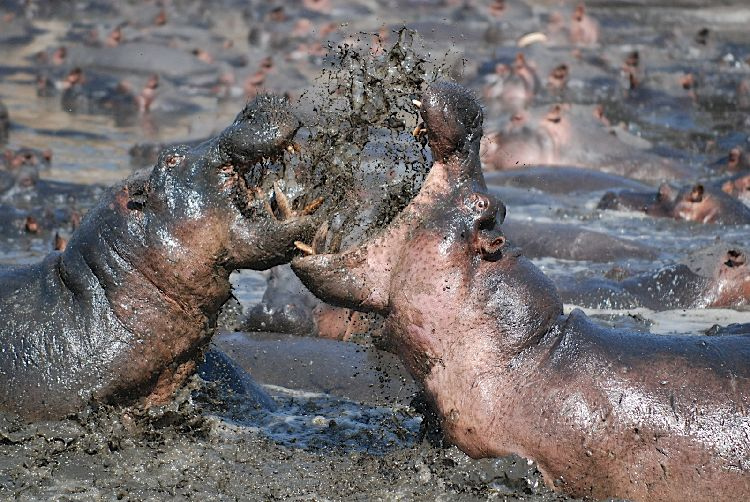
Male hippos fighting

Hippos engage in "muck-spreading" which involves defecating while spinning their tails to distribute the faeces over a greater area. Muck-spreading occurs both on land and in water and its function is not well understood. It is unlikely to serve a territorial function, as the animals only establish territories in the water. They may be used as trails between the water and grazing areas. "Yawning" serves as a threat display. When fighting, bulls use their incisors to block each other's attacks and their large canines as offensive weapons. When hippos become over-populated or a habitat shrinks, bulls sometimes attempt infanticide, but this behaviour is not common under normal conditions.

The most common hippo vocalisation is the "wheeze honk", which can travel over long distances in air. This call starts as a high-pitched squeal followed by a deeper, resonant call. The animals can recognise the calls of other individuals. Hippos are more likely to react to the wheeze honks of strangers than to those they are more familiar with (dear enemy effect). When threatened or alarmed, they produce exhalations, and fighting bulls will bellow loudly. Hippos are recorded to produce clicks underwater which may have echolocative properties. They have the unique ability to hold their heads partially above the water and send out a cry that travels through both water and air; individuals respond both above and below water.

=== Reproduction ===
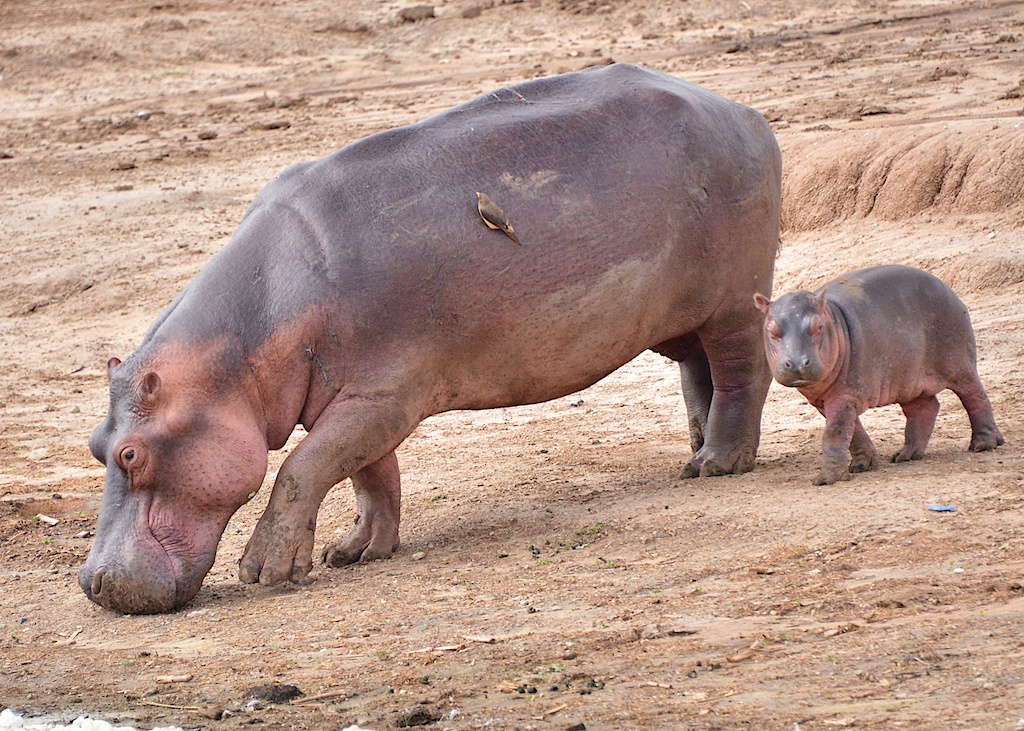
Cow and calf

Cows reach sexual maturity at five to six years of age and have a gestation period of eight months. A study of endocrine systems revealed cows may begin puberty at as early as three or four years. Bulls reach maturity at around 7.5 years. Both conceptions and births are highest during the wet season. Male hippos always have mobile spermatozoa and can breed year-round. After becoming pregnant, a female hippo will typically not begin ovulation again for 17 months. Hippos mate in the water, with the cow remaining under the surface, her head emerging periodically to draw breath. Cows give birth in seclusion and return within 10 to 14 days. Calves are born on land or shallow water weighing on average 50 kg (110 lb) and at an average length of around 127 cm (50 in). The female lies on her side when nursing, which can occur underwater or on land. The young are carried on their mothers' backs in deep water.

Mother hippos are very protective of their young, not allowing others to get too close. One cow was recorded protecting a calf's carcass after it had died. Calves may be temporarily kept in nurseries, guarded by one or more adults, and will play amongst themselves. Like many other large mammals, hippos are described as K-strategists, in this case typically producing just one large, well-developed infant every couple of years (rather than many small, poorly developed young several times per year, as is common among small mammals such as rodents). Calves no longer need to suckle when they are a year old.

=== Interspecies interactions ===
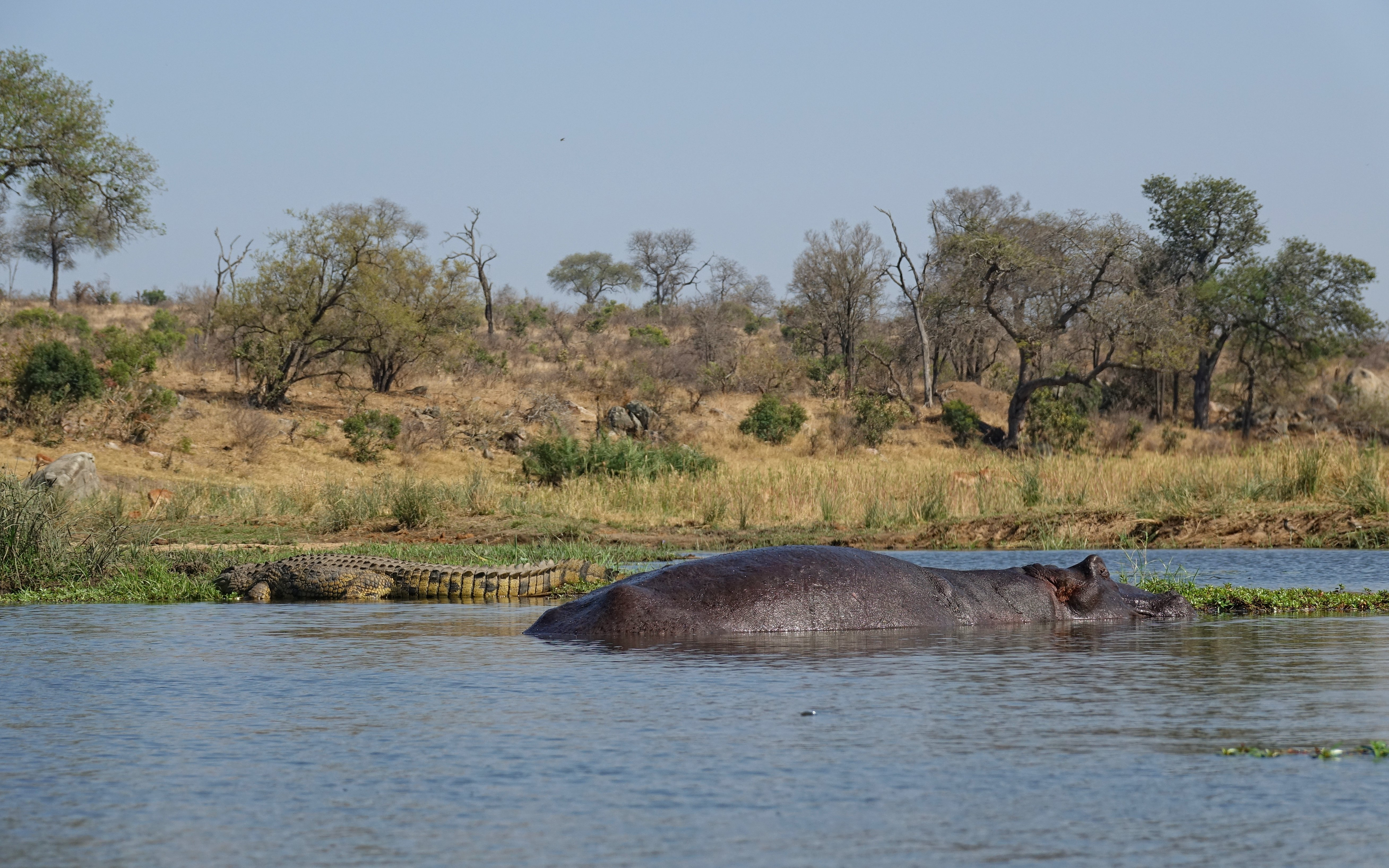
A hippopotamus and Nile crocodile side by side in Kruger National Park

Hippos coexist alongside a variety of large predators in their habitats. Nile crocodiles, lions, and spotted hyenas are known to prey on young hippos. Beyond these, adult hippos are not usually preyed upon by other animals due to their aggression and size. Cases where large lion prides have successfully preyed on adult hippos have been reported, but it is generally rare. Lions occasionally prey on adults at Gorongosa National Park and calves are sometimes taken at Virunga. Crocodiles are frequent targets of hippo aggression, probably because they often inhabit the same riparian habitats; crocodiles may be either aggressively displaced or killed by hippos, although they will avoid crocodiles larger than 3.5 m (11 ft). In turn, very large Nile crocodiles have been observed preying occasionally on calves, "half-grown" hippos, and possibly also adult female hippos. Groups of crocodiles have also been observed finishing off still-living male hippos that were previously injured in mating battles with other males.

Hippos occasionally visit cleaning stations in order to be cleaned of parasites by certain species of fishes. They signal their readiness for this service by opening their mouths wide. This is an example of mutualism, in which the hippo benefits from the cleaning while the fish receive food. Hippo defecation creates allochthonous deposits of organic matter along the river beds. These deposits have an unclear ecological function. A 2015 study concluded hippo dung provides nutrients from terrestrial material for fish and aquatic invertebrates, while a 2018 study found that their dung can be toxic to aquatic life in large quantities, due to absorption of dissolved oxygen in water bodies.

The parasitic monogenean flatworm Oculotrema hippopotami infests hippopotamus eyes, mainly the nictitating membrane. It is the only monogenean species (which normally live on fish) documented to live on a mammal.

== Relationship with humans ==
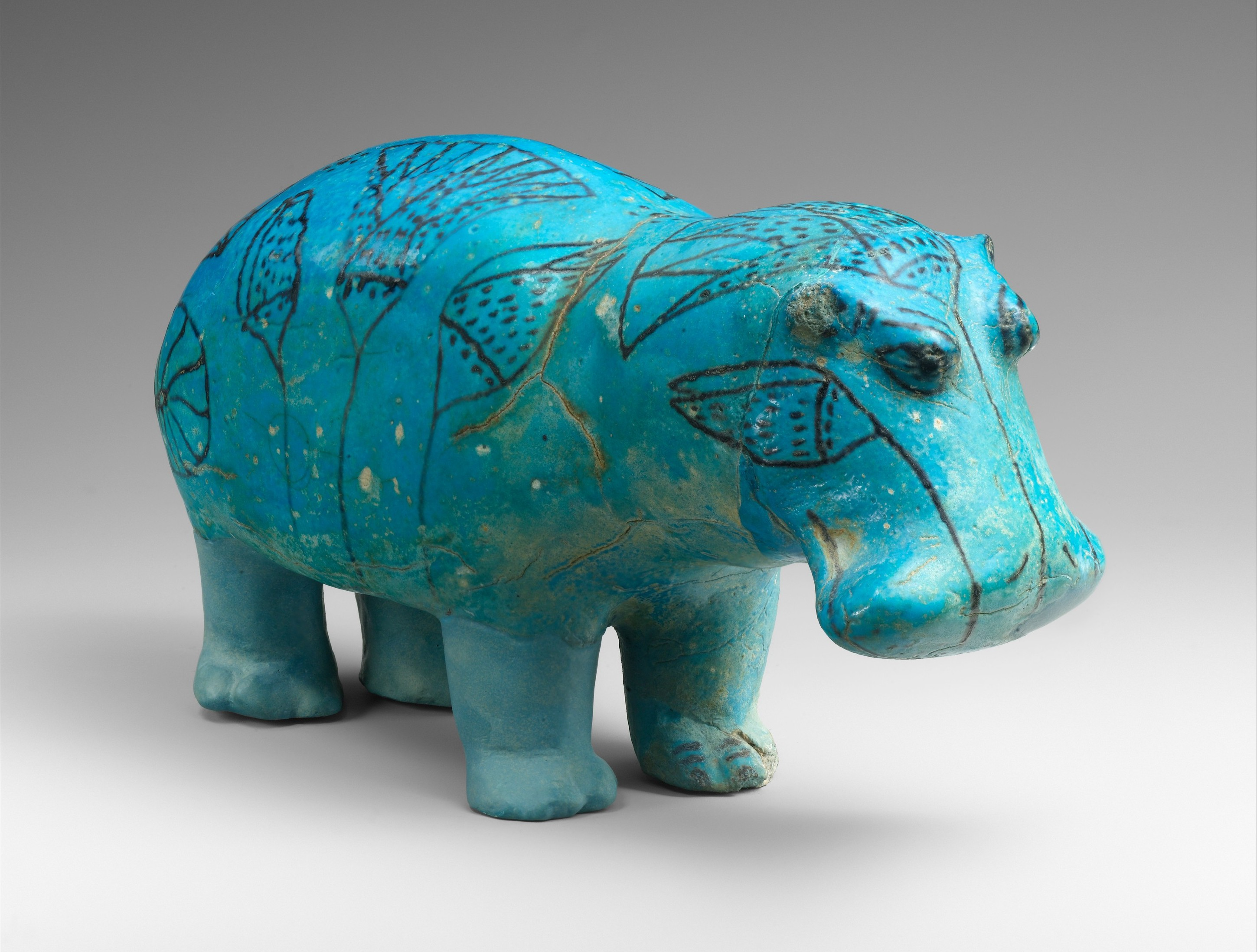
Hippopotamus ("William"), Middle Kingdom of Egypt, c. 1961–1878 BC

Cut marks on bones of H. amphibius found at Bolomor Cave, a site in Spain preserving fossils dating from 230,000 to 120,000 years ago, provides evidence for Neanderthal butchery of hippopotamuses. The earliest evidence of modern human interaction with hippos comes from butchery cut marks on hippo bones found at the Bouri Formation and dated to around 160,000 years ago. 4,000–5,000 year old art showing hippos being hunted have been found in the Tassili n'Ajjer Mountains of the central Sahara near Djanet. The ancient Egyptians recognised the hippo as ferocious, and representations on the tombs of nobles show humans hunting them.

The hippo was also known to the Greeks and Romans. The Greek historian Herodotus described the hippo in The Histories (written circa 440 BC) and the Roman naturalist Pliny the Elder wrote about the hippo in his encyclopedia Naturalis Historia (written circa 77 AD). The Yoruba people called the hippo erinmi, which means "elephant of the water". Some individual hippos have achieved international fame. Huberta became a celebrity during the Great Depression for trekking a great distance across South Africa.

=== Attacks on humans ===
The hippo is considered to be extremely aggressive and has frequently been reported charging and attacking boats. Hippos can easily capsize small boats and injure or kill passengers. A case in 2014 within Niger happened where a boat was capsized by a hippo and 13 people were killed. Hippos will often raid farm crops if the opportunity arises, and humans may come into conflict with them on these occasions. These encounters can be fatal to either humans or hippos.

According to the Ptolemaic historian Manetho, the pharaoh Menes was carried off and then killed by a hippopotamus.

=== In zoos ===
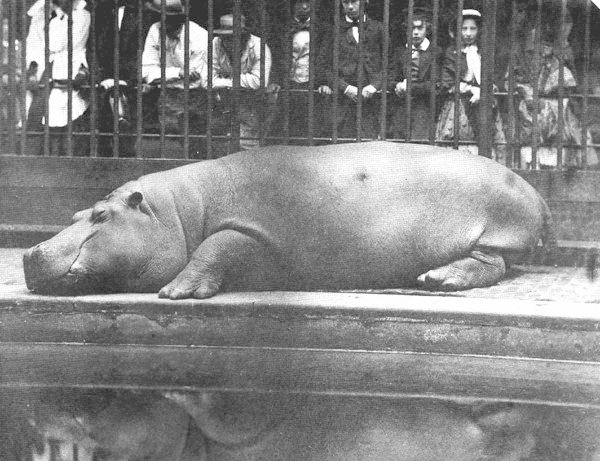
Obaysch lounging at the London Zoo in 1852

Hippos have long been popular zoo animals. The first record of hippos taken into captivity for display is dated to 3500 BC in Hierakonpolis, Egypt. The first zoo hippo in modern history was Obaysch, who arrived at the London Zoo on 25 May 1850, where he attracted up to 10,000 visitors a day and inspired a popular song, the "Hippopotamus Polka".

Hippos generally breed well in captivity; birth rates are lower than in the wild, but this can be attributed to zoos' desire to limit births, since hippos are relatively expensive to maintain. Starting in 2015, the Cincinnati Zoo built a US$73 million exhibit to house three adult hippos, featuring a 250,000 L (55,000 imp gal; 66,000 US gal) tank. Modern hippo enclosures also have a complex filtration system for waste, an underwater viewing area for the visitors, and glass that may be up to 9 cm (3.5 in) thick and capable of holding water under pressures of 31 kPa (4.5 psi).

=== Cultural significance ===
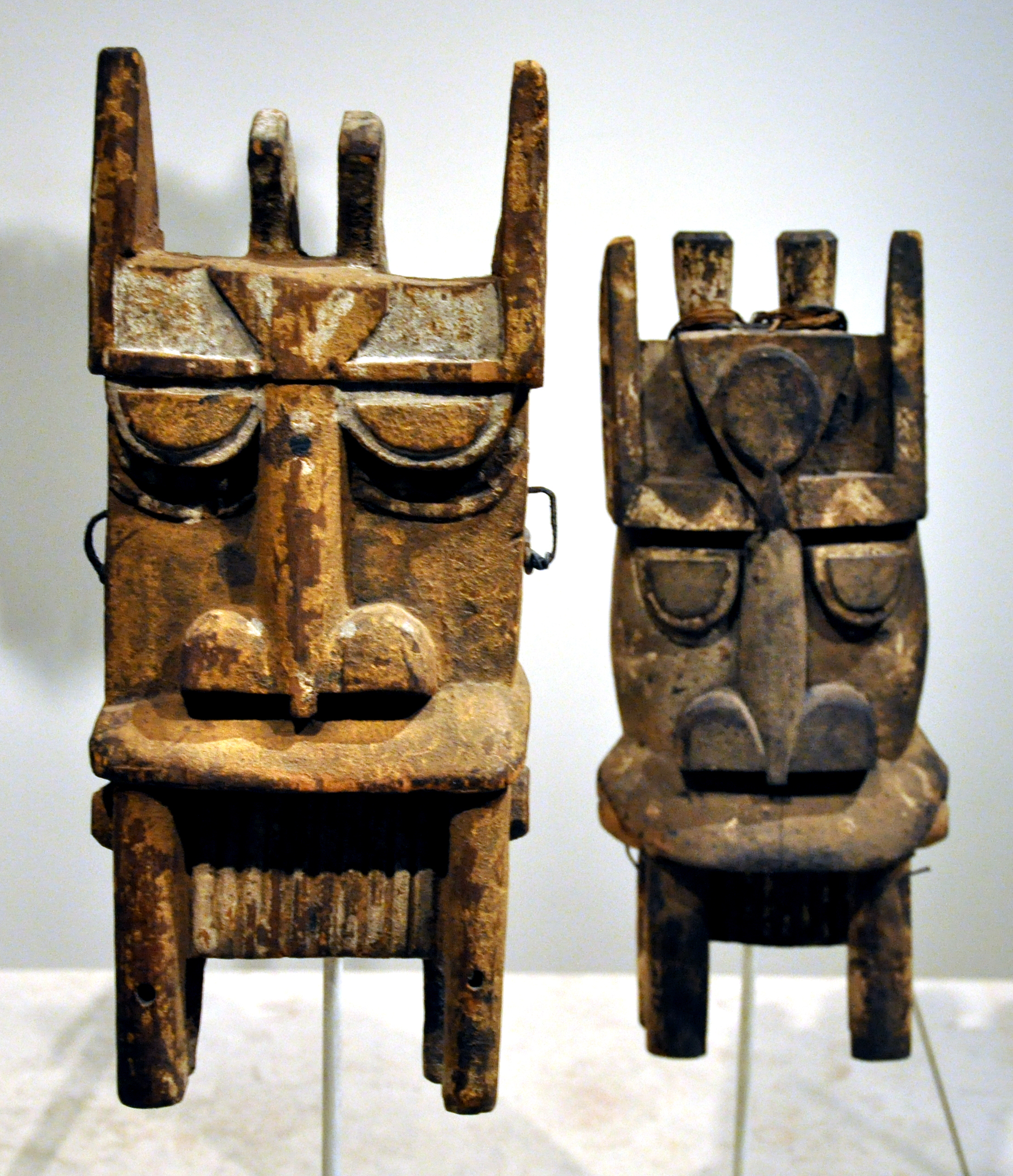
Ijaw hippopotamus masks

In Egyptian mythology, the god Set takes the form of a red hippopotamus and fights Horus for control of the land, but is defeated. The goddess Tawaret is depicted as a pregnant woman with a hippo head, representing fierce maternal love. The Ijaw people of the Niger Delta wore masks of aquatic animals like the hippo when practising their water spirit cults, and hippo ivory was used in the divination rituals of the Yoruba. Hippo masks were also used in Nyau funerary rituals of the Chewa of Southern Africa. According to Robert Baden-Powell, Zulu warriors referred to hippos in war chants. The Behemoth from the Book of Job, 40:15–24 is thought to be based on the hippo.

Hippos have been the subjects of various African folktales. According to a San story, when the Creator assigned each animal its place in nature, the hippos wanted to live in the water, but were refused out of fear they might eat all the fish. After begging and pleading, the hippos were finally allowed to live in the water on the condition they would eat grass instead of fish, and fling their dung so it can be inspected for fish bones. In a Ndebele tale, the hippo originally had long, beautiful hair, but it was set on fire by a jealous hare and the hippo had to jump into a nearby pool. The hippo lost most of his hair and was too embarrassed to leave the water.

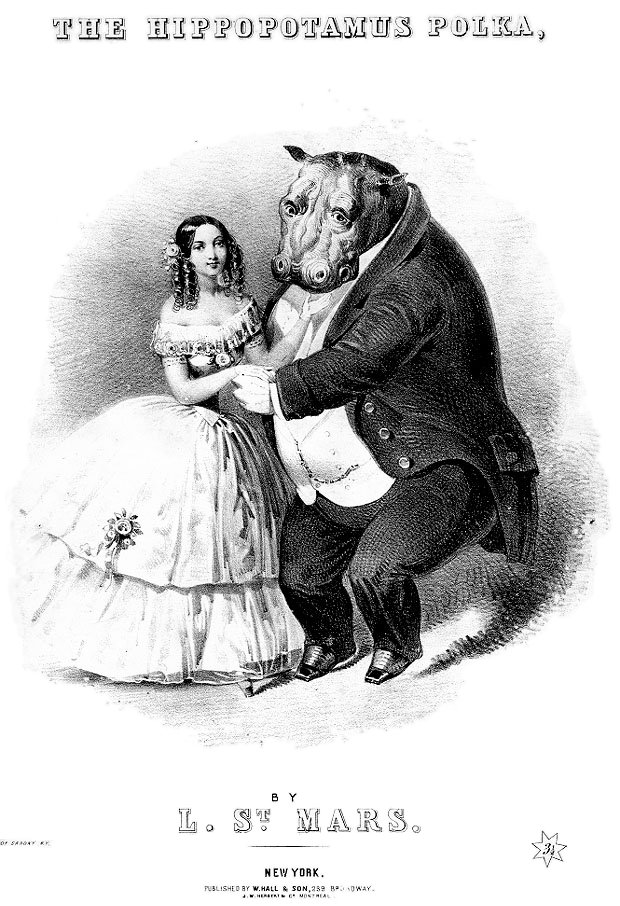
The "Hippopotamus Polka"

Hippopotamuses were rarely depicted in European art during the Renaissance and Baroque periods, due to less access to specimens by Europeans. One notable exception is Peter Paul Rubens' The Hippopotamus and Crocodile Hunt (1615–1616). Ever since Obaysch inspired the "Hippopotamus Polka", hippos have been popular animals in Western culture for their rotund appearance, which many consider comical. The Disney film Fantasia featured a ballerina hippo dancing to the opera La Gioconda. The film Hugo the Hippo is set in Tanzania and involves the title character trying to escape being slaughtered with the help of local children. The Madagascar films feature a hippo named Gloria. Hippos even inspired a popular board game, Hungry Hungry Hippos.

Among the most famous poems about the hippo is "The Hippopotamus" by T. S. Eliot, where he uses a hippo to represent the Catholic Church. Hippos are mentioned in the novelty Christmas song "I Want a Hippopotamus for Christmas" that became a hit for child star Gayla Peevey in 1953. They also featured in the popular "The Hippopotamous Song" by Flanders and Swann.

== See also ==
- American Hippo bill – 1910 bill that proposed the introduction of hippos into Louisiana
- List of individual hippos
- Hippo eats dwarf – hoax news article
