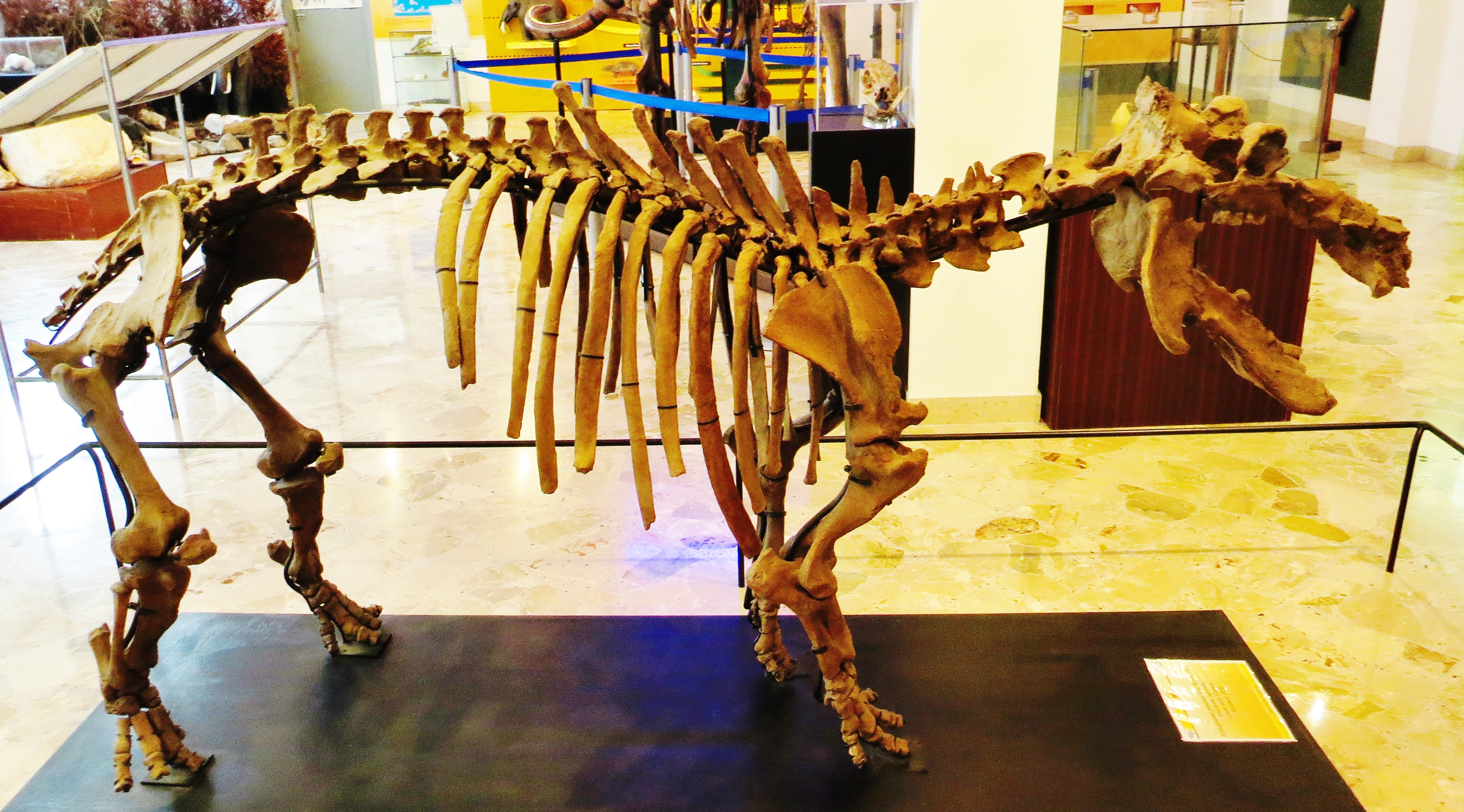
- Skeleton

Scientific classification
- Kingdom: Animalia
- Phylum: Chordata
- Class: Mammalia
- Infraclass: Placentalia
- Order: Artiodactyla
- Family: Hippopotamidae
- Genus: Hippopotamus
- Species: †H. pentlandi

Binomial name
- †Hippopotamus pentlandi Von Meyer, 1832

= Hippopotamus pentlandi =

Hippopotamus pentlandi Temporal range: late Middle to Late Pleistocene

Extinct species of mammal

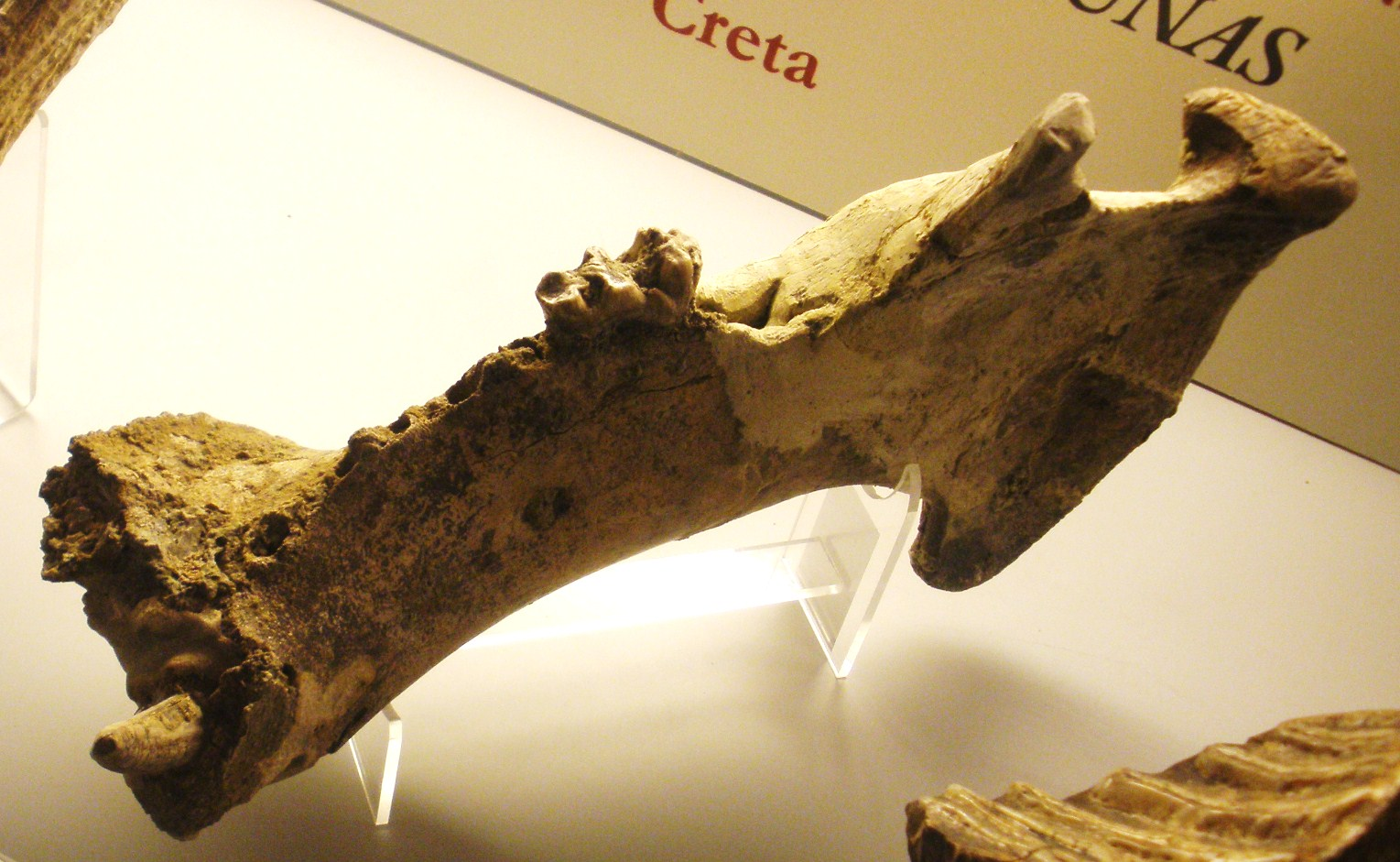
Jaw

Hippopotamus pentlandi is an extinct species of hippopotamus from Sicily, known from the late Middle Pleistocene to early Late Pleistocene. It is the largest of the insular dwarf hippos known from the Pleistocene of the Mediterranean, "at most 20% smaller than the mainland forms". It had an estimated body mass of approximately 1100 kg. It is suggested that it arrived in Sicily between 250,000 and 150,000 years ago, probably descending from the modern hippopotamus (Hippopotamus amphibius), with an origin from Hippopotamus antiquus being less likely. It is probably ancestral to Hippopotamus melitensis from Malta, which is substantially smaller than H. pentlandi. In comparison to H. amphibius and H. antiquus, the muzzle was shorter, the occipital and nasal regions were more developed, the mastoid process was enlarged, and the dental row was shortened, and the condyle of the mandible is low. In comparison to H. amphibius, the orbits are also elevated. It was present in Sicily until at least the latest Middle Pleistocene around 120 kya, and was probably extinct by the beginning of Marine Isotope Stage 4 (~71,000 years ago). Contemporaneous species include the dwarf elephant Palaeoloxodon mnaidriensis, the aurochs, red deer, steppe bison, fallow deer, wild boar, brown bear, wolves, red foxes, cave hyena and cave lions.

== Palaeobiology ==
=== Palaeoecology ===
Based on dental topographic and three-dimensional surface texture analysis, the diet of H. pentlandi was likely grazing dominated, similar to that of modern H. amphibius. Study of its dental microwear supports this view.

== See also ==
- Cyprus dwarf hippopotamus
- Cretan dwarf hippopotamus
