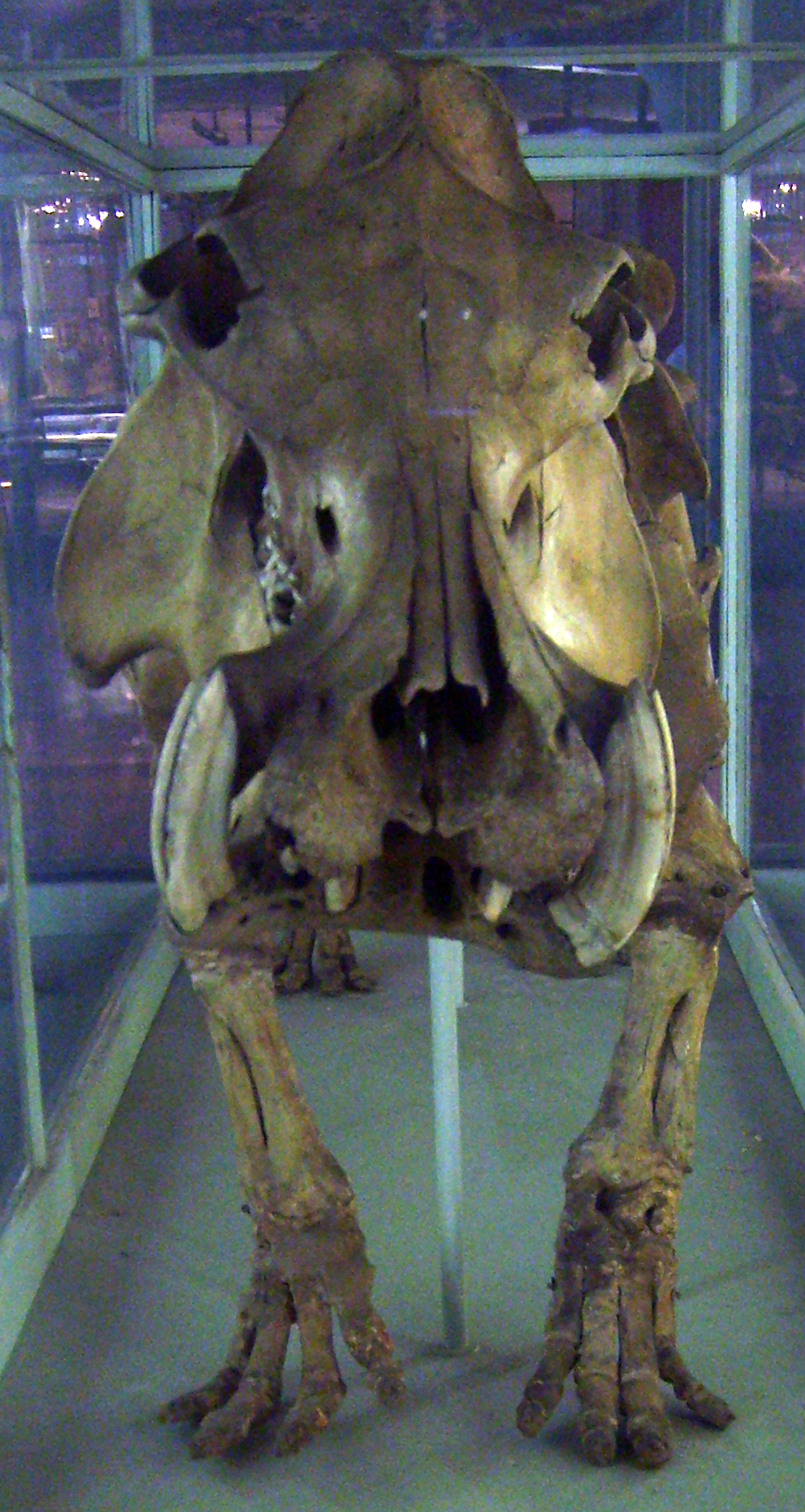
- Hippopotamus lemerlei skeleton at the Museum für Naturkunde, Berlin

Scientific classification
- Kingdom: Animalia
- Phylum: Chordata
- Class: Mammalia
- Infraclass: Placentalia
- Order: Artiodactyla
- Family: Hippopotamidae
- Subfamily: Hippopotaminae
- Genus: Hippopotamus

Species
- †Hippopotamus lemerlei; †Hippopotamus laloumena; †Hippopotamus madagascariensis

= Malagasy hippopotamus =

Extinct species of hippopotamus

Several species of Malagasy hippopotamus (also known as Malagasy pygmy hippopotamus or Madagascan pygmy hippopotamus) lived on the island of Madagascar but are now believed to be extinct. The animals were very similar to the extant hippopotamus and pygmy hippopotamus. The fossil record suggests that at least one species of hippopotamus lived until about 1,000 to 400 years ago (Note: A recently discovered Malagasy hippopotamus mandible was dated to c. 1600, extending the range by 600 years.) and other evidence suggests that the species may have survived until much more recently. The taxonomy of these animals is not resolved and not widely studied.

== Discovery and taxonomy ==
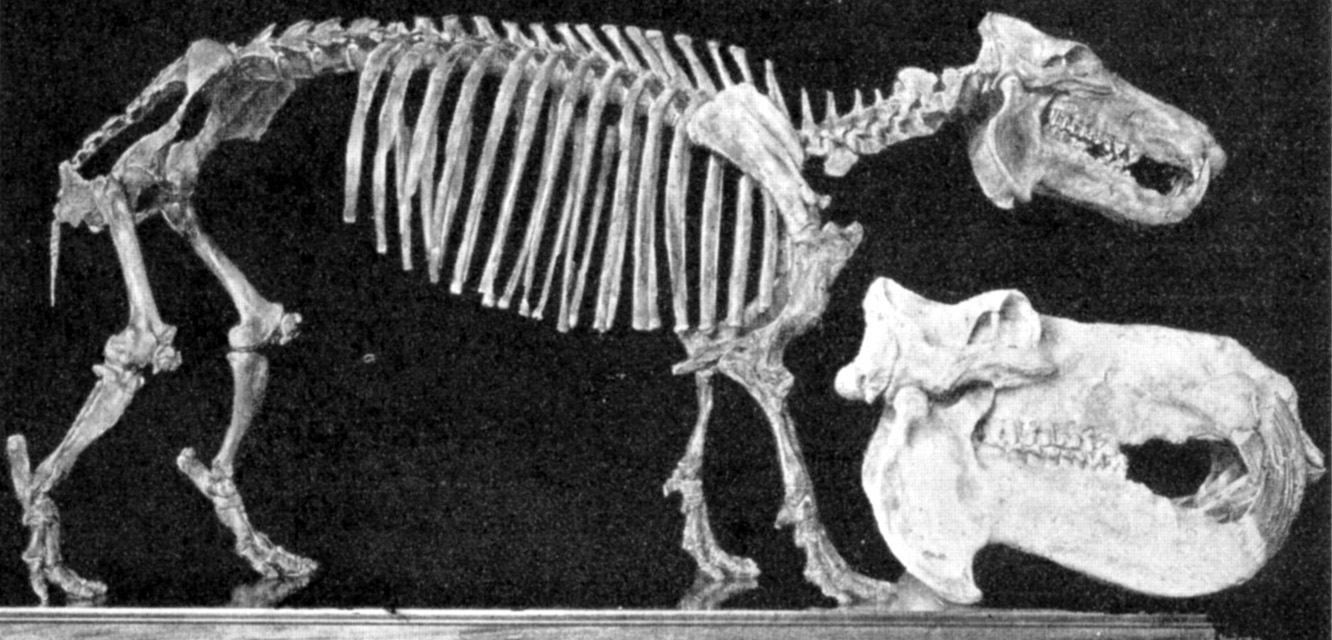
Choeropsis madagascariensis skeleton with a H. amphibius skull

The Malagasy hippopotamus was first described in the mid-19th century by Alfred Grandidier, who unearthed nearly 50 individual hippos from a dried-up swamp at 'Ambolisatra' (thought to be Ambolisaka, near Lake Ihotry), a few miles from the Mozambique Channel. As many as four different species of hippopotamus were subsequently identified by various researchers. In a careful revision of the fossil record of the Malagasy hippos, Solweig Stuenes concluded that there were only two species of hippopotamus which she classified as Hippopotamus lemerlei and Hippopotamus madagascariensis. In 1990, Faure and Guerin discovered a distinct third species of hippo, which they named Hippopotamus laloumena. In a review of Stuenes work, Harris suggested that Hip. madagascariensis had much in common with the extant pygmy hippopotamus of West Africa. Since the extant pygmy hippopotamus was placed in the genus Hexaprotodon, he used the name Hex. madagascariensis. Some taxonomists, however, consider the modern pygmy hippo to belong to the genus Choeropsis, so this species may also be classified as C. madagascariensis.

The fossil record of the Malagasy hippopotamus is extensive. At least seven hippopotamus bones show unequivocal signs of butchery, suggesting that they survived until humans arrived on Madagascar. The evidence of humans butchering the hippos also suggests their extinction may have been due to humans. Despite the discovery of many fossils, the hippos of Madagascar are not very well studied, perhaps because researchers are interested in some of the more exotic megafauna of Madagascar, such as the giant lemurs and the elephant birds.

== Species ==
Although not well-studied, there is growing acceptance of three species of Malagasy hippopotamus. It is not known when or exactly how these hippos arrived on the island of Madagascar. As hippos are semi-aquatic, it is possible that they survived the 400 km (248 mi) trek across the channel, although presumably when the water was shallower and there were perhaps small islands along the way. It is possible that the three species of hippopotamus represent three distinct and successful migrations to the island. Hippos are the only endemic ungulates ever to have lived on Madagascar.

=== Hippopotamus lemerlei ===
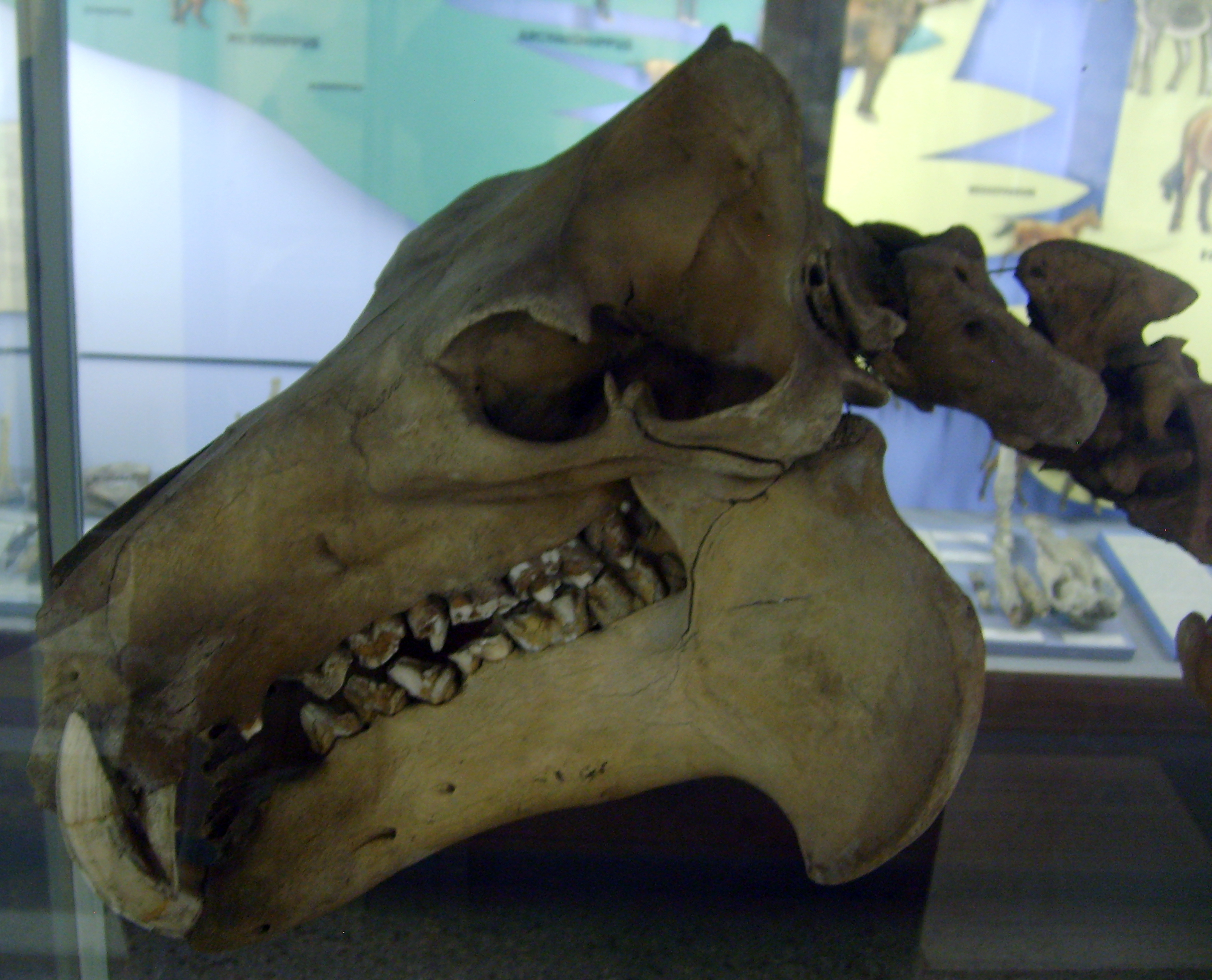
Hippopotamus lemerlei skull

Approximate size of an individual of Hippopotamus lemerlei compared to a human

Hippopotamus lemerlei bones have been mostly discovered in the rivers and lakes of western Madagascar, suggesting a riparian lifestyle, very similar to that of the modern hippopotamus of modern Africa. H. lemerlei also shared the high orbits that make it easier for the hippopotamus to see while in the water. The skull of H. lemerlei also resembled that of the modern hippopotamus, but with consistent size differences, indicating that H. lemerlei was a sexually dimorphic species.

Although a clear relative to the common hippopotamus, H. lemerlei was much smaller, roughly the size of the modern pygmy hippopotamus. The largest specimens were 6.5 ft (2 m) long and 2.5 ft (0.7 m) tall. The ancestors of H. lemerlei may have been full-sized hippos who shrunk through the process of insular dwarfism. A similar dwarfing process has occurred with hippos in many Mediterranean islands such as with the Cretan dwarf hippopotamus or the Cyprus dwarf hippopotamus.

Because H. lemerlei reached its size through dwarfing, it is properly known as the Malagasy dwarf hippopotamus, though this term is sometimes applied to the other species of Malagasy hippos. Bones of H. lemerlei have been dated to about 1,000 years ago (980±200 radiocarbon years before present).

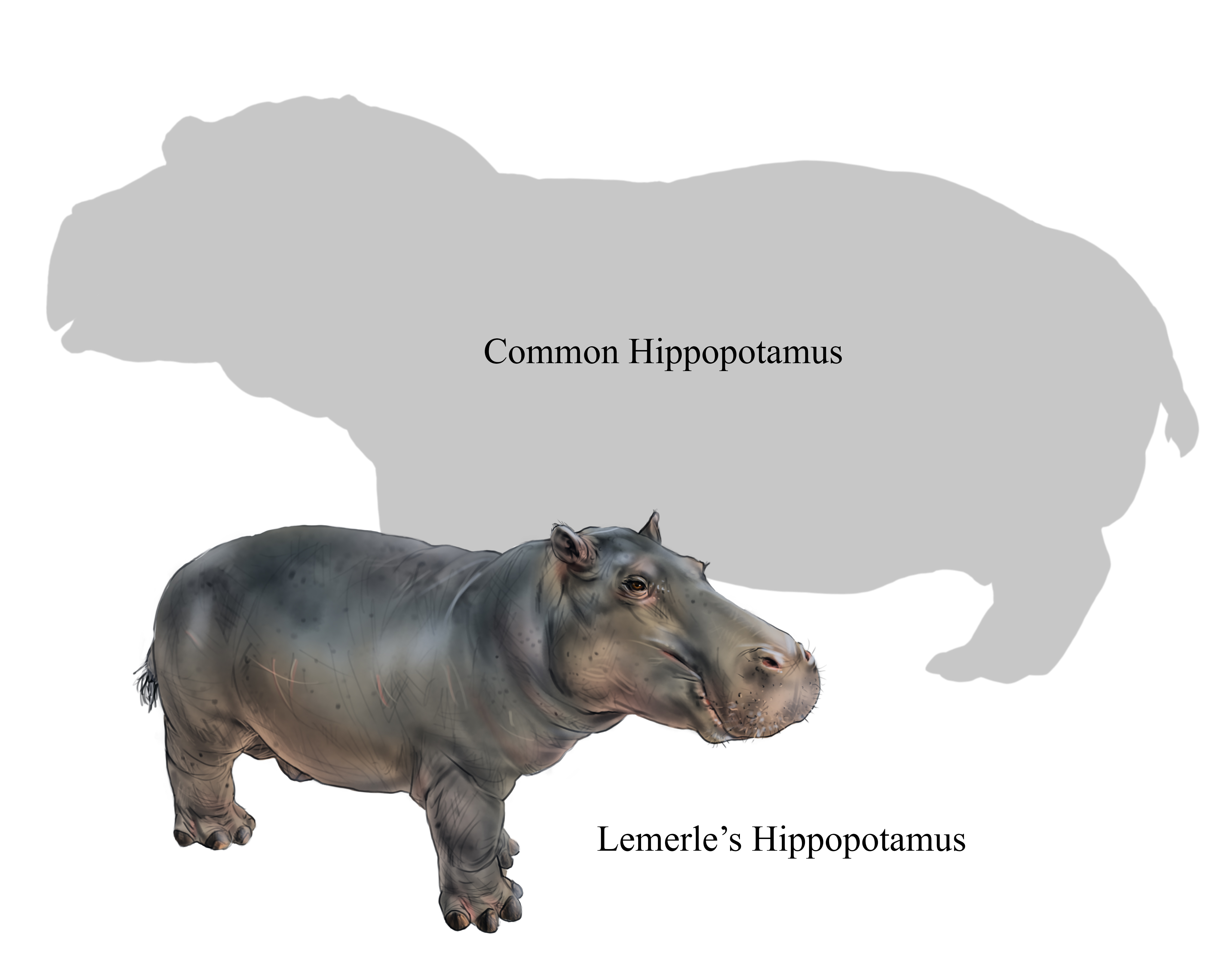
Speculative reconstruction of the Malagasy dwarf hippopotamus Hippopotamus lemerlei

=== Hippopotamus madagascariensis ===
Also called the Malagasy pygmy hippopotamus, this species was originally classified as Hippopotamus along with H. lemerlei, and indeed the two species were roughly the same size. A review of their morphology and habitat, however, suggested a closer relationship to the modern pygmy hippopotamus.

Like the modern pygmy hippopotamus, the Malagasy pygmy hippo had eyes on the side of its head rather than high orbits and teeth of the common hippopotamus. The Malagasy pygmy hippo was similarly less aquatic, with many of its fossils found in the forested highlands of Madagascar.

Fossils of both the Malagasy pygmy hippopotamus and H. lemerlei show a cursorial adaptation, distinct from the hippos on the African continent, and they would have been much better runners. This common trait is a possible indicator that both species of Malagasy hippo descended from a common ancestor, and that the similarities to the modern hippopotamus and pygmy hippopotamus are a case of parallel evolution.

The Malagasy pygmy hippopotamus is classified along with the modern Liberian pygmy hippopotamus, but researchers sometimes place the Liberian hippo in two different genera. The pygmy hippopotamus was originally classified as Choeropsis by Samuel G. Morton in 1849. In 1977, the pygmy hippopotamus was reclassified as a member of Hexaprotodon along with fossil species from Asia. Further examination, however, has discovered differences between the pygmy hippopotamus and the Asian hippos, prompting its reclassification by some as Choeropsis.

=== Hippopotamus laloumena ===
In 1990, Faure and Guerin described a third species of Malagasy hippopotamus, Hippopotamus laloumena ("laloumena" is a Malagasy word for hippopotamus), which was a distinct species. Little is known about the species, because it was identified with only a lower jaw and limb bones, recovered from a site near Mananjary on the east coast of Madagascar.

The fossils clearly belong to a hippopotamus, but one much larger than any previously described Madagascan species. From what is known, the species closely resembled the modern hippopotamus, but was somewhat smaller.

It is the oldest of Malagasy hippopotamus to range in the Pleistocene epoch.

== Diet ==
A study demonstrating Malagasy hippopotamuses and contemporary Aldabrachelys tortoises dietary habits indicates that H. lemerlei and tortoises were the dominant grazer guild in Madagascar. Malagasy hippos in general however were less grass-specialised than the mainland African hippo. However, other studies contradict these conclusions and suggest that grasses were only a minor component of the diets of Malagasy hippopotamuses.

== Oral legends and the kilopilopitsofy ==
Limited fossil evidence for the Madagascan hippopotamus is younger than 1,000 years old. However, the hippopotamus has been surprisingly common in the oral legends of the Malagasy. In 1648, Étienne de Flacourt became the French governor of Madagascar and he wrote in his Histoire de la grande isle de Madagascar about hearing stories from the Malagasy about an animal called the mangarsahoc which closely resembled the hippopotamus. In different regions of Madagascar, stories were recorded of the tsy-aomby-aomby, the omby-rano, and the laloumena, all animals that resembled hippopotamuses, but few other animals on the island. In 1902, a colonial administrator named Raybaud asserted that stories he heard in the highlands could only be about Malagasy hippos still living as late as 1878. The strength of these oral traditions led the IUCN to classify the Malagasy hippopotamuses as recent extinctions.

In the 1990s, Burney, who was studying recent extinctions in Madagascar, collected tales about a creature called the kilopilopitsofy that had been described by villagers in the town of Belo-sur-mer, a small fishing village on the west coast. Several villagers independently described an animal that, as recently as 1976, had entered their village, was the size of a cow, was dark pigmented, grunted a lot, and when threatened, fled underwater. No known animal on Madagascar fits the description but the animal seemed remarkably like a hippopotamus.

One man in the village could accurately mimic the sound of many animals, and when asked to imitate the kilopilopitsofy, he made noises very similar to that of a hippopotamus, even though he had never left the island and said he had never seen an African hippo. When shown photos, others also identified a hippopotamus-like animal, but with larger ears. Several described the creature's last appearance in 1976. In 2019, biologist Forrest Galante, on his show Extinct or Alive, found fossils and heard eyewitness accounts; The fossils were confirmed to be less than 200 years old and some eyewitness accounts were from less than 70 years ago.

Burney was reluctant to publish the study for fear of being labeled a cryptozoologist, but eventually published the results in American Anthropologist. Burney concluded that while the villagers had possibly encountered a Malagasy hippopotamus, it was also possible that the stories were inaccurate—a combination of misidentified animals, old folk traditions, and information the villagers had gathered from modern paleontology.
