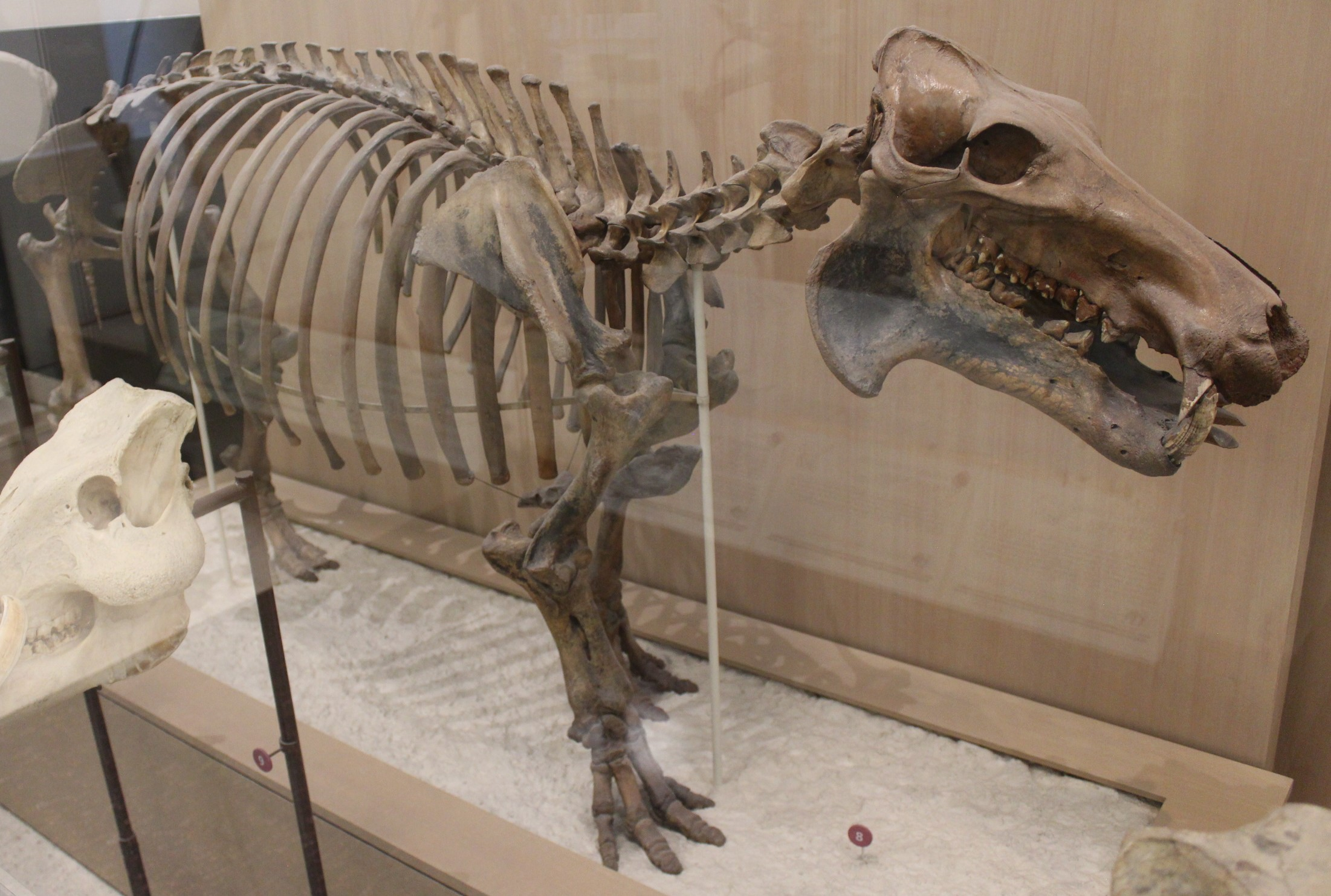
- H. lemerlei skeleton, American Museum of Natural History

Conservation status
- Extinct (IUCN 3.1)

Scientific classification
- Kingdom: Animalia
- Phylum: Chordata
- Class: Mammalia
- Infraclass: Placentalia
- Order: Artiodactyla
- Family: Hippopotamidae
- Genus: Hippopotamus
- Species: †H. lemerlei

Binomial name
- †Hippopotamus lemerlei Stuenes, 1989

= Hippopotamus lemerlei =

Hippopotamus lemerlei Temporal range: Holocene

Extinct species of mammal

Lemerle's dwarf hippopotamus (Hippopotamus lemerlei) is an extinct species of Malagasy hippopotamus.

== Taxonomy ==
Malagasy hippopotamuses were first discovered in the mid-19th century by Alfred Grandidier, who unearthed nearly 50 individual hippopotamuses from a dried-up swamp at Ambolisaka near Lake Ihotry, a few miles from the Mozambique Channel. In 1989, Scandinavian palaeontologist Solweig Stuenes described H. madagascariensis and H. lemerlei from these bones.

It may have descended from full-sized hippopotamuses who shrunk due to insular dwarfism, similar to many Mediterranean island hippos, such as with the Cretan dwarf hippopotamus or the Cyprus dwarf hippopotamus.

== Description ==
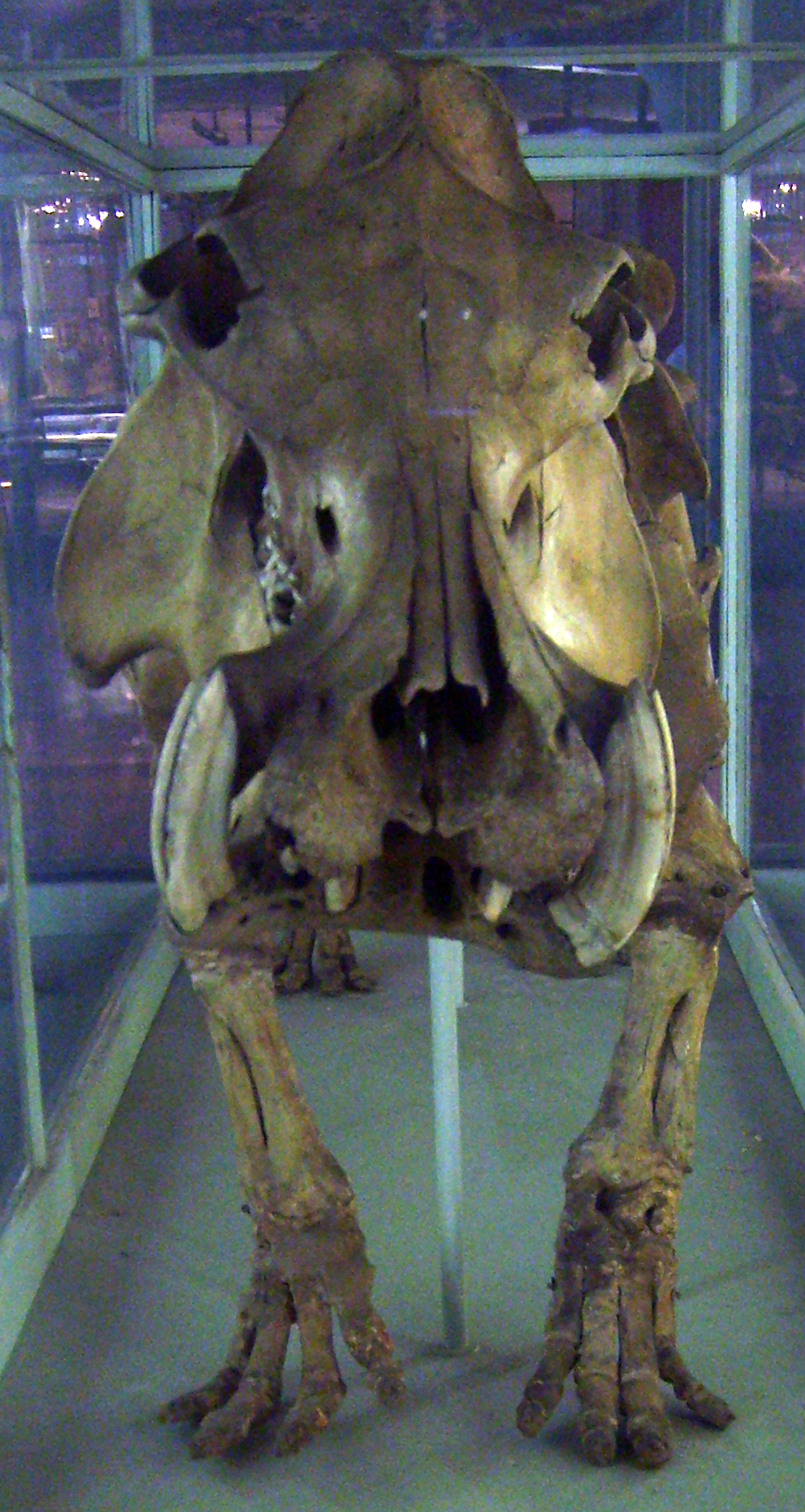
Skeleton at the Natural History Museum, Berlin

Size of H. lemerlei compared to a human

Hippopotamus lemerlei bones have been mostly discovered in the rivers and lakes (riparian environments) of western Madagascar, suggesting a habitat very similar to that of the modern hippopotamus of modern Africa. H. lemerlei also shared the high-placed eyes that make it easier to see while submerged.

Although a clear relative to the common hippopotamus, H. lemerlei was much smaller, roughly the size of the modern pygmy hippopotamus (Choeropsis liberiensis). The largest specimens were 2.0 m (6.5 ft) long and 2.5 ft (0.76 m) tall.

Bones of H. lemerlei have been dated to about 1,000 years ago (980±200 radiocarbon years before present.

== Paleoecology ==
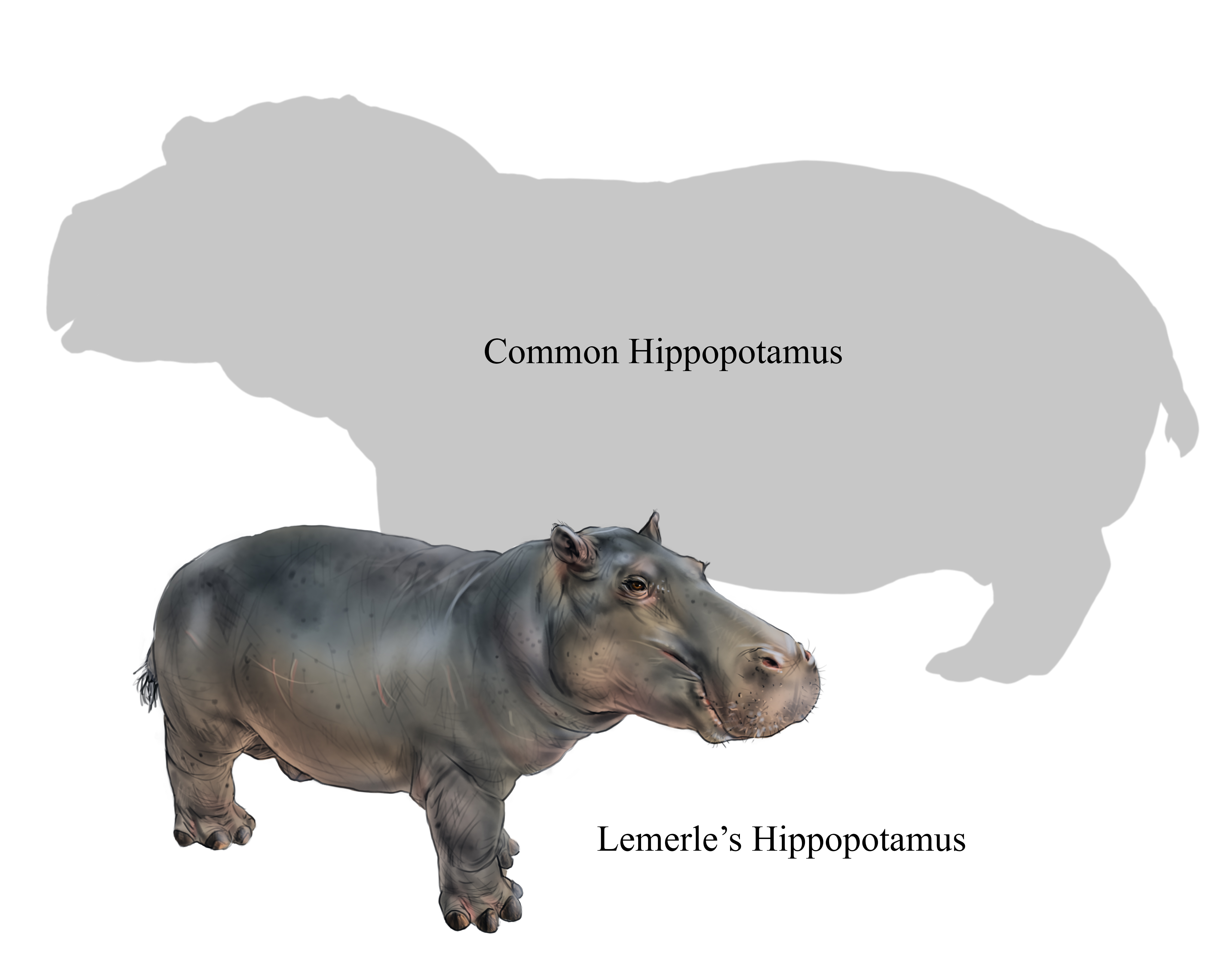
Reconstruction of H. lemerlei in front of a silhouette of the modern hippopotamus

=== Diet ===
Hippopotamus lemerlei and contemporary Aldabrachelys tortoises were the dominant grazers in Madagascar. Malagasy hippopotamuses in general, however, were less grass-specialised than the mainland African hippopotamus.

=== Extinction ===
Although there have been no remains dating to within the last thousand years, the hippopotamus has been surprisingly common in Malagasy oral legends. In different regions of Madagascar, stories were recorded of the mangarsahoc, the tsy-aomby-aomby, the omby-rano, and the laloumena, all animals that resembled hippopotamuses. The strength of these oral traditions led the International Union for Conservation of Nature (IUCN) to classify H. lemerlei as recently extinct (going extinct some time after the year 1500).

At least seven hippopotamus bones show unequivocal signs of butchery, suggesting that they survived until humans arrived on Madagascar, perhaps coexisting with humans for about 2,000 years. It is also possible that over-hunting by humans led to their extinction.

== See also ==
- Hippopotamus madagascariensis
- Hippopotamus laloumena
