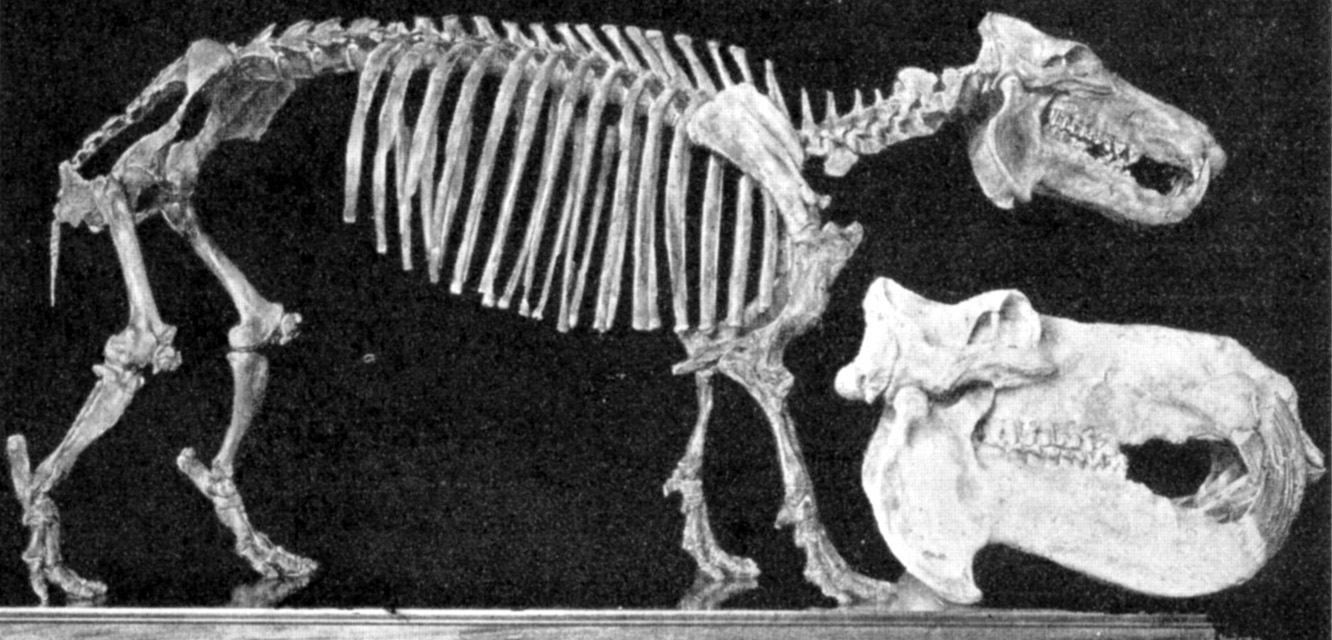
- Skeleton of H. madagascariensis next to a skull of the modern hippopotamus

Conservation status
- Extinct (IUCN 3.1)

Scientific classification
- Kingdom: Animalia
- Phylum: Chordata
- Class: Mammalia
- Infraclass: Placentalia
- Order: Artiodactyla
- Family: Hippopotamidae
- Genus: Hippopotamus
- Species: †H. madagascariensis

Binomial name
- †Hippopotamus madagascariensis Solweig Stuenes, 1989

= Hippopotamus madagascariensis =

Hippopotamus madagascariensis Temporal range: Late Holocene

Extinct species of mammal

Hippopotamus madagascariensis, the Madagascar or Madagascan dwarf hippopotamus, is an extinct species of hippopotamus, endemic to the island of Madagascar. Known only from bones, it is believed to have gone extinct sometime after 1500. It was one of three hippopotamus species, the Malagasy hippopotamuses, which were native to Madagascar and are all extinct.

== Taxonomy ==
Malagasy hippopotamuses were first discovered in the mid-19th century by Alfred Grandidier, who unearthed nearly 50 individual hippos from a dried-up swamp at Ambolisaka near Lake Ihotry, a few miles from the Mozambique Channel. In 1989, Scandinavian palaeontologist Solweig Stuenes described H. madagascariensis and H. lemerlei from these bones.

== Description ==
Like the modern pygmy hippopotamus (Choeropsis liberiensis), the Malagasy pygmy hippo had eyes on the side of its head rather than high orbits and teeth of the common hippopotamus. The Malagasy pygmy hippo was similarly less aquatic, with many of its fossils found in the forested highlands of Madagascar. These similarities may be due to convergent evolution.

Fossils of both the Malagasy pygmy hippopotamus and H. lemerlei show a cursorial adaptation, distinct from the hippos on the African continent, and they would have been much better runners.

== Extinction ==
Although there have been no remains dating to within the last thousand years, the hippopotamus has been surprisingly common in Malagasy oral legends. In different regions of Madagascar, stories were recorded of the mangarsahoc, the tsy-aomby-aomby, the omby-rano, and the laloumena, all animals that resembled hippopotamuses. The strength of these oral traditions led the International Union for Conservation of Nature (IUCN) to classify H. madagascarensis as recently extinct (going extinct some time after the year 1500).

At least seven hippopotamus bones show unequivocal signs of butchery, suggesting that they survived until humans arrived on Madagascar. Humans and hippos may have coexisted for about 2,000 years. It is possible overhunting by humans led to their extinction.

== See also ==
- Hippopotamus lemerlei
- Hippopotamus laloumena
