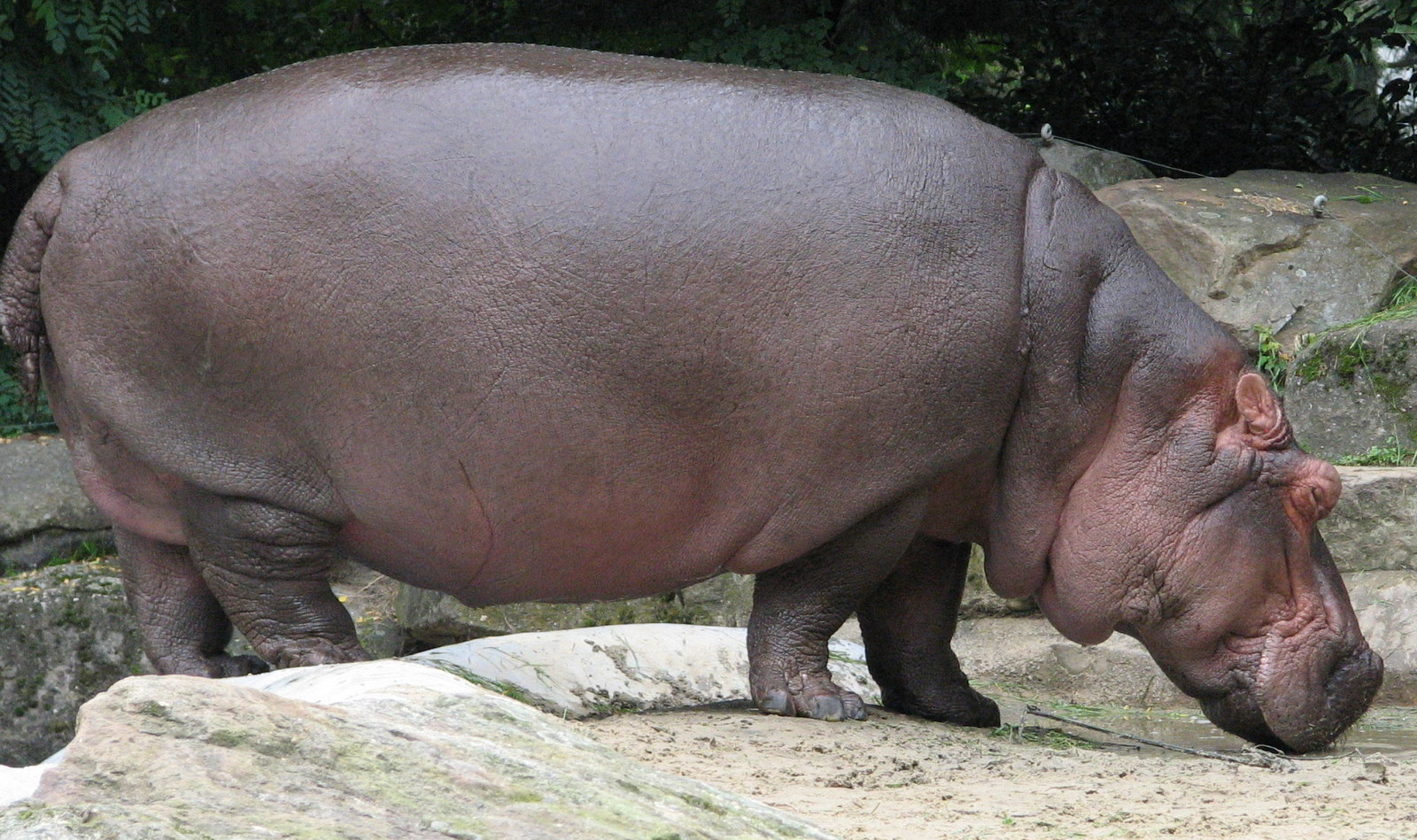
- The river hippopotamus, Hippopotamus amphibius
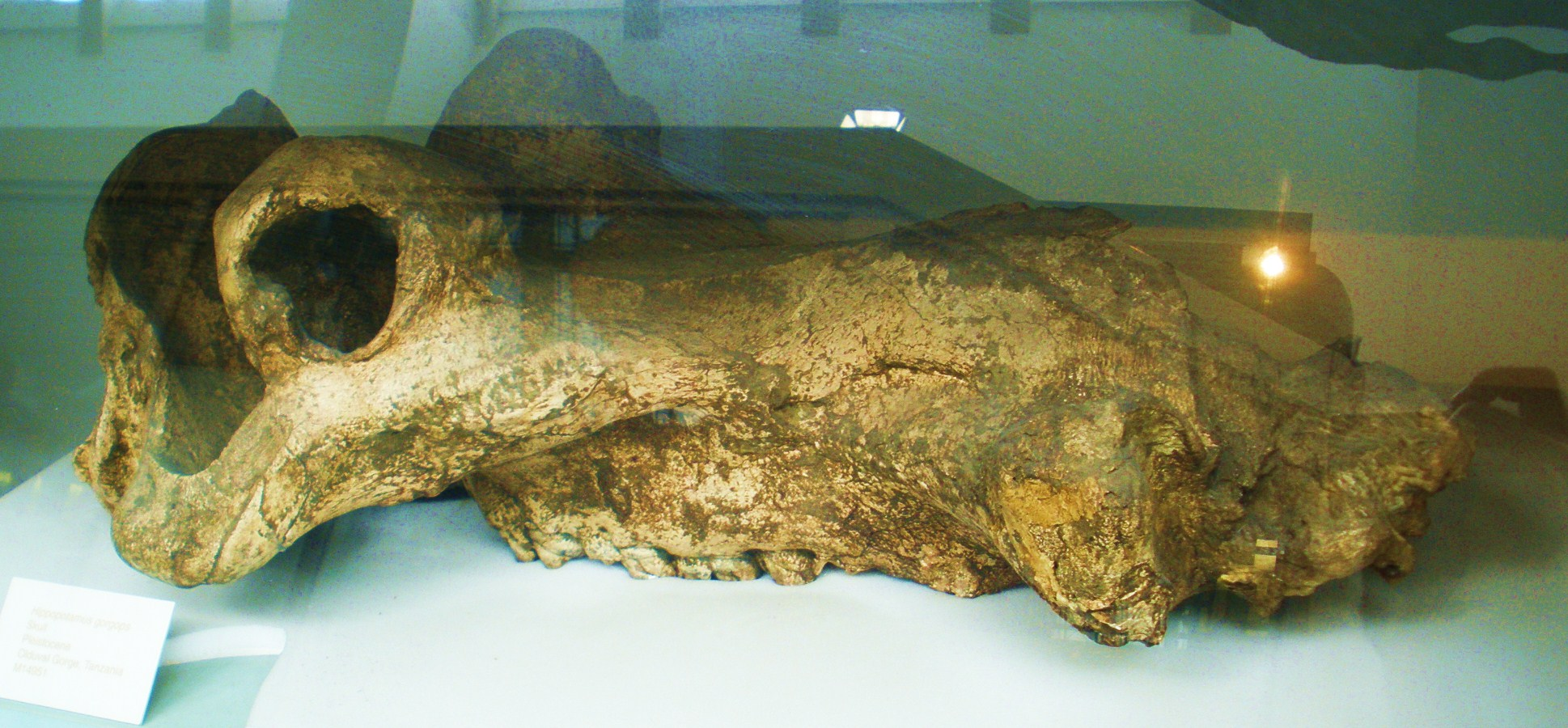
- Hippopotamus gorgops

Scientific classification
- Kingdom: Animalia
- Phylum: Chordata
- Class: Mammalia
- Order: Artiodactyla
- Family: Hippopotamidae
- Subfamily: Hippopotaminae
- Genus: Hippopotamus; Linnaeus, 1758

Type species
- Hippopotamus amphibius Linnaeus, 1758

Synonyms
- Phanourios Sondaar and Boekschoten, 1972

= Hippopotamus (genus) =

Hippopotamus Temporal range: Pliocene - Recent

Genus of mammals

Hippopotamus, meaning "river horse" in Ancient Greek, is a genus of artiodactyl mammals consisting of one extant species, Hippopotamus amphibius, the river hippopotamus (or simply the hippopotamus), and several extinct species from both recent and prehistoric times. It belongs to the family Hippopotamidae, which also includes the pygmy hippopotamus (Choeropsis liberiensis) and a number of extinct genera.

== Etymology ==
The Latin word hippopotamus is derived from the ancient Greek ἱπποπόταμος (hippopótamos), from ἵππος (híppos) 'horse' and ποταμός (potamós) 'river', together meaning 'horse of the river'. In English, the plural is "hippopotamuses".

== Anatomy ==
Hippos have a barrel-shaped body, short legs, big mouths, short tails with hair at the tips, four-toed hooves with webbing, big canines used for defense, big upper lips with sparse whiskers, and two little ears on top of their heads. Their eyes, also on top of their heads, have horizontal oval-shaped pupils, and can range from brown to green. They have two nostrils that can shut underwater.

== Species ==
The species of the genus Hippopotamus include:

=== Extant species ===
- Hippopotamus amphibius, hippopotamus

=== Extinct species ===
- †Hippopotamus aethiopicus (Africa, Early Pleistocene)
- †Hippopotamus antiquus, (Europe, Early-Middle Pleistocene) considerably larger than living hippopotamuses
- †Hippopotamus behemoth (West Asia, Early Pleistocene)
- †Hippopotamus creutzburgi, Cretan dwarf hippopotamus (Early Pleistocene)
- †Hippopotamus gorgops (Africa, West Asia, Early Pleistocene-early Middle Pleistocene) considerably larger than living hippopotamuses
- †Hippopotamus kaisensis (Africa, Late Pliocene-Early Pleistocene)
- †Hippopotamus melitensis, Maltese hippopotamus (Middle-Late Pleistocene)
- †Hippopotamus minor, Cyprus dwarf hippopotamus (late Middle Pleistocene-Late Pleistocene, synonym Phanourios minor one of the smallest known hippopotamuses)
- †Hippopotamus pentlandi, Sicilian hippopotamus (Middle-Late Pleistocene)
- †Hippopotamus sirensis (Africa, Early Pleistocene, possibly a synonym of H. gorgops)

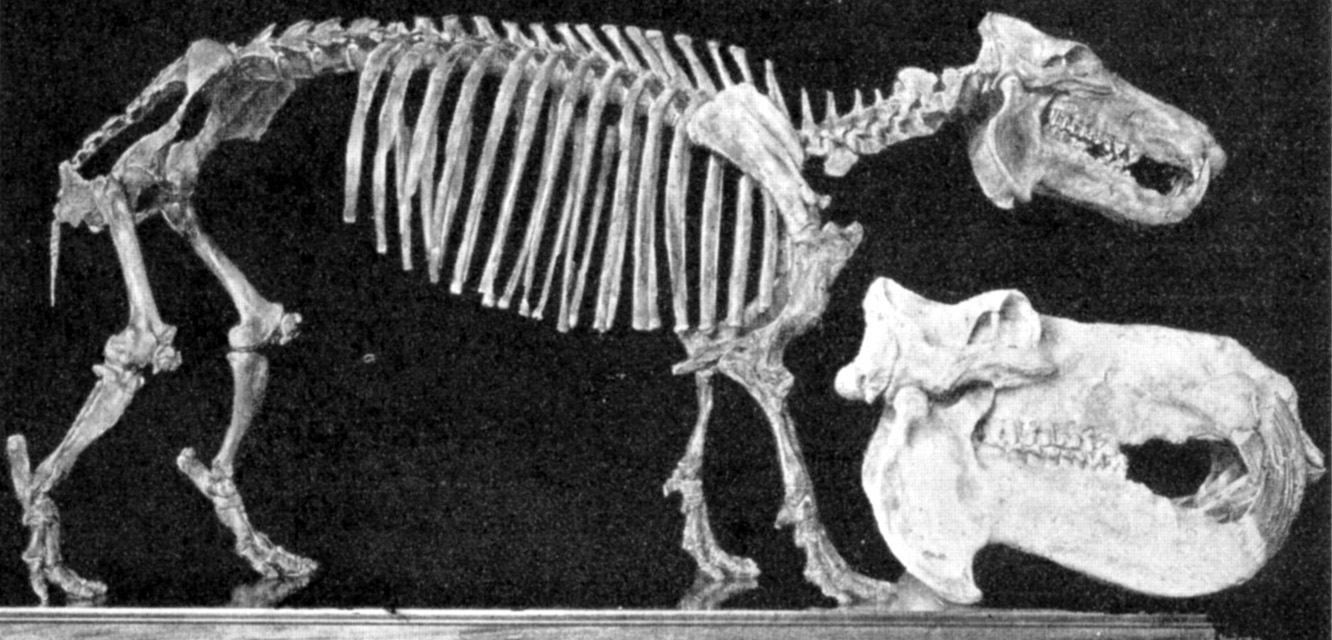
Hippopotamus madagascariensis skeleton, compared to the skull of a common hippopotamus. H. madagascariensis may have survived on Madagascar until the 17th century AD or later.

- †Malagasy hippopotamuses (Late Pleistocene-Holocene)
  - †Hippopotamus madagascariensis, Madagascar dwarf hippopotamus
  - †Hippopotamus lemerlei, Lemerle's dwarf hippopotamus
  - †Hippopotamus laloumena, Malagasy hippopotamus
