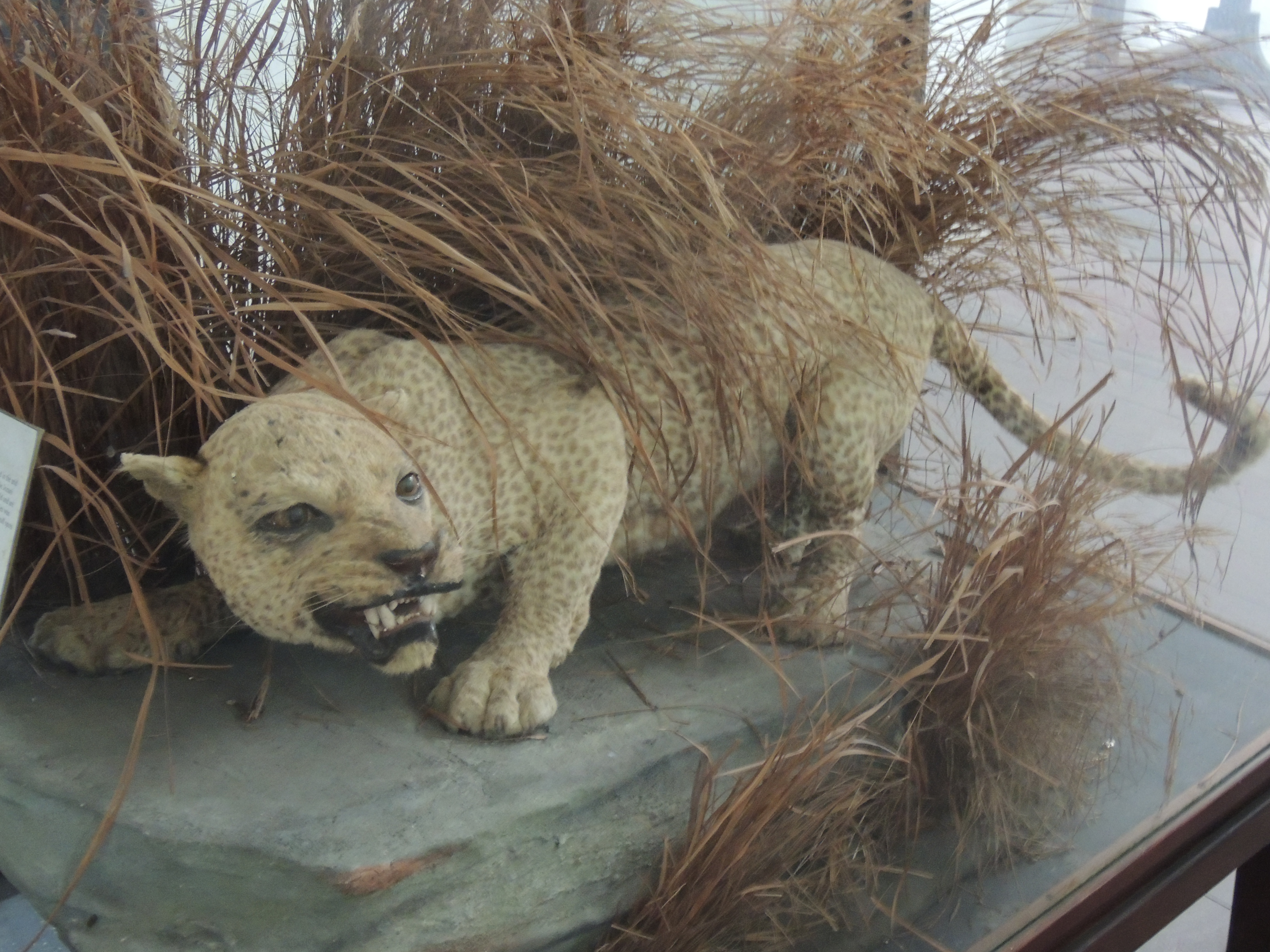
- Mounted specimen in the Zanzibar Museum

Scientific classification
- Kingdom: Animalia
- Phylum: Chordata
- Class: Mammalia
- Order: Carnivora
- Family: Felidae
- Genus: Panthera
- Species: P. pardus
- Subspecies: P. p. pardus
- Population: Zanzibar leopard

= Zanzibar leopard =

Leopard population in Zanzibar

The Zanzibar leopard is an African leopard (Panthera pardus pardus) population on Unguja Island in the Zanzibar archipelago, Tanzania, that is considered extirpated through persecution by local hunters and loss of habitat. It was the island's largest terrestrial carnivore and apex predator. Increasing conflict between people and leopards in the 20th century led to the demonization of the Zanzibar leopard and determined attempts to exterminate it. Efforts to develop a leopard conservation program in the mid-1990s were shelved when wildlife researchers concluded that there was little prospect for the population's long-term survival. In 2018, a leopard was allegedly recorded by a camera trap, thus renewing hopes for the population's survival, although some experts remain skeptical.

== Taxonomy ==
The Zanzibar leopard was described as a leopard subspecies by Reginald Innes Pocock, who proposed the scientific name Panthera pardus adersi in 1932. Following molecular genetic analysis of leopard samples, it was subsumed to the African leopard (P. p. pardus) in 1996. However, some authors continue to use P. p. adersi.

== Evolutionary history ==
The Zanzibar leopard population is thought to have evolved in isolation from mainland African leopards since at least the end of the Last Ice Age, when the island was separated from mainland Tanzania by rising sea levels. The founder effect and adaptation to local conditions produced a smaller leopard than its continental relatives, and one whose rosettes have partially disintegrated into spots. However, despite these visible differences from the mainland populations, the genetic differentiation of this population is much less than is seen for the populations presently treated as genuine subspecies, all of which occur outside of Africa; as such, all of the African populations of leopards are considered to belong to a single subspecies, including the population on Zanzibar.

== Behaviour and ecology ==
Very little is known about the Zanzibar leopard's behaviour and ecology. It has never been studied in the wild, and the last confirmed sighting of a living leopard was in the early 1980s. Most zoologists have since presumed the Zanzibar leopard to be extinct or very nearly so.

Only six skins were deposited at museums, including the type specimen of P. p. adersi in the Natural History Museum, London, and a much-faded mounted specimen in the Zanzibar Museum. However, Zanzibar government statistics indicate that leopards were still being killed by hunters in the mid-1990s, and islanders continue to report sightings and livestock predation.

== Conservation ==
Descriptions of the leopard and its habits by rural Zanzibaris are characterized by the widespread belief that witches keep leopards and send them to harm or harass villagers. This belief includes elaborate ideas about how witches breed and train leopards to do their evil bidding. With these ideas, local farmers explain predation by leopards, and more generally also their appearance "out of place" in the vicinity of farms and villages.

The growth of human population and agriculture in the 20th century was largely responsible for this state of affairs, as people encroached on leopard habitat and prey base. Increasing conflict between humans and leopards led to a series of campaigns to exterminate the latter. These campaigns were localized at first, but became island-wide after the Zanzibar Revolution of 1964, when a combined anti-witchcraft and leopard-killing campaign was launched under the leadership of a witchfinder. The long-term result of this campaign and the subsequent classification of the leopard as "vermin" brought the leopard population to the brink of extinction. However, alleged leopard sightings are still being reported, and islanders believe that the Zanzibar leopard is still alive. By the mid-1990s, the Zanzibar leopard population was considered extinct. In 1997 and 2001, rumors circulated about the discovery of leopard scat, but both samples were lost before they could be analyzed.

A leopard conservation program was drafted by the CARE-funded Jozani-Chwaka Bay Conservation Project, but abandoned in 1997 when wildlife researchers failed to find evidence for the leopard. Local wildlife officials, however, remained more optimistic about the leopard's survival, and some Zanzibaris have proposed approaching alleged leopard keepers in order to ask them to display their leopards to paying visitors. Villagers sometimes offer to take tourists or researchers to see "domesticated" leopards in return for cash, but so far none of these "kept leopard chases" has been known to end in a successful sighting.

These conflicting perceptions of the Zanzibar leopard's status and the possibility of its conservation have yet to be reconciled, presenting a dilemma that has been highlighted by researchers.

In 2018, a leopard was recorded on Unguja Island by a camera trap set during filming of the Animal Planet series Extinct or Alive. Some authorities do not consider this video to be reliable evidence due to the exact locality of the video being unknown, and few reliable sources have picked up on it. However, its author (Forrest Galante) has defended its authenticity. Although the footage definitely shows a leopard, the exact pattern of rosettes remains unclear, and it could be a mainland African leopard introduced to Zanzibar. DNA evidence may be the only way to verify this video.

== See also ==
- Leopard subspecies: African leopard • Amur leopard • Arabian leopard • Panthera pardus tulliana • Indian leopard • Indochinese leopard • Javan leopard • Sri Lankan leopard • Panthera pardus spelaea
