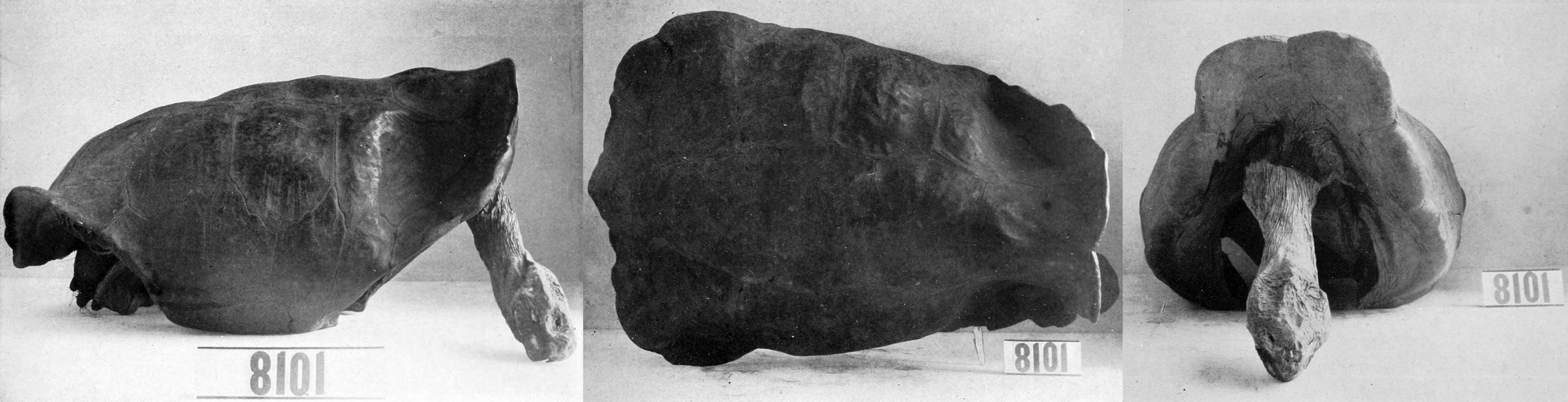
- Holotype adult male specimen, collected by Rollo H. Beck in 1906.

Conservation status
- Critically endangered, possibly extinct (IUCN 3.1)

Scientific classification
- Kingdom: Animalia
- Phylum: Chordata
- Class: Reptilia
- Order: Testudines
- Suborder: Cryptodira
- Family: Testudinidae
- Genus: Chelonoidis
- Species: C. niger
- Subspecies: C. n. phantasticus

Trinomial name
- Chelonoidis niger phantasticus (Van Denburgh, 1907)

Synonyms
- Testudo phantasticus Van Denburgh, 1907; Geochelone nigra phantastica Iverson, 1992; Chelonoidis 2 phantastica; Chelonoidis phantasticus

= Fernandina Island Galápagos tortoise =

Critically endangered subspecies of tortoise

Chelonoidis niger phantasticus (commonly known as the Fernandina Island Galápagos tortoise or Narborough Island giant tortoise) is a subspecies of Galápagos tortoise that was discovered in 1906 and thought extinct, until a single female was discovered living on Fernandina Island by an expedition in February 2019. In May 2021, a genetic test carried out by scientists from the California Academy of Sciences confirmed that the single female tortoise discovered in 2019 is from the subspecies Chelonoidis niger phantasticus. The subspecies name has often been erroneously spelled as phantastica, an error introduced in the 1980s when Chelonoidis was elevated to genus and mistakenly treated as feminine, an error recognized and fixed in 2017.

== Taxonomy ==
Chelonoidis niger phantasticus, like all the other Galápagos tortoises, is sometimes considered a subspecies of Chelonoidis niger, and sometimes considered a valid species in itself. Rhodin et al. (2010) lists them separately but under the heading "C. niger species complex".

== Discovery and rediscovery ==
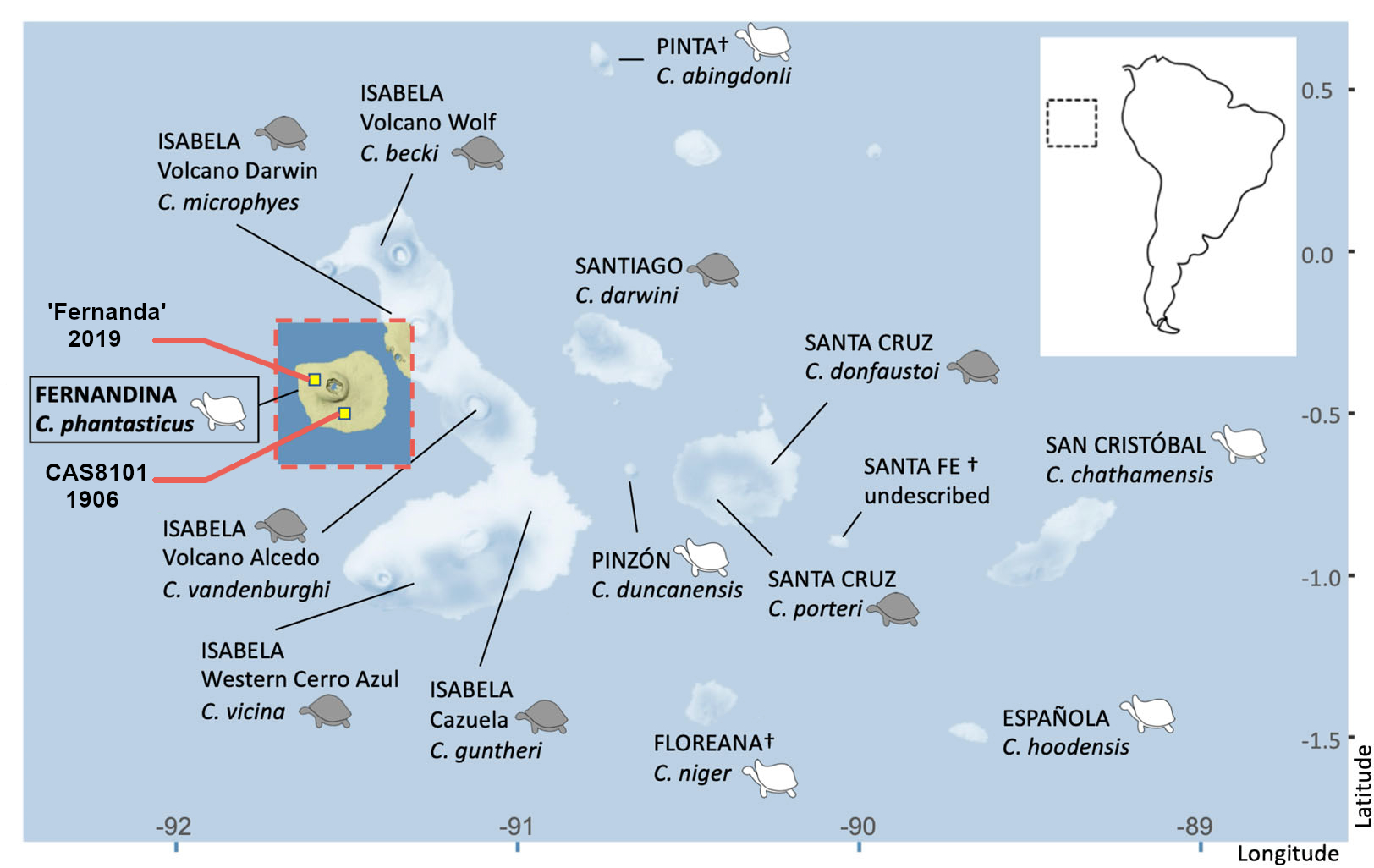
Map showing locations of Galapagos tortoises

Originally known from only one male specimen killed and collected by members of the 1906 California Academy of Sciences expedition, there were discoveries of putative tortoise droppings and cactus bite marks in 1964 and 2013, and an unconfirmed sighting in 2009.

No confirmed live tortoises nor remains were found on Fernandina until an expedition in February 2019 discovered a potential endling, an elderly female. The tortoise was transferred to a breeding center on nearby Santa Cruz Island, for the purpose of conservation and genetic tests. There are efforts being made to find a suitable male breeding mate for the female.

The 2019 expedition was undertaken by the Galapagos National Park Directorate and Galapagos Conservancy and was led by Washington Tapia-Aguilera - Director of Conservation at the Galapagos Conservancy and director of the Giant Tortoise Restoration Initiative - and included four rangers: Jeffreys Málaga, Eduardo Vilema, Roberto Ballesteros, and Simon Villamar. The search and discovery were shown in Forrest Galante's television show, Extinct or Alive (season 2, episode 1). While some accounts have credited Galante with the discovery, this is disputed by Tapia-Aguilera who has highlighted that "Ecuadorian park ranger Jeffreys Málaga was the one that knew the land, tracked the tortoise, and ultimately made the discovery before calling over the rest of the team."

Galante himself wrote in his 2021 memoir that Málaga spotted the tortoise, prompting Galante to race toward it and lift it up. He continued to accuse Tapia-Aguilera of erasing Galante’s own involvement in the discovery to bolster his career, and said he’d have been glad to give the local biologists the lead and share credit with them had they asked. The Galapagos Conservancy has reportedly launched further expeditions to Fernandina Island searching for a male tortoise, rebuffing Galante’s attempts to collaborate again.

On 25 May 2021, officials announced that genetic tests had confirmed that the female tortoise found in 2019 is indeed a member of the subspecies Chelonoidis niger phantasticus. Geneticists from Yale University in the United States compared the female's DNA with a sample extracted from the male specimen found in 1906. In 2022, the genetic findings were formally published.

The Director of the Galapagos National Park, Danny Rueda, has said that a further expedition will be launched to Fernandina Island to try to locate other members of the same subspecies.

== See also ==
- Floreana giant tortoise
- Lazarus taxon
- Lonesome George
