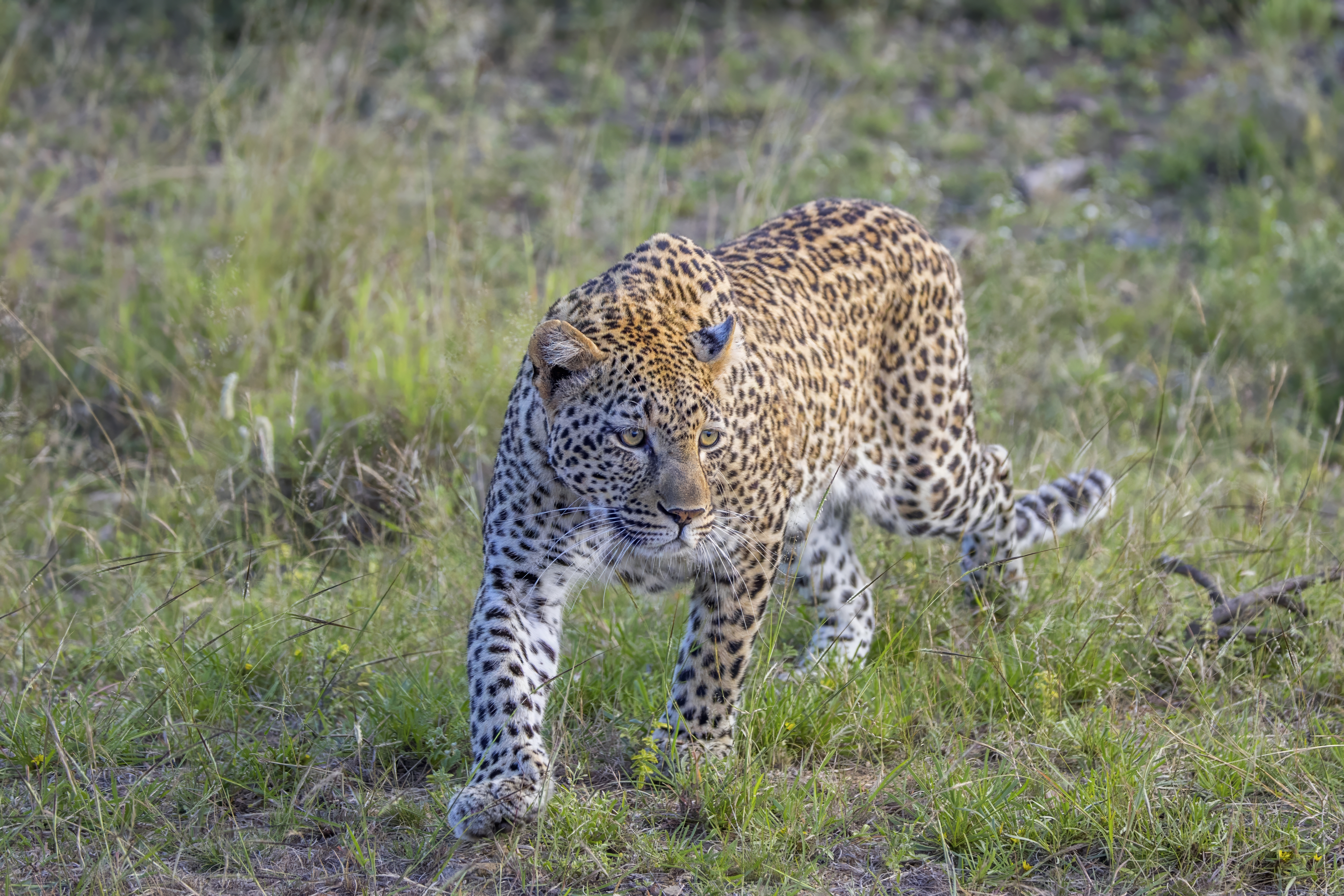
- Leopard in Kruger National Park

Conservation status
- Vulnerable (IUCN 3.1)

Scientific classification
- Kingdom: Animalia
- Phylum: Chordata
- Class: Mammalia
- Order: Carnivora
- Family: Felidae
- Genus: Panthera
- Species: P. pardus
- Subspecies: P. p. pardus

Trinomial name
- Panthera pardus pardus (Linnaeus, 1758)

Synonyms
- List: P. p. panthera (Schreber, 1777); P. p. leopardus (Schreber, 1777); P. p. melanotica (Günther, 1885); P. p. suahelicus (Neumann, 1900); P. p. nanopardus (Thomas, 1904); P. p. ruwenzorii (Camerano, 1906); P. p. chui (Heller, 1913); P. p. reichenowi (Cabrera, 1918); P. p. antinorii (de Beaux, 1923); P. p. ituriensis (Allen, 1924); P. p. adusta Pocock, 1927; P. p. shortridgei (Pocock, 1932); P. p. brockmani (Pocock, 1932); P. p. puella (Pocock, 1932); P. p. adersi Pocock, 1932

= African leopard =

Leopard subspecies

The African leopard (Panthera pardus pardus) is the nominate subspecies of the leopard, native to Africa. It is widely distributed in most of sub-Saharan Africa, but the historical range has been fragmented in the course of habitat conversion. Leopards have also been recorded in North Africa as well.

== Taxonomy ==
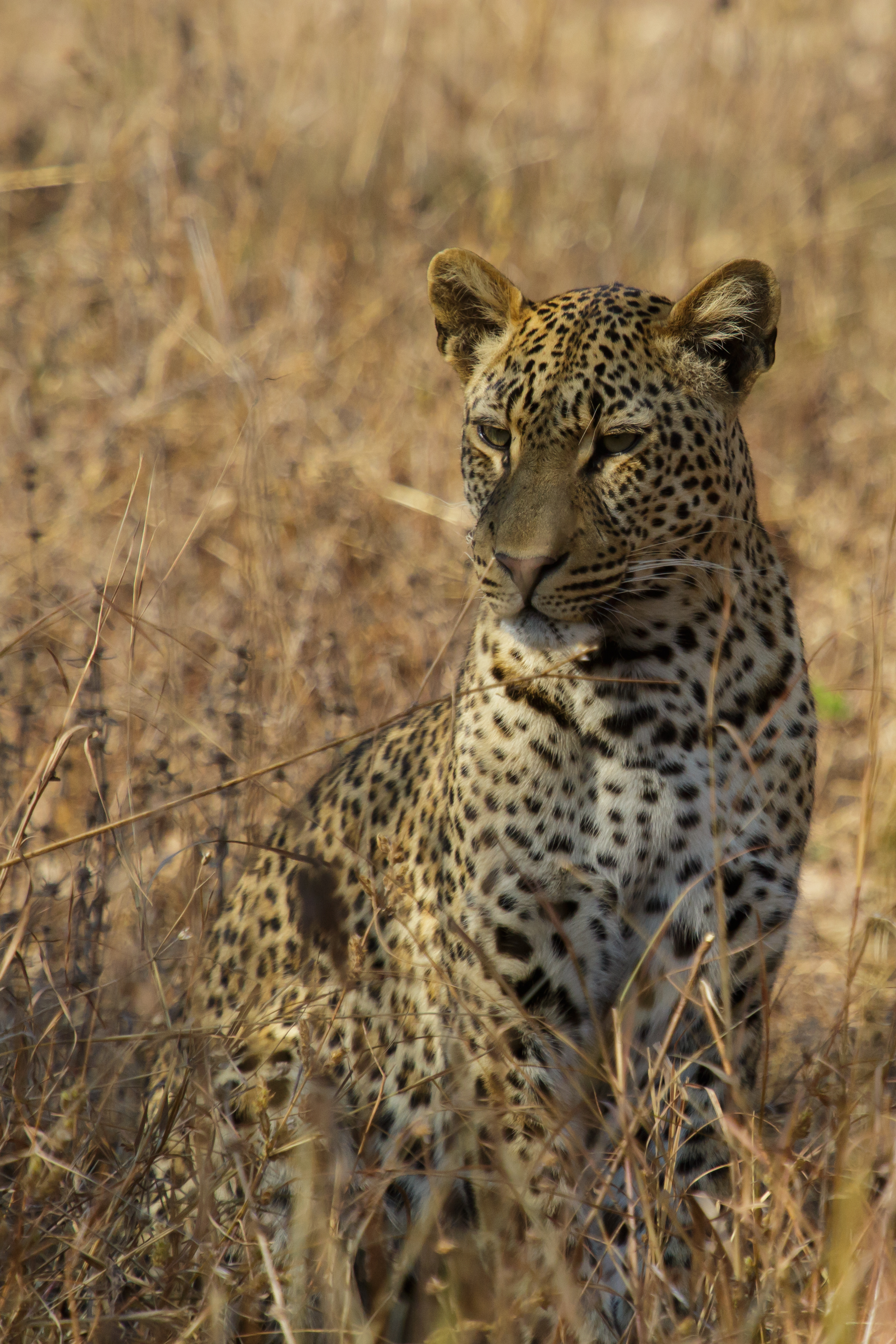
African leopard in South Luangwa National Park, Zambia

Felis pardus was the scientific name used by Carl Linnaeus in the 10th edition of Systema Naturae in 1758. His description was based on descriptions by earlier naturalists such as Conrad Gessner. He assumed that the leopard occurred in India. In the 18th and 19th centuries, several naturalists described various leopard skins and skulls from Africa, including:

- Felis pardus panthera proposed by Johann Christian Daniel von Schreber in 1778 based on descriptions by earlier naturalists
- Felis leopardus var. melanotica by Albert Günther in 1885 from the Cape of Good Hope, Southern Africa
- Felis leopardus suahelicus by Oscar Neumann in 1900 from the Tanganyika territory
- Felis leopardus nanopardus by Oldfield Thomas in 1904 from Italian Somaliland
- Felis pardus ruwenzorii by Lorenzo Camerano in 1906 from the Ruwenzori and Virunga Mountains
- Felis pardus chui by Edmund Heller in 1913 from Uganda
- Felis pardus iturensis by Joel Asaph Allen in 1924 from the Belgian Congo
- Felis pardus reichenowi by Ángel Cabrera in 1927 from Cameroon
- Panthera pardus adusta by Reginald Innes Pocock in 1927 from the Ethiopian Highlands
- Panthera pardus adersi by Pocock in 1932 from Unguja Island, Zanzibar
- Panthera pardus brockmani by Pocock in 1932 from Somaliland

Later in the 20th century, leopards in Africa were classified in four subspecies, Barbary leopard (P. p. panthera), Central African leopard (P. p. shortridgei), East African leopard (P. p. suahelicus), and West African leopard (P. p. reichenovi). Results of genetic analyses conducted in the 1990s indicate that all African leopard populations are closely related and represent only one subspecies, namely P. p. pardus. However, an analysis of molecular variance and pairwise fixation index of African leopard museum specimens revealed ND-5 locus differences among five major haplogroups: Central–Southern Africa, Southern Africa, West Africa, coastal West–Central Africa, and Central–East Africa. In some cases, fixation indices showed higher diversity than for Panthera pardus nimr and Panthera pardus tulliana in Asia.

== Characteristics ==
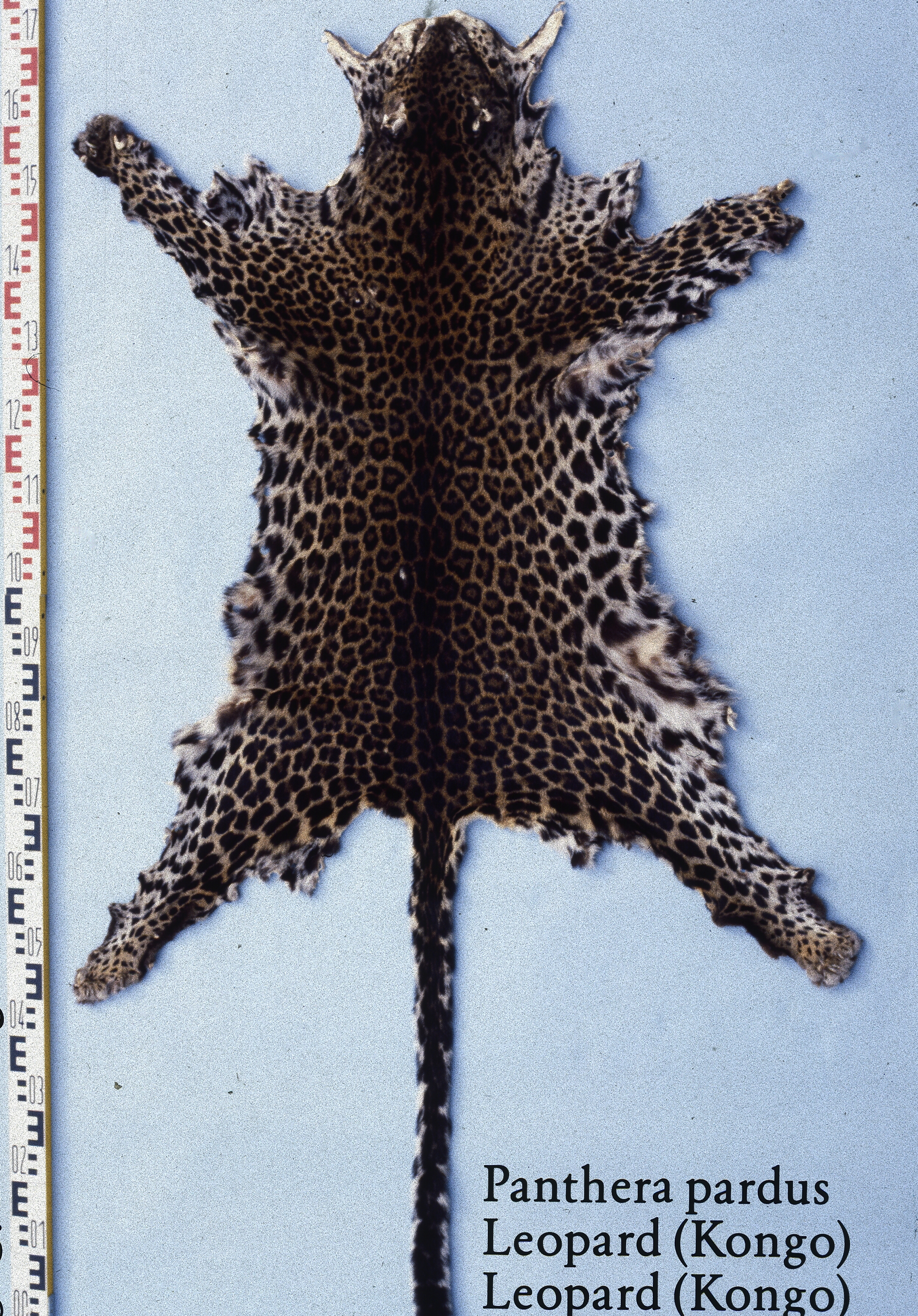
A dark-coloured leopard skin from Central Africa

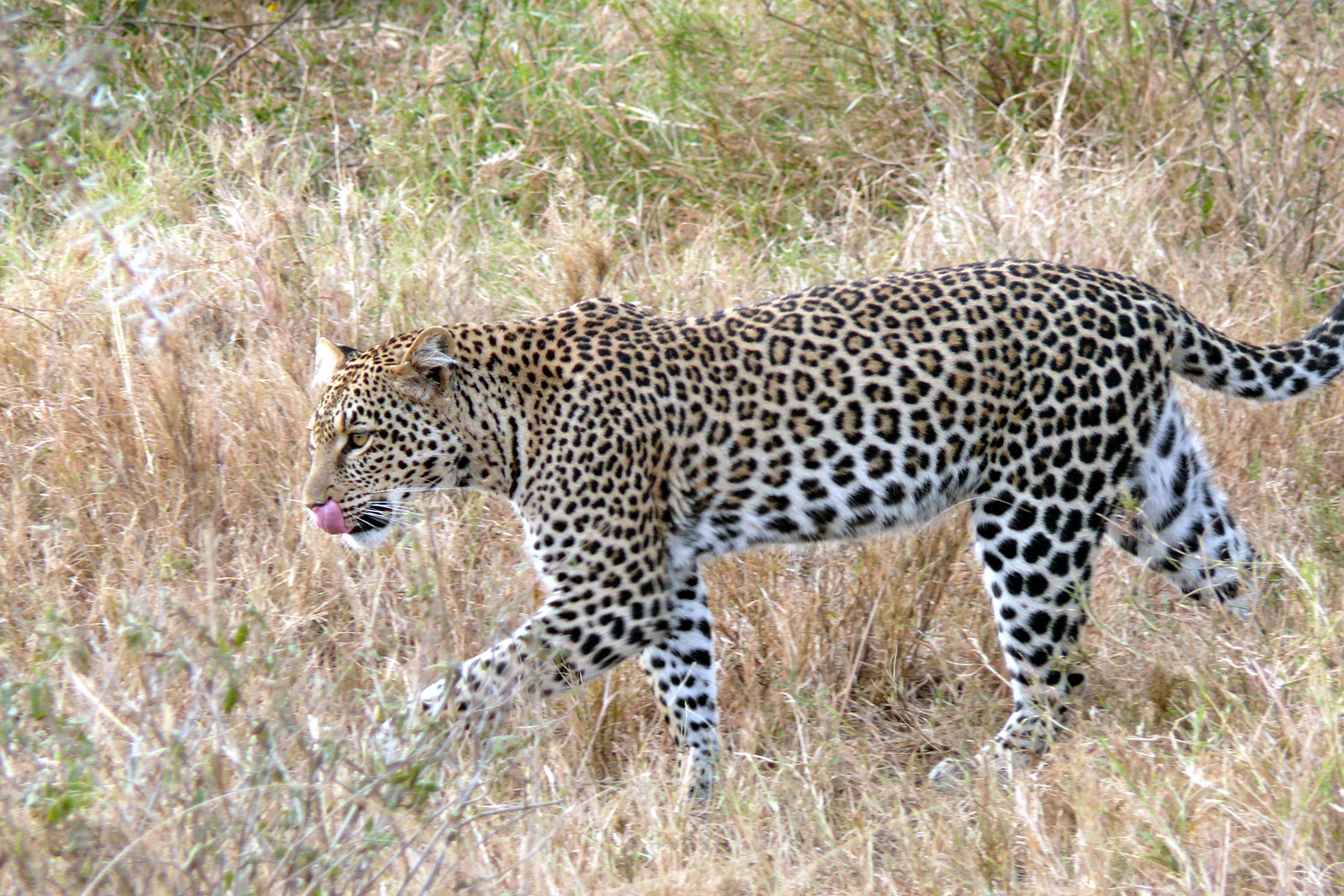
A leopard in the Serengeti

The African leopard exhibits great variation in coat color, depending on location and habitat. Coat colour varies from pale yellow to deep gold or tawny, and sometimes black, and is patterned with black rosettes while the head, lower limbs and belly are spotted with solid black. Male leopards are larger, averaging 58 kg (128 lb) with 90 kg (200 lb) being the maximum weight attained by a male. Females weigh about 37.5 kg (83 lb) on average.

The African leopard is sexually dimorphic; males are larger and heavier than females. Between 1996 and 2000, 11 adult leopards were radio-collared on Namibian farmlands. Males weighed 37.5 to 52.3 kg (83 to 115 lb) only, and females 24 to 33.5 kg (53 to 74 lb). The heaviest known leopard weighed about 96 kg (212 lb), and was recorded in South West Africa.

According to Alfred Edward Pease, black leopards in North Africa were similar in size to lions. An Algerian leopard killed in 1913 was reported to have measured approximately 8 ft 10 in (2.69 m), before being skinned.

Leopards inhabiting the mountains of the Cape Provinces appear smaller and less heavy than leopards further north. Leopards in Somalia and Ethiopia are also said to be smaller.

The skull of a West African leopard specimen measured 11.25 in (286 mm) in basal length, and 7.125 in (181.0 mm) in breadth, and weighed 1 lb 12 oz (0.79 kg). To compare, that of an Indian leopard measured 11.2 in (280 mm) in basal length, and 7.9 in (20 cm) in breadth, and weighed 2 lb 4 oz (1.0 kg).

== Distribution and habitat ==
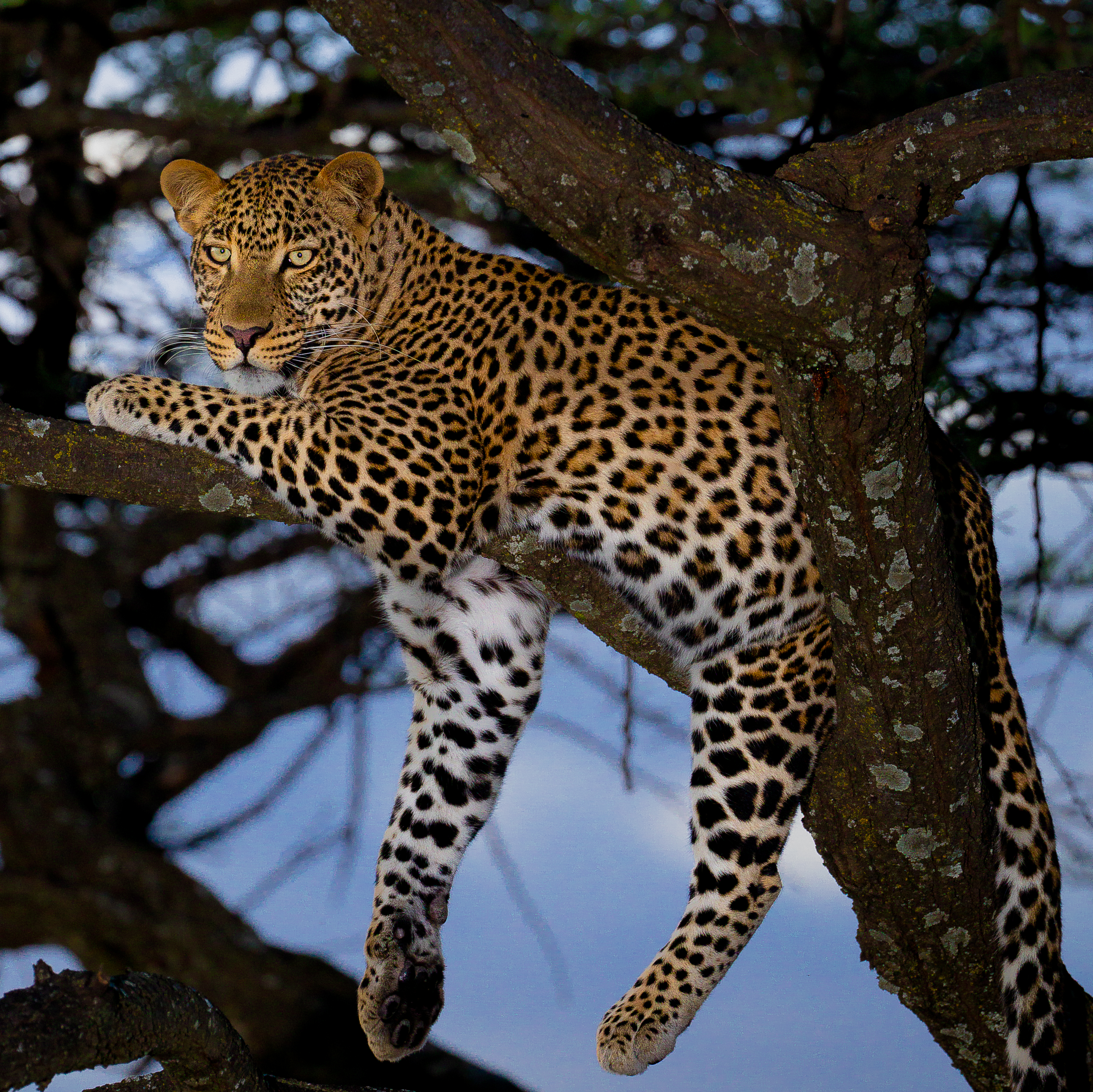
Male leopard in the Maasai Mara

The African leopards inhabited a wide range of habitats within Africa, from mountainous forests to grasslands and savannahs, excluding only extremely sandy desert. It is most at risk in areas of semi-desert, where scarce resources often result in conflict with nomadic farmers and their livestock. It used to occur in most of sub-Saharan Africa, occupying both rainforest and arid desert habitats. It lived in all habitats with annual rainfall above 50 mm (2.0 in), and can penetrate areas with less than this amount of rainfall along river courses. It ranges up to 5,700 m (18,700 ft), has been sighted on high slopes of the Ruwenzori and Virunga volcanoes, and observed when drinking thermal water 37 °C (99 °F) in the Virunga National Park.

The African leopard appears to be successful at adapting to altered natural habitat and settled environments in the absence of intense persecution. It has often been recorded close to major cities. But already in the 1980s, it had become rare throughout much of West Africa. Now, it remains patchily distributed within historical limits. During surveys in 2013, it was recorded in Gbarpolu County and Bong County in the Upper Guinean forests of Liberia.

The leopard is rare in North Africa where a relict population persisted in the Atlas Mountains of Morocco until the 1990s, in forest and mountain steppe in elevations of 300–2,500 m (980–8,200 ft), where the climate is temperate to cold. The last individual in the area was recorded in 1996. In 2005, leopard DNA was detected in the Hoggar Mountains of southern Algeria, in the central Sahara.

A leopard killed in Elba Protected Area in southeastern Egypt in 2014 was the first sighting of a leopard in the country since the 1950s.

In 2016, a leopard was recorded for the first time in a semi-arid area of Yechilay in northern Ethiopia.

== Behavior and ecology ==
In Kruger National Park, male leopards and female leopards with cubs were more active at night than solitary females. The highest rates of daytime activity were recorded for leopards using thorn thickets during the wet season, when impala also used them. Leopards are generally most active between sunset and sunrise, and kill more prey at this time.

=== Diet and hunting ===
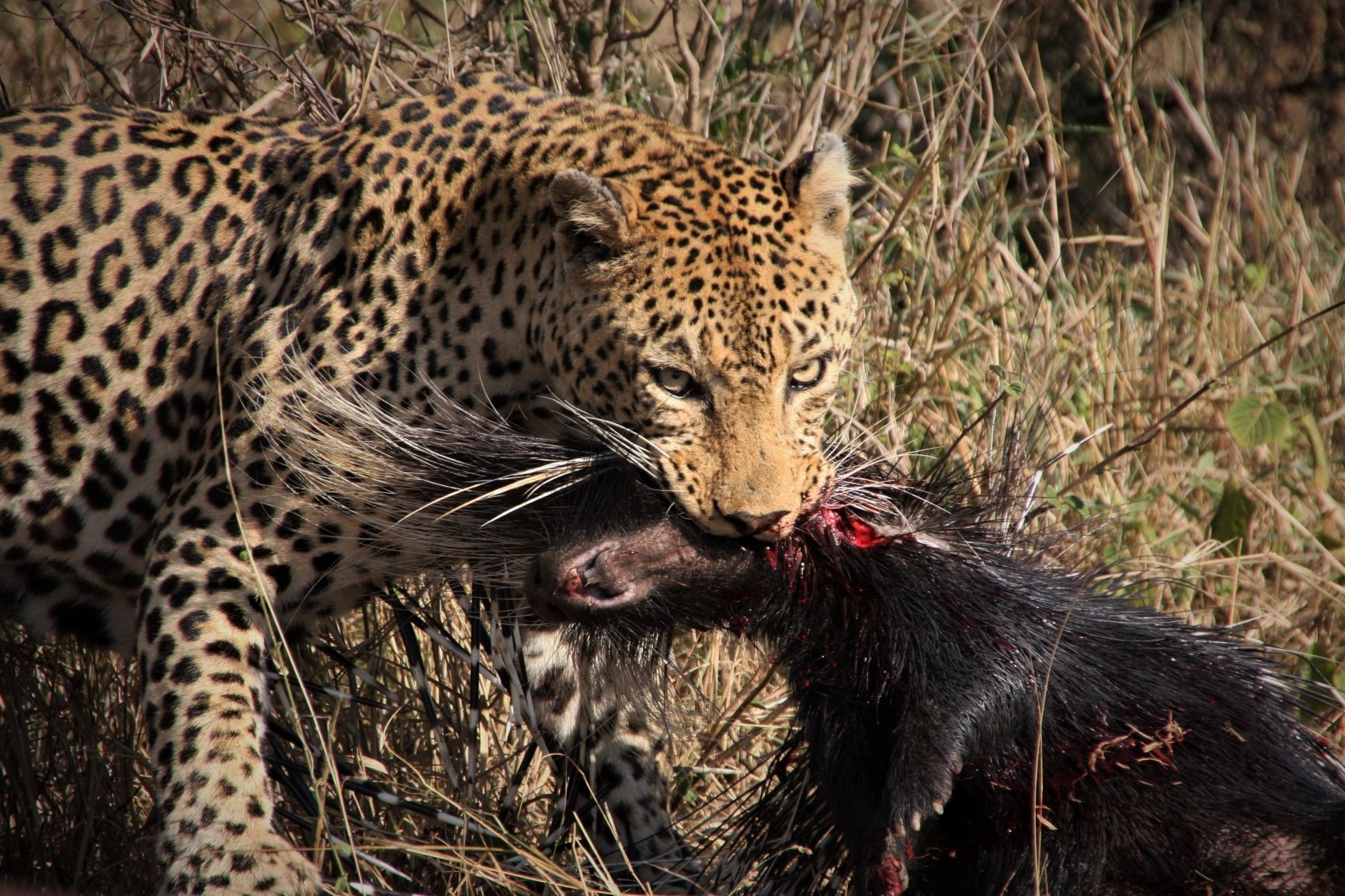
A young male leopard with a Cape porcupine kill in Kruger National Park

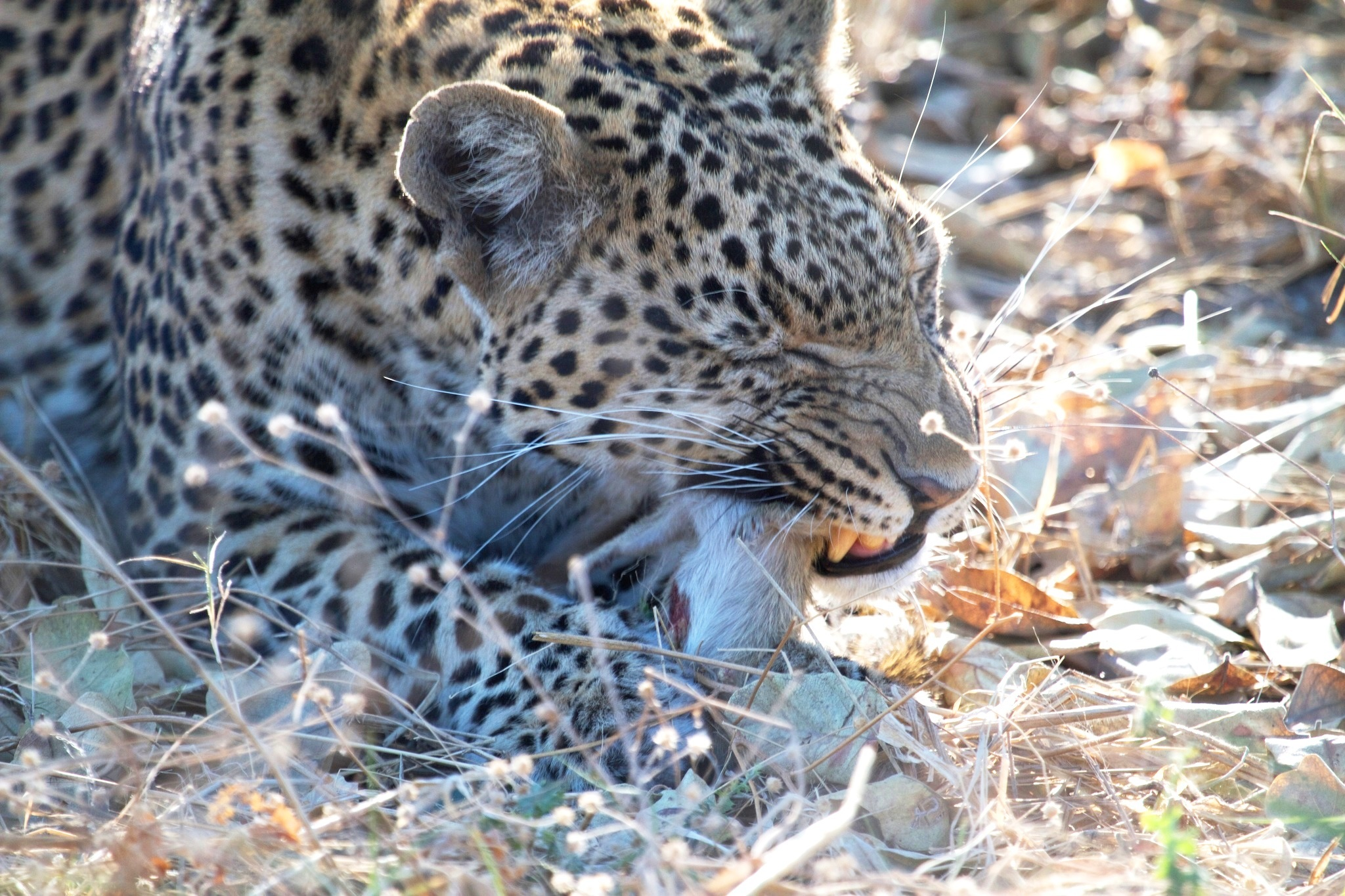
Eating a Smith's bush squirrel

The leopard has an exceptional ability to adapt to changes in prey availability, and has a very broad diet. It takes small prey where large ungulates are less common. The known prey of leopards ranges from dung beetles to adult elands, which can reach 900 kg (2,000 lb). In sub-Saharan Africa, at least 92 prey species have been documented in leopard scat, including rodents, birds, small and large antelopes, hyraxes, hares, and arthropods. Leopards generally focus their hunting activity on locally abundant medium-sized ungulates in the 20 to 80 kg (44 to 176 lb) range, while opportunistically taking other prey. Average intervals between ungulate kills range from seven to 12–13 days. Leopards often hide large kills in trees, a behavior for which great strength is required. There have been several observations of leopards hoisting carcasses of young giraffes, estimated to weigh up to 125 kg (276 lb), i.e. 2–3 times the weight of the leopard, up to 5.7 m (19 ft) into trees.

In Serengeti National Park, leopards were radio-collared for the first time in the early 1970s. Their hunting at night was difficult to watch; the best time for observing them was after dawn. Of their 64 daytime hunts, only three were successful. In this woodland area, they preyed mostly on impalas, both adult and young, and caught some Thomson's gazelles in the dry season. Occasionally, they successfully hunted warthogs, dik-diks, reedbucks, duikers, steenboks, blue wildebeest and topi calves, jackals, Cape hares, guineafowl and starlings. They were less successful in hunting plains zebras, Coke's hartebeests, giraffes, mongooses, genets, hyraxes and small birds. Scavenging from the carcasses of large animals made up a small proportion of their food. In the tropical rainforests of Central Africa, their diet consists of duikers and primates. Some individual leopards have shown a strong preference for pangolins and porcupines.

In North Africa, the leopard preys on Barbary macaque (Macaca sylvanus). Analysis of leopard scat in Taï National Park revealed that primates are primary leopard prey during the day. In Gabon's Lope National Park, the most important prey species was found to be the red river hog (Potamochoerus porcus), African buffaloes (Syncerus caffer) and greater cane rats (Thryonomys swinderianus), comprised 13% each of the consumed biomass.

In the Central African Republic's Dzanga-Sangha Complex of Protected Areas, a leopard reportedly attacked and pursued a large western lowland gorilla, but did not catch it. Gorilla parts found in leopard scat indicates that the leopard either scavenged on gorilla remains or killed it. African leopards were observed preying on adult eastern gorillas in the Kisoro area near Uganda's borders with Rwanda and the Democratic Republic of the Congo.

== Threats ==
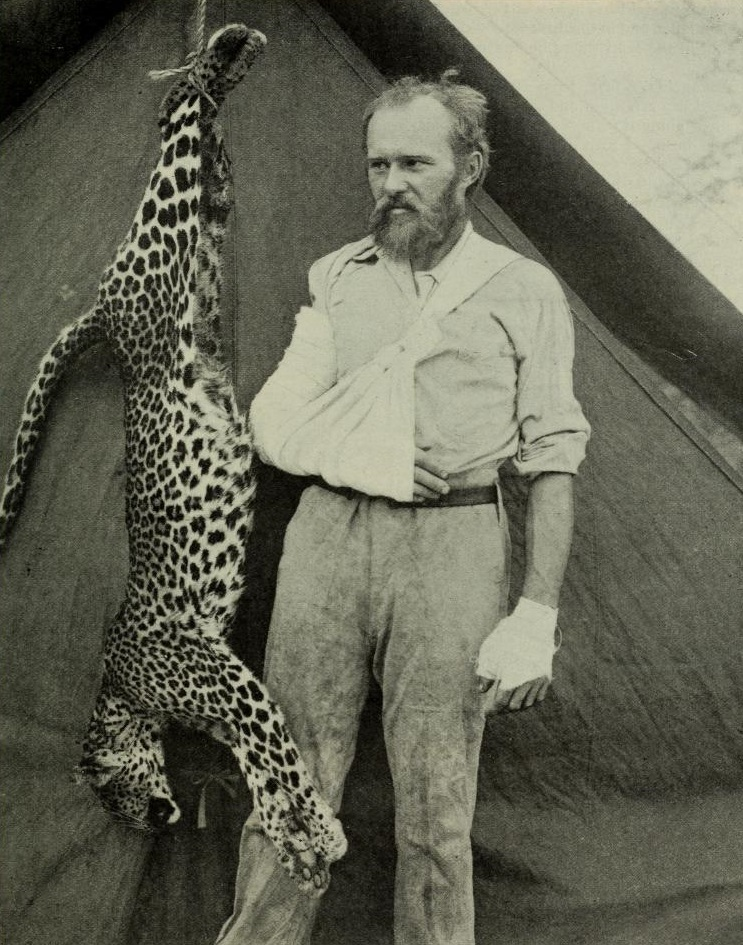
An African leopard killed by Carl Akeley (right) barehanded

Throughout Africa, the major threats to leopards are habitat conversion and intense persecution, especially in retribution for real and perceived livestock loss. The Upper Guinean forests in Liberia are considered a biodiversity hotspot, but have already been fragmented into two blocks. Large tracts are affected by commercial logging and mining activities, and are converted for agricultural use including large-scale oil palm plantations in concessions obtained by a foreign company.

The impact of trophy hunting on populations is unclear, but may have impacts at the demographic and population level, especially when females are shot. In Tanzania, only males are allowed to be hunted, but females comprised 28.6% of 77 trophies shot between 1995 and 1998. Removing an excessively high number of males may produce a cascade of deleterious effects on the population. Although male leopards provide no parental care to cubs, the presence of the sire allows females to raise cubs with a reduced risk of infanticide by other males. There are few reliable observations of infanticide in leopards, but new males entering the population are likely to kill existing cubs.

Analysis of leopard scats and camera trapping surveys in contiguous forest landscapes in the Congo Basin revealed a high dietary niche overlap and an exploitative competition between leopards and bushmeat hunters. With increasing proximity to settlements and concomitant human hunting pressure, leopards exploit smaller prey and occur at considerably reduced population densities. In the presence of intensive bushmeat hunting surrounding human settlements, leopards appear entirely absent. Transhumant pastoralists from the border area between Sudan and the Central African Republic take their livestock to the Chinko area. They are accompanied by armed merchants who engage in poaching large herbivores, sale of bushmeat and trading leopard skins in Am Dafok. Surveys in the area revealed that the leopard population decreased from 97 individuals in 2012 to 50 individuals in 2017. Rangers confiscated large amounts of poison in the camps of livestock herders, who admitted that they use it for poisoning predators.

== Conservation ==
The leopard is listed in CITES Appendix I. Hunting is banned in Zambia and Botswana, and was suspended in South Africa for 2016.

Leopard populations are present in several protected areas, including:

- Taï National Park
- Etosha National Park
- Virunga National Park
- Kruger National Park

== See also ==
- Indian leopard
- Amur leopard
- Panthera pardus tulliana
- Arabian leopard
- Indochinese leopard
- Javan leopard
- Sri Lankan leopard
- Zanzibar leopard
- Panthera pardus spelaea
- Chinese leopard
