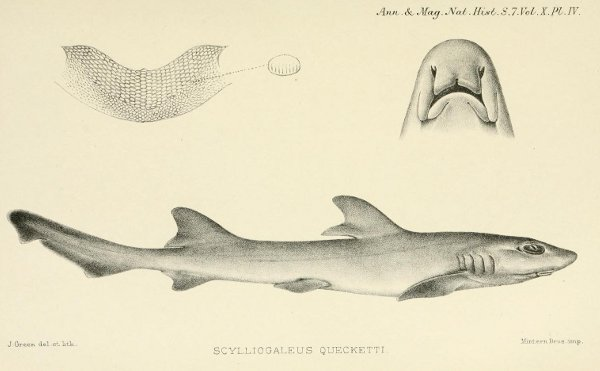

Conservation status
- Vulnerable (IUCN 3.1)

Scientific classification
- Kingdom: Animalia
- Phylum: Chordata
- Class: Chondrichthyes
- Subclass: Elasmobranchii
- Division: Selachii
- Order: Carcharhiniformes
- Family: Triakidae
- Genus: Scylliogaleus; Boulenger, 1902
- Species: S. quecketti

Binomial name
- Scylliogaleus quecketti Boulenger, 1902
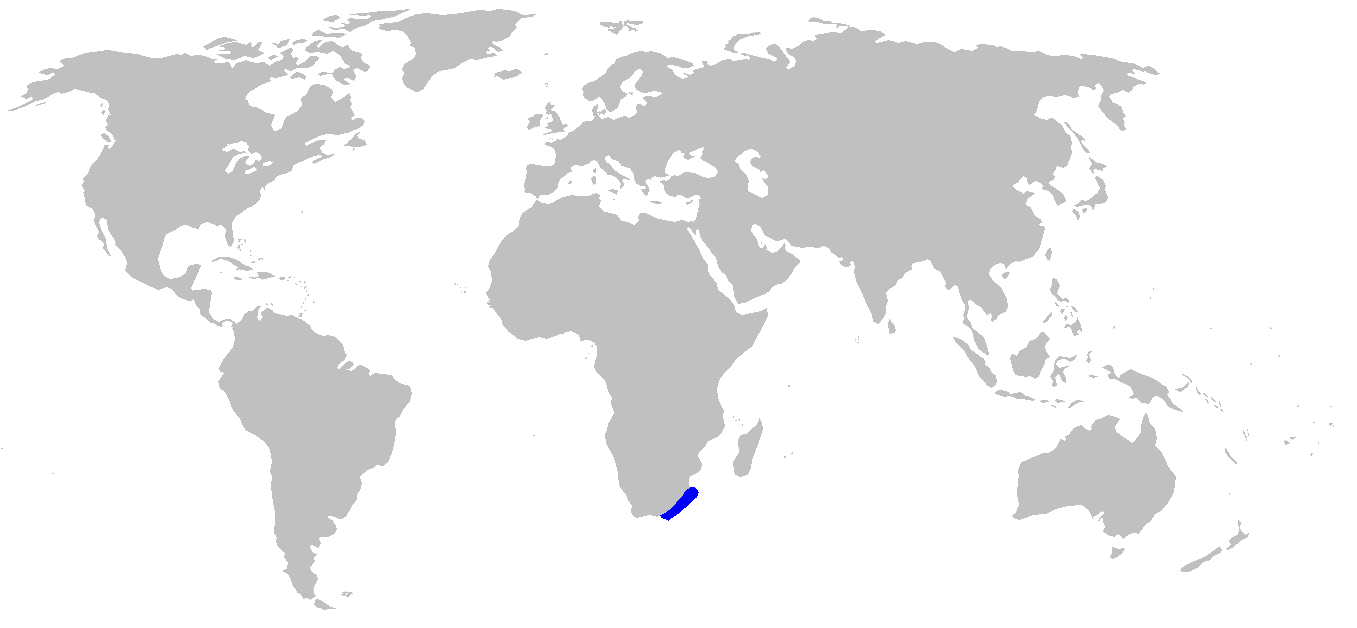

= Flapnose houndshark =

Species of shark

The flapnose houndshark (Scylliogaleus quecketti) is a houndshark of the family Triakidae, and the only member of the genus Scylliogaleus. It is found in the waters off subtropical South Africa, in the western Indian Ocean between latitudes 27 and 33°S. This shark is estimated to be 2 to 3 feet in length. They are gray with a white underside, and they have a blunt nose with large fused nasal flaps. They have small pebble like teeth and their first and second dorsal fin are the same size. They feed primarily on crustaceans such as crabs, shrimps, lobsters and some molluscs like squid. Flapnose houndsharks are viviparous and have low fecundity having just two to four pups in a litter. After gestating for nine to ten months, females give birth to pups that are about 34 cm long. Newborn flapnose houndsharks have white coloured edges on their dorsal, anal and caudal fin. There have only been 30 recorded specimens. Not seen by biologists since 1902, one was captured in 2020 on the show Extinct or Alive. It was tagged with a pop-up tracking sensor and released.
