= Extinct or Alive =

Wildlife documentary

- Genre: Documentary
- Directed by: Thomas Backer; Patrick DeLuca
- Presented by: Forrest Galante
- Composers: Brad Segal; William Myers; Kevin H. Ross; Brian Michael Fuller; Jordan Pier; Nicholas Johnatan Tyler
- Country of origin: United States of America
- Original language: English
- No. of seasons: 2
- No. of episodes: 18 (+5 specials)

Production
- Executive producers: Thomas Backer; Patrick DeLuca; Keith Hoffman; Eric Evangelista; Shannon Evangelista
- Producers: Sarah Russell; Jesse Colaizzi; Forrest Galante; Drew Oberholtzer; Tony Casorio; Brian Paetzold
- Running time: 42 minutes
- Production company: Hot Snakes Media

Original release
- Network: Animal Planet
- Release: June 10, 2018 – July 16, 2021

Extinct or Alive is an American wildlife documentary television programme produced for Animal Planet by Hot Snakes Media of New York City, the United States. It is hosted by wildlife biologist and television personality Forrest Galante, who travels to different locations around the globe to learn about possibly extinct animals and whether or not there is a chance that they may still be extant. The series has claimed to have been involved in the rediscoveries of the Fernandina Island Galápagos tortoise and Rio Apaporis caiman, along with the possible rediscoveries of the Zanzibar leopard and Cape lion (or a direct descendant of the Cape lion). Additionally, the series recorded the first ever footage of Miller's langur. However, aside from the Miller's Langur, much of this is still debated by scientists, and there is yet to be any evidence that Forrest Galante or any of the group actually found these animals first, aside from a few sharks which were already known to not be extinct.

== Cast ==
- Forrest Galante – Host and team leader

== Notable case findings ==
During filming for the show in 2018, a camera trap caught apparent footage of a Zanzibar leopard on Unguja Island. The animal appeared smaller than specimens from the mainland, and seemed to have smaller, more solid spots than normally seen on African leopards. Further investigations are planned in order to confirm whether or not this is a Zanzibar leopard, and whether a viable population still exists.

During the shooting of a Shark Week special on the island of Sri Lanka, Forrest's wife Jessica discovered a pair of deceased sharks that had previously been killed by fishermen. Although one of the sharks turned out to be a bull shark, DNA testing of the second specimen suggested that it could be a Pondicherry shark, a species that hadn't been seen since 1979. Although some regional experts are confident that the shark found in the episode is a Pondicherry shark, additional molecular confirmation is needed before the shark's identity can be confirmed.

While shooting footage for Season 2 on the remote Galápagos Islands chain in February 2019, the team discovered a single female Fernandina Island Galápagos tortoise, presumed extinct since 1906. Members of the Turtle Conservancy later analyzed the findings, saying that pending genetic confirmation, the photos "almost undoubtedly" show the lost animal. The tortoise was described as being “in good health” but “underweight,” and was transported to the Fausto Llerena Tortoise Breeding Center in Isla Santa Cruz for the purpose of conservation and genetic tests. Trace evidence found on the expedition indicated that more individuals likely exist in the wild, and new searches were being planned to find a male Fernandina Tortoise that could potentially save the species. As shown by the episode in question (but contradicted on Galante's personal website) Washington Tapia-Aguilera, a biologist at the Galapagos Conservancy and director of the Giant Tortoise Restoration Initiative, was the one who actually found the single female tortoise and thus rediscovered the species.

While shooting footage for Season 2 in Zimbabwe in 2019, the team collected DNA samples from an abnormally large lion that had recently been sighted in the area. Upon analyzing the DNA, the male was found to have 14% different DNA from a typical African lion, suggesting that it may have remanent genetics from the Cape lion population, which went extinct in the 1800s. The team theorizes that, through continued breeding, a pure Cape lion might one day be brought back.

While shooting footage for Season 2 in Madagascar in 2019, the team, along with primatologist and biologist Cortni Borgerson, found a non-fossilized skull and tusk that were conclusively identified as belonging to a Malagasy hippopotamus, an animal that was believed to have gone extinct 1,000 years ago. However, the skull was dated to less than 200 years old, confirming that the species survived much later than previously believed and may have even survived into the present day.

While shooting footage for Season 2 at Dong Mo Lake in Vietnam in 2019, the team, along with members of the Asian Turtle Program (ATP), captured footage of a Yangtze giant softshell turtle, a functionally extinct species with only three known surviving individuals, surfacing from the lake for a brief period. Although efforts to bring a surviving female of the species to the lake to possibly breed with the individual recorded in the episode failed due to her death in April 2019, the team hopes that their findings could contribute to a possible rescue of the species from extinction.

While shooting footage for Season 2 in Colombia, the team caught and collected confirmed DNA samples from multiple individuals, including juveniles, of the Rio Apaporis caiman, a subspecies of Spectacled caiman that had been believed to be extinct for over 30 years, suggesting that a healthy breeding population may exist in the area. In addition to the rediscovery of the animal, the DNA evidence collected shows that the Rio Apaporis caiman diverged from its closest relatives around 5 to 7 million years ago, which, when combined with several unique morphological features (blotchy yellow pattern, elongated snout, etc.), suggests that the animal is actually its own separate species of caiman instead of a subspecies. Forrest Galante is currently working on a paper to describe the Rio Apaporis caiman as its own unique species. A Colombian scientist named Sergio Balaguera-Reina had rediscovered the caiman prior to Galante's excursion and published a paper on it in 2019. Balaguera-Reina further disputes the claim that the caiman was believed to be extinct, saying, "We never thought that this caiman was extinct. But the political situation in Colombia prevented biologists from safely accessing the animal’s habitat to confirm that it’s still there." Galante credited Balaguera-Reina for his independent discovery after the episode's airing.

While shooting footage for "Land of the Lost Sharks" in South Africa with shark expert Dave Ebert, the team caught and collected three lost shark species; the first was a Whitetip weasel shark, found on footage captured on an underwater camera trap. The Ornate sleeper-ray was found by footage captured by a South African dive master Adrian Peartan, who filmed it on a night dive, while it was feeding. Late at night Forrest and Dave managed to reel in a Flapnose houndshark, a species not seen since 1902, tag it with a GPS tracker and release it back into the ocean to study its movement patterns, revealing its very restricted range.

== Episodes ==
Season	Episodes	Originally released	
Season	Episodes	First released	Last released
1	8	June 10, 2018	July 29, 2018
2	10	October 23, 2019	December 18, 2019

=== Season 1 (2018) ===
No. overall	No. in season	Title	Original release date
1	1	"The Zanzibar Leopard"	June 10, 2018
Forrest sets out on a history-making expedition in Zanzibar, revealing species never filmed before; evidence leads to an unforgettable conclusion on the Zanzibar leopard, an animal declared extinct 25 years ago.
2	2	"Pachylemur: The Madagascar Giant"	June 17, 2018
recently discovered remains of Madagascar`s Pachylemur-red, furry giants nearly the size of great apes - disprove that they went extinct 1,000 years ago, Forrest scales the canopy of the jungle, new footage. Update: he reluctantly determined that reports of the Pachylemur's survival had been exaggerated due to misidentification of extant-but-rare red ruffed lemurs.
3	3	"The White Wolf of Newfoundland"	June 24, 2018
Forrest teams up with a specialist in Newfoundland in search of a predator that was declared extinct in 1930; the duo meets with a hunter that shot what is believed to be a wolf; new footage.
4	4	"Florida black wolf"	July 1, 2018
Forrest combs the Florida Everglades for a predator rumored to exist for years, the Florida black wolf; featuring new footage from Forrest`s expeditions.
5	5	"The Javan Tiger"	July 8, 2018
Forrest delves into the vibrant island of Java in Indonesia, in an attempt to find the Javan tiger, an exotic predator declared extinct in 2003, but recently sighted; new footage.
6	6	"The Tasmanian Tiger Down Under"	July 15, 2018
After numerous, credible eyewitness accounts of the Tasmanian tiger in Australia, Forrest joins JCU researchers in their study before heading back into the Cape York Peninsula; featuring new footage from Forrest`s expeditions.e:
7	7	"Formosan Clouded Leopard"	July 22, 2018
Forrest tracks the Formosan clouded leopard, which has been declared extinct; he treks deep into the jungles of Taiwan where a run-in with a predator may solve the mystery; with bonus footage. Update: he reluctantly concluded at the end of the episode that this species is definitely extinct.
8	8	"The Dodo of the North"	July 29, 2018
Forrest travels to the Faroe Islands to look for any trace of the great auk. his passionate search for a large flightless seabird takes him through scenic and rugged terrain.

=== Season 2 (2019) ===
No. overall	No. in season	Title	Original release date
9	1	"The Galapagos Giant"	October 23, 2019
Forrest is in the Galápagos seeking the Fernandina Island tortoise, an animal that was only seen once, over 100 years ago. The clues are here, along with an abundance of incredibly unique species, raising hopes of a historic discovery.
10	2	"The Dracula Monkey of Borneo"	October 30, 2019
Forrest returns to the volcanic islands of Indonesia to find the Miller's langur, otherwise known as the "Dracula monkey". When locals inform him of an illegal pet market, his search quickly evolves into a rescue mission.
11	3	"The Legendary Cape lion"	November 6, 2019
Forrest ventures home to Zimbabwe in search of the mysterious Cape lion -- a massive black-maned predator. He and the crew navigate the African bush determined to get DNA proof, facing threats of charging rhinos and huge prides of lions.
12	4	"The Caribbean Monk Seal"	November 13, 2019
Forrest sets off in a dangerous, shark-infested search for the extinct Caribbean monk seal. To prove its existence, he and the crew descend into deep waters, where they come face to face with a giant tiger shark.
13	5	"Madagascar Dwarf Hippo"	November 20, 2019
Known for being a pint-size version of its African cousin, the Malagasy dwarf hippo has been written off as extinct for 1000 years. Forrest and a local biologist trek through the bush of Madagascar to prove it still survives.
14	6	"The Hidden Turtle of Vietnam"	November 27, 2019
In Vietnam, Forrest teams up with a conservation group to save the largest turtle species in the world from extinction. Using cutting edge technology, they attempt to find a suitor for the last and only living Yangtze giant softshell turtle.
15	7	"Colombian Dinosaur"	December 4, 2019
Deep in the jungles of Colombia, Forrest is on a mission to prove the Rio Apaporis caiman still exists. Locals believe this crocodilian resides within a lawless land inhabited by guerrilla rebels, kidnappers, and deadly predators.
16	8	"Ivory Billed Woodpecker of the Bayou"	December 11, 2019
Forrest is determined to find out if the famously reclusive ivory-billed woodpecker still exists. The alligator and poisonous snake infested swamps of Louisiana make for a challenging mission, but he is prepared for anything.
17	9	"The Asian Unicorn"	December 18, 2019
In Vietnam, Forrest treks through the world's largest cave searching for the saola in a hidden oasis. This exotic species was only recently discovered, but rumors swirl that "The Asian Unicorn" might already be extinct.
18	10	"Southern Rocky Mountain Wolf"	December 18, 2019
The Southern Rocky Mountain wolf hasn't been seen in almost 80 years, but recent cattle attacks spark the possibility that it still exists. Trekking high into the Sierras, Forrest is determined to bring it out of hiding.

=== Specials ===
Title	Original release date
"The Tasmanian Tiger"	May 31, 2016
The ferocious Tasmanian tiger was declared extinct 80 years ago, yet sightings are still reported. A trio of experts venture into Tasmania's undeveloped wilderness in search of one of the most unique and terrifying predators ever to walk the earth.
"The Pondicherry Shark"	July 31, 2019
Forrest Galante heads to the Maldives to find the supposedly extinct Pondicherry shark - a rare species last seen in the 1970s. Unidentified sharks in the area have led many to believe it's alive and Forrest is determined to prove it's not extinct. Broadcast as part of Shark Week 2019.
"Operation Croc Rescue"	May 5, 2020
Animal expert Forrest Galante takes a break from his mission of finding extinct animals to rescue a giant crocodile with a motorcycle tire trapped around its neck, traveling to Indonesia in hopes of saving its life.
"Land of the Lost Sharks"	August 11, 2020
Forrest Galante dives into some of the most treacherous, shark-infested waters of the Eastern coast of South Africa in an attempt to rediscover three unique cartilaginous fishes lost to science. These species are the Whitetip weasel shark, known from only one specimen caught in 1984; the Ornate sleeper-ray, an electric ray only described in 2007; and the Flapnose houndshark, which has not been sighted since 1902. Broadcast as part of Shark Week 2020.
"Jaws of Alaska"	July 16, 2021
International wildlife biologist Forrest Galante and Jessica Evans travel the world in search of rare and elusive wildlife, including those lost to science, and mysterious cold-water sharks.

== Cancelled episode ==
An episode was planned in 2019 in which Galante and his team would search for the possibly extinct baiji and the extinct Chinese paddlefish in the Yangtze river of China. However, they were denied access into the country for filming purposes.
