= Hippopotamus laloumena =

Hippopotamus laloumena Temporal range: Pleistocene - Holocene

Conservation status
- Extinct

Scientific classification
- Kingdom: Animalia
- Phylum: Chordata
- Class: Mammalia
- Infraclass: Placentalia
- Order: Artiodactyla
- Family: Hippopotamidae
- Genus: Hippopotamus
- Species: †H. laloumena

Binomial name
- †Hippopotamus laloumena Faure and Guerin, 1990

Extinct species of mammal

Hippopotamus laloumena is an extinct species of hippopotamus from Pleistocene and Holocene Madagascar, making it the oldest of Malagasy hippopotamus. H. laloumena was much larger than other Malagasy hippopotamus, but was still somewhat smaller than the common hippopotamus (H. amphibius). However, little is known about the species because it was identified with only a lower jaw and limb bones. It was described in 1990 by French palaeontologists M. Faure and Guerin, the fossils recovered from a site near Mananjary on the east coast of Madagascar. The species name derives from Malagasy laloumena "hippopotamus".

Radiocarbon dating of H. laloumena remains returned dates both before definitive human occupation of Madagascar (2364–2212 BP), and after European contact (1670–1950 and 1639–1945 AD), with a mandible possibly belonging to this species dating to c. 1600. However, the latter were taken from a skull of dubious provenance and importation from mainland Africa cannot be excluded. Nevertheless, ethnographic data collected in Belo sur Mer include putative eyewitness accounts of a hippo-like animal as recently as 1976.

While clearly different from Madagascar's other two recent hippopotamuses (H. lemerlei and H. madagascariensis), the relationship between H. laloumena and the common hippopotamus is not fully resolved. It is possible H. laloumena is merely the result of common hippos sporadically crossing from East Africa to Madagascar during the Quaternary; if true, this would make H. laloumena a junior synonym of H. amphibius.

Fossils of H. laloumena have been excavated from west and east coasts, and overlap with ranges of other Malagasy hippopotamuses.

== See also ==
- Hippopotamus lemerlei
- Hippopotamus madagascariensis
