= Forrest Galante =

American television presenter (born 1988)

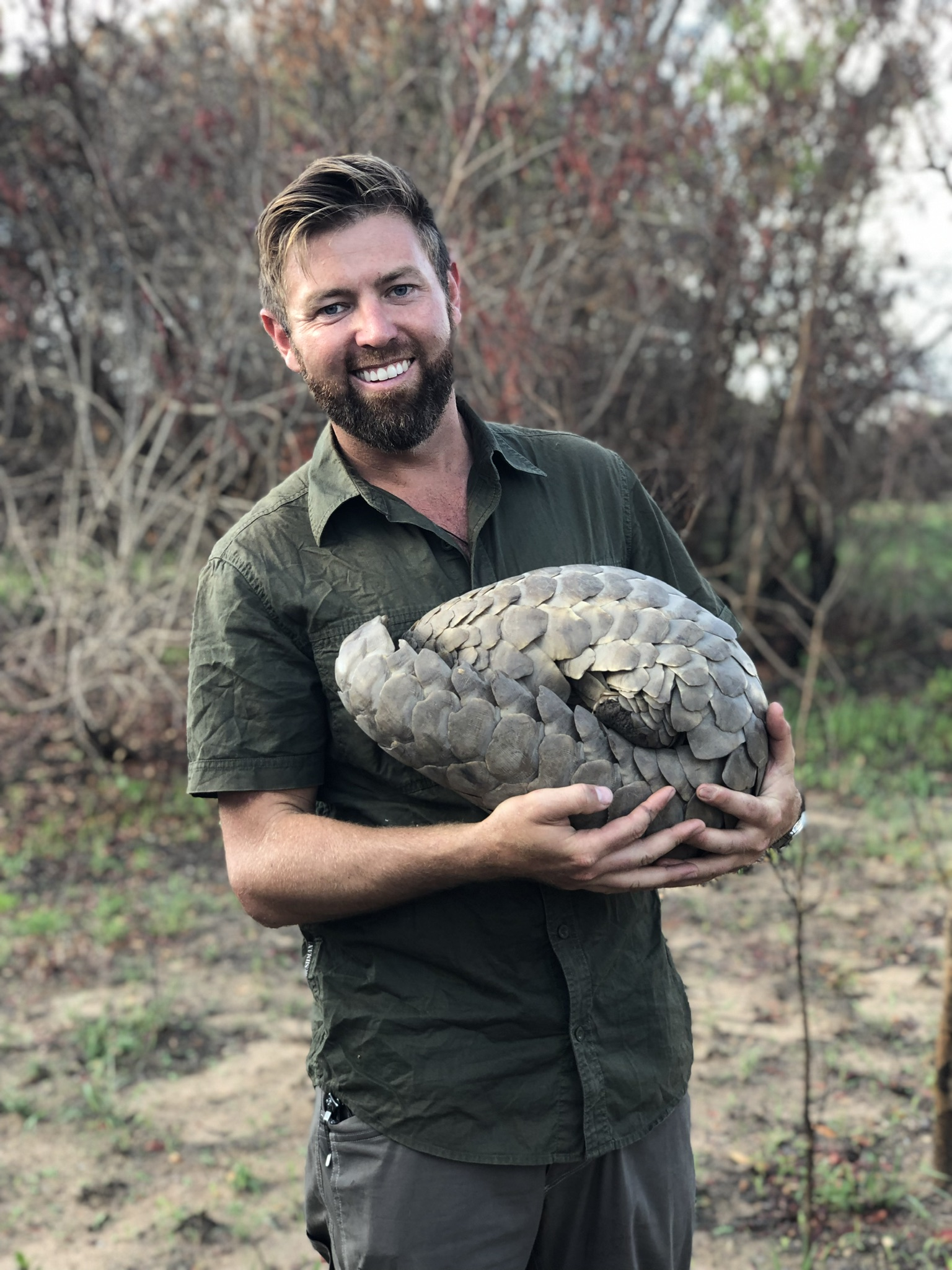
- Galante with a pangolin in 2018
- Born: March 31, 1988 (age 38); California, U.S.
- Education: University of California at Santa Barbara
- Occupation: Television host
- Known for: Extinct or Alive on Animal Planet
- Website: forrestgalante.com

Forrest Galante (born March 31, 1988) is an American outdoor adventurer and television personality. He primarily seeks out animals on the brink of extinction. He is the host of the television shows Extinct or Alive and Mysterious Creatures with Forrest Galante on Animal Planet, and has appeared on multiple Shark Week shows.

== Early and personal life ==
Forrest Galante was born on March 31, 1988 to an English-Jewish family. Shortly after his birth in California, Galante and his family moved to Harare, Zimbabwe, where his mother ran a safari business. He and his sister were raised on a farm. Throughout his youth, Galante spent time exploring the African bush, learning to wrangle snakes, trap small animals, and snorkel the reefs of the Bazaruto Archipelago in Mozambique. In Zimbabwe, he attended an English boarding school and headed up the Junior Herpetology Society, studying native flora and fauna.

In 2001, following Robert Mugabe's violent political uprising in Zimbabwe, the Galante family farm was invaded and burnt, leading the family to flee to California. He resumed his education in Santa Barbara, where he graduated from high school and later earned a degree in biology from the University of California, Santa Barbara.

Galante married science teacher Jessica Evans in 2015. The couple has two sons.

== Career ==
In 2013, Galante made his first foray into television with an appearance on the Discovery Channel's Naked and Afraid, where he participated in the show's 21-day survival challenge. He completed the challenge—being dropped with a stranger in the remote section of northwestern Panama—and scored a primitive survival rating of 8.8, one of the highest in the show's history.

In 2016, Galante and his photographer wore special suits developed in Auckland, New Zealand, that mimicked a crocodile's scaly skin to aid in their study of American crocodiles in Central America. The suits blocked their bodies' electric currents, allowing them to swim alongside and capture the reptile's natural behavior. The duo came within inches of the crocodiles, filming them in their authentic habitat for their film Dancing with Dragons.

On June 10, 2018, Galante's docuseries, Extinct or Alive premiered on Animal Planet. Galante has stated that he is committed to uncovering the Thylacine and, after two expeditions, would continue searching.

Galante produced the History channel show Face the Beast, wherein two men attempt to retrace the steps of predators going on unexplained killing rampages against humans. He has appeared in the GQ: The Breakdown video series.

In 2019, he testified in front of the United States Congress to promote legislative changes and increased funding for conservation.

His first book, Still Alive: A Wild Life of Rediscovery, was published in June 2021 by Hachette Books, and is described by the publisher as "part memoir, part biological adventure". In this book, Galante discusses his passion for bringing attention and research funding for preservation of ecosystems.

In 2023, Galante serves as an advisory board member for Colossal Biosciences, a company that is seeking to genetically engineer extinct species such as the woolly mammoth and dodo back into existence to repair human-caused holes in world ecosystems.

=== Expeditions ===
In his search for unique wildlife, Galante has visited over 60 countries.

During filming for Extinct or Alive in 2018, a camera trap caught apparent footage of a Zanzibar leopard on Unguja Island. The animal appeared smaller than specimens from the mainland, and seemed to have smaller, more solid spots than normally seen on African leopards. Further investigations are planned to confirm whether or not this is a Zanzibar leopard, and whether a viable population still exists.

While shooting footage for season two on the remote Galápagos Islands in February 2019, biologist Washington Tapia-Aguilera, four Ecuadorian park rangers, and Galante's team discovered a single female Fernandina Island Galápagos tortoise, which had been presumed extinct since 1906. Trace evidence found on the expedition indicated that more individuals likely exist in the wild, and new searches were being planned to find a male Fernandina Tortoise that could potentially save the species. Galante and his team claimed the discovery, but this has been disputed by Tapia-Aguilera.

== Criticism ==
Galante has been accused of claiming credit for discoveries previously made by scientists, and has been derided as a "parachute scientist", a practice described as "colonial" and exploitative of scientists in developing countries.

Galante's claim to have rediscovered the Fernandina Island tortoise in 2019 was disputed by Washington Tapia-Aguilera, a biologist at the Galapagos Conservancy and director of the Giant Tortoise Restoration Initiative. Tapia-Aguilera said that he actually decided where to look for the tortoise, and that "Ecuadorian park ranger Jeffreys Málaga was the one that knew the land, tracked the tortoise, and ultimately made the discovery before calling over the rest of the team."

His claim of rediscovering the Rio Apaporis caiman was also contradicted by a Journal of Herpetology article written by Sergio A. Balaguera-Reina, a biologist at the Universidad de Ibagué and Texas Tech University.
