= Lake Ihotry =

Lake in Madagascar

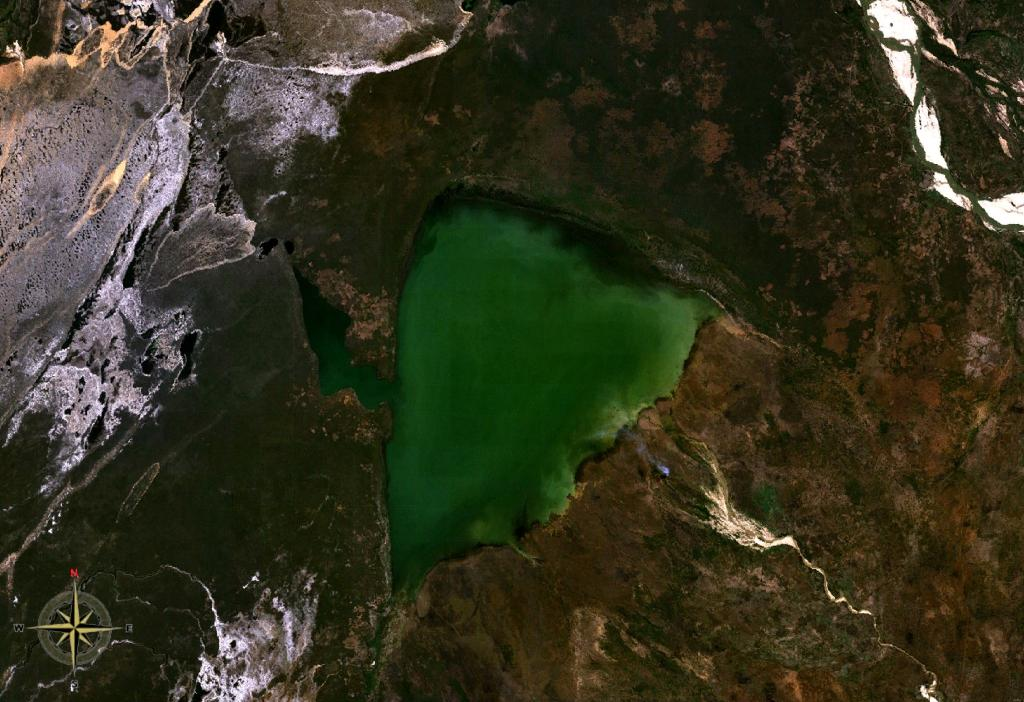
- seen from space

- Location within Madagascar
- Location: Atsimo-Andrefana
- Coordinates: 21°55′0″S 43°40′0″E
- Basin countries: Madagascar
- Surface area: 96–112 km^{2} (37–43 sq mi)
- Max. depth: 3.8 m (12 ft)
- Water volume: approx. 0.395 km^{3} (320,000 acre⋅ft)
- Surface elevation: 50 m (160 ft)

Lake Ihotry is the second largest lake of Madagascar. It is a closed saline lake in semi-arid southwestern part of Madagascar in the region of Atsimo-Andrefana. Its area varies seasonally, from 96 km^{2} to 112 km^{2}.

== Roads ==
It can be reached by the RN9 from Toliara (Tulear) to Mandabe.

== Other sources ==
- BirdLife
- Geophysical Research document
