= Archaeopotamus =

Archaeopotamus Temporal range: Late Miocene to Late Pliocene

Scientific classification
- Kingdom: Animalia
- Phylum: Chordata
- Class: Mammalia
- Infraclass: Placentalia
- Order: Artiodactyla
- Family: Hippopotamidae
- Subfamily: Hippopotaminae
- Genus: †Archaeopotamus; Boisserie, 2005

Species
- †A. pantanelli (Joleaud 1920) †A. harvardi (Coryndon 1977) †A. lothagamensis (Weston 2000) †A. qeshta (Boisserie et al. 2017)

Extinct genus of mammals

Archaeopotamus is an extinct genus of Hippopotamidae that lived between 7.5 and 2.58 million years ago in Africa and the Middle East. The genus was described in 2005 to encompass species of hippos that were previously grouped in Hexaprotodon.

The genus name Archaeopotamus comes from Ancient Greek ἀρχαῖος (arkhaîos), meaning "ancient", and ποταμός (potamós), meaning "river", and thus, "the ancient of the river". Of all identified hippos, only Kenyapotamus is older. Kenyapotamus, however, is only known from partial fossils; Archaeopotamus is the oldest well-identified hippo.

== Characteristics ==
Many prehistoric hippo fossils are known primarily through fossils of the lower jaw. Archaeopotamus, like Hexaprotodon, has three pairs of incisors. Unlike Hexaprotodon, Archaeopotamus has a highly elongate mandibular symphysis. The informal name "narrow-muzzled hippos" has been suggested for this genus.

=== A. lothagamensis ===
A. lothagamensis is a species whose fossils were discovered at Lothagam, a site southwest of Lake Turkana in Kenya and first described in 2000. When first described, the species was classified as Hexaprotodon lothagamensis, although the significant morphological differences from other Hexaprotodon species were noted.

A. lothagamensis was smaller than the modern hippopotamus and also smaller than A. harvardi and with a more slender skeleton. It was, however, significantly larger than the modern pygmy hippopotamus.

=== A. harvardi ===
A. harvardi is a species of hippo first described in 1977, originally as Hexaprotodon harvardi. Although the proportions of A. harvardi and A. lothagamensis are similar, the former species is significantly smaller. Femurs of A. harvardi are approximately the same size as those of the modern hippopotamus.

Another group of fossils, originally described as Hexaprotodon sahabiensis or the Abu Dhabi Hippopotamus, are now considered to belong to A. harvardi or A. lothagamensis. The fossil record for A. harvardi is more extensive than for other Archaeopotamus.

A. harvardi is believed to have had a more riparian lifestyle than A. lothagamensis.

== Distribution ==
Fossils of Archaeopotamus have been unearthed near Lake Turkana, Kenya; near Lake Victoria in Kenya and in Abu Dhabi and thus likely ranged across East Africa and the Arabian Peninsula. The species A. pantanelli inhabited Tuscany, Italy.

== Evolution ==
The immediate ancestor of Archaeopotamus is unknown. Whether Archaeopotamus is descended from Kenyapotamus cannot be determined from the few fossils available. Although Archaeopotamus is more primitive than any member of the genus Hippopotamus, it is likely a sister group of both hippopotamuses and Hexaprotodon.

Fossils similar to Archaeopotamus have been dated to as recently as about 2 million years ago, the end of the Pliocene epoch. These fossils are significantly different from those of Hippopotamus and Hexaprotodon of the same time.
