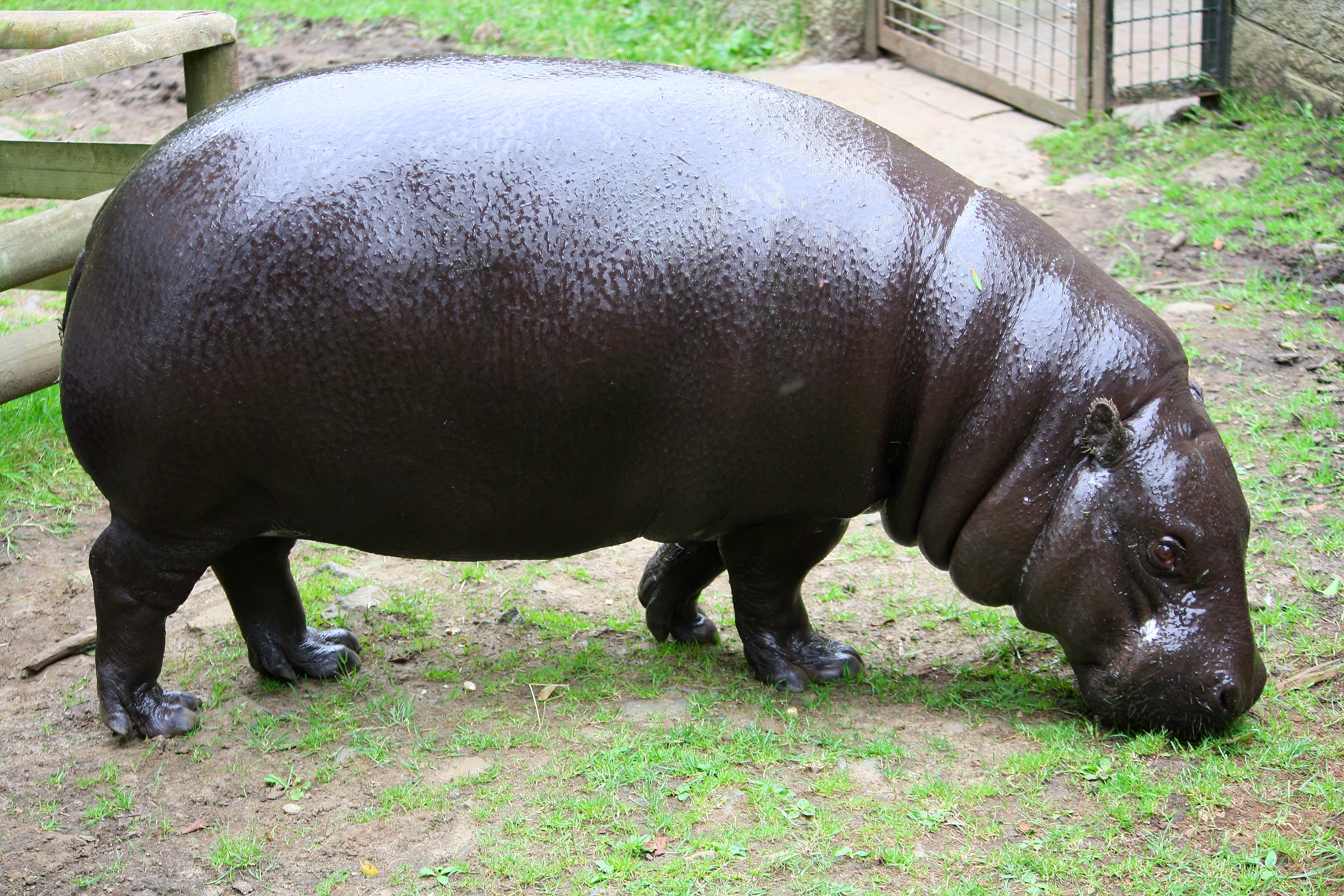
- At Edinburgh Zoo

Conservation status
- Endangered (IUCN 3.1)
- CITES Appendix II

Scientific classification
- Kingdom: Animalia
- Phylum: Chordata
- Class: Mammalia
- Order: Artiodactyla
- Family: Hippopotamidae
- Subfamily: Hippopotaminae
- Genus: Choeropsis; Leidy, 1853
- Species: C. liberiensis

Binomial name
- Choeropsis liberiensis (Morton, 1849)

Subspecies
- C. l. liberiensis; C. l. heslopi
- Range map

Synonyms
- Hexaprotodon liberiensis

= Pygmy hippopotamus =

Species of semi-aquatic mammal

The pygmy hippopotamus or pygmy hippo (Choeropsis liberiensis) is a small hippopotamid which is native to the forests and swamps of West Africa, primarily in Liberia, with small populations in Sierra Leone, Guinea, and Ivory Coast. It has been extirpated from Nigeria and possibly Guinea-Bissau.

The pygmy hippopotamus is reclusive and nocturnal. It is one of only two extant species in the family Hippopotamidae, the other being its much larger relative, the common hippopotamus (Hippopotamus amphibius) or Nile hippopotamus. The pygmy hippopotamus displays many terrestrial adaptations, but like the common hippopotamus, it is semiaquatic and relies on water to keep its skin moist and its body temperature cool. Behaviors such as mating and giving birth may occur in water or on land. The pygmy hippopotamus is herbivorous, feeding on ferns, broad-leaved plants, grasses, and fruits it finds in the forests.

A rare nocturnal forest creature, the pygmy hippopotamus is a difficult animal to study in the wild. Pygmy hippos were unknown outside West Africa until the 19th century. Introduced to zoos in the early 20th century, they breed well in captivity and the vast majority of research is derived from zoo specimens. The survival of the species in captivity is more assured than in the wild; in a 2015 assessment, the International Union for Conservation of Nature estimated that fewer than 2,500 pygmy hippos remain in the wild.

Pygmy hippos are primarily threatened by loss of habitat, as the forests are logged and converted to farm land, and are also vulnerable to poaching, hunting for bushmeat, natural predators and war. Pygmy hippos are among the species illegally hunted for food in Liberia.

== Taxonomy and origins ==
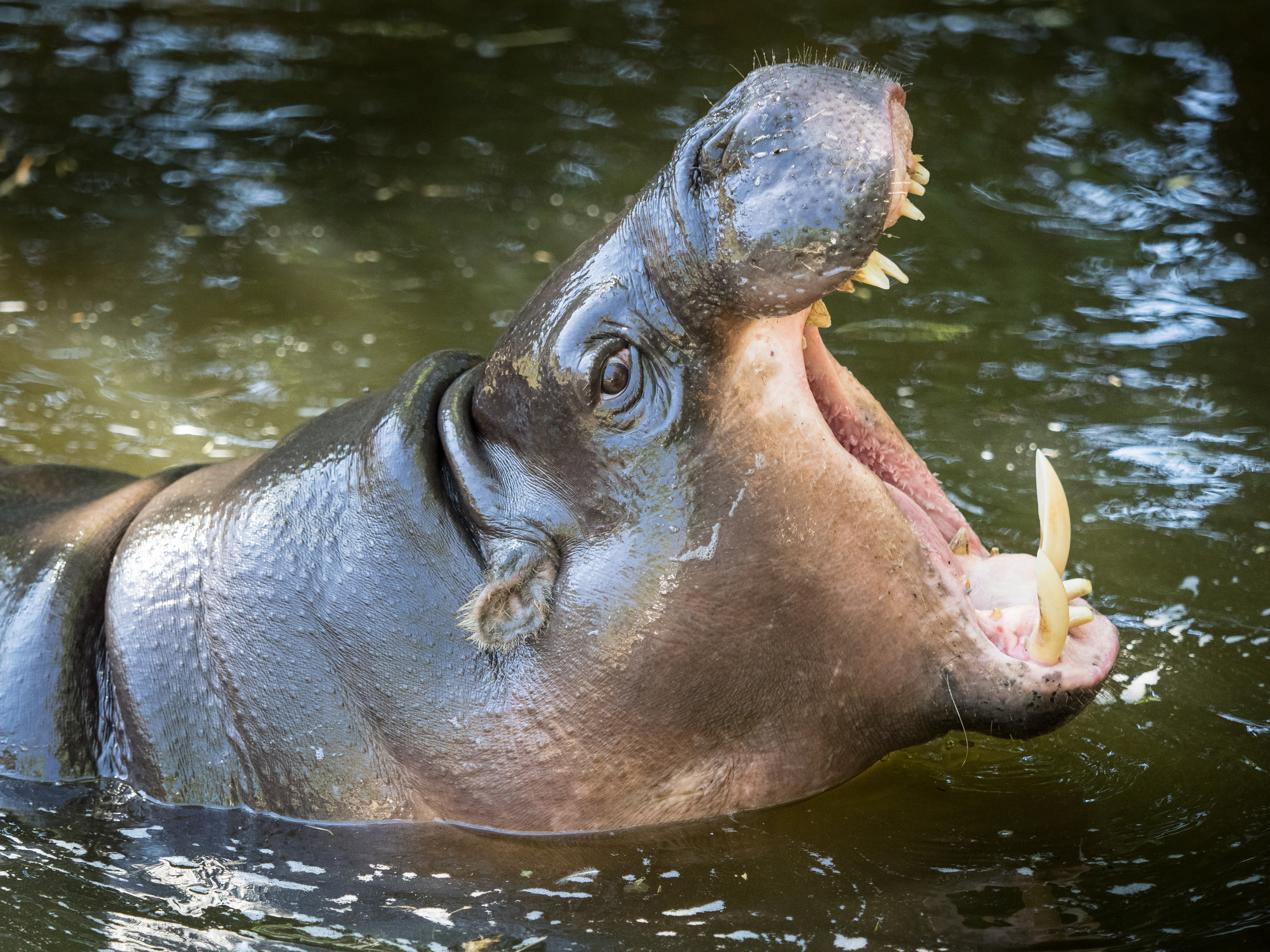
Showing its teeth at the Lagos Zoo in Portugal

Nomenclature of the pygmy hippopotamus reflects that of the hippopotamus; the plural form is pygmy hippopotamuses or pygmy hippopotami. A male pygmy hippopotamus is known as a bull, a female as a cow, and a baby as a calf. A group of hippopotami is known as a herd or a bloat.

The pygmy hippopotamus is a member of the family Hippopotamidae where it is classified as a member of the genus Choeropsis (from Ancient Greek χοῖρος (khoîros), meaning "pig", and ὄψις (ópsis), meaning "sight, resemblance"). Members of Hippopotamidae are sometimes known as hippopotamids. Sometimes the sub-family Hippopotaminae is used. Further, some taxonomists group hippopotami and anthracotheres in the superfamily Anthracotheroidea or Hippopotamoidea.

The taxonomy of the genus of the pygmy hippopotamus has changed as understanding of the animal has developed. Samuel G. Morton initially classified the animal as Hippopotamus minor, but later determined it was distinct enough to warrant its own genus, and labeled it Choeropsis. In 1977, Shirley C. Coryndon proposed that the pygmy hippopotamus was closely related to Hexaprotodon, a genus that consisted of prehistoric hippos mostly native to Asia.

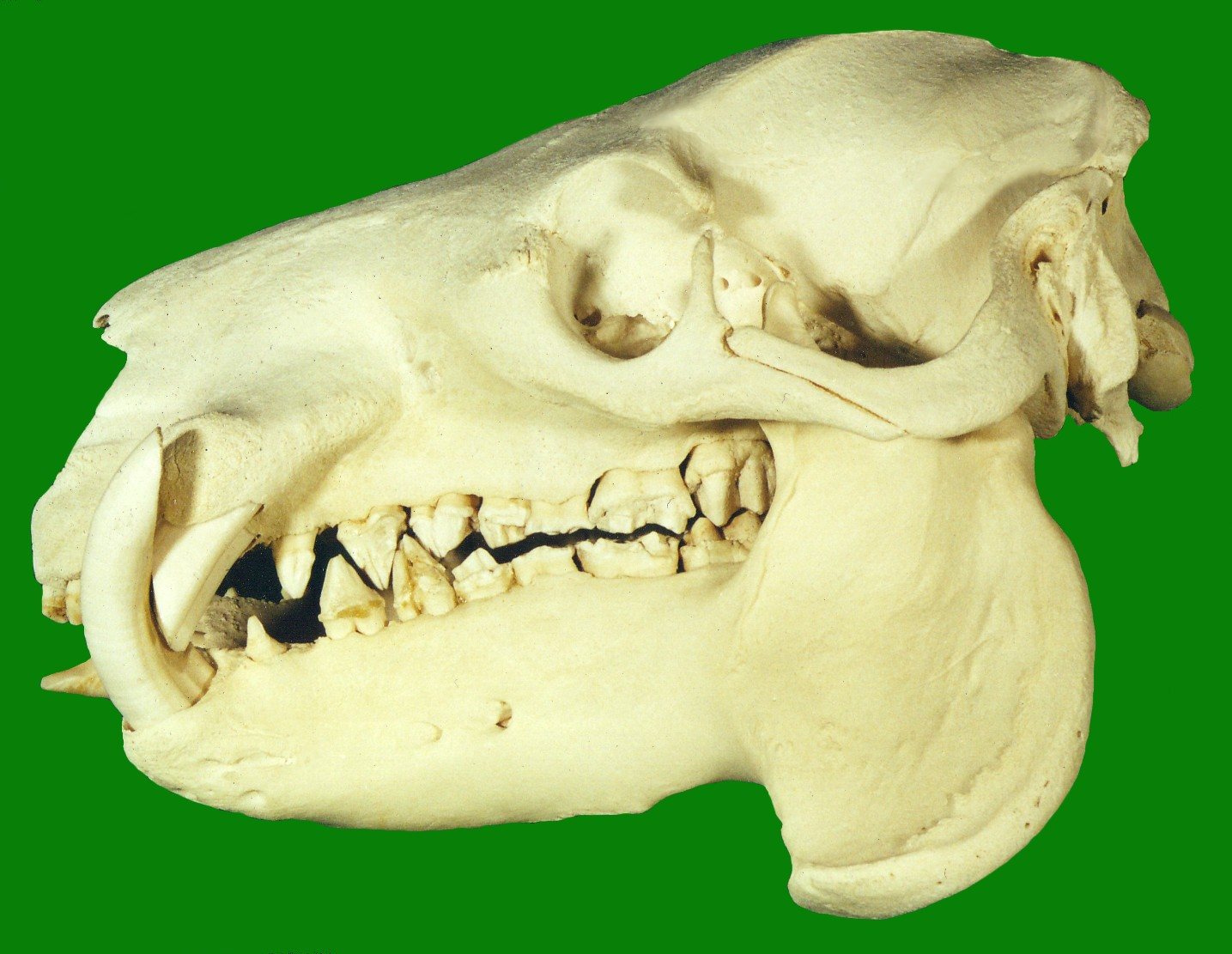
Skull

This assertion was widely accepted, until Boisserie asserted in 2005 that the pygmy hippopotamus was not a member of Hexaprotodon, after a thorough examination of the phylogeny of Hippopotamidae. He suggested instead that the pygmy hippopotamus was a distinct genus, and returned the animal to Choeropsis. ITIS verifies Hexaprotodon liberiensis as the valid scientific name. All agree that the modern pygmy hippopotamus, be it H. liberiensis or C. liberiensis, is the only extant member of its genus. The American Society of Mammalogists moved it back to Choeropsis in 2021, a move supported by the IUCN.

=== Nigerian subspecies ===
A distinct subspecies of pygmy hippopotamus existed in Nigeria until at least the 20th century, though the validity of this has been questioned. The existence of the subspecies, makes Choeropsis liberiensis liberiensis (or Hexaprotodon liberiensis liberiensis under the old classification) the full trinomial nomenclature for the Liberian pygmy hippopotamus. The Nigerian pygmy hippopotamus was never studied in the wild and never captured. All research and all zoo specimens are the Liberian subspecies. The Nigerian subspecies is classified as C. liberiensis heslopi.

The Nigerian pygmy hippopotamus ranged in the Niger River Delta, especially near Port Harcourt, but no reliable reports exist after the collection of the museum specimens secured by Ian Heslop, a British colonial officer, in the early 1940s. It is probably extinct. The subspecies is separated by over 1,800 km (1,100 mi) and the Dahomey Gap, a region of savanna that divides the forest regions of West Africa. The subspecies is named after Heslop, who shot three members of it in 1935 and 1943. He estimated that perhaps no more than 30 pygmy hippos remained in the region.

Heslop sent four pygmy hippopotamus skulls he collected to the British Museum of Natural History in London. These specimens were not subjected to taxonomic evaluation, however, until 1969 when Gordon Barclay Corbet classified the skulls as belonging to a separate subspecies based on consistent variations in the proportions of the skulls. The Nigerian pygmy hippos were seen or shot in Rivers State, Imo State and Bayelsa State, Nigeria. While some locals are aware that the species once existed, its history in the region is poorly documented.

=== Evolution ===
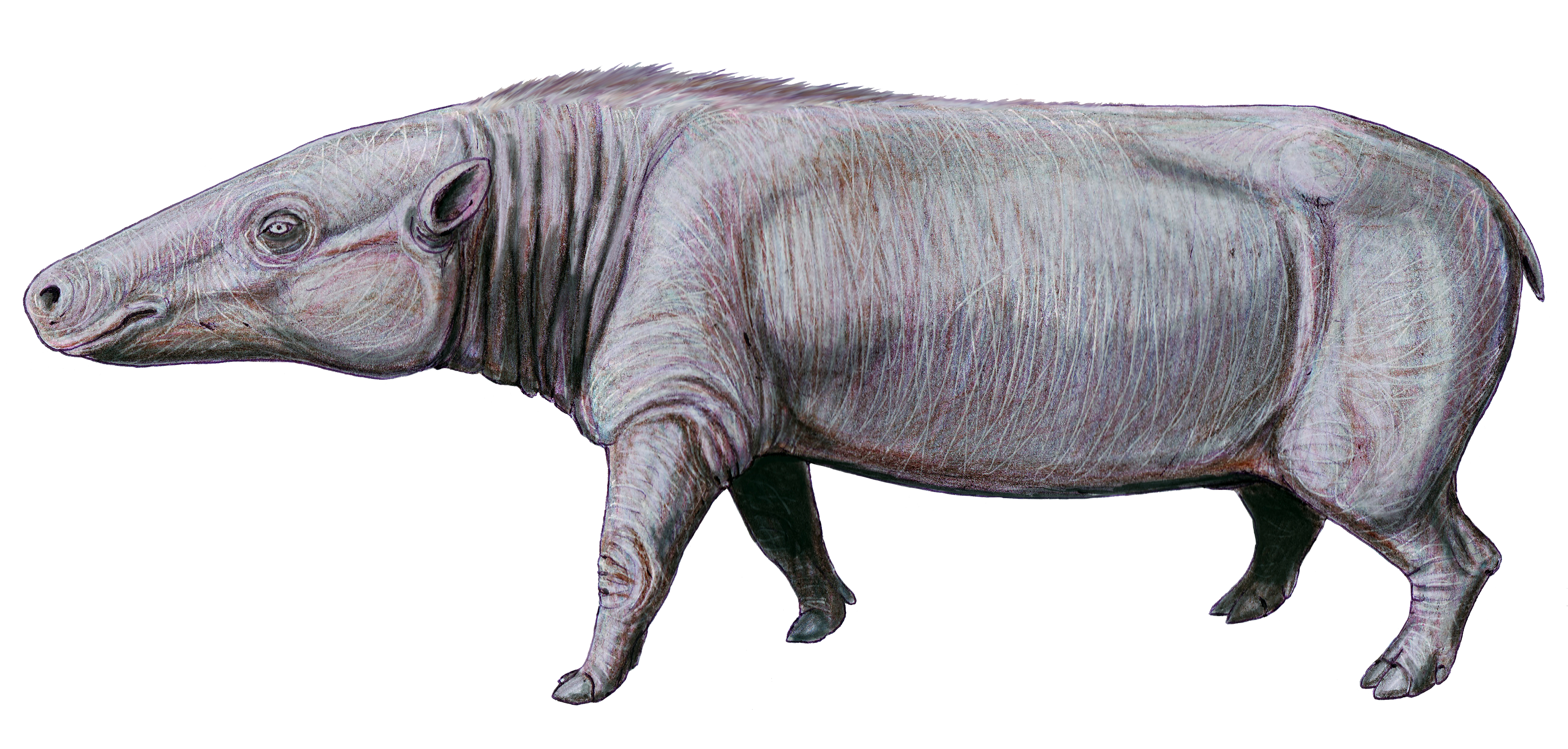
Anthracotheres like Anthracotherium resembled pygmy hippos and are among their likely ancestors.

The evolution of the pygmy hippopotamus is most often studied in the context of its larger cousin. Both species were long believed to be most closely related to the family Suidae (pigs and hogs) or Tayassuidae (peccaries), but later research near the end of the 20th century determined that hippos are most closely related to cetaceans (whales and dolphins). Hippos and whales shared a common semi-aquatic ancestor that branched off from other artiodactyls around 60 mya.

This hypothesized ancestor likely split into two branches about six million years later. One branch would evolve into cetaceans, the other branch became the anthracotheres, a large family of four-legged beasts, whose earliest member, from the Late Eocene, would have resembled narrow hippopotami with comparatively small and thin heads.

Hippopotamids are deeply nested within the family Anthracotheriidae. The oldest known hippopotamid is the genus Kenyapotamus, which lived in Africa from 16 to 8 mya. Kenyapotamus is known only through fragmentary fossils, but was similar in size to C. liberiensis. The Hippopotamidae are believed to have evolved in Africa, and while at one point the species spread across Asia and Europe, no hippopotami have ever been discovered in the Americas. Starting 7.5 to 1.8 mya the Archaeopotamus, likely ancestors to the genus Hippopotamus and Hexaprotodon, lived in Africa and the Middle East.

While the fossil record of hippos is still poorly understood, the lineages of the two modern genera, Hippopotamus and Choeropsis, may have diverged as far back as 8 mya. The ancestral form of the pygmy hippopotamus may be the genus Saotherium. Saotherium and Choeropsis are significantly more basal than Hippopotamus and Hexaprotodon, and thus more closely resemble the ancestral species of hippos.

=== Extinct pygmy and dwarf hippos ===
Several species of small hippopotamids have also become extinct in the Mediterranean in the late Pleistocene or early Holocene. Though these species are sometimes known as "pygmy hippopotami" they are not believed to be closely related to C. liberiensis. These include the Cretan dwarf hippopotamus (Hippopotamus creutzburgi), the Sicilian hippopotamus (Hippopotamus pentlandi), the Maltese hippopotamus (Hippopotamus melitensis) and the Cyprus dwarf hippopotamus (Hippopotamus minor).

These species, though comparable in size to the pygmy hippopotamus, are considered dwarf hippopotamuses, rather than pygmies. They are likely descended from a full-sized species of European hippopotamus, and reached their small size through the evolutionary process of insular dwarfism which is common on islands; the ancestors of pygmy hippopotami were also small and thus there was never a dwarfing process. There were also several species of pygmy hippopotamus on the island of Madagascar (see Malagasy hippopotamus).

== Description ==
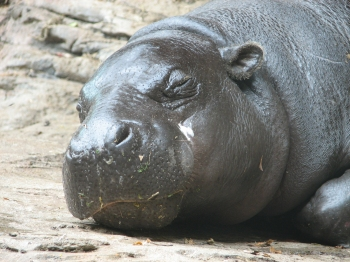
Resting at Louisville Zoo. The skull of a pygmy hippopotamus has less pronounced orbits and nostrils than a common hippopotamus.

Pygmy hippopotamuses share the same general form as a hippopotamus. They have a graviportal skeleton, with four stubby legs and four toes on each foot, supporting a portly frame. Yet, the pygmy is only half as tall as the hippopotamus and weighs less than 1/4 as much as its larger cousin. Adult pygmy hippos stand about 75–100 cm (2.46–3.28 ft) high at the shoulder, are 150–175 cm (4.92–5.74 ft) in length and weigh 180–275 kg (397–606 lb). Their lifespan in captivity ranges from 30 to 55 years, though it is unlikely that they live this long in the wild.

The skin is greenish-black or brown, shading to a creamy gray on the lower body. Their skin is very similar to the common hippo's, with a thin epidermis over a dermis that is several centimeters thick. Pygmy hippos have the same unusual secretion as common hippos, that gives a pinkish tinge to their bodies, and is sometimes described as "blood sweat" though the secretion is neither sweat nor blood. This substance, hipposudoric acid, is believed to have antiseptic and sunscreening properties. The skin of hippos dries out quickly and cracks, which is why both species spend so much time in water.

The skeleton of C. liberiensis is more gracile than that of the common hippopotamus, meaning their bones are proportionally thinner. The common hippo's spine is parallel with the ground; the pygmy hippo's back slopes forward, a likely adaptation to pass more easily through dense forest vegetation. Proportionally, the pygmy hippo's legs and neck are longer and its head smaller.

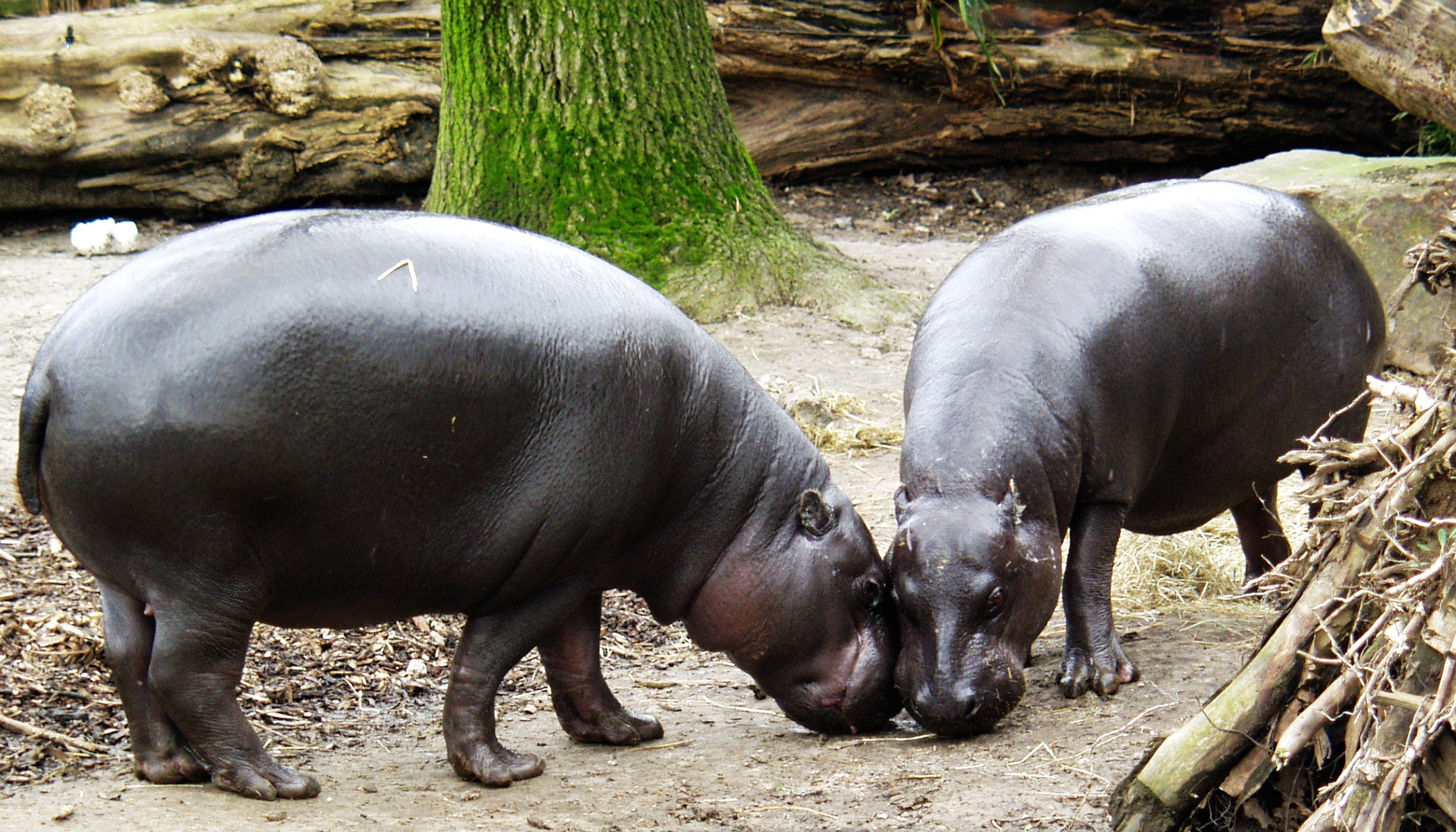
Nuzzling couple at the Duisburg Zoo in Germany

The orbits and nostrils of a pygmy hippopotamus are much less pronounced, an adaptation from spending less time in deep water (where pronounced orbits and nostrils help the common hippo breathe and see). The feet of pygmy hippos are narrower, but the toes are more spread out and have less webbing, to assist in walking on the forest floor.

Despite adaptations to a more terrestrial life than the common hippopotamus, pygmy hippos are still more aquatic than all other terrestrial even-toed ungulates. The ears and nostrils of pygmy hippos have strong muscular valves to aid submerging underwater, and the skin physiology is dependent on the availability of water.

== Behavior ==
(video) Bathing in the Ueno Zoo, Tokyo, Japan

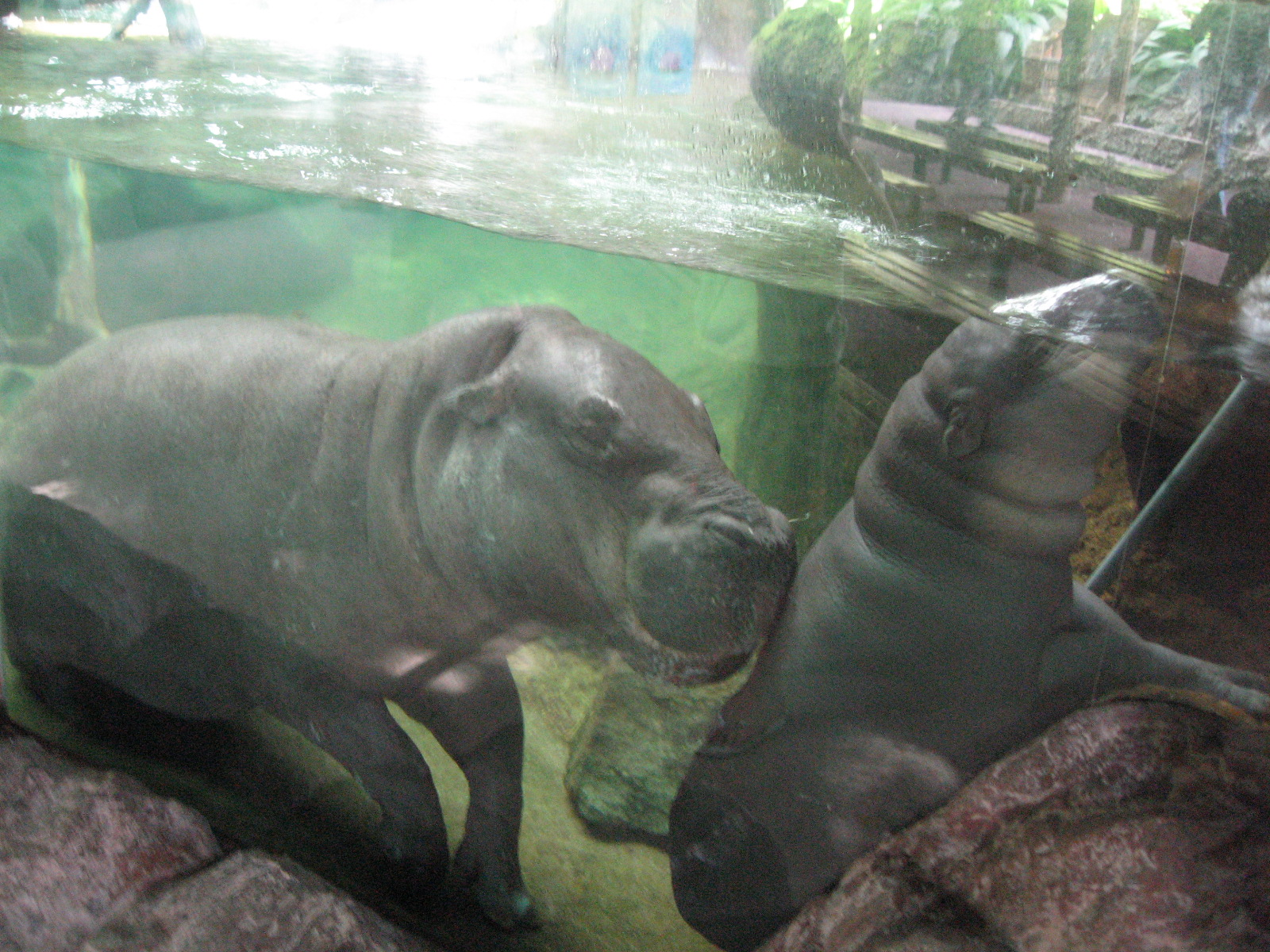
Two dive in water at Singapore Zoo, Singapore

The behavior of the pygmy hippopotamus differs from the common hippo in many ways. Much of its behavior is more similar to that of a tapir, though this is an effect of convergent evolution. While the common hippopotamus is gregarious, pygmy hippos live either alone or in small groups, typically a mated pair or a mother and calf. Pygmy hippos tend to ignore each other rather than fight when they meet. Field studies have estimated that male pygmy hippos range over 1.85 km^{2} (460 acres), while the range of a female is 0.4 to 0.6 km^{2} (100–150 acres). Pygmy hippos spend most of the day hidden in rivers. They will rest in the same spot for several days in a row, before moving to a new spot. At least some pygmy hippos make use of dens or burrows that form in river banks. It is unknown if the pygmy hippos help create these dens, or how common it is to use them. Though a pygmy hippopotamus has never been observed burrowing, other artiodactyls, such as warthogs, are burrowers.

=== Diet ===
Like the common hippopotamus, the pygmy hippopotamus emerges from the water at dusk to feed. It relies on game trails to travel through dense forest vegetation. It marks trails by vigorously waving its tail while defecating to further spread its feces. The pygmy hippopotamus spends about six hours a day foraging for food.

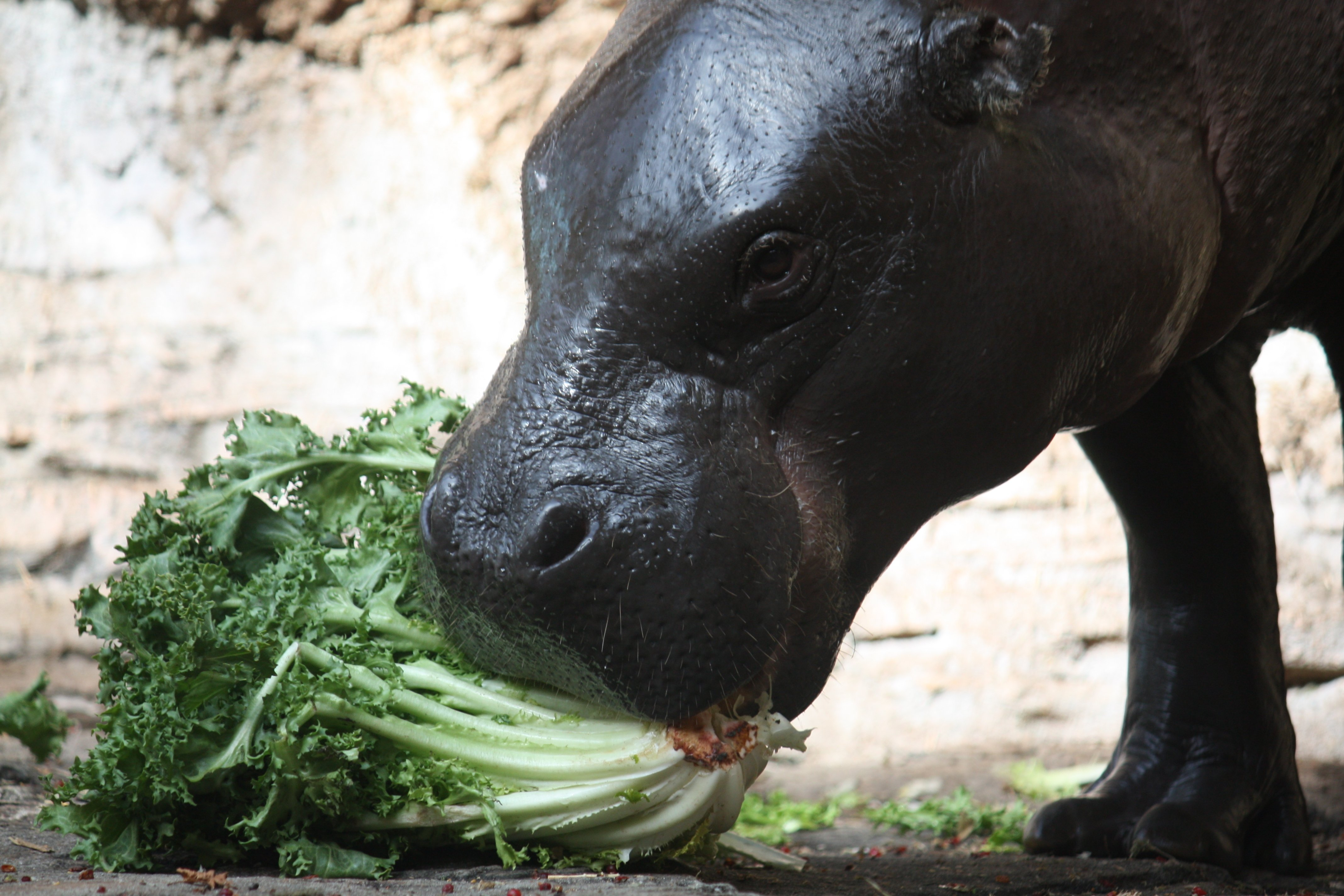
Eating a vegetable

Pygmy hippos are herbivorous. They do not eat aquatic vegetation to a significant extent and rarely eat grass because it is uncommon in the thick forests they inhabit. The bulk of a pygmy hippo's diet consists of herbs, ferns, broad-leaved plants, herbaceous shoots, forbs, sedges and fruits that have fallen to the forest floor. The wide variety of plants pygmy hippos have been observed eating suggests that they will eat any plants available. This diet is of higher quality than that of the common hippopotamus.

=== Reproduction ===
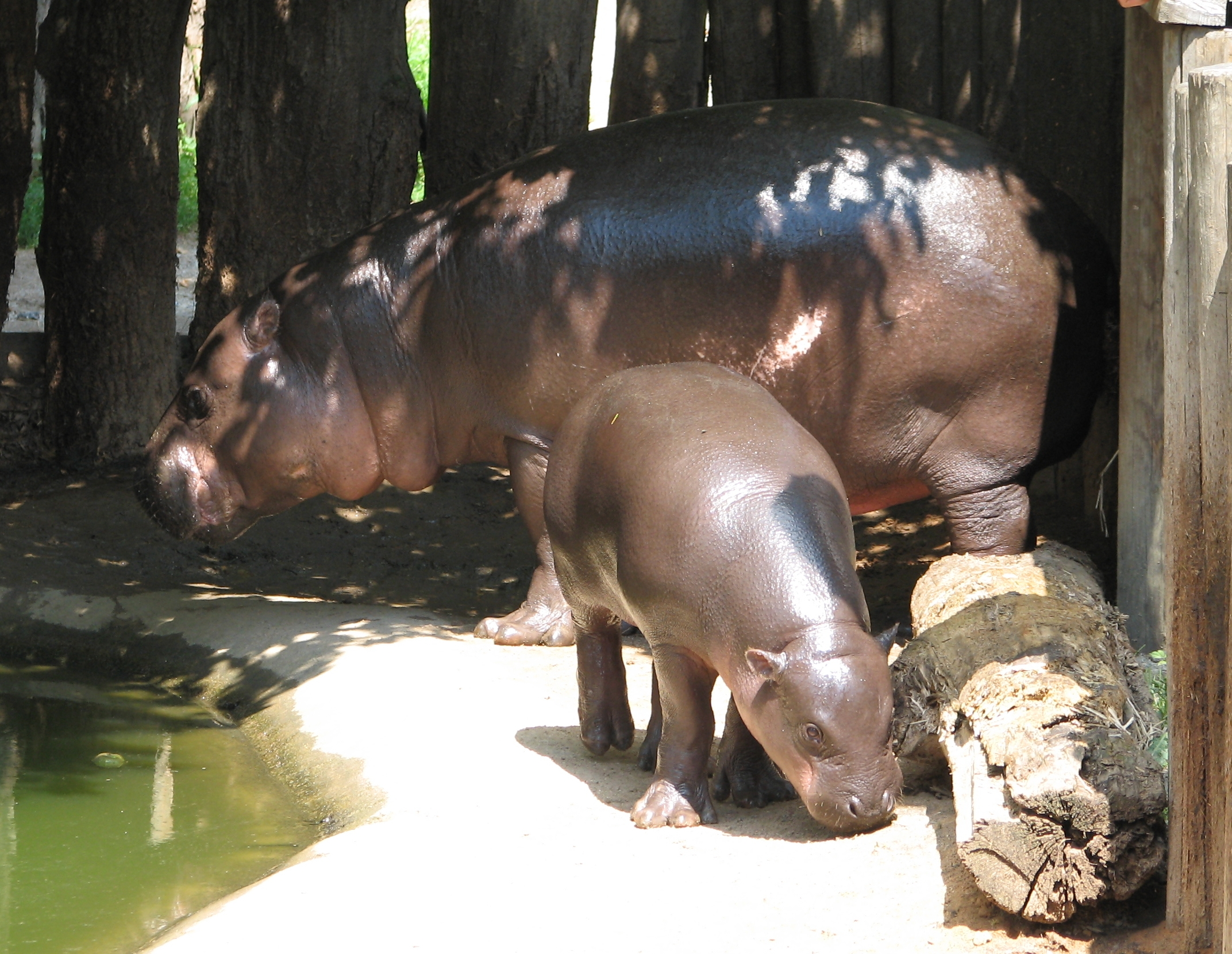
Baby stands near its parent in the Jihlava Zoo, Czechia.

A study of breeding behavior in the wild has never been conducted; the artificial conditions of captivity may cause the observed behavior of pygmy hippos in zoos to differ from natural conditions. Sexual maturity for the pygmy hippopotamus occurs between three and five years of age. The youngest reported age for giving birth is a pygmy hippopotamus in the Zoo Basel, Switzerland which bore a calf at three years and three months. The oestrus cycle of a female pygmy hippopotamus lasts an average of 35.5 days, with the oestrus itself lasting between 24 and 48 hours.

Pygmy hippopotamuses consort for mating, but the duration of the relationship is unknown. In zoos they breed as monogamous pairs. Copulation can take place on land or in the water, and a pair will mate one to four times during an oestrus period. In captivity, pygmy hippos have been conceived and born in all months of the year. The gestation period ranges from 190 to 210 days, and usually a single young is born, though twins are known to occur.

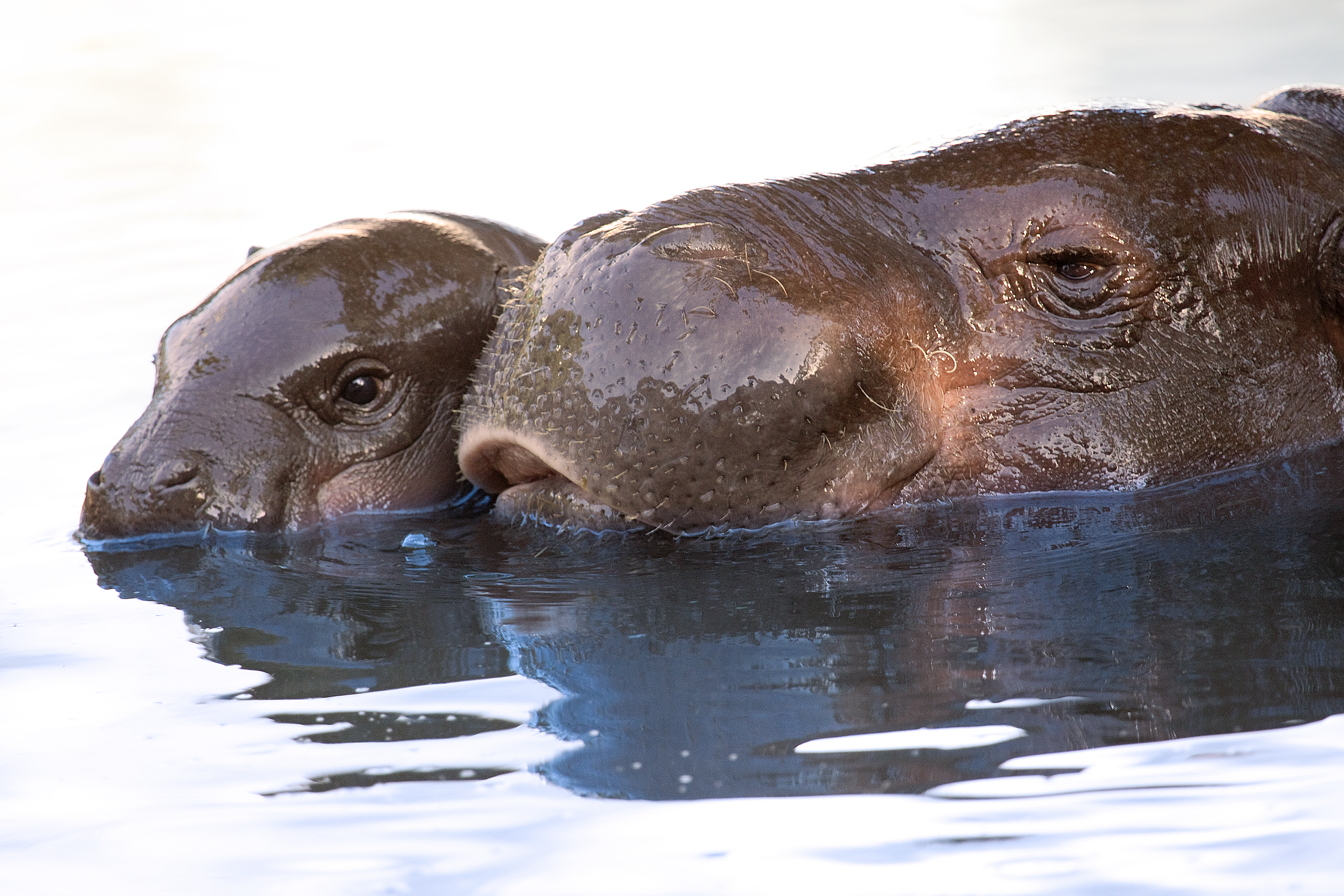
Mother and child taking a bath at Lisbon Zoo

The common hippopotamus gives birth and mates only in the water, but pygmy hippopotamuses mate and give birth on both land and water. Young pygmy hippos can swim almost immediately. At birth, pygmy hippos weigh 4.5–6.2 kg (9.9–13.7 lb) with males weighing about 0.25 kg (0.55 lb) more than females. Pygmy hippos are fully weaned between six and eight months of age; before weaning they do not accompany their mother when she leaves the water to forage, but instead hide in the water by themselves. The mother returns to the hiding spot about three times a day and calls out for the calf to suckle. Suckling occurs with the mother lying on her side.

=== Temperament ===
Although not considered dangerous to humans and generally docile, pygmy hippopotamuses can be highly aggressive at times. Although there have been no human deaths caused by pygmy hippos, there have been several attacks. While most of these were provoked by human behavior, several have had no apparent cause.

== Conservation ==
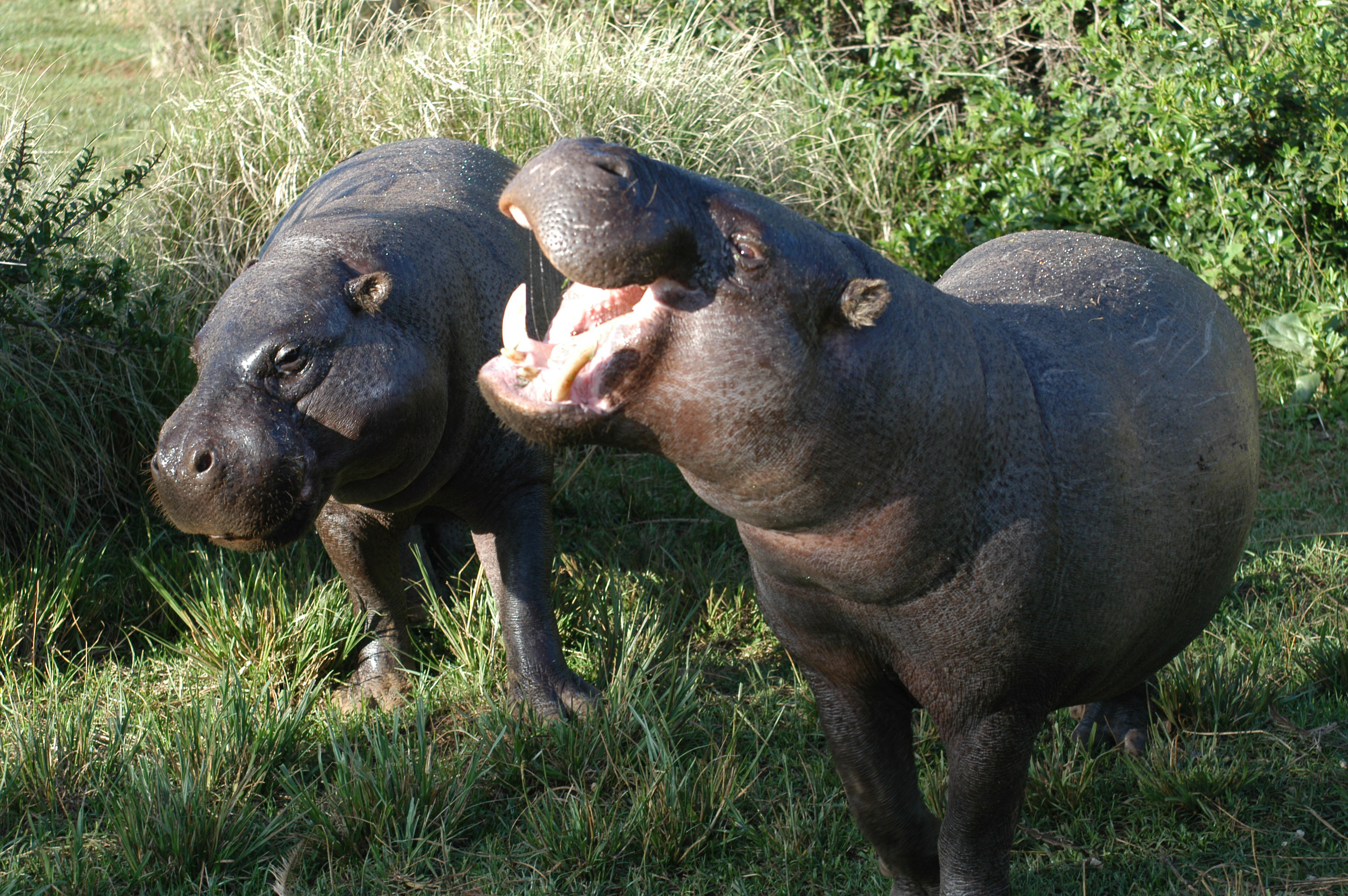
Pair at the Mount Kenya Wildlife Conservancy

The greatest threat to the remaining pygmy hippopotamus population in the wild is loss of habitat. The forests in which pygmy hippos live have been subject to logging, settling and conversion to agriculture, with little efforts made to make logging sustainable. As forests shrink, the populations become more fragmented, leading to less genetic diversity in the potential mating pool.

Pygmy hippos are among the species illegally hunted for food in Liberia. Their meat is said to be of excellent quality, like that of a wild boar; unlike those of the common hippo, the pygmy hippo's teeth have no value. The effects of West Africa's civil strife on the pygmy hippopotamus are unknown, but unlikely to be positive. Predators of young include leopards, Central African rock pythons and West African crocodiles. Very small juveniles and newborn calves may be at risk from African golden cats, honey badgers and African civets.

C. liberiensis was identified as one of the top 10 "focal species" in 2007 by the Evolutionarily Distinct and Globally Endangered (EDGE) project. Some populations inhabit protected areas, such as the Gola Forest Reserve in Sierra Leone.

Basel Zoo in Switzerland holds the international studbook and coordinates the entire captive pygmy hippopotamus population that freely breeds in zoos around the world. Between 1970 and 1991 the population of pygmy hippos born in captivity more than doubled. The survival of the species in zoos is more certain than the survival of the species in the wild. In captivity, the pygmy hippopotamus lives from 42 to 55 years, longer than in the wild. Since 1919, only 41 percent of pygmy hippos born in zoos have been male.

== History and folklore ==
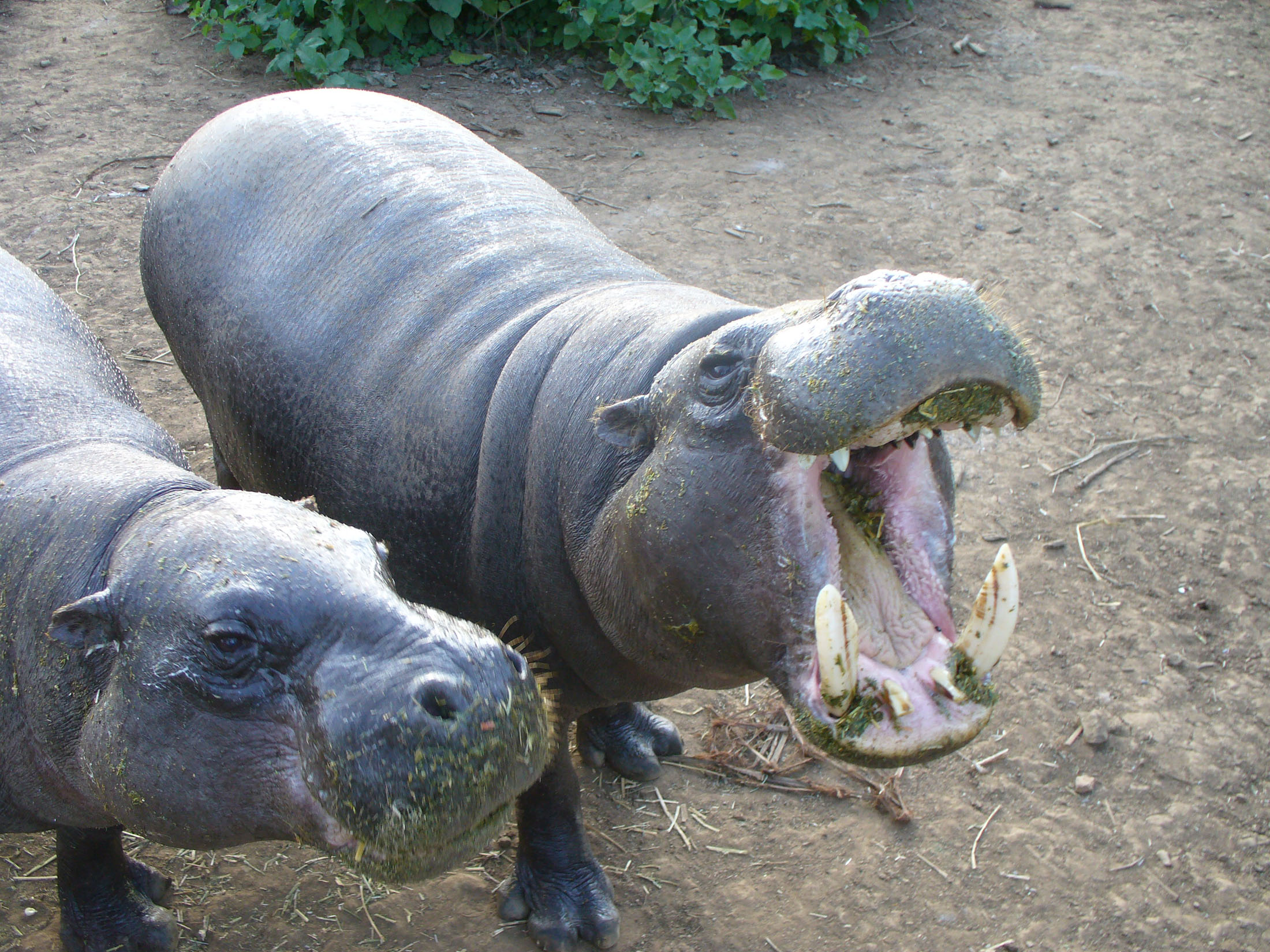
Pair at the Mount Kenya Wildlife Conservancy

While the common hippopotamus has been known to Europeans since classical antiquity, the pygmy hippopotamus was unknown outside its range in West Africa until the 19th century. Due to their nocturnal, forested existence, they were poorly known within their range as well. In Liberia the animal was traditionally known as a water cow.

Early field reports of the animal misidentified it as a wild hog. Several skulls of the species were sent to the American natural scientist Samuel G. Morton, during his residency in Monrovia, Liberia. Morton first described the species in 1843. The first complete specimens were collected as part of a comprehensive investigation of Liberian fauna in the 1870s and 1880s by Dr. Johann Büttikofer. The specimens were taken to the Natural History Museum in Leiden, The Netherlands.

The first pygmy hippopotamus was brought to Europe in 1873 after being captured in Sierra Leone by a member of the British Colonial Service but died shortly after arrival. Pygmy hippos were successfully established in European zoos in 1911. They were first shipped to Germany and then to the Bronx Zoo in New York City where they also thrived.

In 1927, Harvey Firestone of Firestone Tires presented Billy the pygmy hippo to U.S. President Calvin Coolidge. Coolidge donated Billy to the National Zoo in Washington, D.C. According to the zoo, Billy is a common ancestor to most pygmy hippos in U.S. zoos today.

Moo Deng is a pygmy hippopotamus living in Khao Kheow Open Zoo, in Thailand, who gained notability in September 2024 as a popular Internet meme after images of her went viral online. Because of the popularity of the hippo, whose name translates to "bouncy pork", the zoo saw a boosted attendance. It has been reported that some visitors to the zoo threw water and other objects at the baby hippo to get her to react.

Several folktales have been collected about the pygmy hippopotamus. One tale says that pygmy hippos carry a shining diamond in their mouths to help travel through thick forests at night; by day the pygmy hippopotamus has a secret hiding place for the diamond, but if a hunter catches a pygmy hippopotamus at night the diamond can be taken. Villagers sometimes believed that baby pygmy hippos do not nurse but rather lick secretions off the skin of the mother.

== See also ==
- List of individual hippos
