= Shirley Coryndon =

British paleontologist

Shirley Cameron Coryndon (1926–1976) was a British paleontologist and authority on fossil hippopotami.

In the 1950s she studied paleontology with Donald MacInnes at the Museum of Nairobi.

Coryndon was the paleontological assistant to Louis Leakey at the Centre for Prehistory and Paleontology. She also participated in excavations at Olduvai Gorge. She was previously married to Roger Coryndon, son of colonial administrator Robert Coryndon, and in 1969 she married British paleontologist R. J. G. Savage, whom she had met in Kenya in 1955. She is commemorated in the names of the fossil hippopotami Hexaprotodon coryndonae and Kenyapotamus coryndonae, as well as the fossil bovine Ugandax coryndonae.

== Books ==
- Leakey, L. S. B.; Savage, R. J. G.; Coryndon, S. C. (1973). Fossil Vertebrates of Africa. Vol. 3. New York & London: Academic Press.
- Savage, R. J. G.; Coryndon, S. C. (1976). Fossil Vertebrates of Africa. Vol. 4. New York & London: Academic Press.
