= Coryndon =

Coryndon is a surname. Notable people with the name include:

- Robert Coryndon (1870–1925), British colonial administrator in Africa
  - Coryndon Farm
  - Coryndon Museum
  - SS Robert Coryndon, a 1929 British twin-screw passenger and cargo ferry
- Shirley Coryndon (1926–1976), British palaeontologist
