= Saotherium =

Saotherium Temporal range: Early Pliocene 5.3–4.0 Ma

Scientific classification
- Kingdom: Animalia
- Phylum: Chordata
- Class: Mammalia
- Infraclass: Placentalia
- Order: Artiodactyla
- Family: Hippopotamidae
- Genus: †Saotherium; Boisserie, 2005
- Species: †S. mingoz

Binomial name
- †Saotherium mingoz Boisserie, 2005

Extinct genus of hippopotamus

Saotherium is an extinct genus of hippopotamid from the Early Pliocene of Africa, specifically Chad. It is represented by a single species, S. mingoz. The earliest fossils appear at the start of the Pliocene, while the latest are dated to about 4 mya.

Saotherium was a small hippopotamid similar to the pygmy hippopotamus in size and morphology. The elongated shape of its brain case and the relatively large orbits suggest a possible evolutionary relationship with the latter.
