= Kulutherium =

Kulutherium Temporal range: Burdigalian

Scientific classification
- Kingdom: Animalia
- Phylum: Chordata
- Class: Mammalia
- Order: Artiodactyla
- Family: Hippopotamidae
- Genus: †Kulutherium
- Species: †K. kenyensis

Binomial name
- †Kulutherium kenyensis Pickford, 2007

Extinct genus of hippopotamus

Kulutherium is an extinct monotypic genus of hippopotamus that lived during the Burdigalian stage of the Miocene epoch.

== Taxonomy ==
Although at first described as a suiform by Martin Pickford, more recent studies have suggested that Kulutherium was a hippopotamid instead.
