= R. J. G. Savage =

British palaeontologist (1927–1998)

- Born: Robert Joseph Gay Savage; 2 July 1927; Belfast, Northern Ireland
- Died: 9 May 1998 (aged 70); Bristol, England
- Education: Queen's University Belfast; University College London
- Spouse: Shirley Coryndon (m. 1969; died 1976)
- Scientific career
- Fields: Palaeontology
- Workplaces: University of Bristol
- Doctoral advisor: D. M. S. Watson

Robert Joseph Gay Savage (2 July 1927 – 9 May 1998) was a British palaeontologist known as Britain's leading expert on fossil mammals. He worked at the University of Bristol for nearly 40 years and studied fossils around the world, especially in North and East Africa. He produced the 1986 popular science book Mammal Evolution: An Illustrated Guide and co-edited several technical books in the Fossil Vertebrates of Africa series with fellow palaeontologist Louis Leakey.

== Early life ==
Savage was born in Belfast, Northern Ireland on 2 July 1927 to an old family prominent in Ulster. He recalled a large rack of antlers of the extinct Irish elk mounted in the entrance hall of the family home, which colleague Michael Benton writes may have inspired Savage to pursue the study of fossil mammals. He attended grammar school at Methodist College, Belfast and Wesley College, Dublin before and during the period of World War II. He enrolled in Queen's University Belfast, earning a BSc in Zoology (1948) and a first BSc in Geology (1949). For doctoral research, he was given a choice between working with Francis Rex Parrington at Cambridge University or D. M. S. Watson at University College London. He chose to work with Watson, becoming his final student, and earning a PhD in 1953 with a dissertation on the fossil otter Potamotherium.

== Academic career ==
Savage was hired as assistant lecturer at Queen's University in 1952, before he had completed his PhD. He worked with geologist J. K. Charlesworth in expanding and moving the geology department to a new building. In 1954, Savage was hired as a lecturer and curator of the Geological Museum at the University of Bristol, where he remained for the rest of his career. He was reader in vertebrate palaeontology from 1966 to 1982, and a named professor in vertebrate palaeontology from 1982 until his retirement in 1992.

Savage was known for his work in Africa, which he first visited in 1955, working with the palaeoanthropologist Louis Leakey in Kenya. He first visited North Africa in 1957, and carried out a successful series of expeditions in Libya in the 1960s, where he and his students studied the Miocene mammals of the Gebel Zelten, southern Libya, including the giant carnivorous Megistotherium. Savage's other expeditions include field work in Israel, Iran, Pakistan, India, Russia, Australia, and Venezuela. In the 1970s he began work on the Isle of Skye, Scotland where he described the first Scottish mammal from the Mesozoic, Borealestes, and the tritylodontid Stereognathus hebridicus, both from the Middle Jurassic. Savage edited two volumes of the influential Vertebrates of Africa series with Louis Leakey, and was a colleague of Richard and Meave Leakey. His 1986 non-specialist book Mammal Evolution: An Illustrated Guide became a leading work in its field, and was translated into Spanish and Japanese.

== Personal life ==
In 1969 Savage married Shirley C. Coryndon, a fellow palaeontologist and authority on fossil hippopotami. They had met in Kenya in 1955.

Savage was known to colleagues as a good-natured raconteur, and "something of a raffish gentleman explorer". Richard Leakey recalled he had "a superb sense of humour and was seldom without a twinkle in his eye that belied his rather severe exterior. Nothing pleased him more than to set his guests before his fireplace after dinner and then test their knowledge of [fossils]." Michael Benton writes that while Savage attended Methodist grammar schools, he did not maintain a Methodist or Protestant faith, but rather became a humanist in adulthood.

Coryndon died in 1976. Savage died in 1998 of pancreatic cancer, survived by two stepdaughters.

== Books ==
Fossil Vertebrates of Africa

- Leakey, L. S. B.; Savage, R. J. G. (1970). Fossil Vertebrates of Africa. Vol. 2. New York & London: Academic Press.
- Leakey, L. S. B.; Savage, R. J. G.; Coryndon, S. C. (1973). Fossil Vertebrates of Africa. Vol. 3. New York & London: Academic Press.
- Savage, R. J. G.; Coryndon, S. C. (1976). Fossil Vertebrates of Africa. Vol. 4. New York & London: Academic Press.

Other works

- Savage, R.J.G. (1977). Geological Excursions in the Bristol District. Bristol: University of Bristol. ISBN 0901239224.
- Savage, R. J. G.; Long, M. R. (1986). Mammal Evolution: An Illustrated Guide. London: British Museum (Natural History). ISBN 9780565009427.
- Dixon, Dougal; Cox, Barry; Savage, R. J. G.; Gardiner, Brian (1988). The Macmillan Illustrated Encyclopedia of Dinosaurs and Prehistoric Animals. New York: Macmillan. ISBN 9780025801912.
