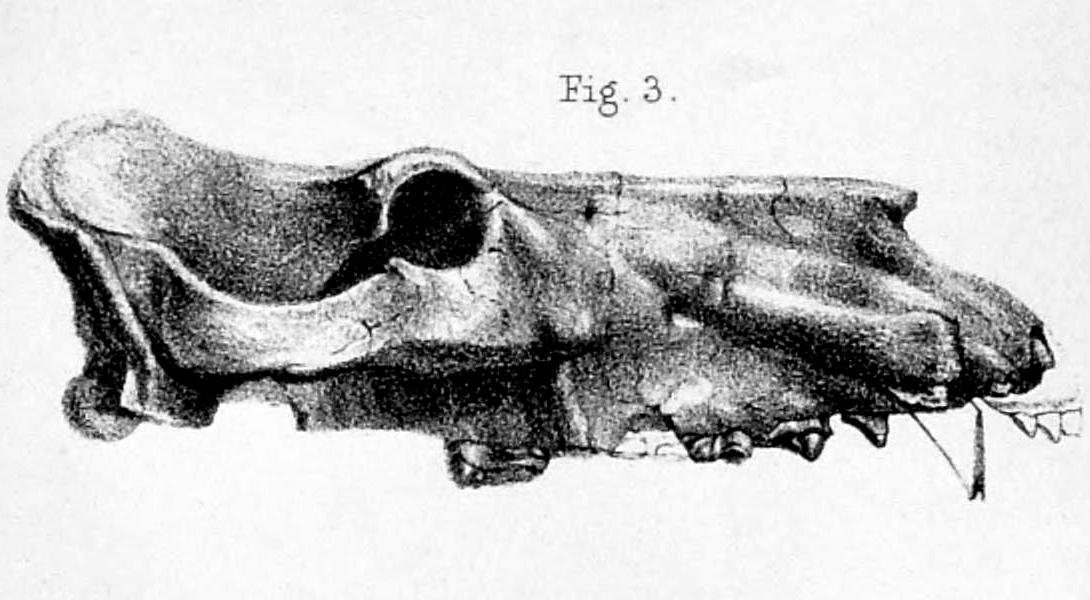

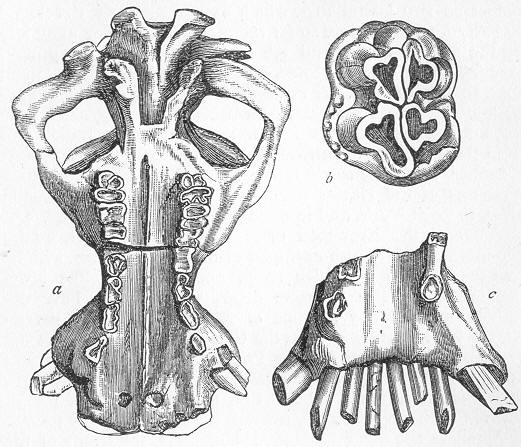
- Hexaprotodon sivalensis skull elements

Scientific classification
- Kingdom: Animalia
- Phylum: Chordata
- Class: Mammalia
- Order: Artiodactyla
- Family: Hippopotamidae
- Subfamily: Hippopotaminae
- Genus: †Hexaprotodon; Falconer & Cautley, 1836

Type species
- †Hexaprotodon sivalensis Falconer & Cautley, 1836

Species
- See text

Synonyms
- Hexoprotodon [sic]

= Hexaprotodon =

Hexaprotodon Temporal range: Latest Miocene to Late Pleistocene 6–0.015 Ma

Extinct hippopotamus genus

Hexaprotodon is an extinct genus of hippopotamid. The genus name Hexaprotodon comes from Ancient Greek ἑξα- (hexa-), meaning "six", πρῶτος (prôtos), meaning "first", and ὀδούς (odoús), meaning "tooth", therefore, "six front-teeth" as some of the fossil forms have three pairs of incisors. The pygmy hippopotamus was historically placed in the genus, but today is generally placed in its own genus. The core unambiguous Asian members of the genus ranged from the Indian subcontinent to Southeast Asia, and are thought to have had an aquatic ecology similar to that of the living common hippopotamus. Other species have been attributed to the genus from Africa and Europe, though it is unclear whether they are closely related to the Asian members of the genus. The last members of the genus became extinct during the Late Pleistocene, perhaps as recently as 15,000 years ago.

== Taxonomy ==
The name Hexaprotodon was often applied to the pygmy hippopotamus before its reclassification into the genus Choeropsis. The genus has been historically applied to numerous fossil hippopotamus species spanning Asia, Africa and Europe. The genus sensu lato, has been suggested to be paraphyletic with respect to both species of living hippopotamus. The uncontroversial, core Asian members of the genus most closely related to the type species H. sivalensis first appeared around 6 million years ago, during the latest Miocene and were widespread throughout South and Southeast Asia, with the oldest records coming from the Siwalik Hills of the northern Indian subcontinent. The African species Hexaprotodon bruneti from the Early Pleistocene of Ethiopia may be closely related to the Asian Hexaprotodon species, and thus belong in the genus in its more narrow sense. If so, it likely originates from a migration from Asia.

== Description ==
The Asian species of Hexaprotodon, like the living hippopotamus (Hippopotamus amphibius), but unlike the pygmy hippopotamus are thought to have had a semiaquatic ecology, with their skull shape greatly resembling that of H. amphibius, with elevated orbits that allowed them to see above water while submerged. This lifestyle likely evolved independently in both Hexaprotodon and the genus Hippopotamus. In comparison to Hippopotamus, the mandibular symphysis is much more robust, the canine processes do not extend laterally outwards, and the molar teeth are lower crowned. The more slender and less massive postcranial skeleton compared to H. amphibius also suggests that Hexaprotodon was less adapted to walking in mud. Dental microwear suggests a grazing diet for Asian Hexaprotodon species, similar to H. amphibius.

=== Bone measurements ===
The size range of Hexaprotodon are within the range of Hippopotamus, with the transverse distal diameter of the tibia being 8.2 cm for H. sivalensis and 7.3 cm for H. sivalensis koenigswaldi, additionally there are several teeth of H. sivalensis reported from Masol, like specimen R10135 that has M1 sup DMD x DVL of 4.66 x 3.88 cm², and Masol 6 specimen that has M3 inf DMD that ranges from 7.8-6.1 cm and DVL that ranges from 4-2.75 cm. Later M. A. Khan reported a H. sivalensis mandible from Kashmir region, the specimen's p1 to m3 teeth length is about 34 cm, m1 to m3 length is about 16.2 cm and the m3 dimensions are 6.1 x 3.5 cm².

== Extinction ==
Hexaprotodon was largely extinct by the Late Middle Pleistocene in Southeast Asia but survived in Sumatra into the early Late Pleistocene, with one tooth dated to around 70,000 years ago. The last known populations survived on the Indian Subcontinent to the very end of the Pleistocene, with among the latest dates being around 16,467–15,660 cal years Before Present from bones found in the Narmada River valley in central India. Fossil evidence from a late-surviving Indian Hexaprotodon indicates that it lived during a catastrophic drought caused by the latest Heinrich event, leading to an extremely weak Indian monsoon. It is thought that these drought conditions led to a heavy habitat fragmentation due to Hexaprotodon depending on aquatic habitats, prompting an extinction vortex. Humans may have also facilitated the extinction by hunting the hippopotamuses during this vulnerable state, although no evidence of hippopotamus butchery is known from the Indian subcontinent.

== Species ==
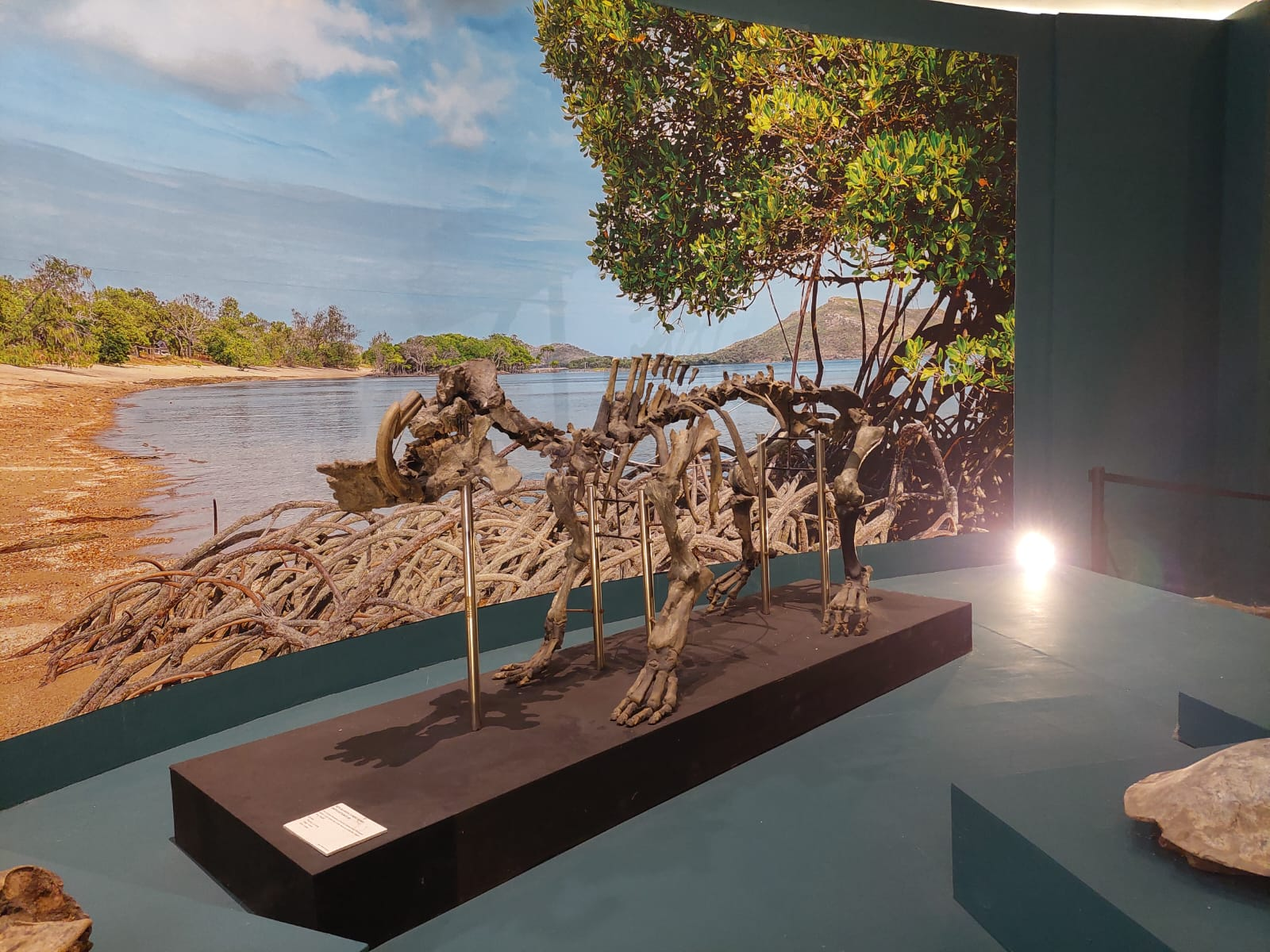
Skeletal reconstruction of Hexaprotodon sivalensis in the National Museum of Indonesia

The genus Hexaprotodon contains the following species, all from Asia and Africa:

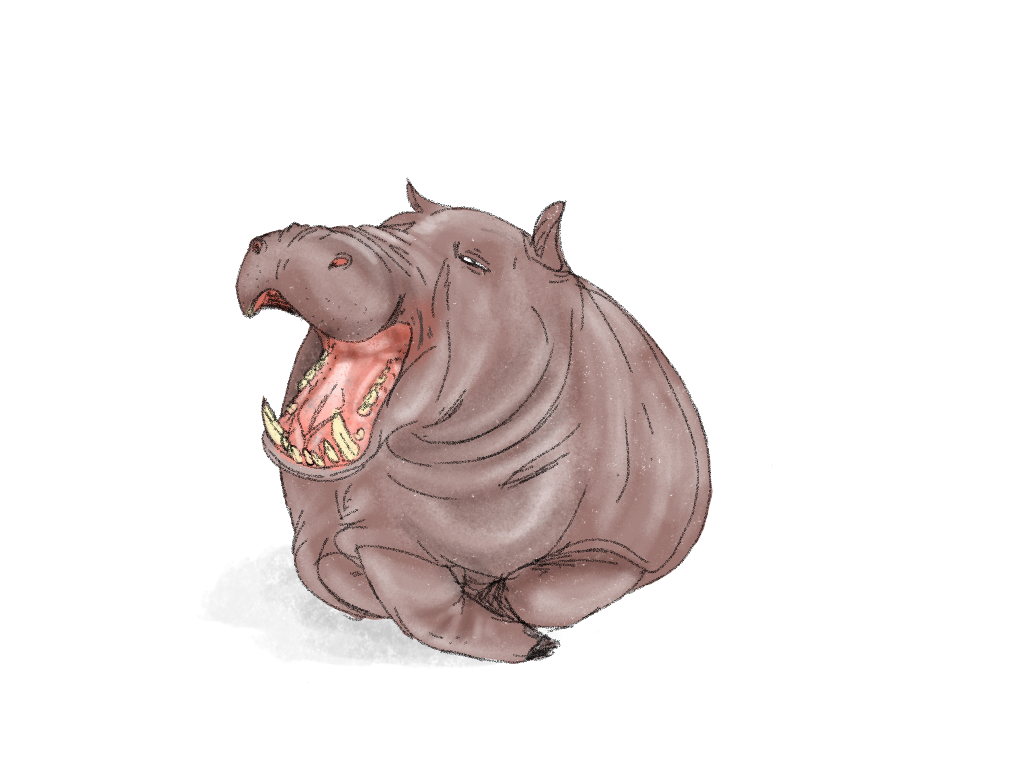
Life Restoration of Hexaprotodon sivalensis

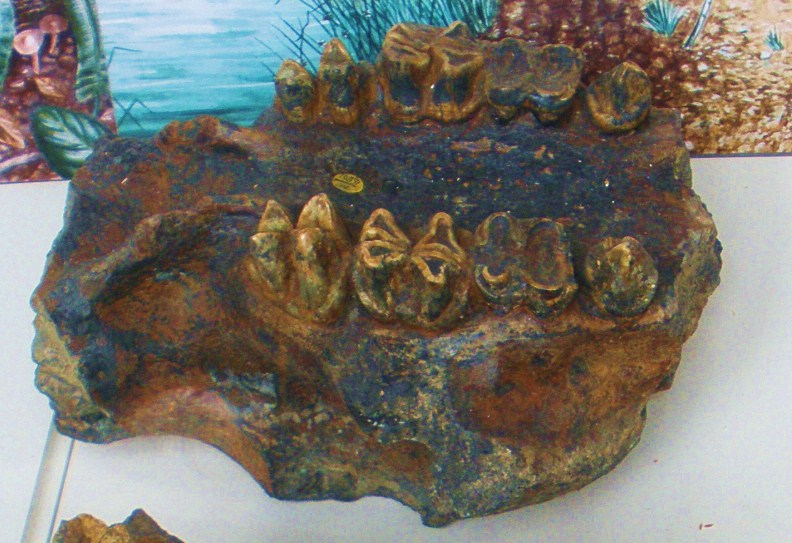
H. imagunculus

Genus sensu lato:

- Hexaprotodon bruneti (Boisserie and White, 2004)
- Hexaprotodon coryndoni
- Hexaprotodon crusafonti (Aguirre, 1963)
- Hexaprotodon garyam (Boisserie, 2005)
- Hexaprotodon hipponensis (Gaudry, 1867)
- Hexaprotodon imagunculus (Hopwood, 1926)
- Hexaprotodon iravaticus (Falconer and Cautley, 1847)
- Hexaprotodon karumensis (Coryndon, 1977)
- Hexaprotodon megakendengensis (Wibowo et al., 2026)
- Hexaprotodon mingoz (Boisserie et al., 2003)
- Hexaprotodon namadicus (Falconer and Cautley, 1847 - possibly same as H. palaeindicus)
- Hexaprotodon palaeindicus (Falconer and Cautley, 1847)
- Hexaprotodon pantanellii (Joleaud, 1920)
- Hexaprotodon primaevus (Crusafont et al., 1964)
- Hexaprotodon protamphibius (Arambourg, 1944)
- Hexaprotodon siculus (Hooijer, 1946)
- Hexaprotodon sinhaleyus (Deraniyagala)
- Hexaprotodon sivajavanicus (Hooijer, 1950)
- Hexaprotodon sivalensis (Falconer and Cautley, 1836)
- Hexaprotodon dhokwazirensis Akhtar and Bakr, 1995

Genus sensu stricto:

- Hexaprotodon bruneti (Boisserie and White, 2004)
- Hexaprotodon dhokwazirensis (Akhtar and Bakr, 1995)
- Hexaprotodon iravaticus (Falconer and Cautley, 1847)
- Hexaprotodon namadicus (Falconer and Cautley, 1847 - possibly same as H. palaeindicus)
- Hexaprotodon palaeindicus (Falconer and Cautley, 1847)
- Hexaprotodon sinhaleyus (Deraniyagala)
- Hexaprotodon sivajavanicus (Hooijer, 1950)
- Hexaprotodon sivalensis (Falconer and Cautley, 1836)
