= Masol (paleontology) =

- Location within India
- 30°50′00″N 76°50′00″E
- Location: Masol, Punjab, India

Site notes
- Excavation dates: 1960s-present

Masol is a paleontological-archaeological site in the Shivalik Frontal Range of the sub-Himalayan foothills of northwestern India, in the state of Punjab, a few kilometers north of Chandigarh. It dates from the end of the Pliocene. The fossiliferous formation called "Quranwala zone"(upper limit around 2.7 million years, lower limit 2.95 million years ago) provides what has been tentatively identified as stone tools (choppers, flakes), some in situ with cut marks and percussion marks on fossil bones in the lower layers. It may represents the oldest paleontological record of hominin activities located outside of Africa. However, it is a controversial interpretation. This criticism has been invalidated since 2021.

The majority of the site is composed of sandstone, sand, and silt, which, through time, has eroded due to wind and water action. Such geological action has contributed significantly to the natural excavation of the area.
