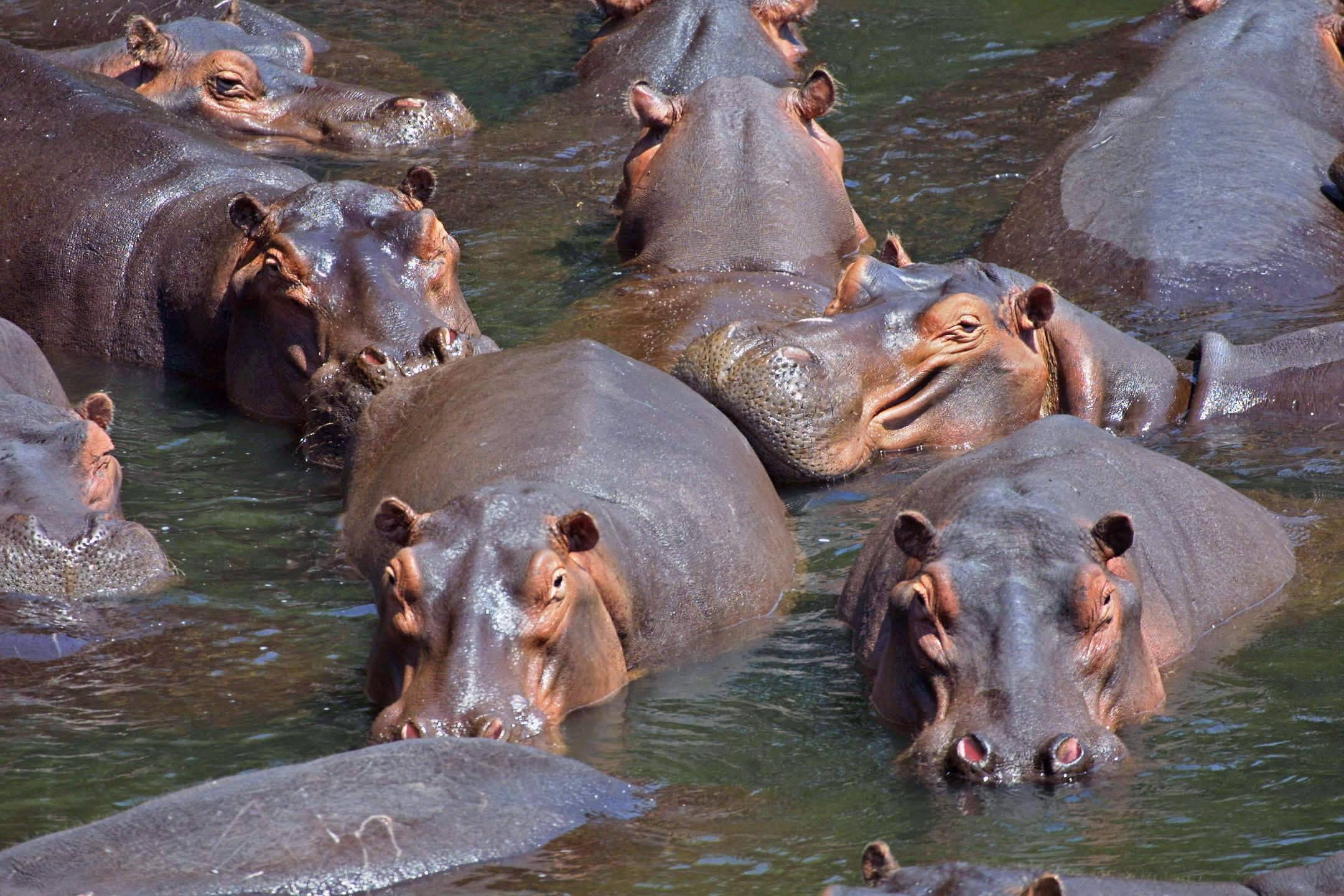
- Common hippopotamus
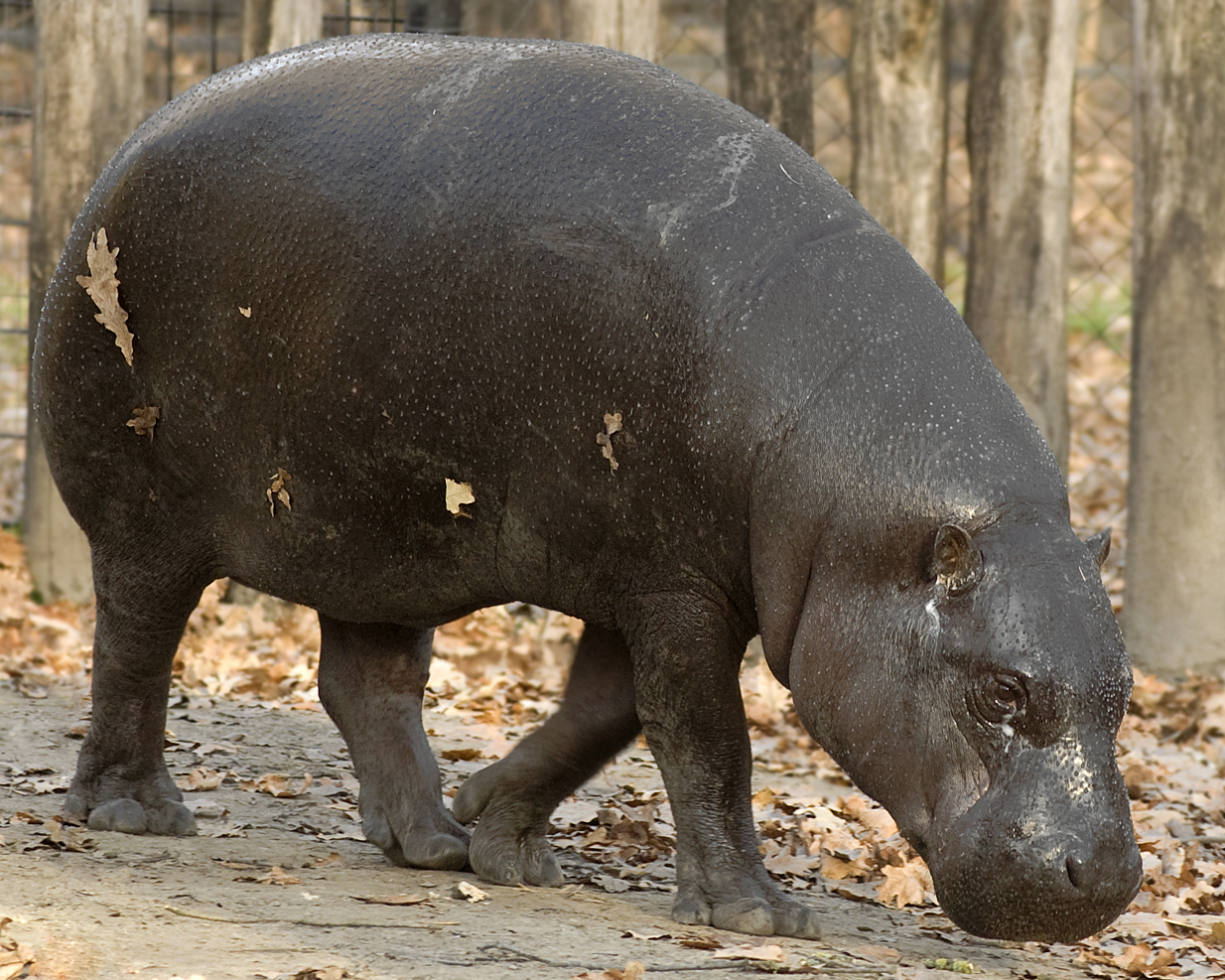
- Pygmy hippopotamus

Scientific classification
- Kingdom: Animalia
- Phylum: Chordata
- Class: Mammalia
- Order: Artiodactyla
- Infraorder: Ancodonta
- Superfamily: Hippopotamoidea
- Family: Hippopotamidae; Gray, 1821

Subtaxa
- †Trilobophorus Geze, 1985: Hippopotaminae Gray, 1821; †Archaeopotamus; Choeropsis; †Hexaprotodon; Hippopotamus; †Saotherium; †Kenyapotaminae Pickford, 1983; †Kenyapotamus; †Palaeopotamus
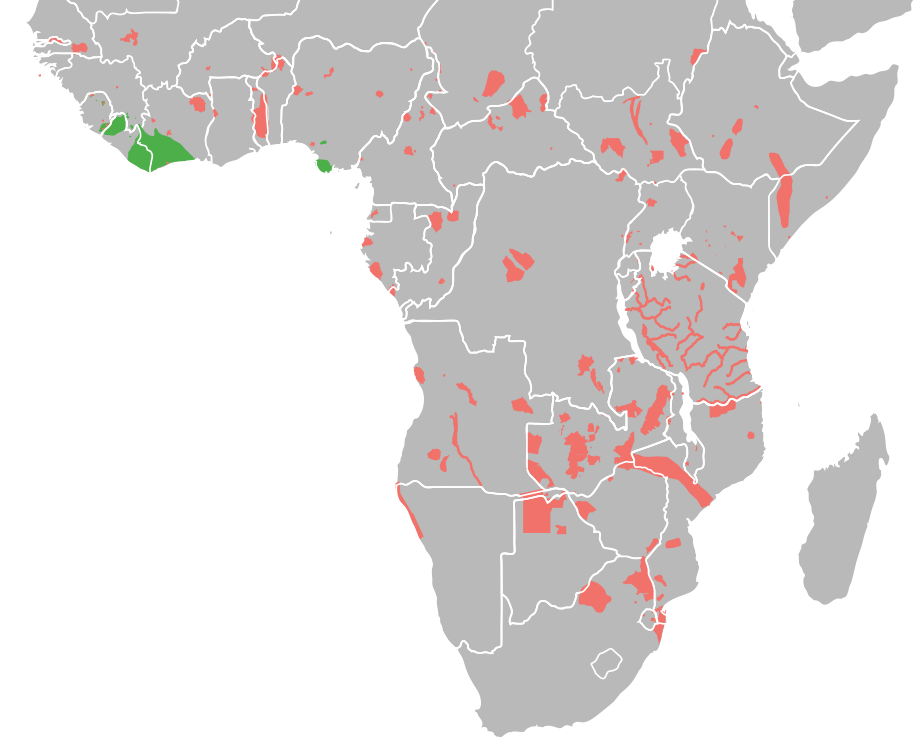
- Hippopotamidae distribution Hippopotamus amphibius in red, Choeropsis liberiensis in green

= Hippopotamidae =

Hippopotamidae Temporal range: 7.4–0 Ma Late Miocene-Recent

Family of mammals

Hippopotamidae is a family of stout, naked-skinned, and semiaquatic artiodactyl mammals, possessing three-chambered stomachs and walking on four toes on each foot. While they resemble pigs physiologically, their closest living relatives are the cetaceans. They are formally referred to as hippopotamids.

There are two living species of hippopotamid in two genera; the pygmy hippo, Choeropsis liberiensis of the forests of west Africa, and the common hippo, Hippopotamus amphibius. The term hippopotamus can also be applied to hippopotamids in general, although it is most frequently used for the common hippo and its respective genus.

== Characteristics ==
Hippopotamids are large mammals, with short, stumpy legs, and barrel-shaped bodies. They have large heads, with broad mouths, and nostrils placed at the top of their snouts. Like pigs, they have four toes, but unlike pigs, all of the toes are used in walking. Hippopotamids are unguligrade, although, unlike most other such animals, they have no hooves, instead using a pad of tough connective tissue on each foot. Their stomachs have three chambers, but they are not true ruminants.

The living species are smooth-skinned and lack both sebaceous glands and sweat glands. The outer epidermis is relatively thin, so hippos dehydrate rapidly in dry environments.

Both the incisors and canines are large and tusk-like, although the canine tusks are by far the larger. The tusks grow throughout life. The postcanine teeth are large and complex, suited for chewing the plant matter that comprises their diets. The number of incisors varies even within the same species, but the general dental formula is given in the table below:

Dentition
2–3.1.4.3
1–3.1.4.3

== Evolution ==
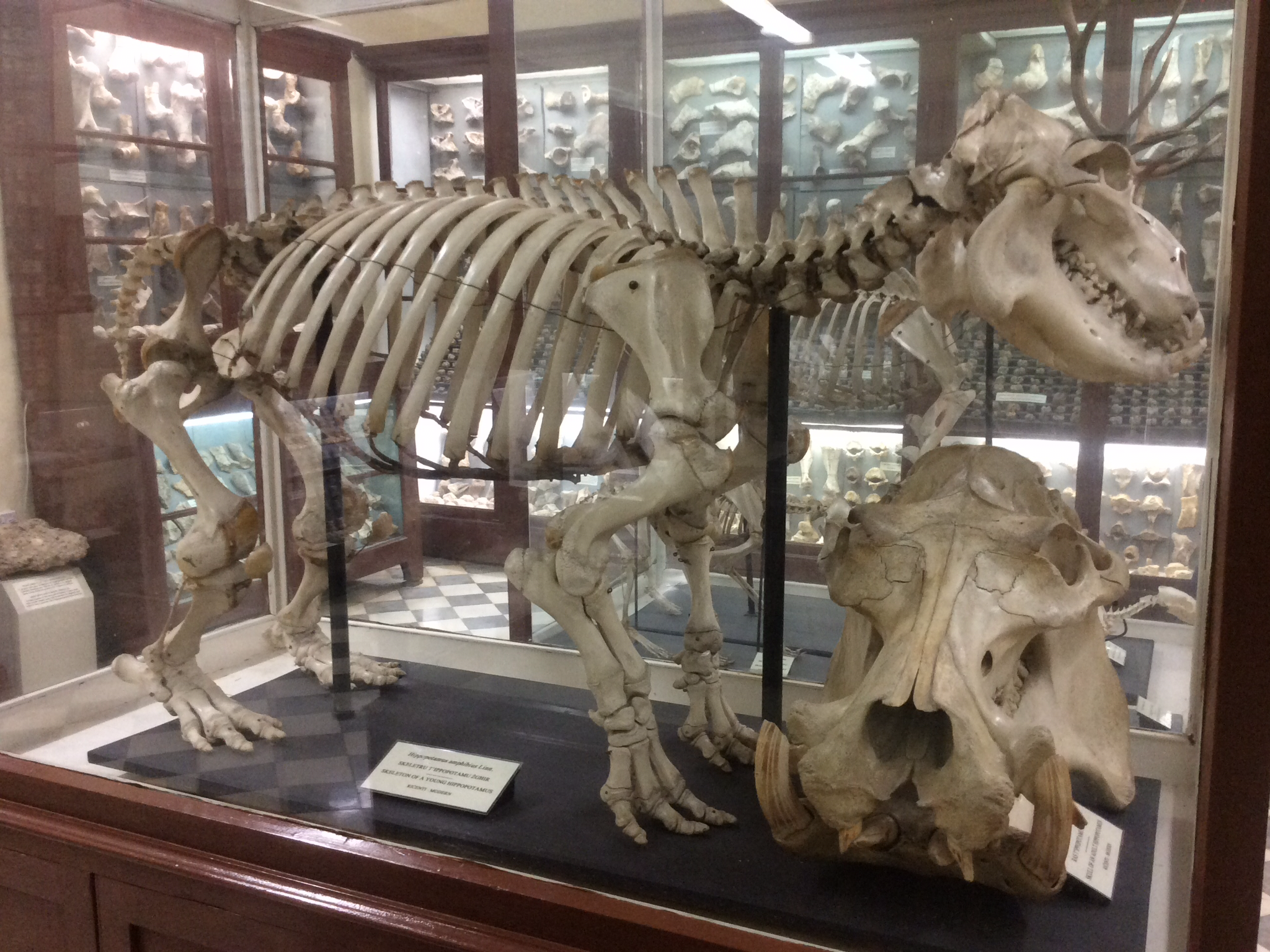
Hippopotamus skeleton at Għar Dalam

The hippopotamids are descended from the anthracotheres, a family of semiaquatic and terrestrial artiodactyls that appeared in the late Eocene, and are thought to have resembled small- or narrow-headed hippos. The hippos split off from the anthracotheres some time during the Miocene. The oldest records of Hippopotamidae are from Afro-Arabia and date to the late Miocene, approximately 7.4 million years ago, expanding into Eurasia around 6 million years ago. It has been theorised that this Late Miocene radiation of hippopotamids represents the coevolution of hippopotamids with the expansion of C_{4} grasslands, a phenomenon known as the hippopotamine event (HE). After the appearance of the hippopotamids, the remaining anthracotheres went into a decline brought about by a combination of climatic change and competition with their descendants, until the last genus, Merycopotamus, died out in the early Pliocene of India.

There were once many species of hippopotamid, but only two survive today: Hippopotamus amphibius, and Choeropsis liberiensis. They are the last survivors of two major evolutionary lineages, the hippos proper and the pygmy hippos, respectively; these lineages could arguably be considered subfamilies, but their relationship to each other – apart from being fairly distant relatives – is not well resolved.

The enigmatic Miocene Kenyapotamus is insufficiently known to be assigned a place in the hippo phylogeny with any degree of certainty. In addition, the genus Hexaprotodon, which is now largely restricted to South Asia and Southeast Asia, formerly included many fossil hippopotamuses that are now thought to be unrelated.

=== Taxonomy ===
Hippopotamidae's placement within Artiodactyla can be represented in the following cladogram:

- Artiodactyla
  - Tylopoda (camels and kin)
  - Artiofabula
    - Suina (pigs and kin)
    - Cetruminantia
      - Ruminantia (ruminants)
      - Whippomorpha (or Cetancodonta)
        - Hippopotamidae (hippopotamids)
        - Cetacea (whales)

=== Analogous structures ===
The lower canine teeth of hippopotamids are similar in function and structure to the tusks of elephants. While hippopotamids and elephants are only very distantly related within the Mammalia, the lower canine teeth of both groups are long and have a slight curve, and species of both families use this structure when fighting.

== Species ==
The systematics and taxonomy used here mostly follows a review by J.-R. Boisserie (Note: Boisserie (2005) identified the species Hippopotamus minor as Phanourios minutus, but this genus is not widely recognized.) and the American Society of Mammalogists.

=== Recent species ===
- Genus Hippopotamus – true hippopotamuses
  - Hippopotamus amphibius – hippopotamus (Africa)
  - †Hippopotamus lemerlei – Lemerle's dwarf hippopotamus (Madagascar; Holocene)
  - †Hippopotamus madagascariensis – Madagascan dwarf hippopotamus (Madagascar; Holocene)
- Genus Choeropsis – pygmy hippopotamuses
  - Choeropsis liberiensis – pygmy hippopotamus (west Africa)

=== Fossil species ===
- Genus Hippopotamus – true hippopotamuses
  - †Hippopotamus antiquus – mainland Europe & British Isles; Pleistocene
  - †Hippopotamus creutzburgi – Crete; Pleistocene
  - †Hippopotamus minor – Cyprus; Pleistocene to Holocene
  - †Hippopotamus melitensis – Malta; Pleistocene
  - †Hippopotamus pentlandi – Sicily; Pleistocene
  - †Hippopotamus laloumena – Madagascar; Holocene
  - †Hippopotamus gorgops – Africa Late Miocene–Middle Pleistocene
- Tentatively placed into Hippopotamus:
  - †Hippopotamus aethiopicus – Kenya & Ethiopia; Pliocene -Pleistocene
  - †Hippopotamus afarensis – Ethiopia, formerly genus Trilobophorus; Pliocene
  - †Hippopotamus behemoth – Israel, Early Pleistocene
  - †Hippopotamus kaisensis – Central Africa; Pliocene
  - †Hippopotamus sirensis – Morocco & Algeria; Pleistocene
- Genus Hexaprotodon – hexaprotodons or Asian hippopotamuses
  - †Hexaprotodon bruneti – Ethiopia; Pliocene
  - †Hexaprotodon coryndoni – Ethiopia; Pliocene
  - †Hexaprotodon crusafonti – Spain; Late Miocene (syn. Hexaprotodon primaevus)
  - †Hexaprotodon hipponensis – Algeria
  - †Hexaprotodon imagunculus – Uganda and Congo; Pliocene
  - †Hexaprotodon iravaticus – Myanmar; Pliocene – Pleistocene
  - †Hexaprotodon karumensis – Kenya and Eritrea; Pleistocene
  - †Hexaprotodon namadicus – India; (possibly same as Hex. palaeindicus)
  - †Hexaprotodon palaeindicus – India;
  - †Hexaprotodon pantanellii – Italy; Pliocene
  - †Hexaprotodon protamphibius – Kenya and Chad; Pliocene
  - †Hexaprotodon siculus –
  - †Hexaprotodon sivajavanicus – Indonesia
  - †Hexaprotodon sivalensis – India
  - †Hexaprotodon sp. (undescribed) – Myanmar
- Genus Archaeopotamus – formerly included in Hexaprotodon
  - †Archaeopotamus harvardi – Arabian Peninsula and Central Africa; Miocene – Pliocene
  - †Archaeopotamus lothagamensis – Kenya; Miocene
- One or two undescribed species
- Genus Saotherium – formerly included in Hexaprotodon
  - †Saotherium mingoz Chad; Pliocene

== See also ==
- List of individual hippopotamids
