= Kenyapotamus =

Kenyapotamus Temporal range: Middle Miocene to Late Miocene

Scientific classification
- Kingdom: Animalia
- Phylum: Chordata
- Class: Mammalia
- Order: Artiodactyla
- Family: Hippopotamidae
- Subfamily: †Kenyapotaminae
- Genus: †Kenyapotamus; Pickford, 1983

Species
- K. coryndoni and K. ternani

Possible ancestor of living hippopotamuses

Kenyapotamus is an extinct genus of hippopotamid and possible ancestor of living hippopotamuses that lived roughly 16 million to 8 million years ago during the Miocene epoch. Its name reflects that its fossils were first found in modern-day Kenya.

Although little is known about Kenyapotamus, its dental pattern bore similarities to that of the genus Xenohyus, a European suid from the Early Miocene. This led some scientists to conclude that hippopotami were most closely related to modern peccaries and suids.

Recent molecular research has suggested that hippopotamuses are more closely related to cetaceans than to other artiodactyls. A morphological analysis of fossil artiodactyls and whales, which also included Kenyapotamus, strongly supported a relationship between hippos and the anatomically similar family Anthracotheriidae. Two archaic whales (Pakicetus and Artiocetus) formed the sister group of the hippopotamid-anthracotheriid clade, but this relationship was weakly supported.

== Palaeoecology ==
Kenyapotamus coryndoni had a C_{3} plant based diet approximately 9.9 Ma, but by 9.6 Ma, its diet had shifted to be a mixture of C_{3} and C_{4} plants, with only one specimen from this interval showing a predominantly C_{3} diet.
