= Floppy trunk syndrome =

Disease of African bush elephants

Floppy trunk syndrome (abbreviated FTS, also known as flaccid trunk paralysis) is a condition that causes trunk paralysis in African bush elephants. Initially observed in 1989, the syndrome primarily affected bull elephants in several select regions in Zimbabwe. Afflicted elephants exhibit paralysis in their trunk, often having to adapt to feed. The loss of their trunks' prehensile abilities results in malnutrition and possibly death. The condition is a result of degeneration of nerves in the trunk, and is suggested to be a result of either heavy metals or toxins. There is debate over whether the condition is reversible.

== History ==
Floppy trunk syndrome was initially observed in 1989 on Fothergill Island, in Matusadona National Park, Zimbabwe, near Lake Kariba. Five more cases were observed in the same location around a year later, and several more cases were observed in July and August 1992. Several elephants suffering from the condition were surgically biopsied while paralyzed in May 1989, and a necropsy of affected elephants was performed in November 1991 and April 1992.

== Signs and symptoms ==
Elephants with floppy trunk syndrome typically initially exhibit a loss of their trunk's prehensile abilities. The paralysis has been observed to start at the tip and work its way upward over the course of several months. As their trunks become increasingly paralyzed, elephants have difficulty feeding and learn to use their front feet or throw their trunk over branches to aid feeding. To avoid stomping on their trunk while walking, an elephant afflicted with the condition would fling their trunk over their tusks. In later stages of paralysis, affected elephants needed to submerge themselves partially in water to drink. However, despite these learned adaptations, affected elephants were observed as emaciated, suffering from muscle atrophy and a lack of visceral fat. Untreated, this handicap could result in starvation.

== Scope ==
FTS has been observed in the northwest of Zimbabwe, the Satara area of Kruger National Park, and Fothergill in Lake Kariba. The syndrome has only been observed in free-ranging elephants specifically Loxodonta africana, and primarily affects older male elephants. Over thirty elephants were observed to be afflicted with this paralysis, including at least eight in Kruger National Park and twelve cases near Fothergill Island. In Gonarezhou National Park in south eastern Zimbabwe, several cases of FTS have been reported since 2013 (approximately half a dozen individuals) all of which were elephant bulls.

== Possible causes ==
The paralysis is caused by degeneration of peripheral nerves, which begins at the tip of the trunk.

A comparison of areas affected by FTS and unaffected areas suggests three plant species may be the cause: Heliotropium, specifically Heliotropium ovalifolium, Indigofera, and Boerhavia. Native to Nigeria, Heliotropium ovalifolium is known to be poisonous and has been cited to cause diarrhea and bleeding in humans. It is theorized that elephants are being forced to consume toxic vegetation due to changes in weather patterns and to the natural ecology of their habitats. Several cases were observed when drought conditions enabled elephants to access grasslands adjacent to Fothergill Island.

Lead poisoning has also been suggested as a cause. The degeneration of nerves found in afflicted elephants mirrors the effect of lead intoxication in humans and horses. Additionally, potentially mitigating factors of lead poisoning, such as dietary selenium, are deficient in Zimbabwe.

== Treatment ==
There is no known treatment for FTS, as the cause is not yet known. There are conflicting reports on whether the paralysis is reversible; some sources claim that moving an elephant away from the area in which it contracted the condition will allow it to recover, while others claim that damage to the trunk is irreversible.

In some extreme cases, wildlife managers have had to euthanise affected elephants.
