= Craig (elephant) =

Bull elephant with large tusks

- Craig the elephant
- Species: African bush elephant
- Sex: male
- Born: c. 1972; Amboseli National Park
- Died: 3 January 2026 (aged 54); Mount Kilimanjaro
- Known for: Large tusks

Craig (c. 1972 – 3 January 2026) was a male African elephant who lived in the Amboseli National Park in Kenya. He was one of the last remaining elephants with large tusks in this part of Africa and his weighed over 45 kilograms (99 lb) each, being an estimated 2.1 metres (6.9 ft) long so that they reached the ground.

== Life ==
Craig was born around 1972 to Cassandra, the matriarch of the CB herd which was studied by Cynthia Moss, who founded the Amboseli Elephant Research Project. Moss named most of the members of this herd with names beginning with the letter C. The elephant was a "super tusker": bull elephants with tusks weighing over 100 pounds each. Super tuskers are rare in the natural world as they are favourite targets of poachers who participate in the illegal ivory trade.

Craig became a symbol of the conservation of wildlife in East Africa. The elephant was popular with conservationists, tourists and the local Maasai people. In 2021, East African Breweries used an image of Craig for its Tusker brand beer. Over the course of his life, he fathered numerous calves.

Craig died after his last set of molar teeth wore out and he could no longer chew his food properly. This affected his digestion and he died in the early hours of 3 January 2026 after the rough diet had ruptured his intestines. Park rangers maintained a vigil over his last resting place on the lower slopes of Mount Kilimanjaro. He is survived by his sister Cerise.

== Legacy ==
Craig's tusks were taken into custody as government trophies by the Kenya Wildlife Service under the authority of the Wildlife Conservation and Management Act. They and other remains may be moved to the national museum in Nairobi where the remains of other large tuskers such as Tim, another famous elephant from Amboseli National Park, are held.

== See also ==
- List of individual elephants
- Echo (elephant) – a much-studied matriarch in Amboseli
