= All the President's Elephants =

2012 wildlife documentary film

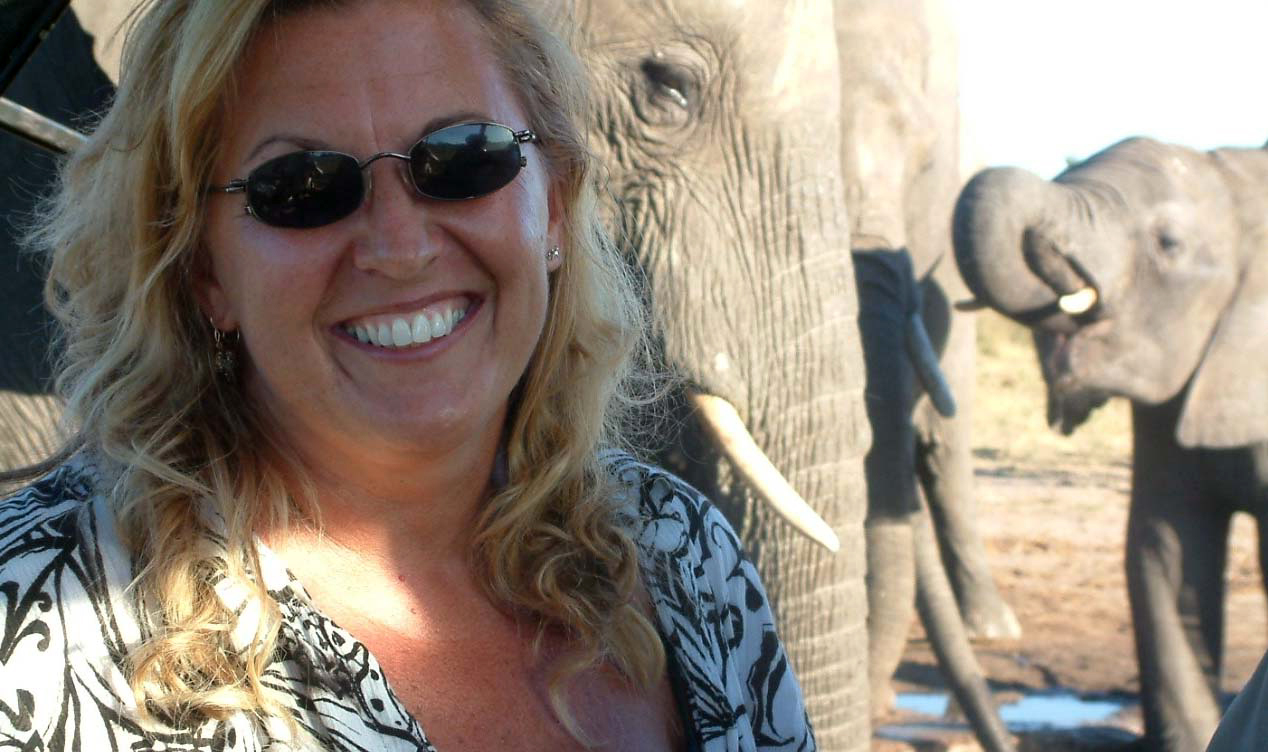
- Sharon Pincott has an intimate relationship with the Presidential Elephants of Zimbabwe in Hwange
- Directed by: Kira Ivanoff; Richard Slater-Jones
- Produced by: Kira Ivanoff; Richard Slater-Jones
- Starring: Sharon Pincott
- Cinematography: Riaan Laubscher; Dale Hancock; Don Percival
- Edited by: Katherine Pienaar
- Production companies: Triosphere, South Africa; NHU Africa
- Distributed by: Blue Ant Media
- Release date: July 20, 2012 (Durban International Film Festival)
- Running time: 52 minutes
- Country: Zimbabwe
- Language: English

All the President's Elephants is a wildlife documentary about Australian conservationist Sharon Pincott and her more than a decade of full-time voluntary work monitoring, protecting and promoting a herd of several hundred wild, free-roaming, elephants known as The Presidential Elephants of Zimbabwe, on land bordering Hwange National Park. It has been described as "unforgettable". In a review of this documentary, Animals 24-7 - who are known as being a nonprofit independent online investigative newspaper and information service reporting about humane work worldwide - states that the elephants "accepted Pincott’s presence and welcomed her. And at times it was evident that some of the elephants sought emotional comfort from Pincott, as one might seek from a close family member or friend".

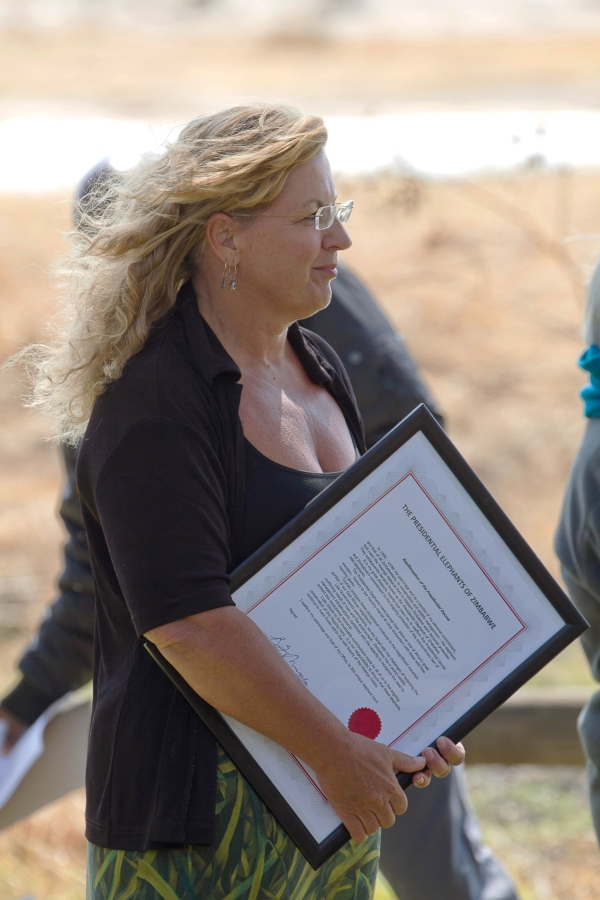
Sharon Pincott with the Presidential Reaffirmation Decree prepared for the welfare of the Presidential Elephants of Zimbabwe, signed by President Robert Mugabe in 2011

== Synopsis ==
All the President's Elephants is an account of Sharon Pincott's move from Queensland, Australia – where she worked as an Information Technology Consultant – to Zimbabwe, during the Robert Mugabe dictatorial regime. In addition to her often risky daily wildlife conservation work, she formed intimate relationships with these elephant families and successfully obtained a Reaffirmation of the Presidential Decree, which was ultimately executed by way of a ceremony officiated by Francis Nhema, one of President Robert Mugabe's Cabinet Ministers whose portfolio included the Environment, after Pincott afforded him his first encounter with these wild elephants, during the filming of this documentary.

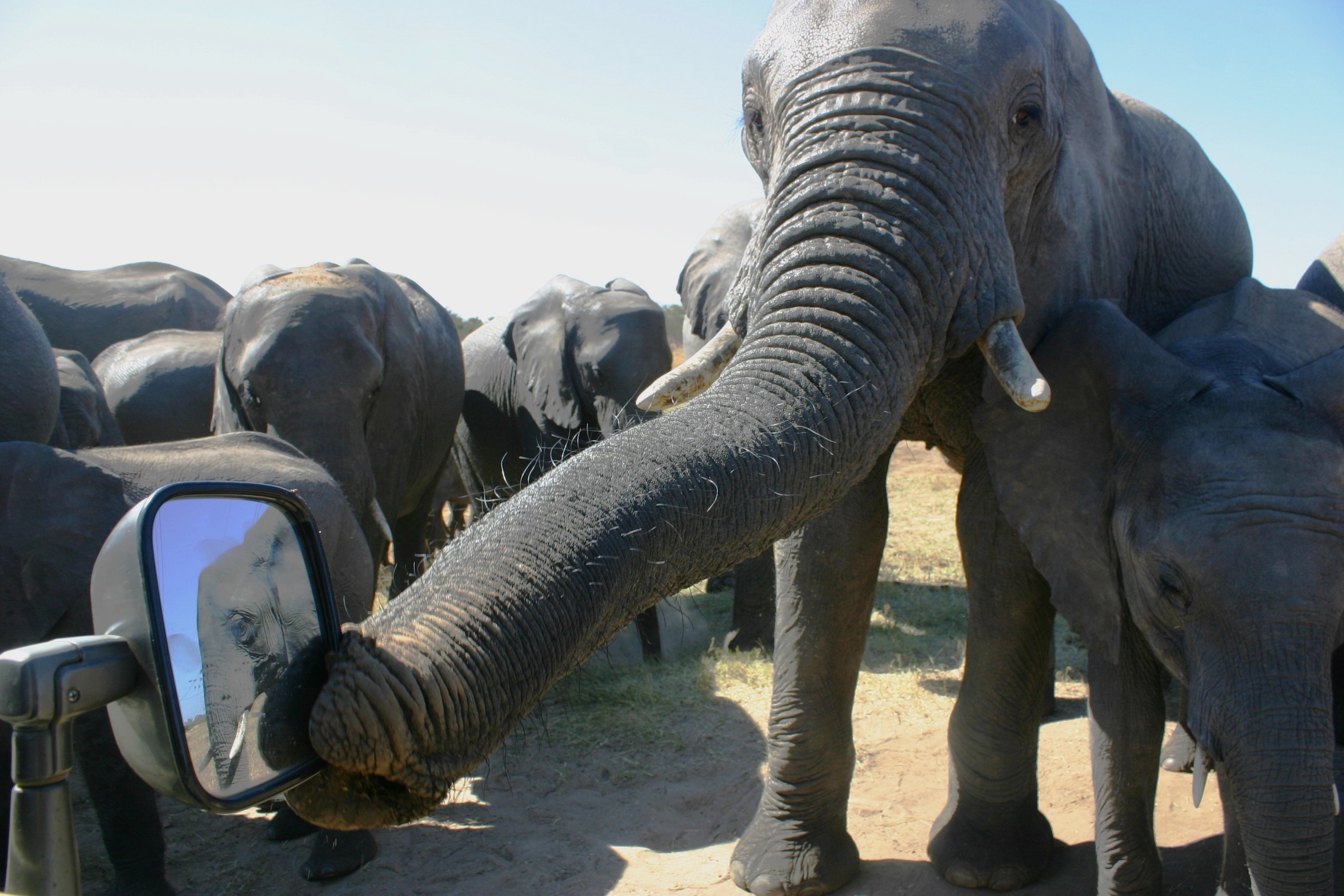
The Presidential Elephant 'A family' sharing close companionship with Australian conservationist Sharon Pincott while she sits in her 4x4 in Hwange, Zimbabwe

Pincott came to the attention of Natural History Unit (NHU) Africa, and the South African production company Triosphere which specializes in wildlife and reality programs, as being one of "those who stand at the forefront of protecting wildlife across the African country", particularly after becoming a published author in 2009.

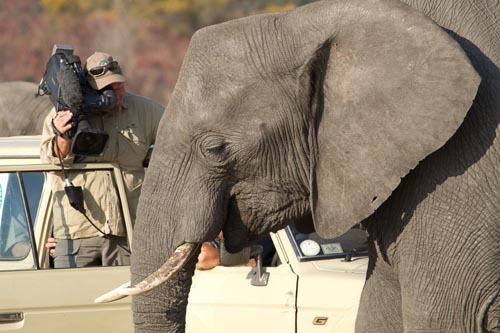
Triosphere cameraman, Riaan Laubscher, during the filming of All the President's Elephants in Hwange, Zimbabwe

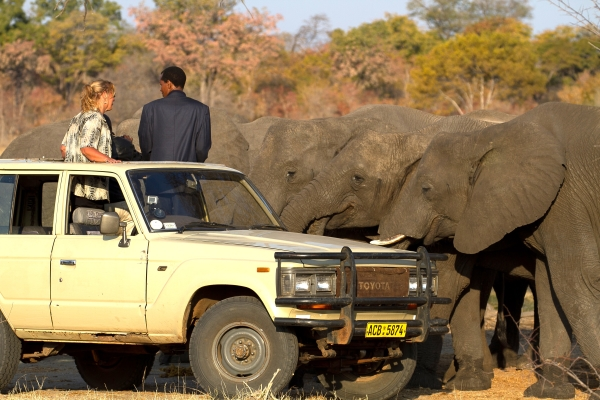
Sharon Pincott introduced the Environment Minister, Francis Nhema, to the Presidential Elephants of Zimbabwe, during the filming of All the President's Elephants

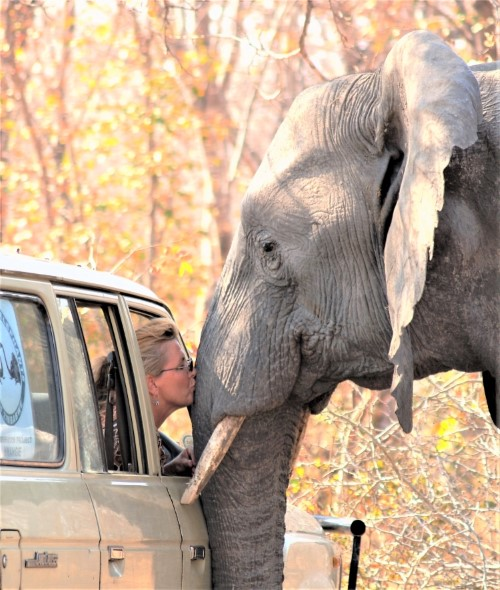
Sharon Pincott kissing the wild, free-roaming, adult female Presidential elephant who she had named Willa, from the W family, in Hwange, Zimbabwe

== Awards and screenings ==
All the President's Elephants premiered at the 2012 Durban International Film Festival, where it was considered among the best on show. During an interview with Pincott in 2013 Screen Africa – Africa's leading broadcast and film publication – called the film "touching and profound...beautifully emphasis[ing] the deep relationship between Pincott and the elephants".

Official Nominations for this documentary include – South African Film and Television Awards 2013: Best TV Wildlife Program, Best Director, Best Editor, Best Cinematographer. Official Film Festival Selections: Durban International Film Festival 2012; Joburg Film Festival, South Africa 2013; Netherlands Film Festival 2013; France 2013. In 2013, at the Japan Wildlife Film Festival, which receives over 400 film entries from over 40 countries and is attended by some 40 thousand members of the public who come from all over Japan, it won ‘Outstanding Contribution to Nature' – with the judges commenting how “very moving” it was “to see how closely people and elephants can be mentally connected”, and expressing their respect and appreciation for Pincott's elephant conservation work. It was also a finalist at the Sichuan Television Festival 2013, China Gold Panda award, for ‘Best Nature & Protection Award'. Intrepid Explorer magazine called it “riveting” and “graphic and powerful”. When it screened on French television, its name was changed to The Elephant Guardian (La Gardienne Des Éléphants) – matching the name Pincott was frequently called in Zimbabwe. It also screened on television in various French-speaking countries including France, and also Denmark, Poland, South Africa, Kenya and Australia. In 2016, it was a finalist in the International Elephant Film Festival, which was partnered with the Jackson Hole Wildlife Film Festival, since renamed Jackson Wild – where the world's best elephant films from the previous nine years were celebrated, known now as one of the ‘World's best elephant films' from the previous 9 years – an event that received more than 250 entries and involved a panel of international judges including those from the United Nations and CITES. It was released on DVD, with distribution rights acquired by Blue Ant Media. It is screening freely in all regions around the world on Stirr.com.

== Comparisons and legacy ==
This documentary, along with her associated memoirs, cemented Sharon Pincott as being known internationally as one of the women who, like Cynthia Moss and Joyce Poole, are renowned for their elephant conservation work, just as Jane Goodall (chimpanzees) and Dian Fossey (gorillas) are renowned for their work with primates. Pincott also became known as the Joy Adamson of Zimbabwe.

== See also ==
- Sharon Pincott
- Elephant conservation
- Durban International Film Festival
- Jackson Wild
- South African Film and Television Awards
