= Elephants' graveyard =

Place where elephants have died in legend

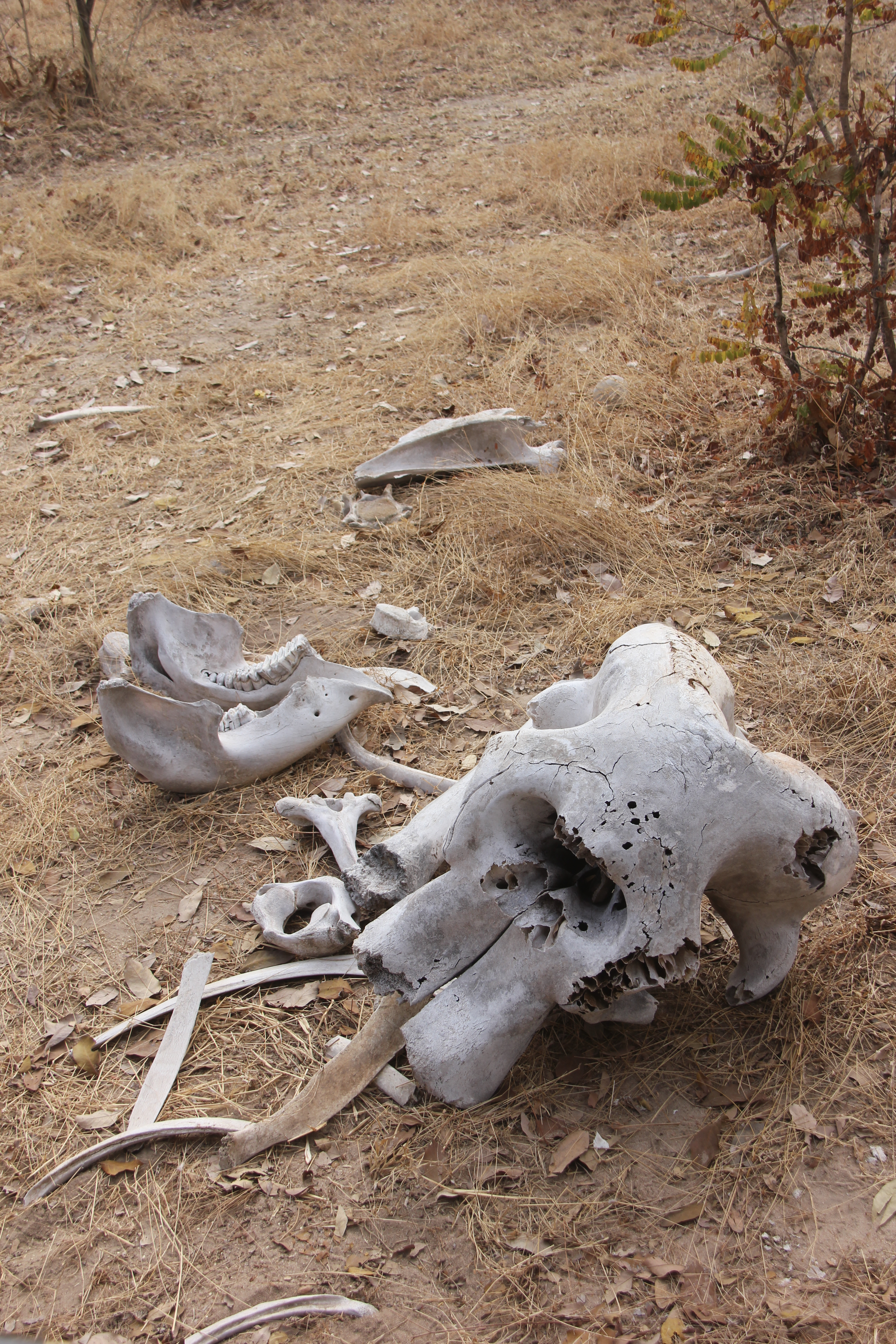
An elephant skull in Tanzania

An elephants' graveyard (also called elephant graveyard, elephant's graveyard, or elephants' cemetery) is a place where, according to legend, old elephants instinctively direct themselves when they reach a certain age. According to this legend, these elephants would then die there alone, far from the group. However, there is no evidence in support of the existence of the elephants' graveyard.

== Origin ==
Several theories have been proposed to explain the origin of this myth. One theory involves people finding groups of elephant skeletons together, or observing old elephants and skeletons in the same habitat. Others suggest the term may spring from group die-offs, such as one alleged episode excavated in Neumark Nord in Saxony-Anhalt, which had 27 straight-tusked elephant skeletons. Later analysis suggested that the accumulation of straight-tusked elephants at the site was instead the result of deliberate hunting by Neanderthals over a long period of time (decades to centuries), with the skeletons displaying extensive butchery marks.

Other theories focus on elephant behavior during lean times, suggesting starving or elderly elephants who have worn their teeth down to a point that they can no longer chew tougher foods gather in places where finding food is easier, and subsequently die there. Prolific elephant hunter Walter "Karamojo" Bell discounted the idea of the elephant's graveyard, stating that bones and "tusks were still lying about in the bush where they had lain for years".

== Popular culture ==
The idea of an elephant graveyard first appeared in popular culture with Sir Rider Haggard's The Ivory Child (1916), the twelfth of the eighteen Allan Quatermain adventures.

The idea of a graveyard for elephants was popularized in films such as Trader Horn and MGM's Tarzan films, in which groups of greedy explorers attempt to locate the elephants' graveyard, on the fictional Mutia Escarpment, in search of its riches of ivory.

Disney's 1994 animated musical film The Lion King has a reference to this motif, as well as its musical adaptation, video game adaptation, and the 2019 remake of the film.

In the video game Tarzan: Untamed, Tantor accidentally leads hunters to the Elephant Graveyard where they are buried after Tarzan beats them.

== Derivative meanings ==
- In geology, "elephants' graveyard" is an informal term for a hypothetical accumulation of "large blocks of country rock stoped from the roofs of batholiths".
- In military settings, it is sometimes used as a slang term to describe postings or assignments for senior officers for whom there is no potential for further promotion.
- In Spain, the Spanish Senate is often criticised as a cementerio de elefantes where politicians who have lost their previous positions end up doing no productive work.
- In Spain, the cementerio de elefantes is also utilized as workplace harassment technique, when an employee is still on the payroll and has only nominal responsibilities in their work description, like clocking in and out, but no real effective work. Is a similar concept to the Japanese madogiwa zoku.
- It is a term for the offices and a secretary provided to former high-ranking executives of large companies (at least in the United States), who have either retired or resigned. An executive who relinquishes or is relieved of authority becomes a consultant (special adviser) where they continue to receive a salary and an office under their contract but have little or no actual responsibilities until their non-compete agreement expires.

Additionally the term "elephants' graveyard" has been deliberately used in a symbolic fashion to refer to specific paleontological sites, such as the elephant-fossil deposit that René Jeannel, professor at the French National Museum of Natural History, discovered during a Kenya & Ethiopia expedition in 1932.

== See also ==
- Elephant cognition and reports of elephant death rituals.
