= Elephant cognition =

Intelligence and awareness in elephants

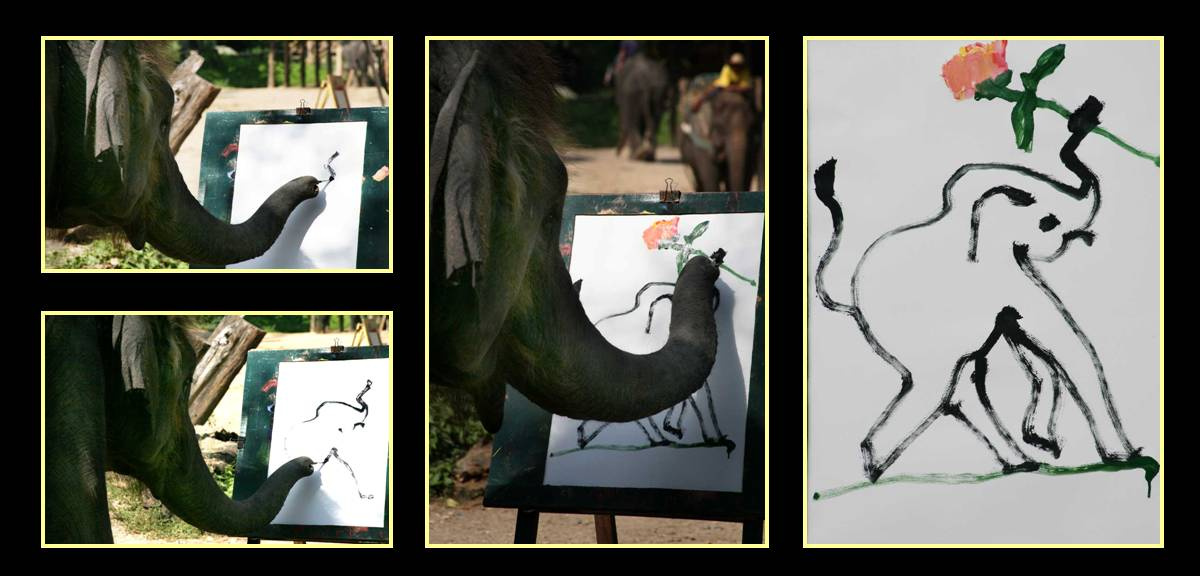
Elephant painting a taught image

Elephant cognition is animal cognition as present in elephants. Most contemporary ethologists view the elephant as one of the world's most intelligent animals. Elephants manifest a wide variety of behaviors, including those associated with grief, learning, mimicry, playing, altruism, tool use, compassion, cooperation, self-awareness, memory, and communication. They can also exhibit negative qualities such as revenge towards those perceived to have harmed them or their families. Duncan McNair, a lawyer and founder of conservation charity Save The Asian Elephants, told Newsweek that ... "although gentle creatures, elephants can be dangerous and deadly".

Evidence suggests elephants may understand pointing, the ability to nonverbally communicate an object by extending their multi-purpose trunks.

An elephant brain weighs around 5 kg (11 lb), which is about four times the size of a human brain and the heaviest of any terrestrial animal. It has about 257 billion neurons, which is about three times the number of neurons as a human brain. However, the cerebral cortex, which is the major center of cognition, has only about one-third of the number of neurons as a human's cerebral cortex. While elephant brains look similar to those of humans and other mammals and has the same functional areas, there are certain unique structural differences.

The intelligence of elephants is described as on par with cetaceans and various primates. Due to its higher cognitive intelligence and presence of family ties, researchers and wildlife experts argue that it is morally wrong for humans to kill them. Aristotle described the elephant as "the animal that surpasses all others in wit and mind."

== Structure of the brain ==
=== Cerebral cortex ===
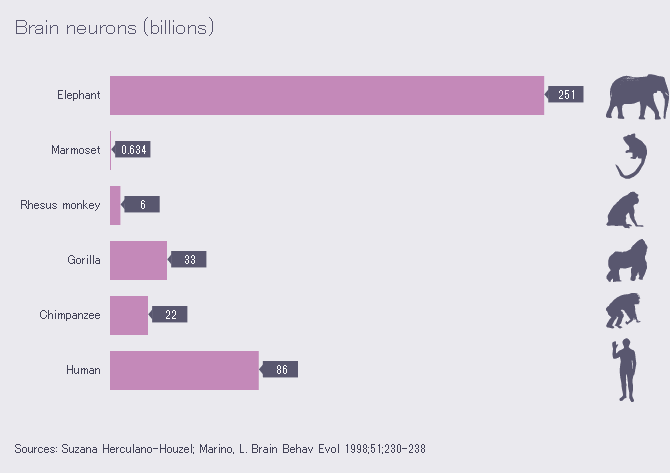
Brain neurons (billions)

The living species of elephant (both Asian and African) have a very large and highly complex neocortex, a trait also shared by humans, apes and certain dolphin species.

Asian elephants have the greatest volume of cerebral cortex available for cognitive processing of all existing land animals. It exceeds that of any primate species, with one study suggesting elephants be placed in the category of great apes in terms of cognitive abilities for tool use and tool making.

The elephant brain exhibits a gyral pattern more complex and with more numerous convolutions, or brain folds, than that of humans, other primates, or carnivores, but less complex than that of cetaceans. Elephants are believed to rank equal with dolphins in terms of problem-solving abilities, and many scientists tend to rank elephant intelligence at the same level as cetaceans; a 2011 article published by ABC Science suggests that, "elephants [are as] smart as chimps, [and] dolphins".

=== Other areas of the brain ===
Elephants also have a very large and highly convoluted hippocampus, a brain structure in the limbic system that is much bigger than that of any human, primate or cetacean. The hippocampus of an elephant takes up about 0.7% of the central structures of the brain, comparable to 0.5% for humans and with 0.1% in Risso's dolphins and 0.05% in bottlenose dolphins.

The hippocampus is linked to emotion through the processing of certain types of memory, especially spatial. This is thought to be possibly why elephants suffer from psychological flashbacks and the equivalent of post-traumatic stress disorder (PTSD).

The encephalization quotient (EQ) (the size of the brain relative to body size) of elephants ranges from 1.13 to 2.36. The average EQ is 2.14 for Asian elephants, and 1.67 for African, with the overall average being 1.88. In comparison to other animals, the La Plata dolphin has an EQ of 1.67; the Ganges river dolphin of 1.55; the orca of 2.57; the bottlenose dolphin of 4.14; and the tucuxi dolphin of 4.56; chimpanzees at 2.49; dogs at 1.17, cats at 1.00; and mice at 0.50. Humans have an EQ of 7.44.

=== Brain size at birth relative to adult brain size ===
Comparing brain size at birth to the size of a fully developed adult's brain is one way to estimate how much an animal relies on learning as opposed to instinct. The majority of mammals are born with a brain close to 90% of the adult weight, while humans are born with 28%, bottlenose dolphins with 42.5%, chimpanzees with 54%, and elephants with 35%.

=== Spindle neurons ===
Spindle cells appear to play a central role in the development of intelligent behavior. As well as in humans and the rest of the great apes, spindle neurons are also found in the brains of both Asian and African elephants, as well as humpback whales, fin whales, killer whales, sperm whales, bottlenose dolphins, Risso's dolphins, and beluga whales. The remarkable similarity between the elephant brain and the human brain supports the thesis of convergent evolution.

== Elephant society ==
The elephant has one of the most closely knit societies of any living species. Elephant families can only be separated by death or capture. Cynthia Moss, an ethologist specialising in elephants, recalls an event involving a family of African elephants:

Two members of the family were shot by poachers, who were subsequently chased off by the remaining elephants. Although one of the elephants died, the other, named Tina, remained standing, but with knees beginning to give way. Two family members, Trista and Teresia (Tina's mother), walked to both sides of Tina and leaned in to hold her up. Eventually, Tina grew so weak, she fell to the ground and died. However, Trista and Teresia did not give up but continually tried to lift her. They managed to get Tina into a sitting position, but her body was lifeless and fell to the ground again. As the other elephant family members became more intensely involved in the aid, they tried to put grass into Tina's mouth. Teresia then put her tusks beneath Tina's head and front quarters and proceeded to lift her. As she did so, her right tusk broke completely off, right up to the lip and nerve cavity. The elephants gave up trying to lift Tina but did not leave her; instead, they began to bury her in a shallow grave and throw leaves over her body. They stood over Tina for the night and then began to leave in the morning. The last to leave was Teresia.

Because elephants are so closely knit and highly matriarchal, a family can be devastated by the death of another (especially a matriarch), and some groups never recover their organization. Cynthia Moss has observed a mother, after the death of her calf, walk sluggishly at the back of a family for many days.

Edward Topsell stated in his publication The History of Four-Footed Beasts in 1607, "There is no creature among all the Beasts of the world which hath so great and ample demonstration of the power and wisdom of almighty God as the elephant." Elephants are believed to be on par with chimpanzees with regard to their cooperative skills.

== Elephant altruism ==
Elephants are thought to be highly altruistic animals that even aid other species, including humans, in distress. In India, an elephant was helping locals lift logs by following a truck and placing the logs in pre-dug holes upon instruction from the mahout (elephant trainer). At a certain hole, the elephant refused to lower the log. The mahout came to investigate the hold-up and noticed a dog sleeping in the hole. The elephant only lowered the log when the dog was gone. When an elephant is hurt, other elephants (even if they are unrelated) aid them.

Moss has often seen elephants going out of their way to avoid hurting or killing a human, even when it was difficult for them (such as having to walk backwards to avoid a person). Joyce Poole documented an encounter told to her by Colin Francombe on Kuki Gallman's Laikipia Ranch. A ranch herder was walking alongside camels when he came across a family of elephants. The matriarch charged at him and knocked him over with her trunk, breaking one of his legs. In the evening, when he did not return, a search party was sent in a truck to find him. When the party discovered him, he was being guarded by an elephant. The animal charged the truck, so they shot over her and scared her away. The herdsman later told them that when he could not stand up, the elephant used her trunk to lift him under the shade of a tree. She guarded him for the day and would gently touch him with her trunk.

== Self-medication ==
Elephants in Africa self-medicate by chewing on the leaves of a tree from the family Boraginaceae, which induces labour. Kenyans also use this tree for the same purpose.

== Death ritual ==
Scientists often debate the extent to which elephants feel emotion. Elephants have been one of few species of mammals other than Homo sapiens sapiens and Neanderthals known to have or have had any recognizable ritual around death. Elephants show a keen interest in the bones of their own kind (even unrelated elephants that have died long ago). They are often seen gently investigating the bones with their trunks and feet while remaining very quiet. Sometimes elephants that are completely unrelated to the deceased still visit their graves.

Elephant researcher Martin Meredith recalls in his book an occurrence of a typical elephant death ritual as witnessed by Anthony Hall-Martin, a South African biologist who had studied elephants in Addo, South Africa, for over eight years. The entire family of a dead matriarch, including her young calf, were all gently touching her body with their trunks, trying to lift her. The elephant herd were all rumbling loudly. The calf was observed to be weeping and made sounds that sounded like a scream, but then the entire herd fell silent. They then began to throw leaves and dirt over the body and broke off tree branches to cover her. They spent the next two days quietly standing over her body. They sometimes left to get water or food, but they would always return.

Occurrences of elephants behaving this way around human beings are common throughout Africa. On many occasions, they have buried dead or sleeping humans or aided them when they were hurt. Meredith also recalls an event told to him by George Adamson, a Kenyan game warden, regarding an old Turkana woman who fell asleep under a tree after losing her way home. When she woke up, there was an elephant standing over her, gently touching her. She kept very still because she was very frightened. As other elephants arrived, they began to scream loudly and buried her under branches. She was found the next morning by the local herdsmen, unharmed.

George Adamson also recalls when he shot a bull elephant from a herd that kept breaking into the government gardens of northern Kenya. George gave the elephant's meat to local Turkana tribesmen and then dragged the rest of the carcass half a mile (800 m) away. That night, the other elephants found the body and took the shoulder blade and leg bone and returned the bones to the exact spot the elephant was killed.

== Play ==
Joyce Poole has observed wild African elephants at play on many occasions. They apparently do things for their own and others' entertainment. Elephants have been seen sucking up water, holding their trunk high in the air, and then spraying the water like a fountain.

== Mimicry ==
Recent studies have shown that elephants can also mimic sounds they hear. The discovery was found when Mlaika, an orphaned elephant, would copy the sound of trucks passing by. So far, the only other animals that are thought to mimic sounds are whales, dolphins, bats, primates and birds. Calimero, an African elephant, who, at age 23, exhibited a unique form of mimicry. He was in a Swiss zoo with some Asian elephants. Asian elephants use chirps that are different from African elephants' deep rumbling noises. Calimero also began to chirp and not make the deep calls that his species normally would.

Kosik, an Indian elephant at Everland Amusement Park, South Korea can imitate up to five Korean words, including sit, no, yes and lie down. Kosik produces these human-like sounds by putting his trunk in his mouth and then shaking it while breathing out, similar to how people whistle with their fingers.

Ecologist Caitlin O'Connell-Rodwell conducted research in 1997 which concluded that elephants create low-frequency vibrations (seismic signals) through their trunks and feet to communicate across long distances. Elephants use contact calls to stay in touch with one another when they are out of one another's sight. In 2004, Joseph Soltis conducted a study to understand the low-frequency vocalization elephants used to communicate across short-distances. The research found that closely allied female elephants were more likely to produce 'rumbles' to other members at twice the rate of those who had lesser integrated members. Female elephants are able to remember and distinguish the contact calls of female family and bond group members from those of females outside of their extended family network. They can also distinguish between the calls of family units depending upon how frequently they came across them.

Poole, who worked with the Amboseli Elephant Research Project in Kenya, has demonstrated vocal learning and imitation in elephants of sounds made by each other and in the environment. She began research into whether sounds made by elephants have dialects, a trait that is rare in the animal kingdom.

== Tool use ==
Elephants show a remarkable ability to use tools, using their trunks like arms. Elephants have been observed digging holes to drink water and then ripping bark from a tree, chewing it into the shape of a ball, filling in the hole and covering over it with sand to avoid evaporation, then later going back to drink from the same spot. They also often use branches to swat flies or scratch themselves. Asian elephants have been known to drop large rocks onto an electric fence to break the fence or to cut off the electricity. Asian elephants in India have been known to break electric fences using logs and clear the surrounding wires using their tusks, which do not conduct electricity, to provide a safe passageway.

== Art ==
An elephant trained to paint a picture of another elephant

Like several other species that are able to produce abstract art, elephants, using their trunks to hold brushes, create paintings which some have compared to the work of abstract expressionists. Elephant art is now commonly featured at zoos, and is shown in museums and galleries around the world. Ruby at the Phoenix Zoo is considered the original elephant art star, and her paintings have sold for as much as $25,000. Ruby chose her own colors and was said to have a keen sense of which color she wished to use. The Asian Elephant Art & Conservation Project, an "elephant art academy" in New York, teaches elephants retired from the logging industry to paint. For paintings that resemble identifiable objects, teachers give the elephants guidance. An example of this was shown in the TV program Extraordinary Animals, in which elephants at a camp in Thailand were able to draw portraits with flowers. Although the images were drawn by the elephants, there was always a trainer assisting and guiding the movement.

A popular video showing an elephant painting a picture of another elephant became widespread on Internet news and video websites. The website Snopes, which specializes in debunking urban legends, lists the video as "partly true", in that the elephant produced the brush strokes, but notes that the similarity of the produced paintings is indicative of a learned sequence of strokes rather than a creative effort on the part of the elephant.

== Music ==
It was noted by ancient Romans and Asian elephant handlers (mahouts) that elephants can distinguish melodies. Elephants can also remember tone and recognise more than 20 words. Performing circus elephants commonly follow musical cues, and Adam Forepaugh and Barnum & Bailey circuses even featured "elephant bands". German evolutionary biologist Bernhard Rensch studied an elephant's ability to distinguish music, and in 1957 published the results in Scientific American. Rensch's test elephant could distinguish 12 tones in the music scale and could remember simple melodies. Even though played on varying instruments and at different pitches, timbres and meters, she recognized the tones a year and a half later. These results have been backed up by the Human-Elephant Learning Project which studies elephant intelligence.

An elephant named Shanthi at the National Zoo in Washington D.C. displayed the ability to play the harmonica and various horn instruments. She reportedly always ended her songs with a crescendo.

Recording group Thai Elephant Orchestra is an ensemble of elephants who improvise music on specially made instruments with minimal interaction from their handlers. The orchestra was co-founded by pachyderm expert Richard Lair, who works at the Thai Elephant Conservation Center in Lampang, and David Sulzer (artist name, Dave Soldier) who studies the role of dopaminergic synapses in memory consolidation, learning, and behavior at Columbia University. According to neurobiologist Aniruddh Patel, the orchestra's star drummer named Pratidah, exhibits musicality, stating: "Either when drumming alone or with the orchestra, Pratidah was remarkably steady". He also noted that she developed a swing-type rhythm pattern when playing with other elephants.

== Problem-solving ability ==
Elephant stacking blocks to allow it to reach food

Elephants are able to spend substantial time working on problems. They are able to change their behavior radically to face new challenges, a hallmark of complex intelligence.

=== Problem-solving experiments ===
A 2010 experiment revealed that in order to reach food, "elephants can learn to coordinate with a partner in a task requiring two individuals to simultaneously pull two ends of the same rope to obtain a reward", putting them on an equal footing with chimpanzees in terms of their level of cooperative skills.

A study by Dr. Naoko Irie of Tokyo University has shown that elephants demonstrate skills at arithmetic. The experiment "consist[ed] of dropping varying numbers of apples into two buckets in front of the [Ueno Zoo] elephants and then recording how often they could correctly choose the bucket holding the most fruit." When more than one apple was being dropped into the bucket, this meant that the elephants had to "keep running totals in their heads to keep track of the count." The results showed that "Seventy-four percent of the time, the animals correctly picked the fullest bucket. An African elephant named Ashya scored the highest with an amazing eighty-seven percent … Humans in this same contest managed a success rate of just sixty-seven percent." The study was also filmed to ensure its accuracy.

A study on Discovery News found that elephants, during an intelligence test employing food rewards, had found shortcuts that not even the experiment's researchers had thought of.

=== Adaptive behavior in captivity ===
In the 1970s, at Marine World Africa, USA, there lived an Asian elephant named Bandula. Bandula worked out how to break open or unlock several of the pieces of equipment used to keep the shackles on her feet secure. The most complex device was a Brummel hook, a device that closes when two opposite points are slid together. Bandula used to fiddle with the hook until it slid apart when it was aligned. Once she had freed herself, she would help the other elephants escape. In Bandula's case and certainly with other captive elephants, there was an element of deception involved during the escapes, such as the animals looking around making sure no one was watching.

In another case, a female elephant worked out how she could unscrew iron rods with an eye hole that was an inch (2.5 cm) thick. She used her trunk to create leverage and then untwisted the bolt.

Ruby, an Asian elephant at Phoenix Zoo would often eavesdrop on conversations keepers would have talking about her. When she heard the word paint, she became very excitable. The colors she favored were green, yellow, blue and red. Once, a fire truck came and parked outside her enclosure where a man had just had a heart attack. The lights on the truck were flashing red, white and yellow. When Ruby painted later on in the day, she chose those colors. She also showed a preference for colors that the keepers wore.

Harry Peachey, an elephant trainer, developed a cooperative relationship with an elephant named Koko. Koko would help the keepers out, "prompting" them to encourage him with various commands and words that Koko would learn. Peachey stated that elephants are almost predisposed to cooperate and work with humans as long as they are treated with respect and sensitivity. Koko worked out when his keepers needed a bit of "elephant help" when they were transferring the females of the group to another zoo. When the keepers wanted to transfer a female, they would usually say her name, followed by the word transfer (e.g., "Connie transfer"). Koko soon figured out what this meant. If the keepers asked an elephant to transfer and it did not budge, they would say, "Koko, give me a hand." When he heard this, Koko would help. After 27 years of working with elephants, Peachey firmly believes that they can understand the semantics and syntax of some of the words they hear. This is something thought to be very rare in the animal kingdom.

According to one source, elephants can figure out how to retrieve distant objects that they cannot otherwise reach by using a stick.

=== Adaptive behavior in the wild ===
In the wild, elephants display clever methods of finding resources. Elephants have powerful olfactory senses and long memories, and when evaluating foraging locations, respond more strongly to long‐term patterns of productivity than to immediate forage conditions. In times of scarcity, they return to areas which have been reliable over many years rather than the last sites visited. They also favor travelling on dirt roads in the dry season, as easy walking terrain to conserve energy.

Although it is common for herbivores to find salt licks or to ingest inorganic matter for sodium, elephants in the Mount Elgon National Park, Kenya, have learned to venture deep into Kitum Cave to utilize its minerals in what has been described as 'quarrying' and 'salt mining'. Although the elephants clearly do not understand that they require salt in their diet, they show interest only in the cation-rich zeolite, tusking it into smaller edible fragments. This activity is performed in groups, and years of tusk marks indicate the knowledge of the cave has been passed down over generations. Poaching has caused the elephants to alter their behavior and avoid the more widely known caves.

== Applying the string-drawing task to elephants ==
In 1956, W. H. Thorpe explained:

The ability to pull up food which is suspended by a thread, the pulled in loop being held by the foot while the bird reaches with its beak for the next pull, is doubtfully inborn and it has been subject to many experiments. The act appears at first sight to be a real and sudden solution of the problem from the start, and thus to qualify for inclusion under 'insight learning.' Successful performance in this task has been documented in well over ten bird species.

More recently, Bernd Heinrich and Thomas Bugnyar concluded that ravens' "behaviour in accessing meat on a string is not only a product of rapid learning but may involve some understanding of cause–effect relation between string, food and certain body parts." String-pulling behavior has been likewise studied in seven Asian elephants by presenting them with a retractable (bungee) cord. In this setup, the cord is tied to a heavy log a few meters away from the elephant. A sugarcane (a favorite elephant treat) is attached to the cord, and can only be retrieved by repeated, coordinated, action of the trunk and another body part. The results were clearcut:

All seven logging elephants fully mastered the string-drawing sequence within 1–3 experimental sessions. In all cases of retractable rope pulling, the sequence involved pulling by the trunk, and then securing the rope by either foot or mouth. After 2–6 coordinated pulls, while still holding the rope with either mouth or foot, the elephants disengaged the sugarcane from the rope while still using mouth or forefoot as an anchor, and then consumed the sugarcane. All elephants seemed to be flexible about the use of anchor, interchangeably using mouth, foreleg, or both.

== Self-awareness ==
Elephants have joined a small group of animals, including great apes, bottlenose dolphins and Eurasian magpies, that exhibit self-awareness. The study was conducted with the Wildlife Conservation Society (WCS) using elephants at the Bronx Zoo in New York. Although many animals respond to a mirror, very few show any evidence that they recognize it is in fact themselves in the mirror reflection.

The Asian elephants in the study also displayed this type of behavior when standing in front of a 2.5-by-2.5-metre (8.2 ft × 8.2 ft) mirror – they inspected the mirror and brought food close to the mirror for consumption.

Evidence of elephant self-awareness was shown when the elephant Happy (in the Bronx Zoo) repeatedly touched a painted X on her head with her trunk, a mark which could only be seen in the mirror. Happy ignored another mark made with colorless paint that was also on her forehead to ensure she was not merely reacting to a smell or feeling.

Frans De Waal, who ran the study, stated, "These parallels between humans and elephants suggest a convergent cognitive evolution possibly related to complex society and cooperation."

=== Self-awareness and culling ===
There has been considerable debate over the issue of culling African elephants in South Africa's Kruger National Park as a means of controlling the population. Some scientists and environmentalists argue that it is "unnecessary and inhumane" to cull them since "elephants resemble humans in a number of ways, not least by having massive brains, social bonds that appear to be empathetic, long gestations, high intelligence, offspring that require an extended period of dependent care, and long life spans." A South African animal rights group asked in a statement anticipating the announcement, "How much like us do elephants have to be before killing them becomes murder?"

Others argue that culling is necessary when biodiversity is threatened. However, the protection of biodiversity argument has been rejected by animal rights advocates and conservationists who argue that the greatest threat to biodiversity comes from human beings.

== Arguments against intelligence ==
This section summarizes experiments that cannot be readily reconciled with the view that elephants are highly intelligent. These experiments, in turn, rely on pioneering early work with dogs and cats.

=== Discrimination tasks ===
Edward Thorndike argued that his cats and dogs escaped puzzle boxes through a mindless process of trial and error. Because understanding something as simple as pulling a loop to open a door must occur rapidly or not at all, it should have induced, at some point during the repeated introductions of his animals into the box, a sudden reduction in escape time. The actual, gradual, slope of the time-curve that he did observe suggested to him that his subjects failed to understand the cause-effect relationships between their actions and escape.

In 1957, researchers reported that a young Asian elephant needed 330 trials, over a period of several days, to consistently choose the reinforced response in her first discrimination task. In an experiment which employed another sense modality, an 8-year-old took 7.5 months to distinguish 12 tones.

Similarly, in discrimination experiments with Asian elephants in the logging camps of Myanmar, only 13 Burmese elephants mastered black/white or large/small visual discrimination tasks, while 7 elephants failed to master the task.

Like Thorndike's cats and dogs, the 13 elephants that did master a black/white or large/small discrimination task did so gradually, over several sessions. The slope of the time-curve again suggested the elephants failed to understand the cause-effect relationships between lid removal and food retrieval.

The pre-training that preceded these Myanmar discrimination experiments involved learning to remove a lid from a bucket or to displace a box to uncover a hole in the ground. On average, the 20 elephants required 3.4 sessions to master the pre-training task.

=== Possible absence of causal reasoning ===
Thorndike's dogs and cats learned to escape a box by, for instance, pulling a loop attached to a string that opened the box. On subsequent introductions to an open box when string-pulling no longer served a purpose, the animal continued to pull a string before getting out of the box. Thorndike concluded that the animal solved the task mechanically, without understanding the causal link between string-pulling and escaping.

A conceptually similar experiment involved pre-training four logging Asian elephants to remove food from a cover-less bucket by inserting their trunk into the bucket. Next, a treat was placed at the bottom of a bucket and, at the same time, the bucket was covered with a lid. The elephants were then trained to obtain the treat by removing the lid. Once this behavioral sequence was established, a treat was placed inside the bucket and, at the same time, the lid was placed on the ground alongside the bucket, so that the lid no longer obstructed access to the food. Despite the bucket being open, elephants continued to move the lid before retrieving the treat.

As in the Thorndike case, if elephants can understand the nature of the task, they should ignore the lid on the ground and retrieve the reward directly, as they used to do in pre-training sessions before the lid was introduced. But if they fail to understand the causal link between lid removal and food retrieval, they might continue to remove the lid before retrieving the food. The observations supported Thorndike's mechanical learning hypothesis. An alternative explanation that has yet to be tested, is compliance. That the elephants perceive the trainer's expectations, and comply by moving the lid before retrieving the food, in order to do what they perceive is expected of them. Distinguishing between these two explanations could support or falsify whether elephants have a theory of mind.

== See also ==
- Animal cognition
- Elephant communication
- Spindle neuron
- Tool use
- Vocal learning
- Pig intelligence
- Beehive fence
