= Elephant art =

Elephant art may refer to:

- Art by elephants, paintings etc. made by elephants
- Art depicting elephants, pictures etc. showing elephants
