= Joyce Poole =

American scientist

Joyce Hatheway Poole (born 1 May 1956) is a biologist, ethologist, conservationist, and co-founder/scientific director of ElephantVoices. She is a world authority on elephant reproductive, communicative, and cognitive behavior.

Poole graduated from Smith College in 1979 with a degree in biological sciences and received her PhD in animal behavior from the University of Cambridge in 1982. She began her research with Cynthia Moss in Amboseli in 1975, focusing on male elephants, which culminated in her Cambridge dissertation on the sexual and aggressive phenomenon of musth in male elephants, entitled, Musth and male-male competition in the African elephant. In the mid-1980s Poole and Katherine (Katy) Payne worked together in Amboseli studying elephant vocal communication. This collaboration led to the discovery that African elephants use powerful, very low frequency calls to communicate with one another over long distances.

Poole has worked as a postdoctoral research fellow at Princeton University, head of the Elephant Program at Kenya Wildlife Service, and Scientific Director of ElephantVoices, which she co-founded with husband Petter Granli in 2002. Over decades Poole has been a vocal advocate for elephant conservation and welfare. She has received several awards for her work, including the Smith College Medal and Jackson Hole Wildlife Film Festival Outstanding Lifetime Achievement Award.

== Early life ==
Poole was born in Germany in 1956 to American parents, Robert Keyes Poole and Julie Ann Hatheway. Her father, a graduate of Yale, 1954, began his career teaching history at the Taft School. From there he was recruited in 1962 to join the US Peace Corps as country director first in Malawi and then in Kenya. In the early 1970s he initiated and ran the Smithsonian Peace Corp Environmental Program and then returned to Kenya to head the African offices of the African Wildlife Foundation. Poole's mother graduated from Smith College, 1954, and held numerous volunteer positions in Africa and the United States throughout her life. Poole has a brother, Emmy Award Winning nature cinematographer, Robert (Bob) C. Poole and a sister, Virginia H. Poole, who holds a PhD in health services research from the Department of Health Policy and Management at Johns Hopkins University.

Poole spent the first six years of her life in Connecticut at the Taft School, where her father was teaching. With her family Poole moved first to Malawi in 1962 and then to Kenya in 1965, where she grew up spending holidays in the national parks. At the age of six while on safari in Amboseli National Park, Kenya, their car was charged by a bull elephant. This made an impression on her. In 1966, when she was 11 years old, she went to one of primatologist Jane Goodall's lectures on her research with chimpanzees, and made a determination to become an animal behavior researcher.

== Career ==
Poole began her career in 1975, working with Cynthia Moss in Amboseli, where she focused on male African elephants. Her early observations led to her discovery of musth, a period of heightened reproductive activity and aggression, in African elephants. Her long-term documentation described the physical and behavioral characteristics and temporal patterning of musth among individual males, as well as the role of musth and longevity in reproductive success.

In the mid-1980s Poole pursued postdoctoral research at Princeton University, working under Daniel Rubenstein. During this time, she continued her studies on the behavior of musth males while concurrently beginning to study elephant acoustic communication. During this period, she collaborated with Payne, leading to the discovery that the low frequency rumble vocalizations of African elephants contain infrasonic frequencies, below the range of human hearing. They postulated that elephants use powerful rumbles to communicate with one another over long distances.

In 1990, she became the head of the Elephant Program for the Kenya Wildlife Service, where she worked for four years. She played a pivotal role in developing and implementing elephant conservation and management policies across the country and in training a team of young Kenyan elephant conservationists.

During the mid-1990s, Poole worked as a consultant for various organizations, including Richard Leakey & Associates, the World Bank, and the International Union for the Conservation of Nature. Her efforts were focused on advising, training, and raising awareness about elephant conservation. Additionally, she wrote a memoir Coming of Age with Elephants, published in 1996.

In 2002, she co-founded ElephantVoices with her husband Granli, with the mission "to inspire wonder in the intelligence, complexity and voices of elephants, and to secure a kinder future for them". In 2008, ElephantVoices was registered as a non-profit 501(c)3 organization in California dedicated to elephant research, conservation, education and advocacy.

Poole co-developed the Elephant Charter, outlining principles for the ethical treatment of elephants. Poole and Granli also designed citizen science projects and digital tools that allowed people to submit observations of individual elephants through the use of customized apps to online databases. Among notable initiatives were the Elephant Partners project in the Maasai Mara ecosystem, and the Gorongosa Elephant Project in Gorongosa National Park in Mozambique, each with dedicated Who's Who & Whereabouts Databases and related smartphone apps as scientific tools, which enabled access to life history, social and locational information on individual elephants.

Through their work at ElephantVoices, in 2021 Poole and Granli launched a fully searchable comprehensive Elephant Ethogram, a public database detailing African elephant behaviors and communication. This extensive resource, defining approximately 322 behaviors and 103 behavioral suites with written descriptions, images, sounds and over 2,400 video examples, was meticulously curated through tens of thousands of hours of field observations.

== Research ==
Poole's work has focused on various aspects of elephant social structures, communication methods, and cognitive abilities. She has conducted in-depth studies on social and reproductive behaviors in elephants. She explored topics such as the persistence of effects of social disruption in elephants, leadership in elephants, mate guarding, rutting behavior, and the adaptive value of age in male elephants. Her research has shed light on the complexities of elephant societies, including coalition formations and cooperation among family members.

A significant portion of Poole's research has been dedicated to understanding elephant communication. She has investigated acoustic and gestural communication, examining the use of vocalizations and body language in various contexts. Her studies have delved into topics such as elephant vocal learning, olfactory communication, and elephants' ability to classify human ethnic groups by odor and garment color. Poole's work has also explored the intentional use of signals, such as ostensive communication, where elephants emphasize the importance of specific messages within their groups.

Poole's research has contributed to the field of cognitive science by exploring elephant cognition and decision-making processes. Her studies have provided evidence of intentional, goal-directed actions among elephants, showcasing their ability to work together to achieve common objectives. This research highlights the elephants' independent agency, self-determination, and autonomy, demonstrating their sophisticated cognitive abilities. She has documented empathetic behaviors among elephants, including mourning rituals and cooperative problem-solving activities.

These observations emphasize the emotional depth and social bonds within elephant communities, underscoring the importance of empathy in their interactions. Poole's work has also highlighted the impact of poaching on the behavior and culture of elephants. Publications in the 2020s document these effects, including the consequences of systematic killing on populations, such as trauma, PTSD, behavioral abnormalities, culturally-learned behavior - such as aggression, and an increase in tusklessness in females.

== Advocacy ==
Poole played a crucial role in documenting the devastating impact of poaching on elephants, particularly in the 1970s and 1980s. Her work contributed significantly to raising awareness about the issue, ultimately leading to the 1989 international ban on the ivory trade. This ban was a significant milestone in the fight against the illegal ivory trade.

Poole has served as an expert witness in multiple court cases related to elephant welfare, particularly focusing on the cruelty associated with holding elephants in captivity. Her expert testimony provided valuable insights into the mistreatment and welfare of elephants held in captivity. Through her involvement in legal proceedings, she contributed to the efforts aimed at improving the living conditions and treatment of elephants in captivity and ending the import of elephants from the wild.

=== Specific cases ===
In 1998, Poole testified as an expert witness in the case of NSPCA v. Riccardo Ghiazza in South Africa. The case involved the capture and mistreatment of 34 baby elephants. Ghiazza was eventually found guilty of cruelty, highlighting the importance of ethical treatment of captive elephants.

In 2005, Poole provided her expertise via video link in the case of International Fund for Animal Welfare, et al. v. Minister for the Environment and Heritage et al., N2005/916. The case focused on the export of Asian elephants from Thailand to Australia, underscoring concerns about the welfare of elephants during international transfers.

In 2008, Poole testified in Washington DC in the case of ASPCA vs. Ringling Brothers and Barnum & Bailey Circus. Her involvement in this case highlighted the welfare issues related to elephants in circuses, contributing to the ongoing debate about the ethical treatment of animals in entertainment. Ringling Brothers no longer uses elephants.

In 2012, Poole testified in Los Angeles in the case of Aaron Leder vs. John Lewis, City of Los Angeles, concerning the welfare of the elephants at the Los Angeles Zoo. Her testimony provided valuable insights into the living conditions and treatment of elephants in a zoo environment, raising awareness about the ethical concerns associated with keeping elephants in captivity.

Poole is an expert witness for the ongoing Nonhuman Rights Project, a civil rights organization based in the United States that works to secure rights for nonhuman animals.

== Personal life ==
Poole splits her time between Sandefjord, Norway; Olchoro Onyore, Kajiado County, Kenya; and field sites. She is married to Petter Granli, who is co-founder/CEO of ElephantVoices. They have one adult daughter, Selengei. Granli has a son, Thomas Conradi Granli from his previous marriage.

== Honors and awards ==
Poole has received several honors and awards in recognition of her contributions to the field of elephant research, conservation, and advocacy and is a National Geographic Explorer. Some of the notable honors and awards she has received include:

- Horace Dutton Taft Medal (2017)
- Outstanding Lifetime Achievement Award: Jackson Hole Wildlife Film Festival (2015)
- Certificate of Recognition: California State Legislature and Assembly (2007)
- Smith College Medal: Smith College (1996)
- American Society of Mammalogists Brazier Howell Award (1979)

In addition to these honors and awards, Joyce Poole has been invited to speak at many international meetings and symposia, showcasing her expertise in the field of elephant social behavior, communication and conservation. Her engagements have included events at institutions like the National Geographic Society and Explorer's Club.

Poole's research and conservation work has also been featured in various media presentations, including printed articles, books, radio programs, and television.

Poole's research and conservation work have been featured in various publications, including Reader's Digest, Scientific American, National Geographic Kids, National Geographic, The New York Times and numerous other media outlets around the world. Poole's life and work have been featured in several books, including Jodi Picoult's novel Leaving Time (2014), Martin Meredith's biography Africa's Elephant (2001), and Doug Chadwick's Fate of the Elephant (1992).

Poole has been interviewed and her research has been featured on a variety of local and international radio programs, including NPR and BBC Radio. Her work has been featured in close to 100 television documentaries, such as Disney's "Secrets of the Elephants" (2023), National Geographic's "Mind of a Giant" (2016), PBS's "Gorongosa Park: Rebirth of Paradise" (2015), "An Apology to Elephants" (2013), "War Elephants" (2012) and BBC productions like "Elephant's Talk."

== Published works ==
=== Books ===
- Poole, Joyce (Mar 28, 1996). Coming of Age With Elephants: A Memoir. Hyperion. ISBN 978-0786881918.
- Poole, Joyce (1997). Elephants. Colin Baxter Photography. ISBN 978-0896583573.

=== Peer-reviewed scientific articles ===
Poole has authored more than 40 peer-reviewed scientific articles published in journals such as Nature, Science, Frontiers in Zoology, Biology Letters, Proceedings of the Royal Society B, Immunogenetics, and PLoS ONE.

=== Book chapters ===
Poole's scientific work has been featured in chapters of peer-refereed books, including titles like "Mammals of Africa" (2013), "The Amboseli Elephants: A Long-Term Perspective on a Long-Lived Mammal" (2011), and "Elephants and Ethics: Toward a Morality of Co-existence" (2003).

=== Symposia proceedings ===
Poole's research findings have been published in peer-reviewed symposia proceedings, such as "Vocal Imitation in African Savannah Elephants" (2006) and "Elephant Mate Searching: Group Dynamics and Vocal and Olfactory Communication" (1989).

=== Popular articles ===
Poole has authored 14 popular articles in publications like National Geographic's blog "A Voice for Elephants".
