= Sharon Pincott =

Elephant naturalist and conservationist

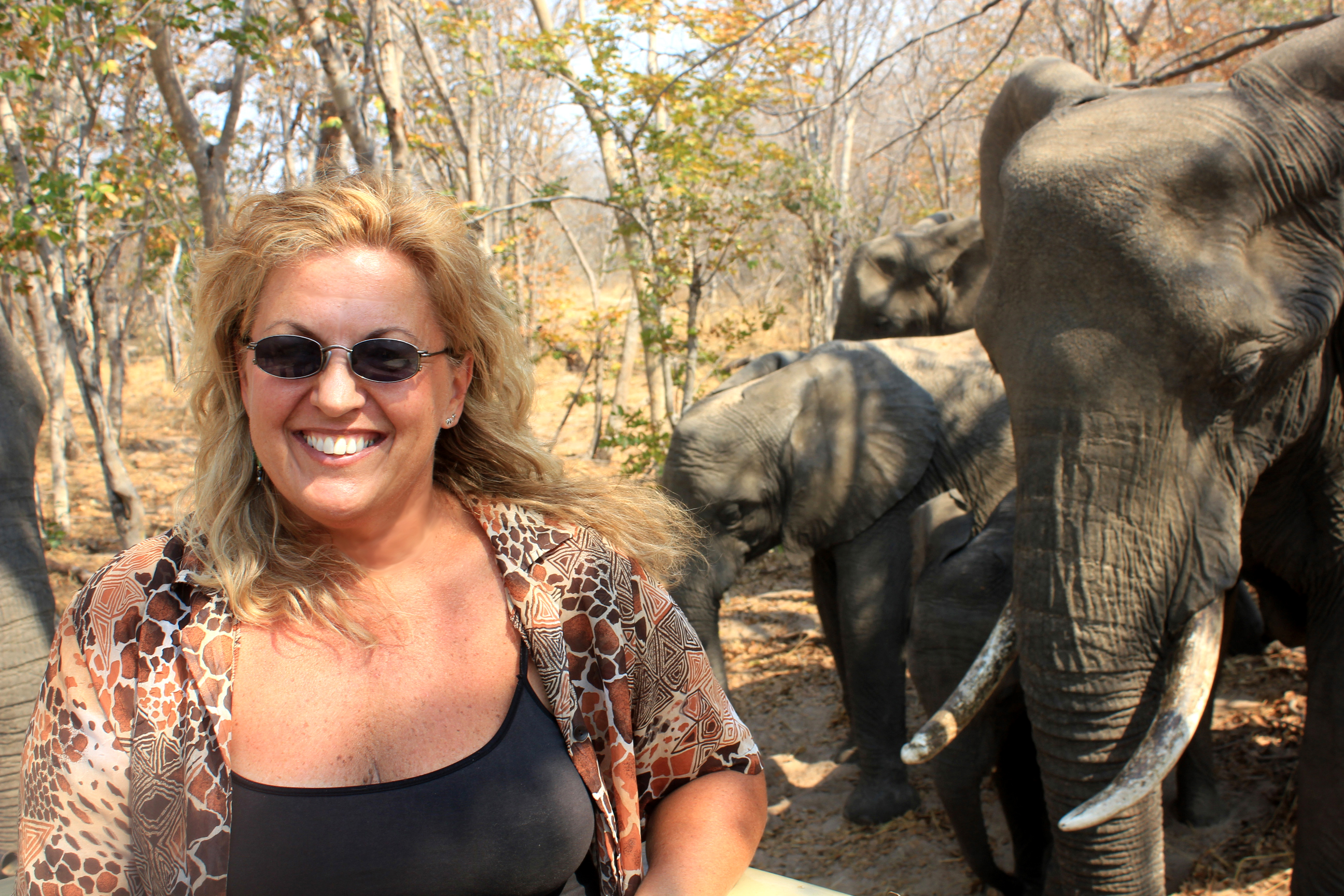
- Pincott in Hwange, Zimbabwe, 2012
- Born: Sharon Schulz; May 1962 (age 64); Queensland, Australia
- Other names: 'Thandeka Mandlovu' : (Ndebele for Much-loved Mother Elephant), 'The Elephant Guardian'
- Occupations: Naturalist; Wildlife Conservationist; Elephant behavioural specialist; Author; Ex-IT Consultant
- Known for: Working with the Presidential Elephants of Zimbabwe, Hwange 2001–2014
- Notable work: Elephant Dawn – 2016 book; All the President's Elephants (La Gardienne des Éléphants) – 2012 doco; Battle for the President's Elephants – 2012 book; The Elephants and I – 2009 book, now re-released with the title The Elephants and Me
- Website: sharonpincott.com

Sharon Pincott is an Australian author and specialist in African elephant behaviour. She has studied the social structure and population dynamics of a single clan of wild elephants extensively, and advocates for ending both the ivory trade and the ripping of young elephants from their mothers for sale to zoos, in addition to promoting conservation awareness.

== Background ==
Pincott grew up in the small town of Grantham, Queensland in the Lockyer Valley Region in Australia's east. She originally worked in the field of Information technology (IT) and progressed to the position of National Director of IT for Ernst & Young Australia based in Sydney, before becoming an IT Consultant which allowed her the freedom to travel more often to Africa, and to realize her passion and concern for elephants.

== Zimbabwe-focused work ==
Pincott worked alone, on a full-time voluntary, primarily self-funded basis, for 13 years (2001–2014) with the clan of wild, free-roaming, elephants known as the Presidential Elephants of Zimbabwe on land bordering the Main Camp entrance to Hwange National Park. She initiated a project named The Presidential Elephant Conservation Project and eventually acquired a reputation for being able to "talk to the elephants".

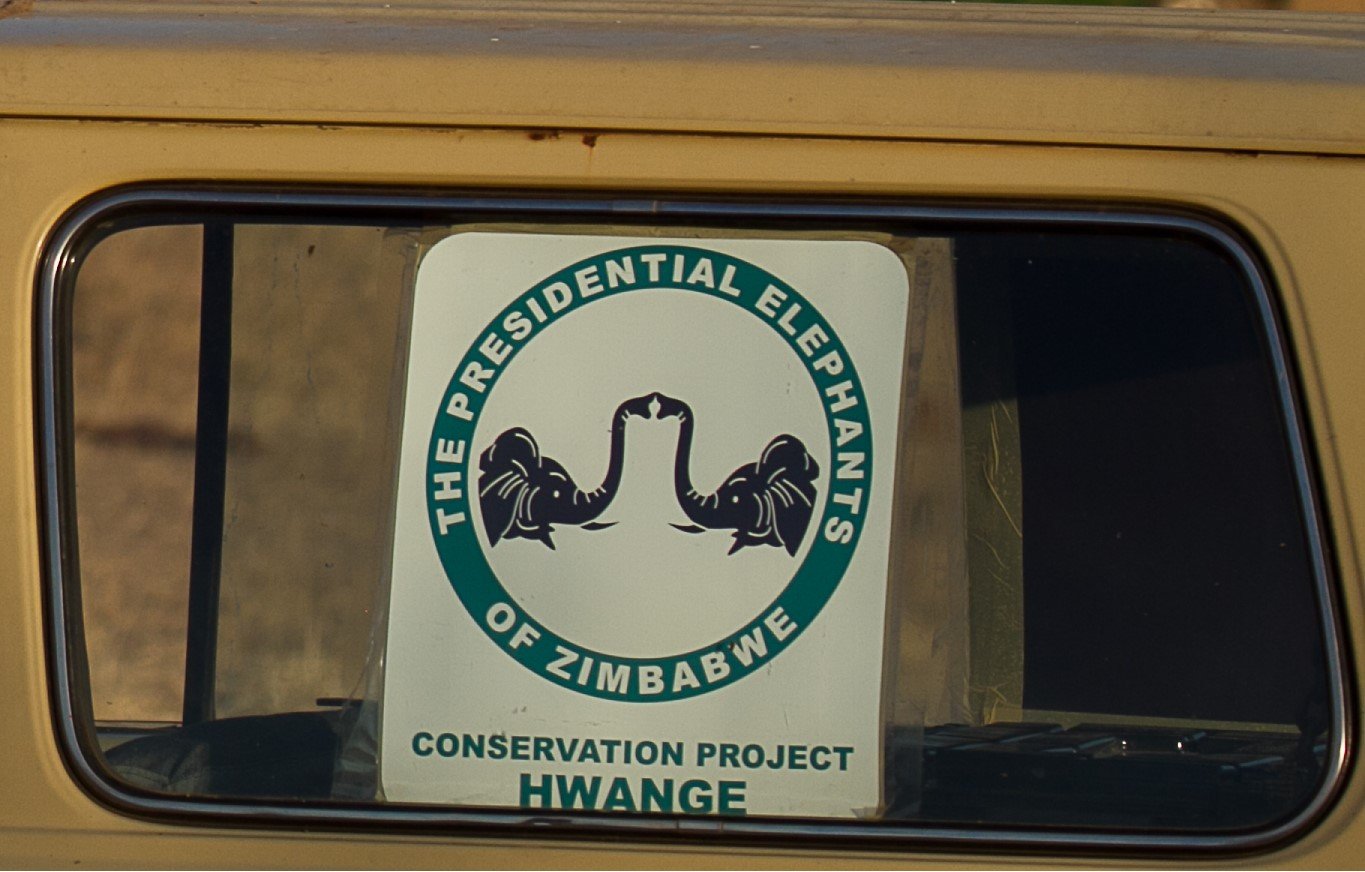
Sharon Pincott's Presidential Elephants of Zimbabwe project logo

In 2009, eight years after arriving in Zimbabwe, Pincott was appointed South Africa Getaway magazine's 'Elephant Ambassador in Africa' "in recognition of her courageous work with wildlife in Hwange". Pincott subsequently came to the attention of Natural History Unit Africa and became the subject of the documentary titled All the President's Elephants.

This All the President's Elephants documentary was filmed with Pincott in Hwange in 2011. It is the story of Pincott's life, work and intimate relationship with the Presidential Elephants of Zimbabwe, showcasing these Hwange elephants and some of the problems they, and conservationists working in the field to help protect wildlife, often face. It includes her wire snare removal work with colleagues called in to dart injured elephants using a tranquillizer gun. It also features Pincott's work successfully recommending and encouraging President Robert Mugabe to reaffirm his commitment to this clan of elephants, in an effort to secure their future.

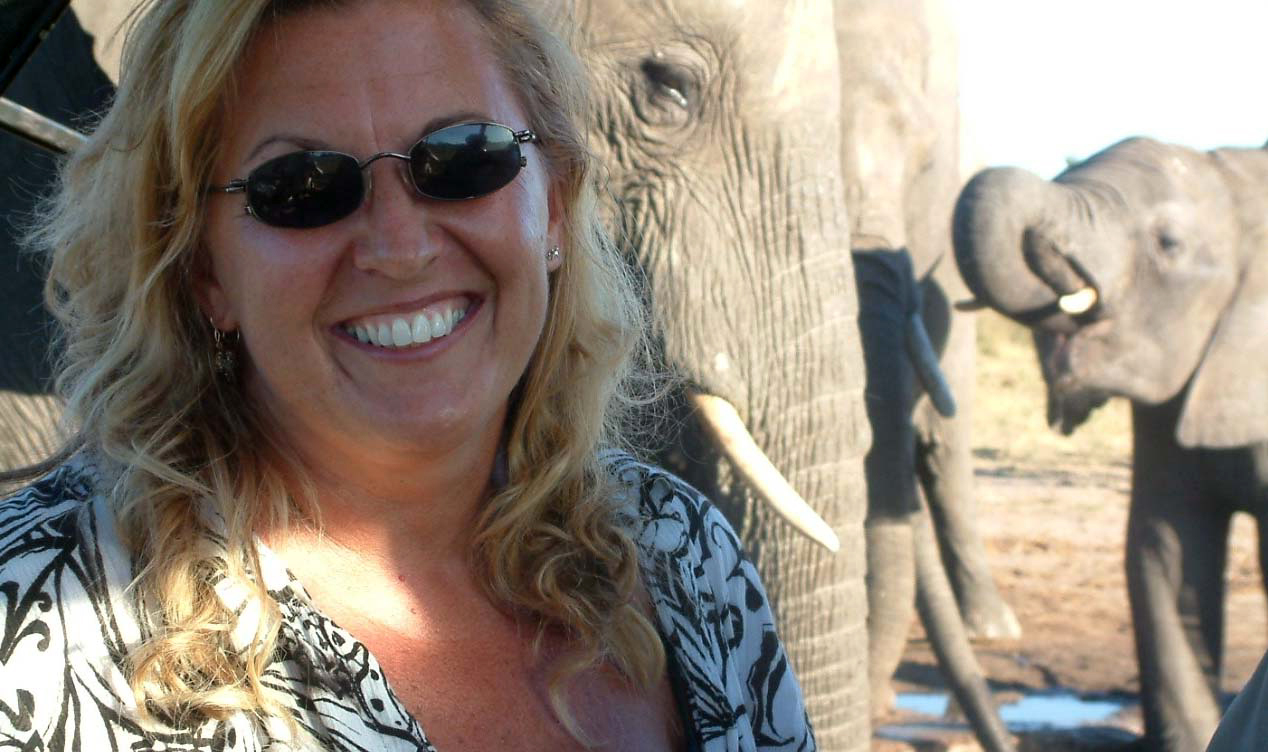
Sharon Pincott in Hwange (2009)

From December 2017 Pincott was active in voicing widespread opposition to scores of young elephants being captured, forcibly taken from their mothers and families inside Hwange National Park and transported to Chinese zoos, appealing to Zimbabwe's new President Emmerson Mnangagwa for an immediate review of policy and ultimately delivering a petition that attracted 287,509 signatures.

Her elephant conservation work has been profiled in National Geographic, BBC Wildlife and Africa Geographic. She has been interviewed by writers for Intrepid Explorer magazine, South Africa The Zimbabwean newspaper, The Sydney Morning Herald, Travel Africa magazine., and the October/November 2016 edition of Forbes Woman Africa magazine, amongst others.

== Author ==
She has published three books: The Elephants and I (Jacana Media, South Africa 2009) - now out of print, and available online under the new title The Elephants and Me, Battle for the President's Elephants (Jacana Media, South Africa 2012) and Elephant Dawn (first published by Allen & Unwin, Australia 2016, and then by Jacana Media, South Africa 2016). She is also the author of two earlier elephant works which she released by Self-publishing in Zimbabwe, In An Elephant's Rumble (2004, ISBN 079742864X) and A Year Less Ordinary (2006, ISBN 0797431667).

In 2019, Pincott was one of 42 people, working for the protection of African elephants, selected to contribute a chapter to the landmark coffee table book, The Last Elephants, compiled and edited by South African investigative journalist Don Pinnock, and associate Colin Bell. Pincott’s contribution is titled Learning from Zimbabwe’s Presidential Elephants, which summarizes the highs and lows of her years working with these wild Hwange elephant families. In its Introduction from Kensington Palace, HRH William, Prince of Wales writes in part: “At the current pace of illegal poaching, when [his daughter] Charlotte turns 25 the African elephant could be gone from the wild … we cannot let this happen.” He offers encouragement to those like Pincott working for the welfare of elephants to "move fast and effectively to conserve our natural heritage". In its Preface, Pincott and several of her colleagues are named as “the Jane Goodalls and Dian Fosseys of the elephant world.”

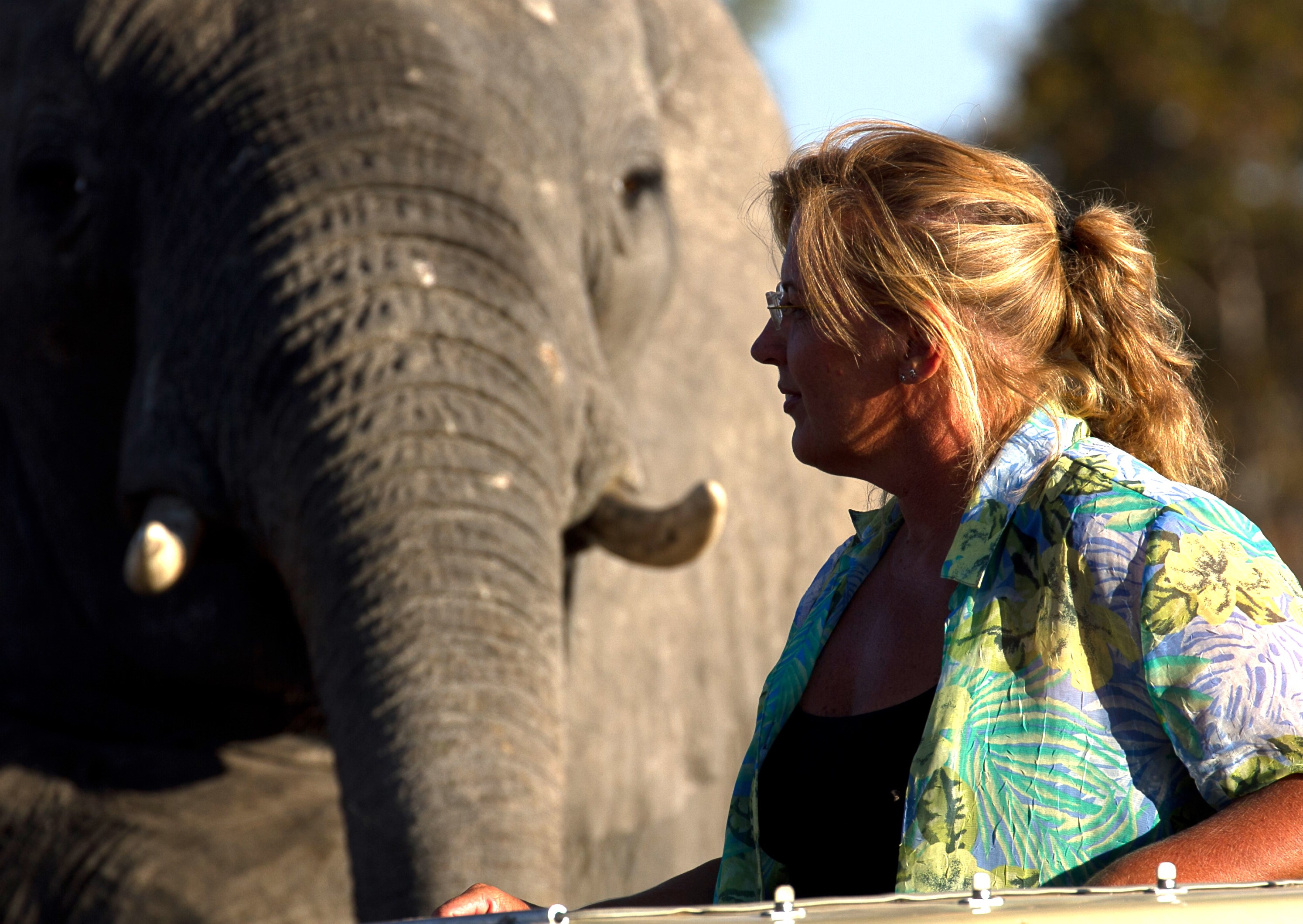
Sharon Pincott with her elephants in Hwange, Zimbabwe

== Ivory trade, Sport-hunting, Cyanide poisoning, Land grabs and associated harassment ==
In her latest memoir, Elephant Dawn, written and published after Pincott finally fled Zimbabwe in late 2014, she shares some of the threats, intimidation and risks that she endured while fighting for the elephants’ welfare. These include being accused by the local Governor (who later became a government Cabinet Minister) of being a Spy, working for the Australian government, tasked with bringing down Land reform in Zimbabwe. She was punched in the face by a government Minister’s son over an illegal land grab of protected elephant land, an assault case she won in court. She found herself on a publicly displayed Police Wanted Person’s list for a period of over 12 months, despite living just a few miles from the local police station. Although constantly harassed, she was never charged with anything.

For World Wildlife Day 2017 Pincott collaborated with the International Fund for Animal Welfare in an attempt to help bring an end to the Ivory trade. On International Women's Day 2017 Pincott was acknowledged by associates of the Wildlife Preservation Society of Queensland, Australia, as "blazing a trail for elephants as well as women working in conservation". In late March 2017, almost 3 years after leaving her Hwange elephant work, Pincott was still being acknowledged by the Zimbabwe press for her "profound dedication to the Presidential Elephants", in a country increasingly known for hostility towards conservationists who speak out against wildlife-related corruption. In May 2017, after a male big-game hunter was crushed to death in Hwange when an adult female elephant, felled by gunfire, landed on him, Pincott reasoned in an interview that it was "likely" to be a known Presidential Elephant female that was shot in this hunting party incident, and highlighted the ongoing ineffectuality of Mugabe's Presidential Decree, and how unethical sport-hunting can be. It was at this time that she once again became involved in raising awareness about a new deadly bout of cyanide poisoning in Hwange.

== Health ==
In 2017 Pincott revealed that she was suffering from rare, incurable, autoimmune connective tissue diseases believed by medical researchers to be both environment- and stress-related. Pincott shares the same debilitating and progressive Autoimmune Disease with Canadian singer Celine Dion, called Stiff Person Syndrome. Amongst numerous other health problems, she also suffers from a second one-in-a-million Autoimmune condition called Scleredema of Buschke Type 2 (not to be confused with Scleroderma, although these do share some symptoms). She continues to do what she can for the welfare of elephants from afar, as her health allows.
