= Echo (elephant) =

Elephant matriarch

- Born: c. 1944; Amboseli National Park, Kenya
- Died: 3 May 2009 (aged 64–65)

Echo was an African bush elephant matriarch who was studied for over 30 years by ethologist Cynthia Moss, beginning in 1973, and was the subject of several books and films. She was the first subject of the Amboseli Elephant Research Project, the longest-running study of a land mammal. The study of Echo and her family contributed significantly to the understanding of elephants, including their life-cycles, methods of communication, emotional lives, and cooperative care of the young.

Echo died on 3 May 2009, around 64 or 65 years of age.

== History ==
Echo was the matriarch of the EB herd, which was associated with the EA herd. Its members were given names starting with the letter E and Echo was named after the sound of the radio collar that Cynthia Moss fitted her with in 1973, the year Moss began tracking her. Echo became a matriarch at the age of 23. Elephant matriarchs make life and death decisions on behalf of their extended family, such as when to leave a drought area, where to go, and when to leave an injured family member. It is unusual for a 23-year-old elephant to become a matriarch.

Echo had at least eight calves, facilitating Moss' ability to document elephant cooperative care of young. In 1990, Echo gave birth to Ely, who provided a case-study for the emotional connections between family members. The large calf had become cramped in the womb during the 22-month pregnancy and was born with rigid carpal joints, making it almost impossible for him to walk. The condition made it a substantial risk for the herd to care for him, as they were forced to forgo food to do so. Nonetheless, the herd stayed with Ely for many days, until he was better able to walk.

Ely provided scientists with additional evidence of elephant emotional bonds when he was wounded by a spear at the age of seven. Veterinarians attempted to tranquilize him, but were initially chased off by Echo and several other family members. Moss relates that gunshots fired over their heads did not deter the family from trying to protect Ely. Neither did Echo's need to care for a new calf. Ely was eventually treated by the veterinary team and survived. Biologist Marc Bekoff advances these examples of Echo's behavior to argue that elephants have complex emotional lives, and their families should not be broken up for zoos and circuses.

Echo's family continues to be a primary research subject of the Amboseli researchers. After her death, the family split into two, with one faction led by her sister Ella (now led by Elettra, following Ella's passing in 2021), and the other by her daughter Enid.

Echo was the subject of several documentaries by PBS and the BBC. Cynthia Moss has written several books about her and her extended family, including Echo of the Elephants: The Story of an Elephant Family and Elephant Memories: Thirteen Years in the Life of an Elephant Family.

== See also ==
- List of individual elephants
