= Elephant communication =

Communication between elephants

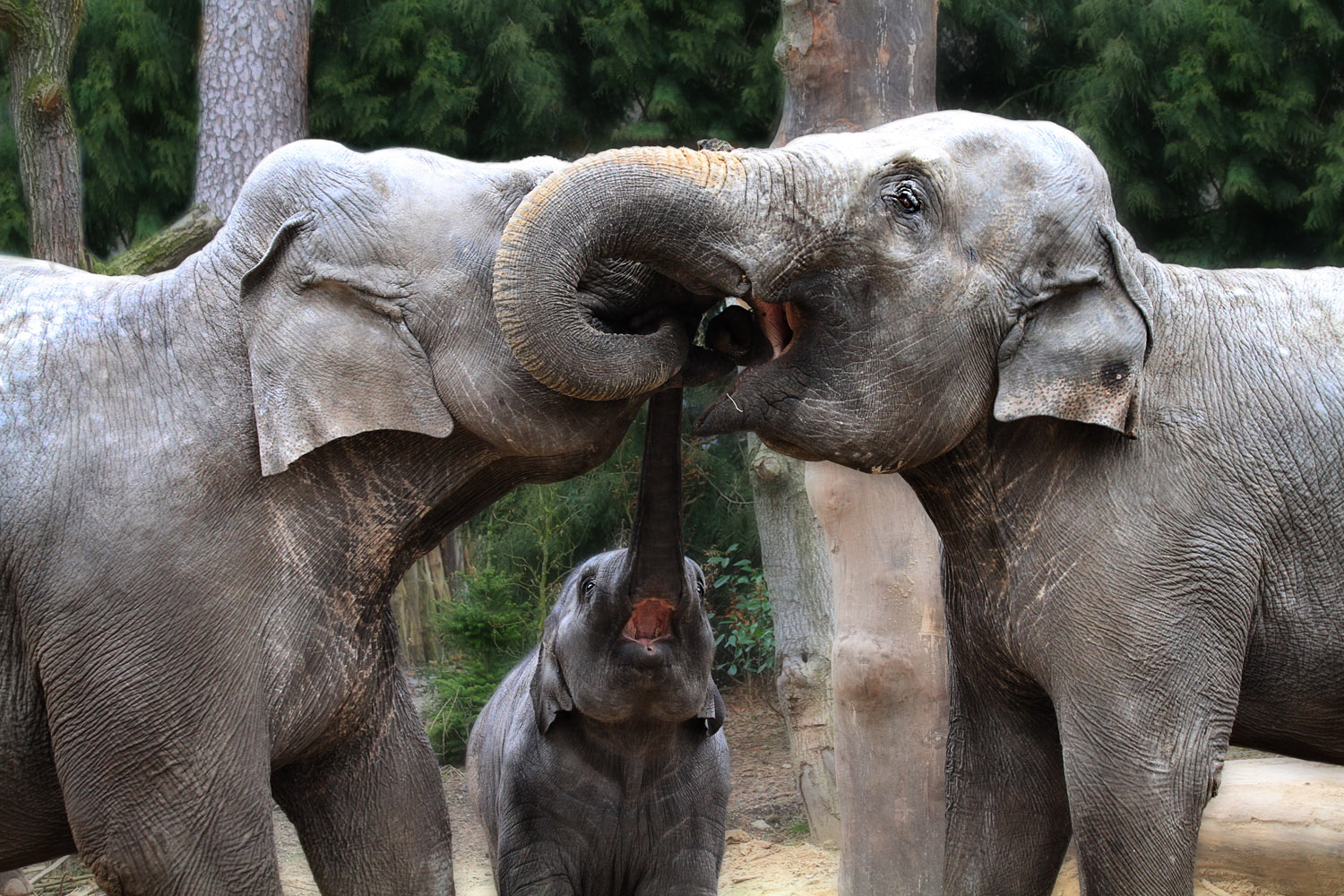
Asian elephants greeting each other by inter-twining their trunks

Elephants communicate via touching, visual displays, vocalisations, seismic vibrations, and semiochemicals.

== Tactile ==
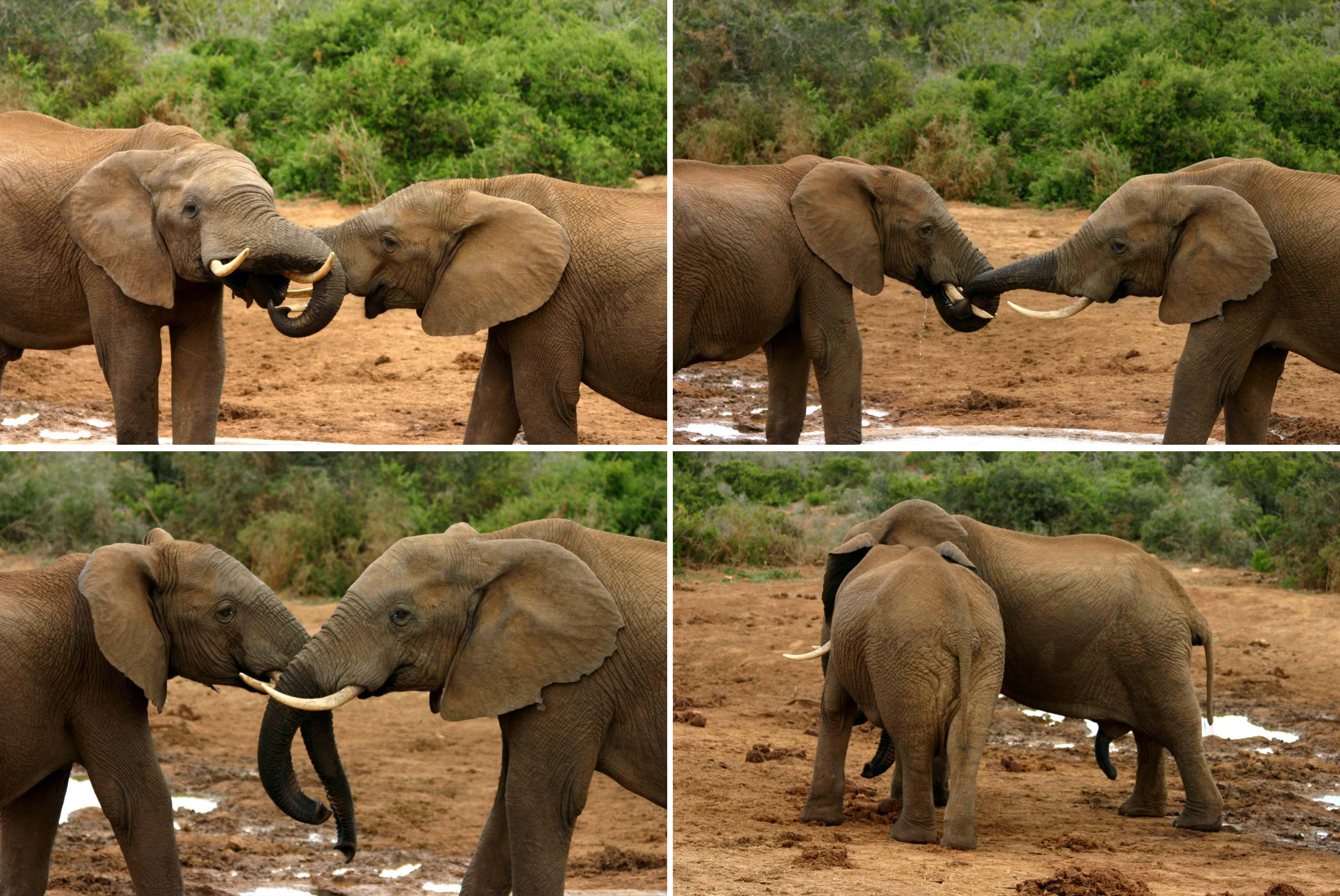
Elephant (Loxodonta africana) mating ritual composite, Addo Elephant Park, South Africa

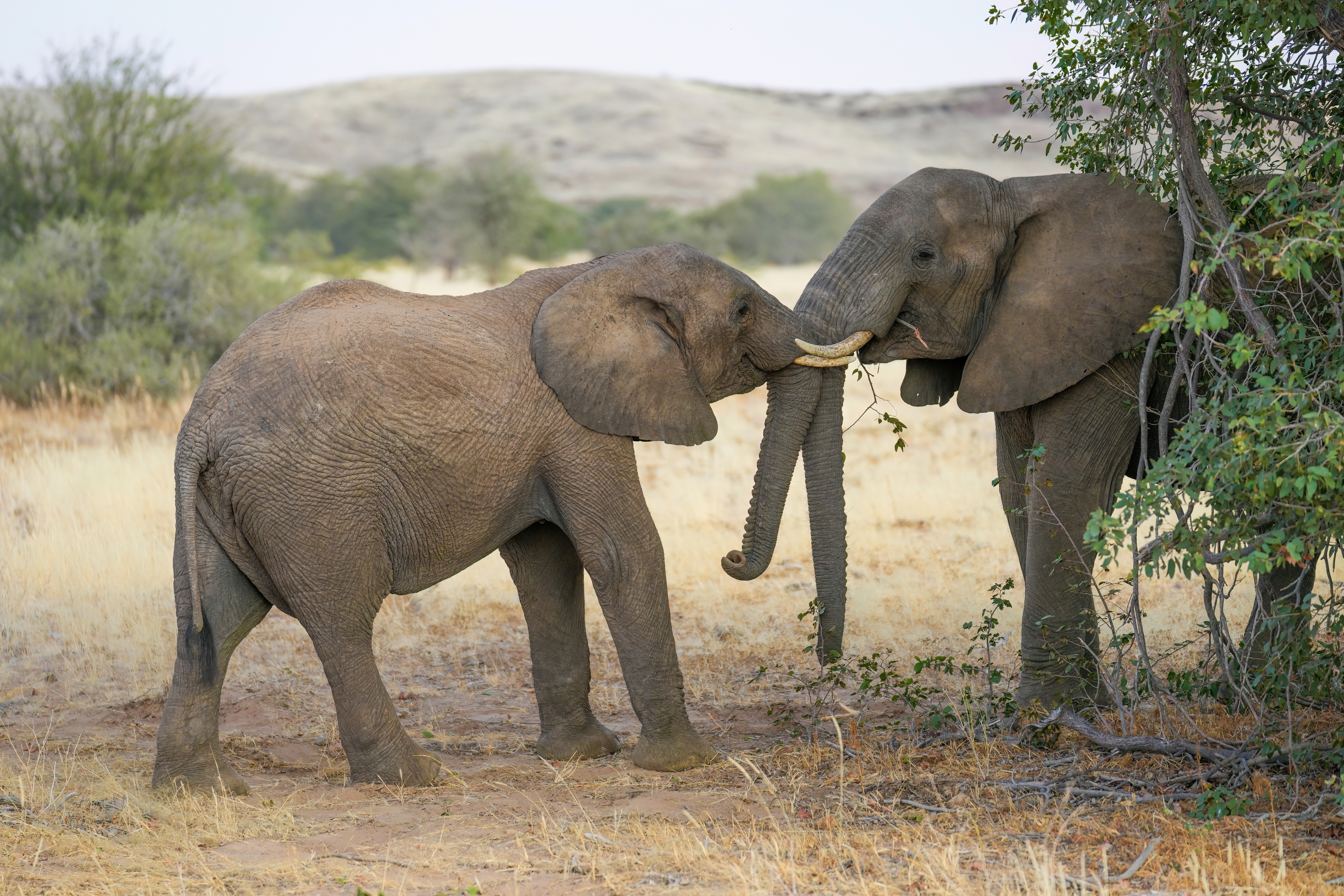
Desert-adapted elephants cuddling in Damaraland, Namibia

Individual elephants greet each other by stroking or wrapping their trunks; the latter also occurs during mild competition. Older elephants use trunk-slaps, kicks, and shoves to discipline younger ones. Individuals of any age and sex will touch each other's mouths, temporal glands, and genitals, particularly during meetings or when excited. This allows individuals to pick up chemical cues. Touching is especially important for mother–calf communication. When moving, elephant mothers will touch their calves with their trunks or feet when side-by-side or with their tails if the calf is behind them. If a calf wants to rest, it will press against its mother's front legs and when it wants to suckle, it will touch her breast or leg.

== Visual ==
Visual displays mostly occur in agonistically behavioural situations. Elephants will try to appear more threatening by raising their heads and spreading their ears. They may add to the display by shaking their heads and snapping their ears, as well as throwing dust and vegetation. They are usually bluffing when performing these actions. Excited elephants may raise their trunks. Submissive ones will lower their heads and trunks, as well as flatten their ears against their necks, while those that accept a challenge will position their ears in a V shape.

== Acoustic ==
Elephants produce several sounds, usually through the larynx, though some may be modified by the trunk. Perhaps the most well-known call is the trumpet which is made by blowing through the trunk. Trumpeting is made during excitement, distress or aggression. Fighting elephants may roar or squeal, and wounded ones may bellow.

Asian elephants have been recorded to make three basic sounds: growls, squeaks, and snorts. Growls in their basic form are used for short-distance communication. During mild arousal, growls resonate in the trunk and become rumbles; for long-distance communication, they escalate into roars. Low-frequency growls are infrasonic and made in many contexts. Squeaks come in two forms; chirpings and trumpets. Chirping consists of multiple short squeaks signaling conflict and nervousness. Trumpets are longer, louder squeaks produced during extreme arousal. Snorts signal changes in activity and become louder during mild or strong arousal. During the latter case, when an elephant bounces the tip of the trunk it creates booms which serve as threat displays.

=== Infrasound ===
Elephants can produce infrasonic calls which occur at frequencies less than 20 Hz. Infrasonic calls are important, particularly for long-distance communication, in both Asian and African elephants. For Asian elephants, these calls have a frequency of 14–24 Hz, with sound pressure levels of 85–90 dB and last 10–15 seconds. For African elephants, calls range from 15 to 35 Hz with sound pressure levels as high as 117 dB, allowing communication for many kilometres, with a possible maximum range of around 10 km (6 mi).

Low frequency rumble visualised with acoustic camera.

At Amboseli National Park several different infrasonic calls have been identified:

- Greeting rumble – emitted by adult females of a family group that are reuniting after having several hours apart.
- Contact call – soft, unmodulated sounds made by a separated individual up to 2 km (1.2 mi) away from the group.
- Contact answer – response to the contact call; starts loud, then softens.
- "Time to go" rumble – a soft rumble emitted by the matriarch to signal other herd members to move to another spot.
- Musth rumble – distinctive, low-frequency pulsated rumble emitted by musth (rutting) males, nicknamed the "motorcycle".
- Female chorus – a low-frequency, modulated chorus by several cows in response to a musth rumble.
- Postcopulatory call – made by an oestrous cow after mating.
- Mating pandemonium – calls of excitement made by a cow's family after she has mated.

=== Names and recognition ===
In 2024 machine learning was used to investigate elephants' personal names. Research published in Nature Ecology and Evolution demonstrated that elephants call each other by distinct vocalized names and respond when they hear others call their name. Researchers analyzed hundreds of elephant calls recorded over more than a year in Kenya, applying machine learning to distinguish specific sounds by which elephants call each other. When recorded calls were played back, elephants responded to the sound of their friends or family members calling their name by either calling back or moving toward the speaker. This behavior suggests that elephants may be capable of abstract thought and possess a vocabulary that extends beyond names. This research might eventually enable humans to communicate directly with elephants, possibly warning them about dangers such as poachers.

=== Anatomy of the vocal tract ===
The larynx of the elephant is the largest known among mammals. The vocal folds are long and are attached close to the epiglottis base, longer and thicker than those of humans. In addition, they are tilted at 45 degrees and positioned more anteriorly. They produce varied and complex vibrations as the vocal folds and vocal tract interact to modulate the fundamental frequency.

One of these vibratory phenomena is alternating A-P (anterior-posterior) and P-A traveling waves (self-maintained oscillations) arising within the large larynx with its unique glottal opening/closing pattern. Two biomechanical features assist these traveling waves: a low fundamental frequency and increasing longitudinal tension in the vocal folds. Phonation begins in the larynx at around 6 kPa tracheal pressure, and laryngeal tissue starts to vibrate at 15 kPa.

== Seismics ==
Elephants are known to communicate with seismics, vibrations produced by impacts on the earth's surface or acoustical waves that travel through it. They appear to rely on their leg and shoulder bones to transmit the signals to the middle ear. When detecting seismic signals, the animals lean forward and put more weight on their larger front feet; this is known as the "freezing behaviour". Elephants possess several adaptations suited for seismic communication. The cushion pads of the feet contain cartilaginous nodes and have similarities to the acoustic fat found in marine mammals such as toothed whales and sirenians. A unique sphincter-like muscle around the ear canal constricts the passageway, thereby dampening acoustic signals and allowing the animal to hear more seismic signals.

Elephants appear to use seismics for a number of purposes. An individual running or mock charging can create seismic signals that can be heard at great distances. When detecting the seismics of an alarm call signalling danger from predators, elephants enter a defensive posture and family groups will pack together. Seismic waveforms produced by locomotion appear to travel distances of up to 32 km (20 mi) while those from vocalisations travel 16 km (10 mi).

== Semiochemicals ==
Elephants can also communicate through olfaction and semiochemicals. Secretion of semiochemicals can occur through feces and urine as well as the temporal gland, a structure that is derived from sweat glands and located on both sides of the head of male and female elephants. The substance secreted by male elephants from their temporal glands during musth contains many chemicals and seems to be of interest to females. Elephants may investigate and detect semiochemicals through the vomeronasal organ (VNO). Elephants may go through several steps of investigating the smell of a surface with their trunk before inserting its tip into their mouth to touch the anterior part of their hard palate and thus transfer semiochemicals to the VNO.
