= Amboseli National Park =

National park in Kajiado County, Kenya

- Hifadhi ya Taifa ya Amboseli
- IUCN category II (national park)
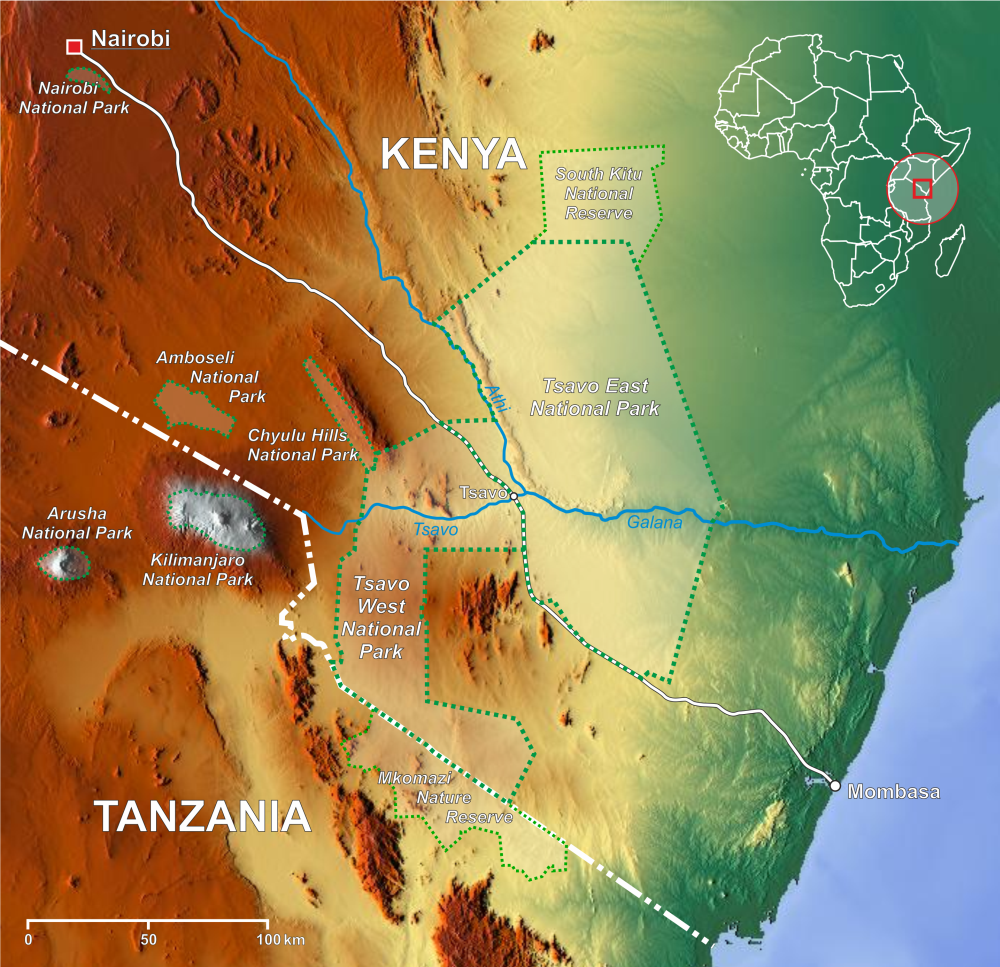
- Location within Tsavo national parks Location within Kenya
- Location: Loitoktok District, Kajiado County, Kenya
- Nearest city: Nairobi
- Coordinates: 02°38′29″S 37°14′53″E
- Area: 392 km^{2} (151 sq mi)
- Established: 1906; 120 years ago; as a reserve; 1974; 52 years ago; as a national park
- Visitors: 120,000 estimated (in 2006)
- Governing body: Kenya Wildlife Service, Olkejuado County Council and the Maasai community

Amboseli National Park, formerly Maasai Amboseli Game Reserve, is a national park in Loitoktok District in Kajiado County, Kenya. It measures 392 km^{2} (151 sq mi) in size at the core of an 8,000 km^{2} (3,100 sq mi) ecosystem that spreads across the Kenya-Tanzania border. It harbours 400 species of birds including water birds like pelicans, kingfishers, crakes, hamerkop and 47 raptor species. The local people are mainly Maasai.

The park protects two of the five main swamps and includes a dried-up Pleistocene lake and semiarid vegetation.

== History ==
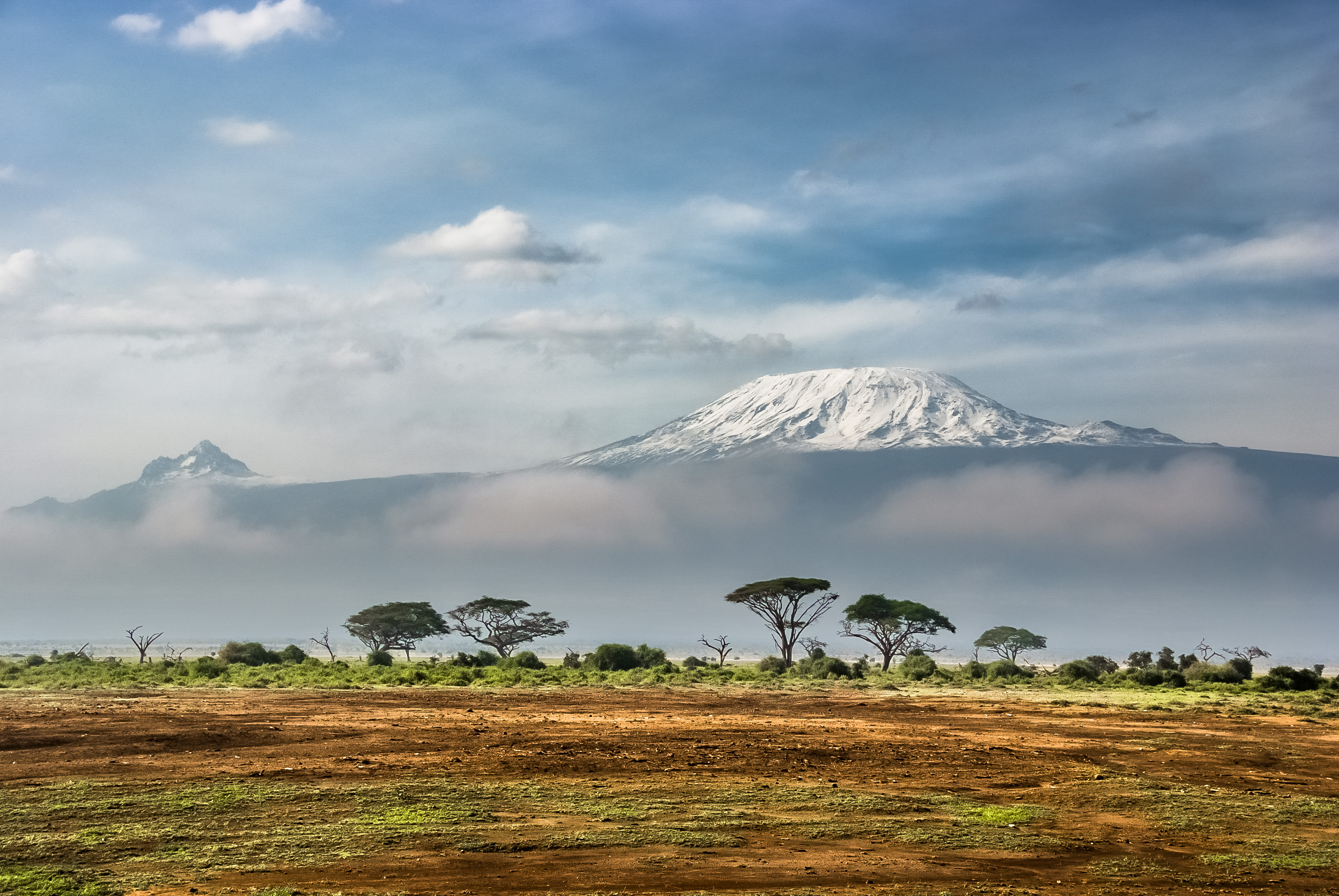
Mount Kilimanjaro is in the background.

In 1883, Jeremy Thompson was the first European to penetrate the feared Maasai region known as Empusel (meaning 'salty, dusty place' in Maa). He, too, was astonished by the fantastic array of wildlife and the contrast between the arid areas of the dry lake bed and the oasis of the swamps, a contrast that persists today.

Amboseli was set aside as the Southern Reserve for the Maasai in 1906 but returned to local control as a game reserve in 1948. Gazetted a national park in 1974 to protect the core of this unique ecosystem, it was declared a UNESCO site in 1991. The park earned $3.5 M (€2.9 M) in 2005. On 29 September 2005, Kenyan President Mwai Kibaki declared that control of the park should pass from the Kenya Wildlife Service to the Olkejuado County Council and the Maasai tribe. Some observers saw this as a political favour in advance of a vote on a new Kenyan constitution; legal challenges are currently in court. The degazetting would divert park admission fees directly to the county council with shared benefits to the Maasai immediately surrounding the park.

== Wildlife ==
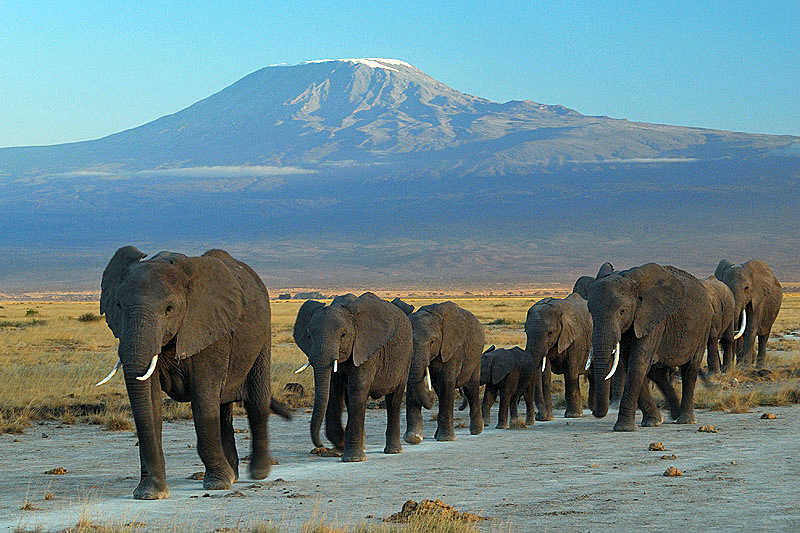
Elephants in Amboseli National Park with Mount Kilimanjaro in the background

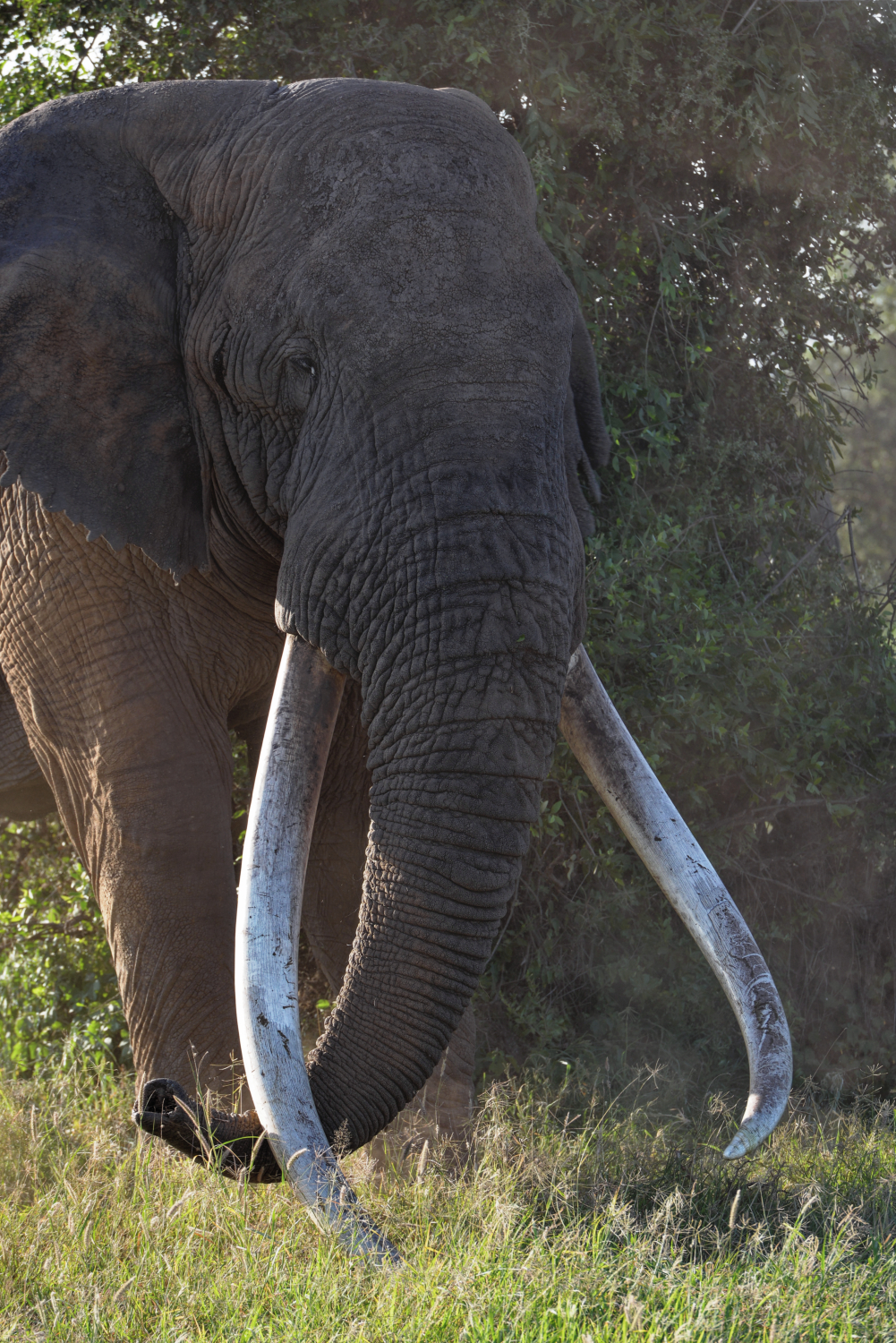
"Tim" the Elephant at Amboseli National Park

Amboseli National Park is best known for its large population of African bush elephants, who have been studied since 1972 by American ethologist and conservationist Cynthia Moss. The park was home to Echo, the most researched elephant in the world, and the subject of many books and documentaries, followed by Dr. Moss for almost four decades. Echo died in 2009 when she was about 60 years old.

In addition to elephants, Amboseli hosts between 50 and 80 other species of mammal, including yellow baboon, Cape buffalo, impala, Southeast African lion, East African cheetah, spotted hyena, Masai giraffe, Grant's zebra, and eastern white-bearded wildebeest. Many large and small birds can also be found.

== See also ==
- Amboseli Elephant Research Project
- Amboseli Baboon Research Project
