= Amboseli Elephant Research Project =

Research project on African elephants in southern Kenya

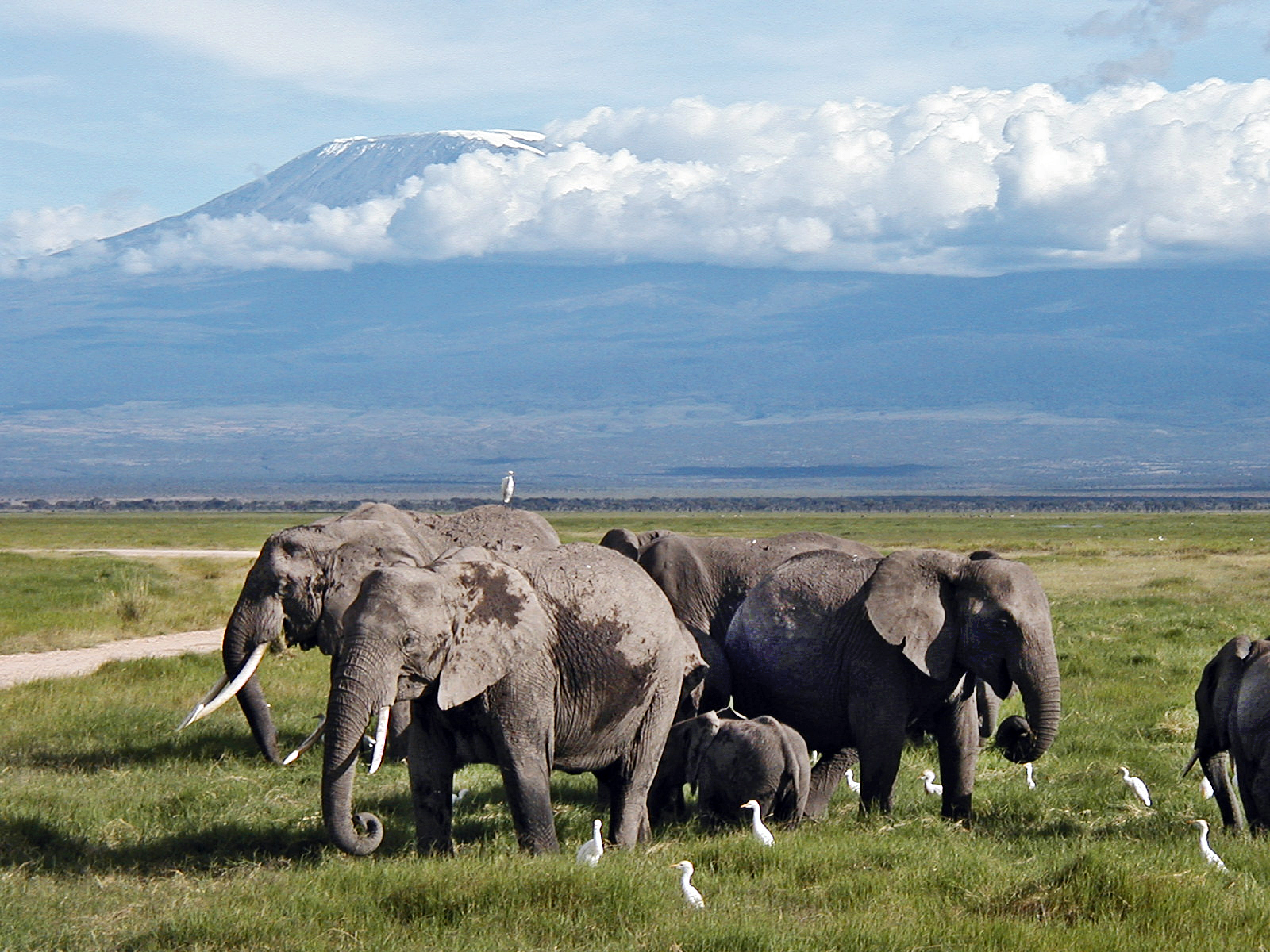
African Elephants in Amboseli National Park.

The Amboseli Elephant Research Project is a long-term research project on the ethology of the African elephant, operated by the nonprofit Amboseli Trust for Elephants. The project studies the elephant's social behavior, age structure and population dynamics. It is the longest running study of elephant behavior in the wild, and has gathered data on life histories and association patterns for more than 2,000 individual elephants.

The research project was initiated in 1972 by Cynthia Moss and Harvey Croze in Amboseli National Park in the south of Kenya. Relatively few poachers have been active in Amboseli Park's approximately 390 km² area. This is especially due to the Maasai people, and the constant presence of tourists and researchers. Thus, Amboseli is one of the few regions in Africa where the age structure of elephants has remained undistorted. The area is monitored by game wardens and scientists throughout the year.

The subjects of the Amboseli Elephant Research Project, mostly notably the elephant matriarch Echo, have been described at length in documentaries on PBS and Animal Planet.
