= Cynthia Moss =

American ethologist and conservationist

- Born: Cynthia Jane Moss; July 24, 1940 (age 86); Ossining, New York
- Education: Smith College (1962)
- Years active: 1972–present
- Known for: Study of African savanna elephants, conservation, animal welfare

Cynthia Jane Moss (born July 24, 1940) is an American ethologist and conservationist, wildlife researcher, and writer. Her studies have concentrated on the demography, behavior, social organization, and population dynamics of the African elephants of Amboseli. She is the director of the Amboseli Elephant Research Project, and is the program director and trustee for the Amboseli Trust for Elephants (ATE).

== Life and work ==
=== Early life and education ===
Cynthia Jane Moss was born in Ossining, New York on July 24, 1940. Her father, Julian, was a publisher of several small-town newspapers, and her mother, Lillian, left her work as a legal secretary to raise Cynthia and her older sister, Carolyn.

Moss's appreciation for nature began early as her love for horseback riding allowed her to explore and observe the outdoors. She began riding horses at the age of 7, and by age 12, she had her own horse, Kelly. Her passion for horseback riding led her to attend Southern Seminary, a private boarding school with a distinguished riding program during her junior and senior years.

She attended Smith College where she took many classes in arts and literature, and where she earned her B.A. in philosophy in 1962.

=== Career ===
In 1964, she was hired as a news researcher and reporter for Newsweek, where she did interviews on religion and theater.

In 1967, Moss took a leave of absence so she could see the African continent herself, which had been described to her in letters by her college friend, Penny Naylor, who had recently moved to Africa. It was on this trip that Moss visited British elephant researcher Dr. Iain Douglas-Hamilton's camp in Lake Manyara National Park in northern Tanzania, which is where she "became completely hooked on elephants." While she enjoyed working for Newsweek, the following year, she quit her job and moved to Africa to become a research assistant for Douglas-Hamilton, because "the pull of Africa was stronger".

In these studies, they discovered that elephants could be identified by their ears because no two elephant's ear shapes, or combinations of markings and veins, were alike, which Moss describes in her first book Portraits in the Wild. She continued to work with Douglas-Hamilton until the fall of 1968, when his project ended and he returned to England.

Although her work with Douglas-Hamilton had ended, Moss was determined to stay in Africa and continue studying and working with the wildlife. To gain the experience and credentials she needed to begin her own study of elephants, she worked with Sue and Tony Harthoorn in Nairobi, Kenya as a veterinary assistant, assisted in research on plains animals and elephant feeding behavior in Tsavo National Park, and became an editor for the newsletter of the African Wildlife Foundation (AWF), Wildlife News.

In 1972, Moss was encouraged by ecologist David "Jonah" Western to consider studying the last undisturbed elephant herd in Africa, in the Amboseli National Park in Kenya. So in September, Moss teamed up with Harvey Croze, and they began the Amboseli Elephant Research Project (AERP). The first step they took was to catalog pictures of the elephants which would aid them in keeping track of and recognizing different elephants.

In 1974, their budget was scarce and Harvey Croze left for other work. In 1975, Moss published her book Portraits in the Wild, which gave her respect in the field, and aided her in receiving a $5,000 grant from the AWF, thus allowing her to devote nearly all of her time to the study of the elephants of Amboseli. That year, Moss set up camp in the park and began to gather information on the elephant's behavior, daily movements, and relationships. The TC and TD family units are the main subjects of her book Elephant Memories: Thirteen Years in the Life of an Elephant Family (1988). 1975 also marked the beginning of a period of very low rainfall in the Amboseli region, which took a significant toll on the elephants, but also gave Moss a clear view of elephant behavior in times of drought.

Moss focused on elephant conservation in the late 1980s as she saw the elephant population halved by poaching for ivory and loss of habitat. And thanks to her work combined with many others and conservation groups, the African Elephant was placed on the Endangered species list in October of 1989 and in January of 1990, the sale of ivory was prohibited.

In 2001, she created the Amboseli Trust for Elephants (ATE), which is a non-profit trust, which focuses on elephant conservation, management, and policy-setting.

Moss is most famous for her study of Echo, an elephant matriarch who has been the subject of Moss's book Echo of the Elephants: The Story of an Elephant Family (1993) along with several documentaries. Moss's studies have given a remarkable insight into the way elephants live, showing that they live in a highly organized, multi-tiered society that is led by a matriarch.

The studies and findings of Moss and her team are reported and summarized in The Amboseli Elephants: A Long-Term Perspective on a Long-Lived Mammal.

=== Awards ===
Moss has received many awards in recognition of her dedication to the study of elephants in Amboseli including the Smith College Medal for Alumnae Achievement (1985), MacArthur Genius Fellowship (2001), and the Conservation Award from the Friends of the National Zoo and the Audubon Society. In addition, she has made four award-winning documentaries about elephants including An Apology to Elephants (2013) – HBO, Echo: An Elephant to Remember (2010) – PBS, Nature, Echo and Other Elephants (2008) – BBC, David Attenborough, and Echo of the Elephants (2005) – PBS, Nature. In 2019 she received an honorary doctorate from Yale University.

== See also ==
- Ethology
- Elephant cognition
