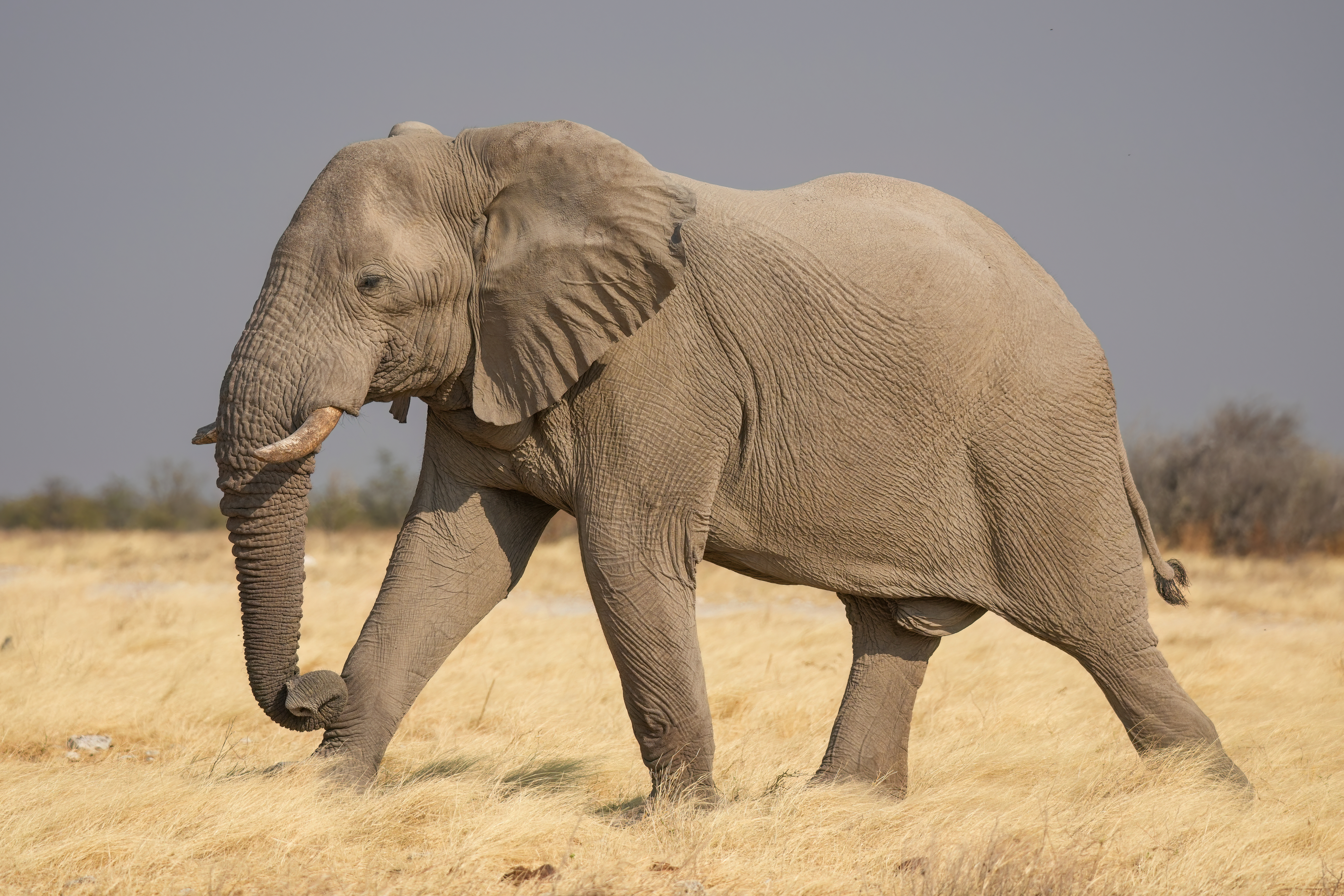
- Adult male in Etosha National Park, Namibia

Conservation status
- Endangered (IUCN 3.1)
- CITES Appendix I (Note: The populations of Botswana, Namibia, South Africa, and Zimbabwe are listed in Appendix II for control of commercial trading, though they are not necessarily threatened with extinction.)

Scientific classification
- Kingdom: Animalia
- Phylum: Chordata
- Class: Mammalia
- Order: Proboscidea
- Family: Elephantidae
- Genus: Loxodonta
- Species: L. africana

Binomial name
- Loxodonta africana (Blumenbach, 1797)

Subspecies
- See text
- Range of the African bush elephant Resident Possibly resident Possibly extinct Resident and reintroduced

Synonyms
- Elephas africanus

= African bush elephant =

African bush elephant Temporal range: Pleistocene–Recent

Species of mammal

A herd of African elephants eating in the wild in Malawi, 2018

The African bush elephant (Loxodonta africana), also known as the African savanna elephant, is a species of elephant native to sub-Saharan Africa. It is characterised by its long prehensile trunk with two finger-like processes, a concave back, large ears which help reduce body heat, and sturdy tusks that are noticeably curved. Its skin is grey with scanty hairs, and bending cracks which support thermoregulation by retaining water. It is the largest living terrestrial animal, with fully grown bulls reaching an average shoulder height of 3.04–3.36 m (10.0–11.0 ft) and a body mass of 5.2–6.9 t (5.7–7.6 short tons); the largest recorded specimen had a shoulder height of 3.96 m (13.0 ft) and an estimated body mass of 10.4 t (11.5 short tons).

The African bush elephant inhabits a variety of habitats such as forests, grasslands, woodlands, wetlands and agricultural land. It is a mixed herbivore feeding mostly on grasses, creepers, herbs, leaves, and bark. The average adult consumes about 150 kg (330 lb) of vegetation and 230 L (51 imp gal; 61 US gal) of water each day. It is a social animal that lives in herds of cows and their offspring. Adult bulls usually live alone or in small bachelor groups. During the mating season, males undergo musth, a period of high testosterone levels and heightened aggression. The menstrual cycle of cows lasts three to four months, and gestation around 22 months, the longest of any mammal.

Since 2021, the African bush elephant has been listed as Endangered on the IUCN Red List. It is threatened foremost by habitat destruction, and in parts of its range also by poaching for meat and ivory. Between 2003 and 2015, the illegal killing of 14,606 African bush elephants was reported by rangers across 29 range countries. Chad is a major transit country for smuggling of ivory in West Africa, though this trend was curtailed by raising penalties for poaching and improving law enforcement. Poaching of the elephant in the 1970–1980s were considered the largest killings in history. In human culture, elephants have been extensively featured in literature, folklore and media, and are most valued for their large tusks.

== Taxonomy and evolution ==
In the 19th and 20th centuries, several zoological specimens were described by naturalists and curators of natural history museums from various parts of Africa, including:

- Elephas (Loxodonta) oxyotis and Elephas (Loxodonta) knochenhaueri by Paul Matschie in 1900. The first was a specimen from the upper Atbara River in northern Ethiopia, and the second a specimen from the Kilwa area in Tanzania.
- Elephas africanus toxotis, selousi, peeli, cavendishi, orleansi and rothschildi by Richard Lydekker in 1907 who assumed that ear size is a distinguishing character for a race. These specimens were shot in South Africa, Mashonaland in Zimbabwe, Aberdare Mountains and Lake Turkana area in Kenya, Somaliland, and western Sudan, respectively.
- North African elephant (L. a. pharaohensis) by Paulus Edward Pieris Deraniyagala in 1948 was a specimen from Fayum in Egypt.

Today, these names are all considered synonyms.

A genetic study based on mitogenomic analysis revealed that the African and Asian elephant genetically diverged about 7.6 million years ago. Phylogenetic analysis of nuclear DNA from African bush and forest elephants, Asian elephants, the woolly mammoth, and the American mastodon revealed that the African bush elephant and the African forest elephant form a sister group that genetically diverged at least 1.9 million years ago. They are therefore considered distinct species. Gene flow between the two species, however, might have occurred after the split. Some authors have suggested that L. africana evolved from Loxodonta atlantica.

The fossil record for L. africana is sparse. The earliest possible records of the species are from the Shungura Formation around Omo in Ethiopia, which are dated to the Early Pleistocene, around 2.44–2.27 million years ago. Another possible early record is from the Kanjera site in Kenya, dating to the Middle Pleistocene, around 500,000 years ago. Genetic analysis suggests a major population expansion between 500,000 and 100,000 years ago. Records become more common during the Late Pleistocene, following the extinction of the last African Palaeoloxodon elephant species, Palaeoloxodon jolensis.

== Description ==
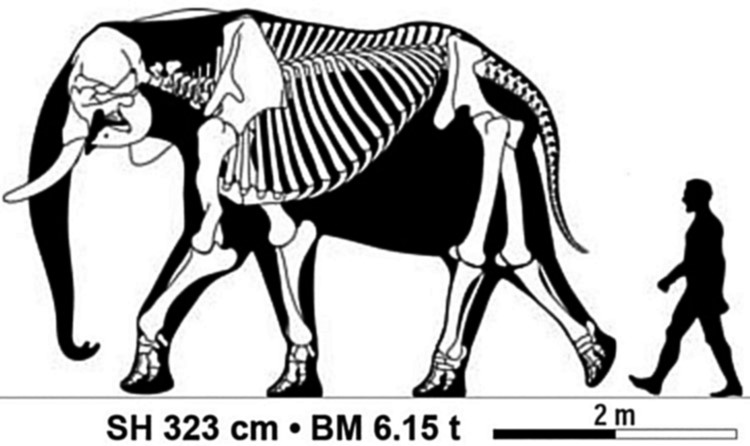
Skeletal diagram of an African bush elephant bull (Jumbo) in side-on view compared to a human

The African bush elephant has grey skin with scanty hairs. Its large ears cover the whole shoulder, and can grow as large as 2 m × 1.5 m (6 ft 7 in × 4 ft 11 in). Its large ears help to reduce body heat; flapping them creates air currents and exposes large blood vessels on the inner sides to increase heat loss during hot weather. The African bush elephant's ears are pointed and triangular shaped. Its occipital plane slopes forward. Its back is shaped markedly concave. Its sturdy tusks are curved out and point forward. Its long trunk or proboscis ends with two finger-like tips.

=== Size ===
Average size of adults with the largest recorded individual included

The African bush elephant is the largest and heaviest living land animal. Under optimal conditions where individuals are capable of reaching full growth potential, fully grown mature males are about 3.20 m (10.5 ft) tall at the shoulder and weigh 6.0 t (6.6 short tons) on average (with 90% of fully grown males under optimal conditions being between 3.04–3.36 m (10.0–11.0 ft) and 5.2–6.9 t (5.7–7.6 short tons)). Mature fully grown females are smaller at about 2.60 m (8 ft 6 in) tall at the shoulder and 3.0 t (3.3 short tons) in weight on average under optimal growth conditions (with 90% of fully grown females ranging between 2.47–2.73 m (8 ft 1 in – 8 ft 11 in) and 2.6–3.5 t (2.9–3.9 short tons) in optimal conditions). The largest well-measured bull, shot in Angola in 1974, is calculated to have been 3.96 m (13.0 ft) tall at the shoulder, with this individual having an estimated weight of 10.4 t (11.5 short tons). (Note: Another elephant shot in Angola in 1955, popularly called "Fénykövi" (after the man who shot it) or "Henry", on display at the Smithsonian, was measured to have a shoulder height of 4.01 m (13.2 ft) on its side, indicating a standing shoulder height of 3.81 m (12.5 ft), but measurements of its bones suggests its real shoulder height was only 3.5 metres (11.5 ft).) Elephants attain their maximum stature when they complete the fusion of long-bone epiphyses, occurring in males around the age of 40 and females around 25 years of age.

=== Dentition ===
The dental formula of the African bush elephant is 1.0.3.30.0.3.3 × 2 = 26. They develop six molars in each jaw quadrant that erupt at different ages and differ in size. The first molars grow to a size of 2 cm (0.79 in) wide by 4 cm (1.6 in) long, are worn by the age of one year and lost by the age of about 2.5 years. The second molars start protruding at the age of about six months, and grow to a size of 4 cm (1.6 in) wide by 7 cm (2.8 in) long and are lost by the age of 6–7 years. The third molars protrude at the age of about one year, grow to a size of 5.2 cm (2.0 in) wide by 14 cm (5.5 in) long, and are lost by the age of 8–10 years. The fourth molars show by the age of 6–7 years, grow to a size of 6.8 cm (2.7 in) wide by 17.5 cm (6.9 in) long and are lost by the age of 22–23 years. The dental alveoli of the fifth molars are visible by the age of 10–11 years. They grow to a size of 8.5 cm (3.3 in) wide by 22 cm (8.7 in) long and are worn by the age of 45–48 years. The dental alveoli of the last molars are visible by the age of 26–28 years. They grow to a size of 9.4 cm (3.7 in) wide by 31 cm (12 in) long and are well worn by the age of 65 years.

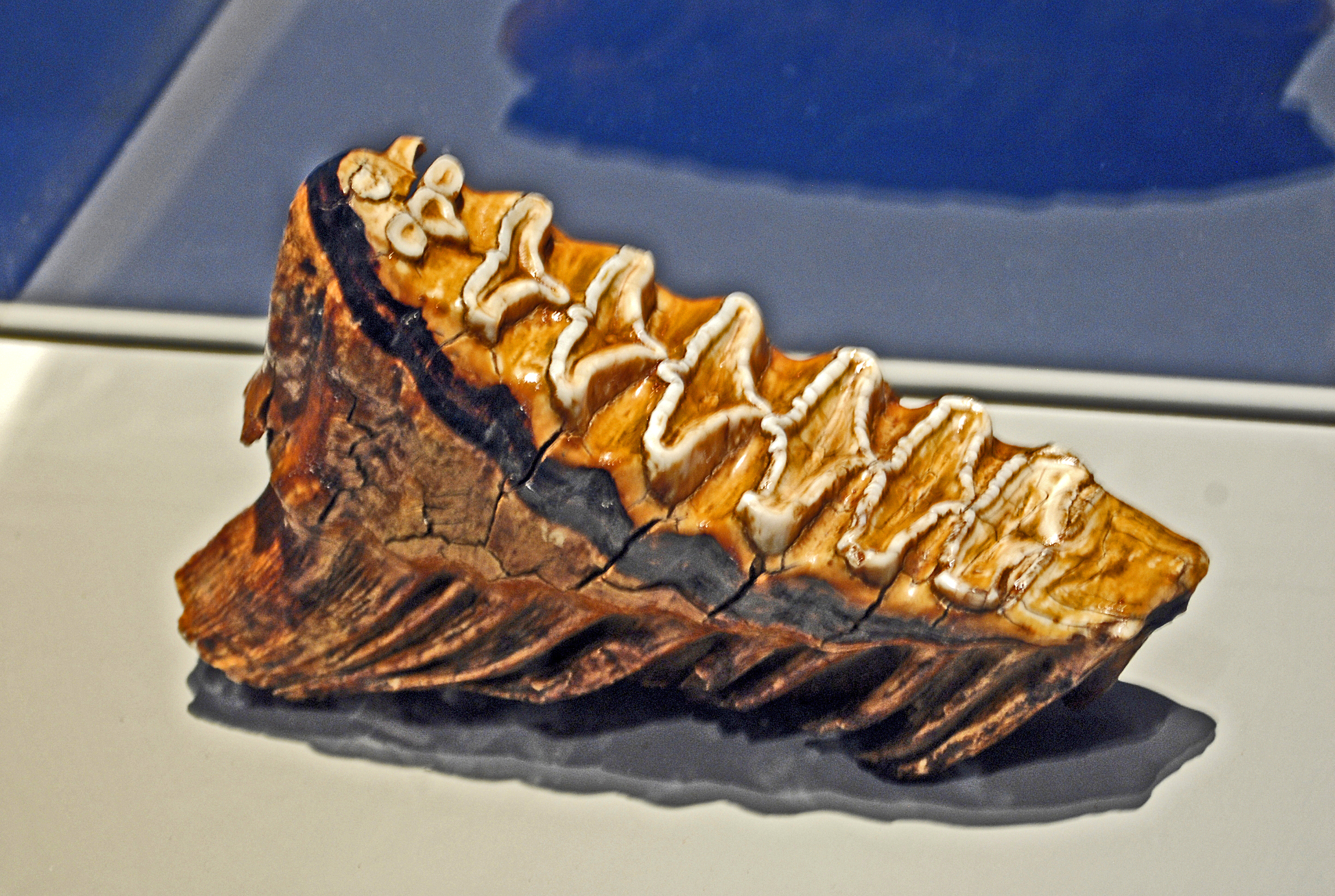
Molar of an adult African bush elephant

Both sexes have large, curved, maxillary incisors known as tusks that continue growing throughout their lives. In the wild, a large percentage of elephants experience a tusk fracture, although this is more prevalent in captivity. A tusk fracture of any sort usually results in serious infections, as the pulp is exposed to the elements. The tusks erupt when they are 1–3 years old. Tusks grow from deciduous teeth known as tushes that develop in the upper jaw and consist of a crown, root and pulpal cavity, which are completely formed soon after birth. Tushes reach a length of 5 cm (2.0 in). They are composed of dentin and coated with a thin layer of cementum. Their tips bear a conical layer of enamel that is usually worn off when the elephant is five years old. Tusks of bulls grow faster than tusks of cows. Mean weight of tusks at the age of 60 years is 109 kg (240 lb) in bulls and 17.7 kg (39 lb) in cows. The longest known tusk of an African bush elephant measured 3.51 m (11.5 ft) and weighed 117 kg (258 lb).

== Distribution and habitat ==
The African bush elephant occurs in sub-Saharan Africa which includes Uganda, Kenya, Tanzania, Botswana, Zimbabwe, Namibia, Zambia, Angola, Malawi, Mali, Rwanda, Mozambique and South Africa. It moves between a variety of habitats, including subtropical and temperate forests, dry and seasonally flooded grasslands, woodlands, wetlands, and agricultural land from sea level to mountain slopes. In Mali and Namibia, it also inhabits desert and semi-desert areas.

Populations of African bush elephants are increasing in some areas such as the Kruger National Park, where an annual growth of 4.2% was recorded between 2003 and 2015. There are estimated to be at least 17,000 elephants in the park's vicinity, as of 2015–the most of any area in South Africa. The increase in population occurred after the discontinuation of culling in the mid-1990s. This large elephant population is considered a problem to both the environment and its creatures. As such, with the use of natural processes, conservationists aim to control the ever-growing population. In other places in southern Africa, the elephant population continues to increase. Botswana in particular hosts more African bush elephants than any other country, at 130,000. In a 2019 study, populations were found to be steady, though the authors also noted an unusual increase in carcasses, possibly due to a new wave of poaching which was uncommon at the time.

In East Africa there are roughly 137,000 elephants distributed across six countries in a wide array of habitats, such as grasslands and woodlands. They are most threatened by illegal hunting activities, such as poaching. In one instance, between 2006 and 2013, the population in East Africa fell by 62% due to high poaching pressures. Tanzania (where 80% of the East African population reside) lost the most elephants, while the resident population in Somalia went locally extinct. South Sudan, on the other hand, experienced an increase in elephants. Following successful conservation and governmental actions, Kenya also saw an increase in their elephant numbers. In Ethiopia, the African bush elephant has historically been recorded up to an elevation of 2,500 m (8,200 ft). By the late 1970s, the population had declined to one herd in the Dawa River valley and one close to the Kenyan border. As of 2015, there are estimated to be 1,900–2,151 elephants in the country, a decrease from 6,000–10,000 in the 1970s. It is estimated that between the 1980s and 2010s, elephants in Ethiopia experienced a decline of around 90%–hence the endangered assessment.

In West and Central Africa, the population of elephants are threatened, in large part due to habitat loss and fragmentation associated with rapid growth in human populations. Elephants occur in isolated pockets throughout the region and are for the most part decreasing in number.

== Behaviour and ecology ==
=== Social behaviour ===
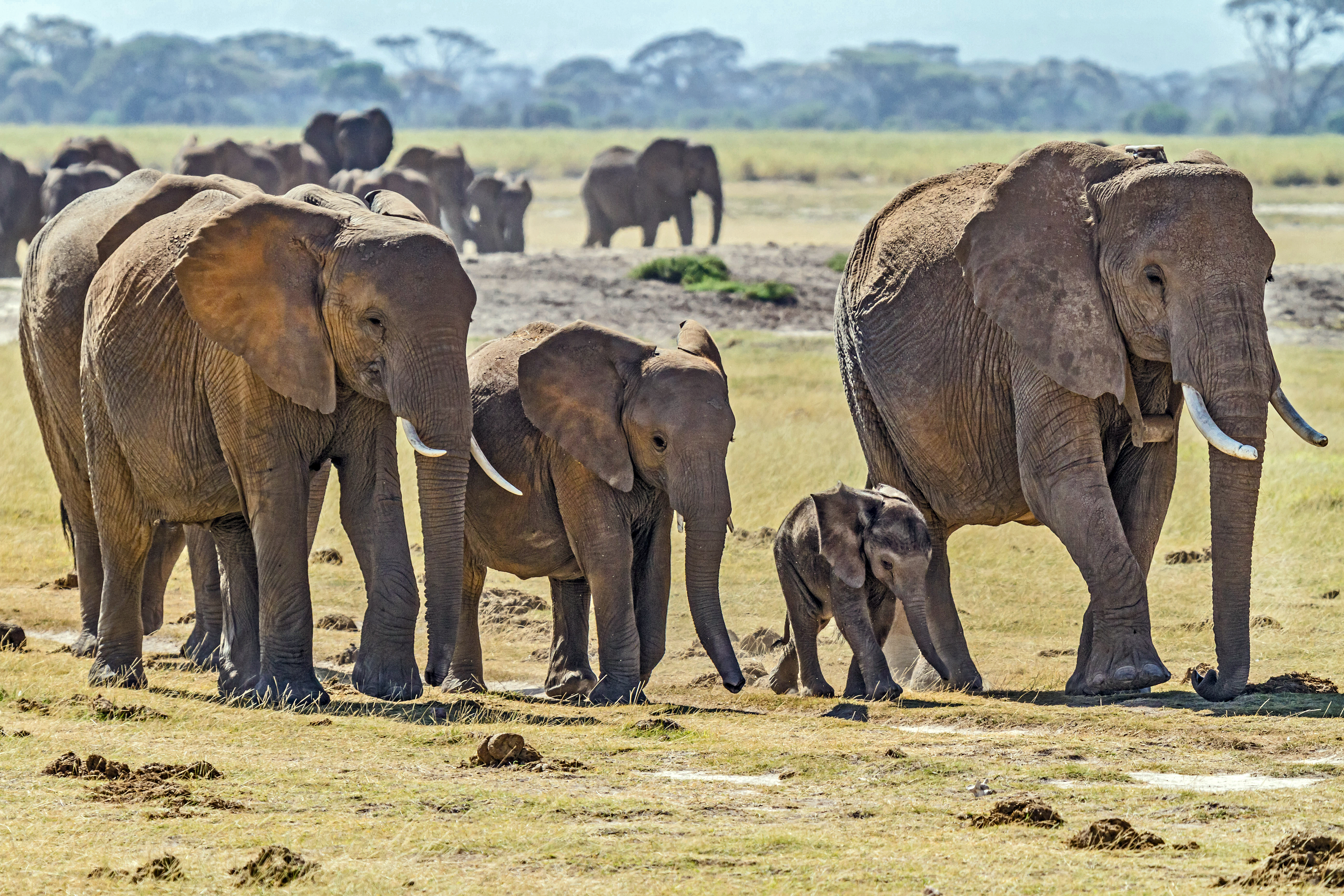
Elephant family in Amboseli National Park, Kenya

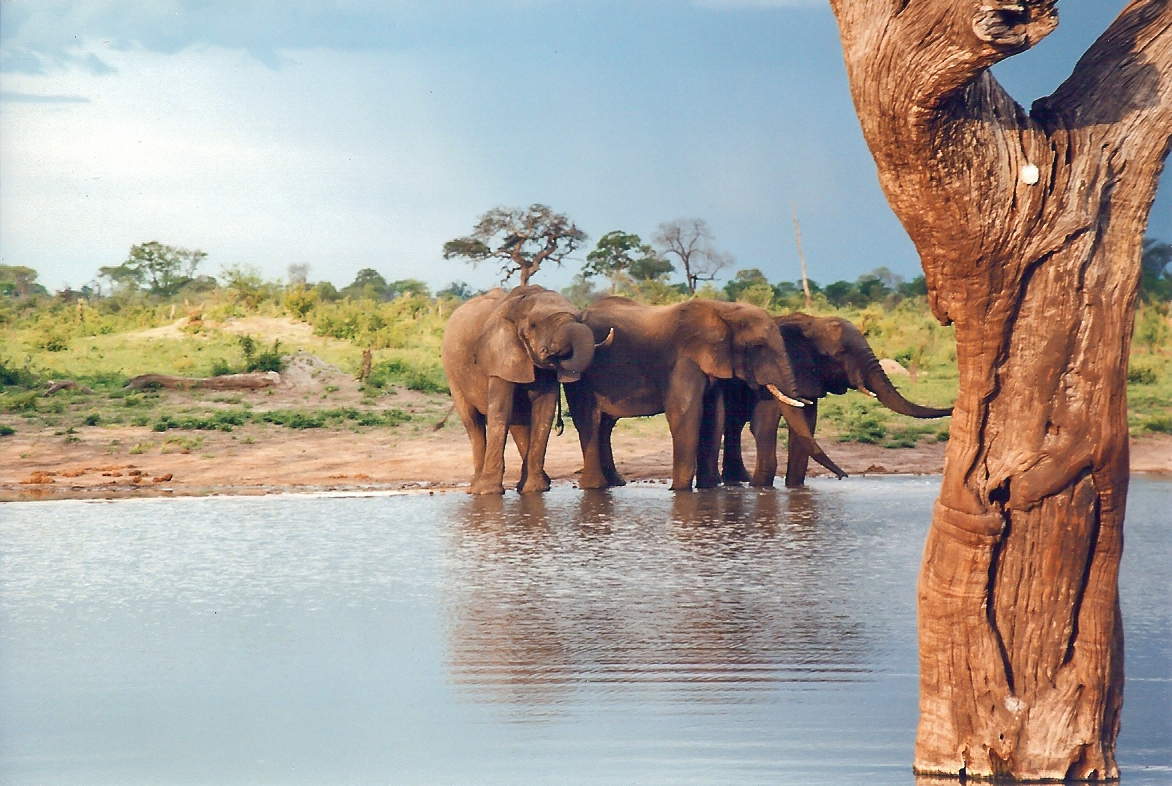
Young bulls in a bachelor group in Hwange National Park, Zimbabwe

The core of elephant society is the family unit, which mostly comprises several adult cows, their daughters, and their prepubertal sons. Iain Douglas-Hamilton, who observed African bush elephants for 4.5 years in Lake Manyara National Park, coined the term 'kinship group' for two or more family units that have close ties. The family unit is led by a matriarch who at times also leads the kinship group. Groups cooperate in locating food and water, in self-defense, and in caring for offspring (termed allomothering). Group size varies seasonally and between locations. In Tsavo East and Tsavo West National Parks, groups are bigger in the rainy season and areas with open vegetation. Aerial surveys in the late 1960s to early 1970s revealed an average group size of 6.3 individuals in Uganda's Rwenzori National Park and 28.8 individuals in Chambura Game Reserve. In both sites, elephants aggregated during the wet season, whereas groups were smaller in the dry season.

Young bulls gradually separate from the family unit when they are between 10 and 19 years old. They range alone for some time or form all-male groups. A 2020 study highlighted the importance of old bulls for the navigation and survival of herds and raised concerns over the removal of old bulls as "currently occur[ring] in both legal trophy hunting and illegal poaching".

=== Temperature regulation ===
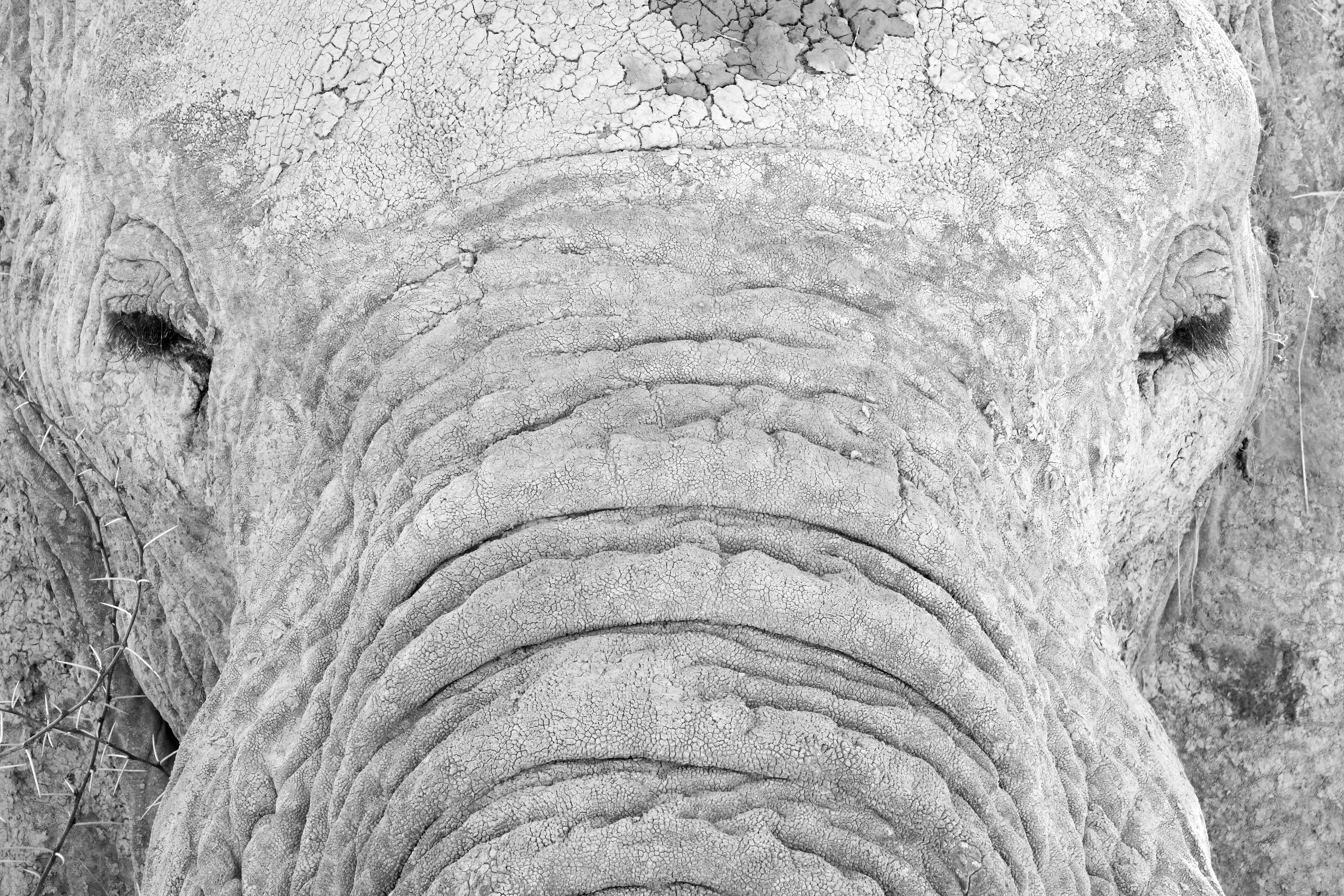
African bush elephant face close-up showcasing cracked dry mud and dust

The African bush elephant has curved skin with bending cracks, which support thermoregulation by retaining water. These bending cracks contribute to an evaporative cooling process which helps to maintain body temperature via homeothermy regardless of air temperature.

=== Diet ===
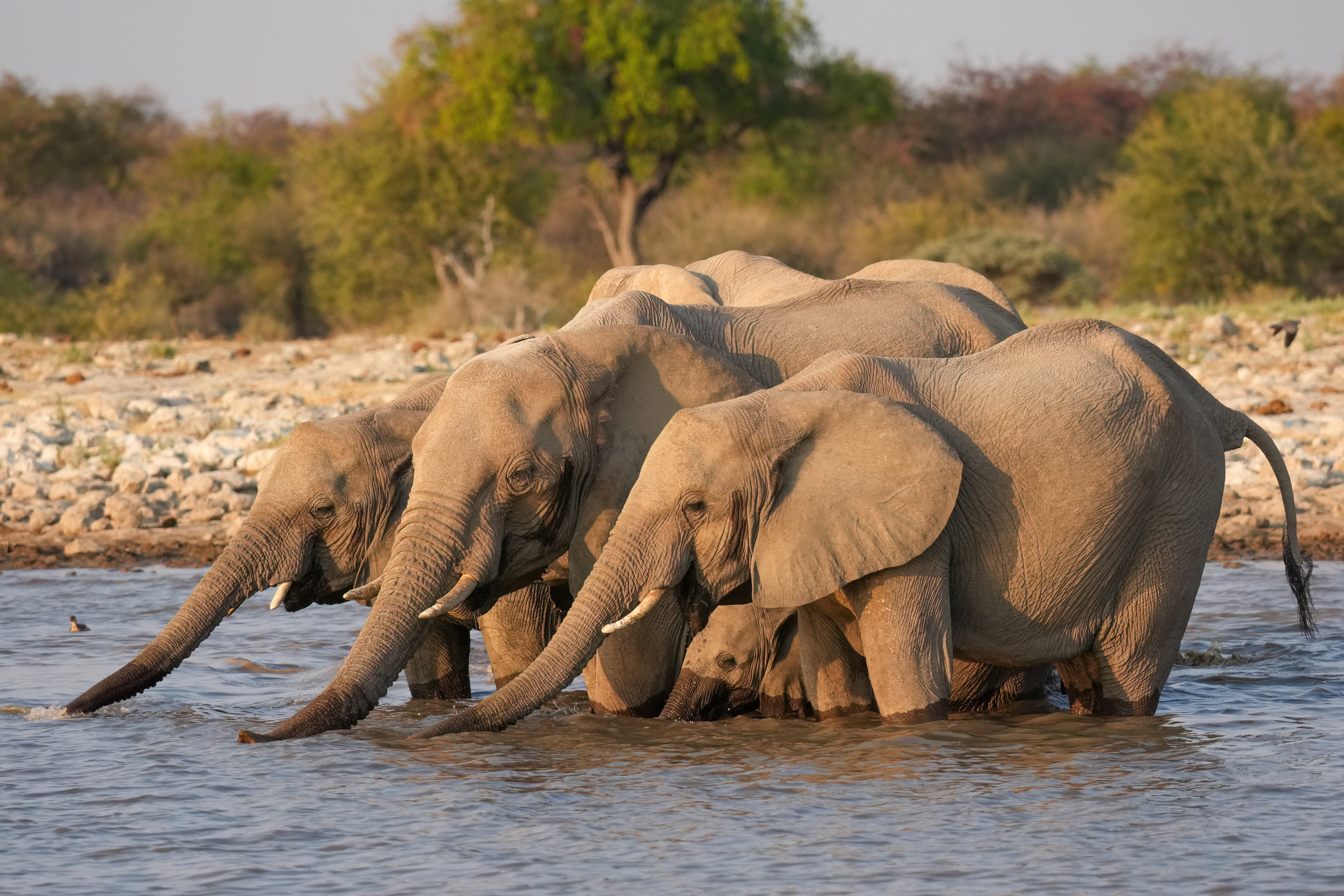
Herd of African bush elephants drinking in Etosha National Park, Namibia

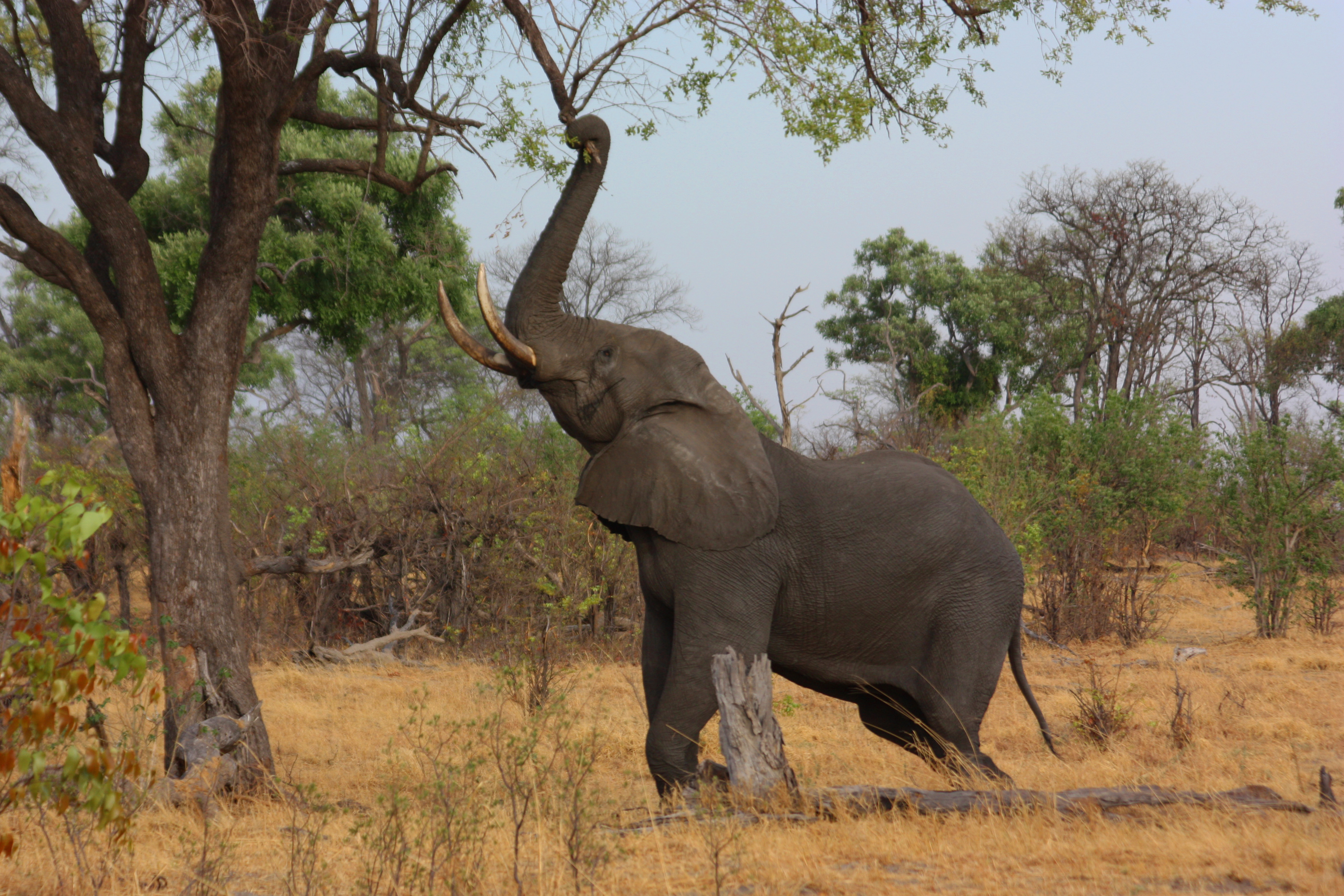
A bull elephant stretching up to break off a tree branch in the Okavango Delta, Botswana

The African bush elephant is herbivorous. It is a mixed feeder, consuming both grasses as well as woody vegetation (browse), with the proportions varying wildly depending on the habitat and time of year, ranging from almost exclusively grazing to near-total browsing. African bush elephants' consumption of woody plants, particularly their habit of uprooting trees, has the ability to alter the local environment, transforming woodlands into grasslands. African bush elephants also at times consume fruit and serve as seed dispersers. Adults can consume up to 150 kg (330 lb) of food per day. To supplement their diet with minerals, they congregate at mineral-rich water holes, termite mounds, and mineral licks. Salt licks visited by elephants in the Kalahari contain high concentrations of water-soluble sodium. Elephants drink 180–230 litres (50–60 US gal) of water daily, and seem to prefer sites where water and soil contain sodium. In Kruger National Park and on the shore of Lake Kariba, elephants were observed to ingest wood ash, which also contains sodium.

=== Communication ===
African bush elephants use their trunks for tactile communication. When greeting, a lower ranking individual will insert the tip of its trunk into its superior's mouth. Elephants will also stretch out their trunk toward an approaching individual they intend to greet. Mother elephants reassure their young with touches, embraces, and rubbings with the foot, while slapping disciplines them. During courtship, a couple will caress and intertwine with their trunks while playing, and fighting individuals wrestle with them.

Elephant vocalisations are variations of rumbles, trumpets, squeals, and screams. Rumbles are mainly produced for long-distance communication and cover a broad range of frequencies which are mostly below what a human can hear. Infrasonic rumbles can travel vast distances and are important for attracting mates and scaring off rivals.

Growls are audible rumbles and happen during greetings. When in pain or fear, an elephant makes an open-mouthed growl known as a bellow. A drawn-out growl is known as a moan. Growling can escalate into a roaring when the elephant is issuing a threat. Trumpeting is made by blowing through the trunk and signals excitement, distress, or aggression. Juvenile elephants squeal in distress while screaming is done by adults for intimidation.

=== Musth ===
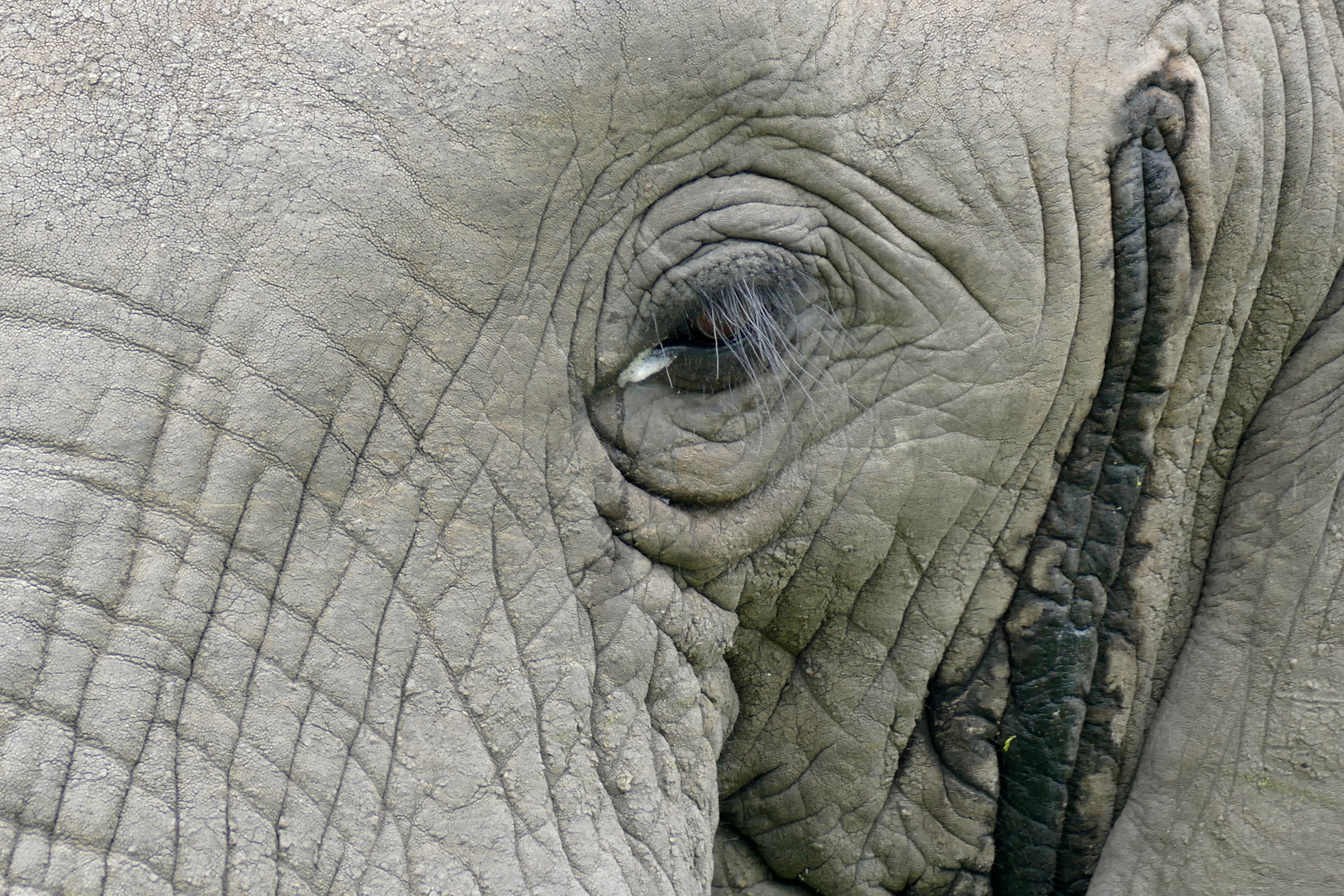
Bull in musth

Bulls in musth experience swelling of the temporal glands and secretion of fluid, the musth fluid, which flows down their cheeks. They begin to dribble urine, initially as discrete drops and later in a regular stream. These manifestations of musth last from a few days to months, depending on the age and condition of the bull. When a bull has been urinating for a long time, the proximal part of the penis and the distal end of the sheath show a greenish colour, termed the 'green penis syndrome' by Joyce Poole and Cynthia Moss. Males in musth become more aggressive. They guard and mate with females in estrus, who stay closer to bulls in musth than to non-musth bulls. Urinary testosterone increases during musth. Bulls begin to experience musth by the age of 24 years. Periods of musth are short and sporadic in young bulls up to 35 years old, lasting a few days to weeks. Older bulls are in musth for 2–5 months every year. Musth occurs mainly during and following the rainy season when females are in oestrus. Bulls in musth often chase each other and are aggressive towards other bulls in musth. When old and high-ranking bulls in musth threaten and chase young musth bulls, either the latter leave the group or their musth ceases.

Young bulls in musth killed (and raping some) 63 mostly endangered or rare rhinoceros (of both sexes) in Hluhluwe-Umfolozi Park and Pilanesberg National Park in South Africa during the 1990s. This behaviour was attributed to their young age and inadequate socialisation; they were 17–25-year-old orphans from culled families who were spared due to their size and age but grew up without the guidance of either a breeding herd or dominant bulls. They entered musth prematurely and were rejected by older female elephants, thus leading to the assaults. Ecologist and gamekeeper Gus Van Dyk thought of a solution after the temporary solution of shooting three young bulls suspected of massacring the rhinos. When six adult bulls were introduced into Pilanesberg and ten bulls were introduced into Hluhluwe-Umfolozi—each up to 45 years old—the killings stopped. Older male elephants suppress the musth and can also control the aggressiveness of younger bulls.

=== Reproduction ===
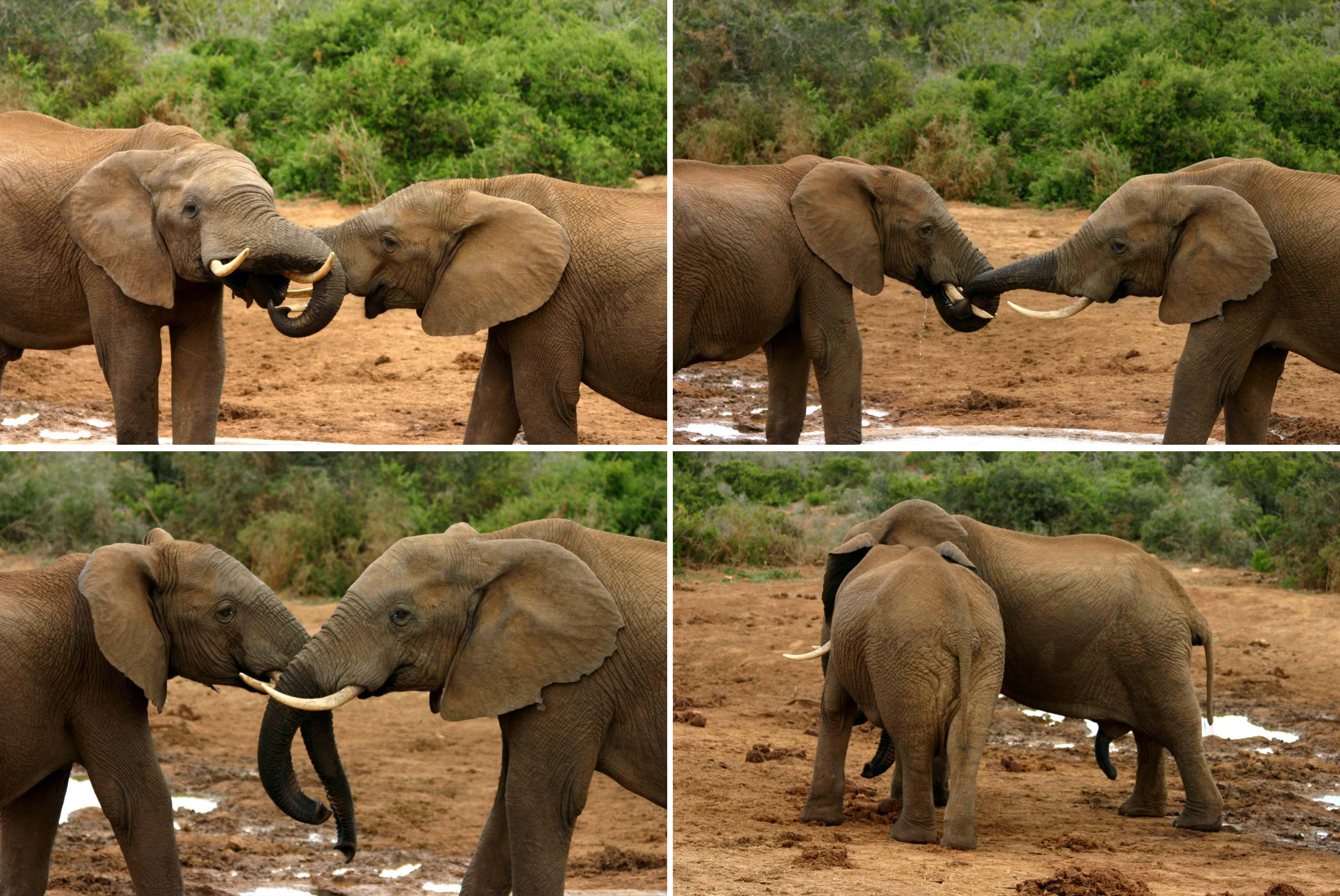
Mating ritual in Addo Elephant Park

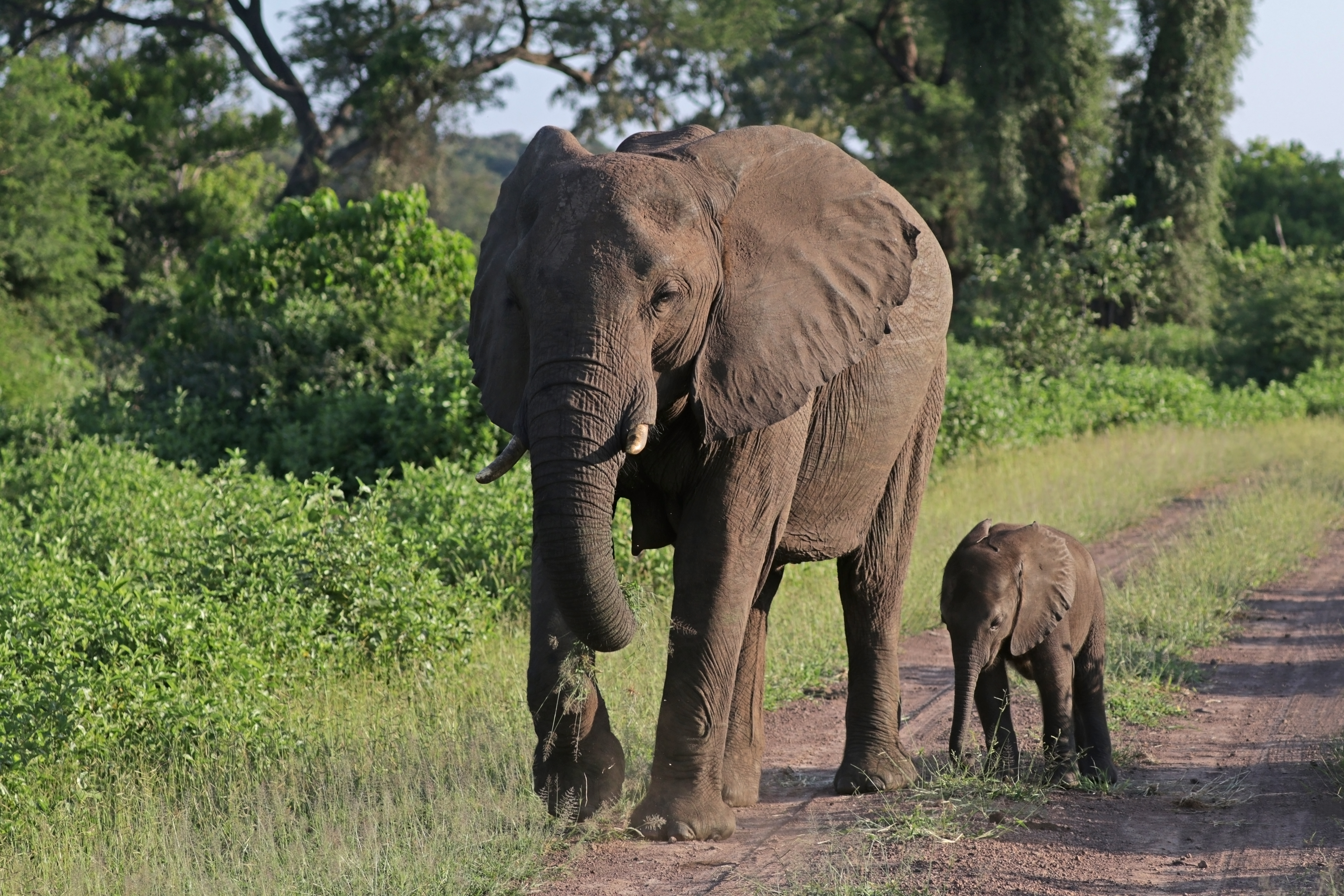
Cow with six-week-old calf in Zimbabwe

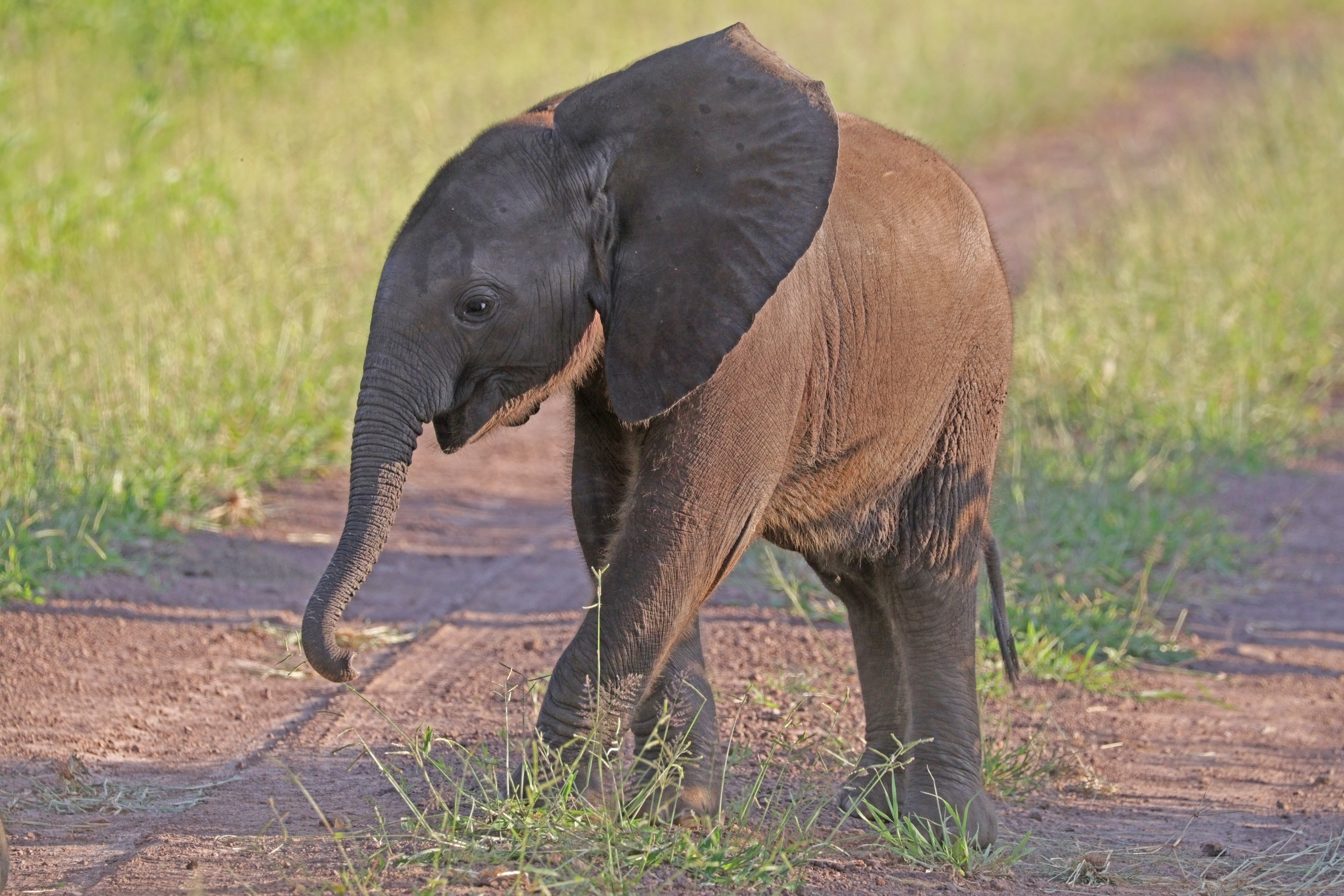
Calf of six weeks in Zimbabwe

Spermatogenesis starts when bulls are about 15 years old. However, males have not begun sexual cycles, not experiencing their first musth period until they are 25 or 30 years of age. Cows ovulate for the first time at the age of 11 years. They are in estrus for 2–6 days. In captivity, cows have an oestrous cycle lasting 14–15 weeks. Foetal gonads enlarge during the second half of pregnancy.

African bush elephants mate during the rainy season. Bulls in musth cover long distances in search of cows and associate with large family units. They listen for the cows' loud, very low frequency calls and attract cows by calling and by leaving trails of strong-smelling urine. Cows search for bulls in musth, listen for their calls, and follow their urine trails. Bulls in musth are more successful at obtaining mating opportunities than those who are not. A cow may move away from bulls that attempt to test her estrous condition. If pursued by several bulls, she will run away. Once she chooses a mating partner, she will stay away from other bulls, which are threatened and chased away by the favoured bull. Competition between bulls sometimes overrides the cow's choice of mating partner. After the mating period, females will undergo a gestation of 22 months. The interval between births was estimated at 3.9 to 4.7 years in Hwange National Park. Where hunting pressure on adult elephants was high in the 1970s, cows gave birth once in 2.9 to 3.8 years. Cows in Amboseli National Park gave birth once in 5 years on average.

The birth of a calf was observed in Tsavo East National Park in October 1990. A group of 80 elephants including eight bulls had gathered in the morning in a 150 m (490 ft) radius around the birth site. A small group of calves and cows stood near the pregnant cow, rumbling and flapping their ears. One cow seemed to assist her. While she was in labour, fluid streamed from her temporal and ear canals. She remained standing while giving birth. The newborn calf struggled to its feet within 30 minutes and walked 20 minutes later. The mother expelled the placenta about 100 minutes after birth and covered it with soil immediately.

Captive-born calves weigh between 100 and 120 kg (220 and 260 lb) at birth and gain about 0.5 kg (1.1 lb) weight per day. Cows lactate for about 4.8 years. Calves exclusively suckle their mother's milk during the first three months. Thereafter, they start feeding independently and slowly increase the time spent feeding until they are two years old. During the first three years, male calves spend more time suckling and grow faster than female calves. After this period, cows reject male calves more frequently from nursing than female calves.

The maximum lifespan of the African bush elephant is between 70 and 75 years. Its generation length is 25 years.

=== Predators ===
Adult elephants are considered invulnerable to predation. Adult elephants often chase off predators, especially lions, by mobbing behaviour. Calves, usually under two years, are sometimes preyed on by lions, African wild dogs, Nile crocodiles, and spotted hyenas. Juveniles are usually well defended by protective adults though serious drought makes them vulnerable to lion predation.

In Botswana's Chobe National Park, lions attacked and fed on juvenile and subadult elephants during the drought when smaller prey species were scarce. Between 1993 and 1996, lions successfully attacked 74 elephants; 26 were older than nine, and one was a bull of over 15 years. Most were killed at night, and hunts occurred more often during waning moon nights than during bright moon nights. In the same park, lions killed eight elephants in October 2005 that were aged between 1 and 11 years, two of them older than 8 years. Successful hunts took place after dark when prides exceeded 27 lions and herds were smaller than 5 elephants.

=== Pathogens ===
Observations at Etosha National Park indicate that African bush elephants die due to anthrax foremost in November at the end of the dry season. Anthrax spores spread through the intestinal tracts of vultures, jackals and hyaenas that feed on the carcasses. Anthrax killed over 100 elephants in Botswana in 2019. It is thought that wild bush elephants can contract fatal tuberculosis from humans. Infection of the vital organs by Citrobacter freundii bacteria caused the death of an otherwise healthy bush elephant after capture and translocation.

From April to June 2020, over 400 bush elephants died in Botswana's Okavango Delta region after drinking from desiccating waterholes that were infested with cyanobacteria. Neurotoxins produced by the cyanobacteria caused calves and adult elephants to wander around confused, emaciated and in distress. The elephants collapsed when the toxin impaired their motor functions and their legs became paralysed. Poaching, intentional poisoning, and anthrax were excluded as potential causes.

Elephants may also be host for a variety of parasites and bacteria such as Pasteurella, Salmonella, Clostridium, coccidian, nematode, and trematode. The elephant endotheliotropic herpesvirus (EEHV) is a member of the Proboscivirus genus, a novel clade most closely related to the mammalian betaherpesviruses. In benign infections found in some wild and captive African elephants, these viruses can affect either the skin or the pulmonary system.

=== Intelligence ===
Both African and Asian elephants have a very large and highly complex neocortex, a trait also shared by humans, apes and certain dolphin species. Elephants manifest a wide variety of behaviour, including those associated with grief, learning, mimicry, playing, altruism, tool use, compassion, cooperation, self-awareness, memory, and communication. In a 2013 study, it was suggested that elephants may understand pointing, the ability to nonverbally communicate an object by extending a finger, or equivalent. The intelligence of elephants is described as being on a par with that of cetaceans, and various primates.

== Threats ==
The African bush elephant is threatened primarily by habitat loss and fragmentation following conversion of natural habitat for livestock farming, plantations of non-timber crops, and building of urban and industrial areas. As a result, human-elephant conflict has increased.

=== Poaching ===
Poachers target foremost elephant bulls for their tusks, which leads to a skewed sex ratio and affects the survival chances of a population. Access of poachers to unregulated black markets is facilitated by corruption and periods of civil war in some elephant range countries. During the 20th century, the African bush elephant population was decimated. Poaching of the elephant has dated back to the years 1970 and 1980, which were considered the largest killings in history. The species is placed in harm's way due to the limited conservation areas provided in Africa. In most cases, the killings of the African bush elephant have occurred near the outskirts of the protected areas.

Between 2003 and 2015, the illegal killing of 14,606 African bush elephants was reported by rangers across 29 range countries. Chad is a major transit country for smuggling of ivory in West Africa. This trend was curtailed by raising penalties for poaching and improving law enforcement. Before this in June 2002, a container packed with more than 6.5 t (6.4 long tons; 7.2 short tons) ivory was confiscated in Singapore. It contained 42,120 hanko stamps and 532 tusks of African bush elephants that originated in Southern Africa, centred in Zambia and neighboring countries. Between 2005 and 2006, a total of 23.461 t (23.090 long tons; 25.861 short tons) ivory plus 91 unweighed tusks of African bush elephants were confiscated in 12 major consignments being shipped to Asia.

When the international ivory trade reopened in 2006, the demand and price for ivory increased in Asia. The African bush elephant population in Chad's Zakouma National Park numbered 3,900 individuals in 2005. Within five years, more than 3,200 elephants were killed. The park did not have sufficient guards to combat poaching, and their weapons were outdated. Well-organised networks facilitated smuggling the ivory through Sudan. Poaching also increased in Kenya in those years. In Samburu National Reserve, 41 bulls were illegally killed between 2008 and 2012, equivalent to 31% of the reserve's elephant population. These killings were linked to confiscations of ivory and increased prices for ivory on the local black market. About 10,370 tusks were confiscated in Singapore, Hong Kong, Taiwan, Philippines, Thailand, Malaysia, Kenya and Uganda between 2007 and 2013. Genetic analysis of tusk samples showed that they originated from African bush elephants killed in Tanzania, Mozambique, Zambia, Kenya, and Uganda. Most of the ivory was smuggled through East African countries.

In addition to elephants being poached, their carcasses may be poisoned by the poachers to avoid detection by vultures, which help rangers detect poaching activity by circling dead animals. This poses a threat to those vultures or birds that scavenge the carcasses. On 20 June 2019, the carcasses of two tawny eagles and 537 endangered Old World vultures including 468 white-backed vultures, 17 white-headed vultures, 28 hooded vultures, 14 lappet-faced vultures and 10 Cape vultures found dead in northern Botswana were suspected to have died after eating the poisoned carcasses of three elephants.

Intensive poaching leads to strong selection on tusk attributes; African elephants in areas with heavy poaching often have smaller tusks and a higher frequency of congenitally tuskless females, whereas congenital tusklessness is rarely if ever observed in males. A study in Mozambique's Gorongosa National Park revealed that poaching during the Mozambican Civil War led to the increasing birth of tuskless females when the population recovered.

=== Habitat changes ===
Vast areas in Sub-Saharan Africa were transformed for agricultural use and the building of infrastructure. This disturbance leaves the elephants without a stable habitat and limits their ability to roam freely. Large corporations associated with commercial logging and mining have fragmented the land, giving poachers easy access to the African bush elephants. As human development grows, the human population faces the trouble of contact with the elephants more frequently, due to the species need for food and water. Farmers residing in nearby areas come into conflict with the African bush elephants rummaging through their crops. In many cases, they kill the elephants as soon as they disturb a village or forage upon its crops. Deaths caused by browsing on rubber vine, an invasive plant, have also been reported.

== Conservation ==
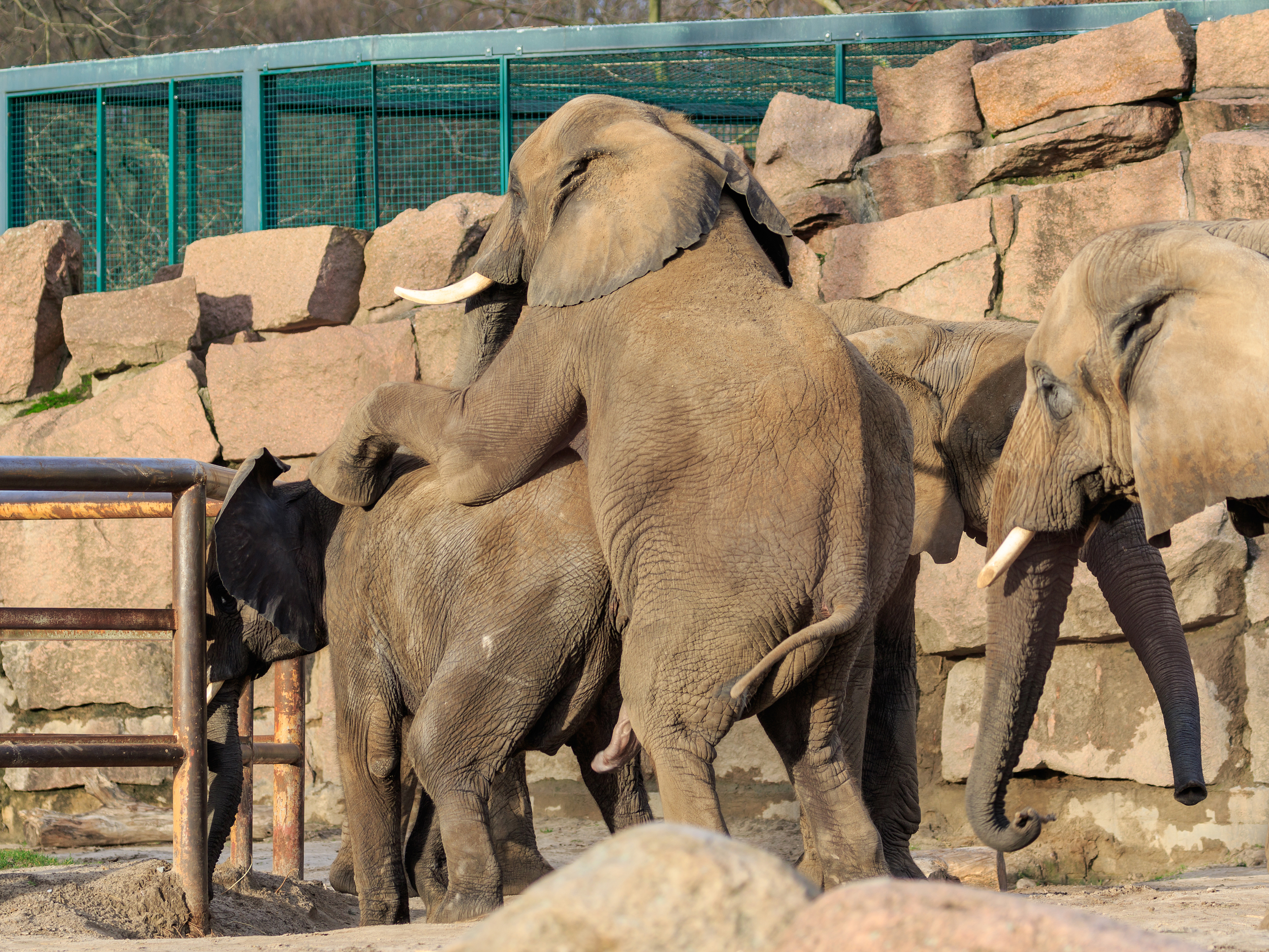
African bush elephants mating in Tierpark Berlin

Both African elephant species have been listed on Appendix I of the Convention on International Trade in Endangered Species of Wild Fauna and Flora since 1989. In 1997, populations of Botswana, Namibia, and Zimbabwe were placed on CITES Appendix II, as were populations of South Africa in 2000. Community-based conservation programmes have been initiated in several range countries, which contributed to reducing human-elephant conflict and increasing local people's tolerance towards elephants. Researchers discovered that playing back the recorded sounds of African bees is an effective method to drive elephants away from settlements.

In 1986, the African Elephant Database was initiated to collate and update information on the distribution and status of elephant populations in Africa. The database includes results from aerial surveys, dung counts, interviews with local people, and data on poaching.

=== Status ===
In 2008, the IUCN Red List assessed the African elephant (then considered as a single species) as vulnerable. Since 2021, the African bush elephant has individually been assessed Endangered, after the global population was found to have decreased by more than 50% over 3 generations. More than 50% of its range is located outside protected areas. In 2016, the global population was estimated at 415,428 ± 20,111 individuals distributed in a total area of 20,731,202 km^{2} (8,004,362 sq mi), of which 30% is protected. Approximately 42% of the total population lives in nine southern African countries comprising 293,447 ± 16,682 individuals; Africa's largest population lives in Botswana with 131,626 ± 12,508 individuals.

=== In captivity ===
The social behaviour of elephants in captivity mimics that of those in the wild. Cows are kept with other cows, in groups, while bulls tend to be separated from their mothers at a young age and are kept apart. According to Schulte, in the 1990s, in North America, a few facilities allowed bull interaction. Elsewhere, bulls were only allowed to smell each other. Bulls and cows were allowed to interact for specific purposes such as breeding. In that event, cows were more often moved to the bull than the bull to the cow. Cows are more often kept in captivity because they are easier and less expensive to house.

== Cultural significance ==
In Africa, elephants have found a prominent role in human culture since ancient times and were most priced for their ivory tusks, which were considered valuable commercial goods. In Kenya, the Maasai people have been known to use elephants for their tusks and often regard them as akin to humans. They feature extensively in Maasai culture, going by the local name of Arkanjowe (a being that is large and/or powerful). According to a Maasai legend, the elephant came to be when a woman, who was on her way to her partner's place for marriage, turned her back before reaching the destination. This event caused the woman to shape-shift into an elephant.

Prehistoric North Africans depicted the elephant in Paleolithic age rock art. For example, the Libyan Tadrart Acacus, a UNESCO World Heritage Site, features a rock carving of an elephant from the last phase of the Pleistocene epoch (12,000–8000 BCE) rendered with remarkable realism. There are many other prehistoric examples, including Neolithic rock art of south Oran (Algeria), and a white elephant rock painting in 'Phillip's Cave' by the San in the Erongo region of Namibia. From the Bovidian period (Note: During the African pastoral 'Bovidian period', there were many depictions of Bovid herds, suggesting the development of animal domestication. During this period humans began to domesticate animals, and transition to a seminomadic lifestyle as farmers and herders.) (3550–3070 BCE), elephant images by the San bushmen in the South African Cederberg Wilderness Area suggest to researchers that they had "a symbolic association with elephants" and "had a deep understanding of the communication, behaviour and social structure of elephant family units" and "possibly developed a symbiotic relationship with elephants that goes back thousands of years."

== See also ==
- 2006 Zakouma elephant slaughter
- Dwarf elephant
- Elephant cognition
- Knysna elephants
- Largest organisms
- List of individual elephants
- Pygmy elephant
