= Musth =

Condition in male elephants

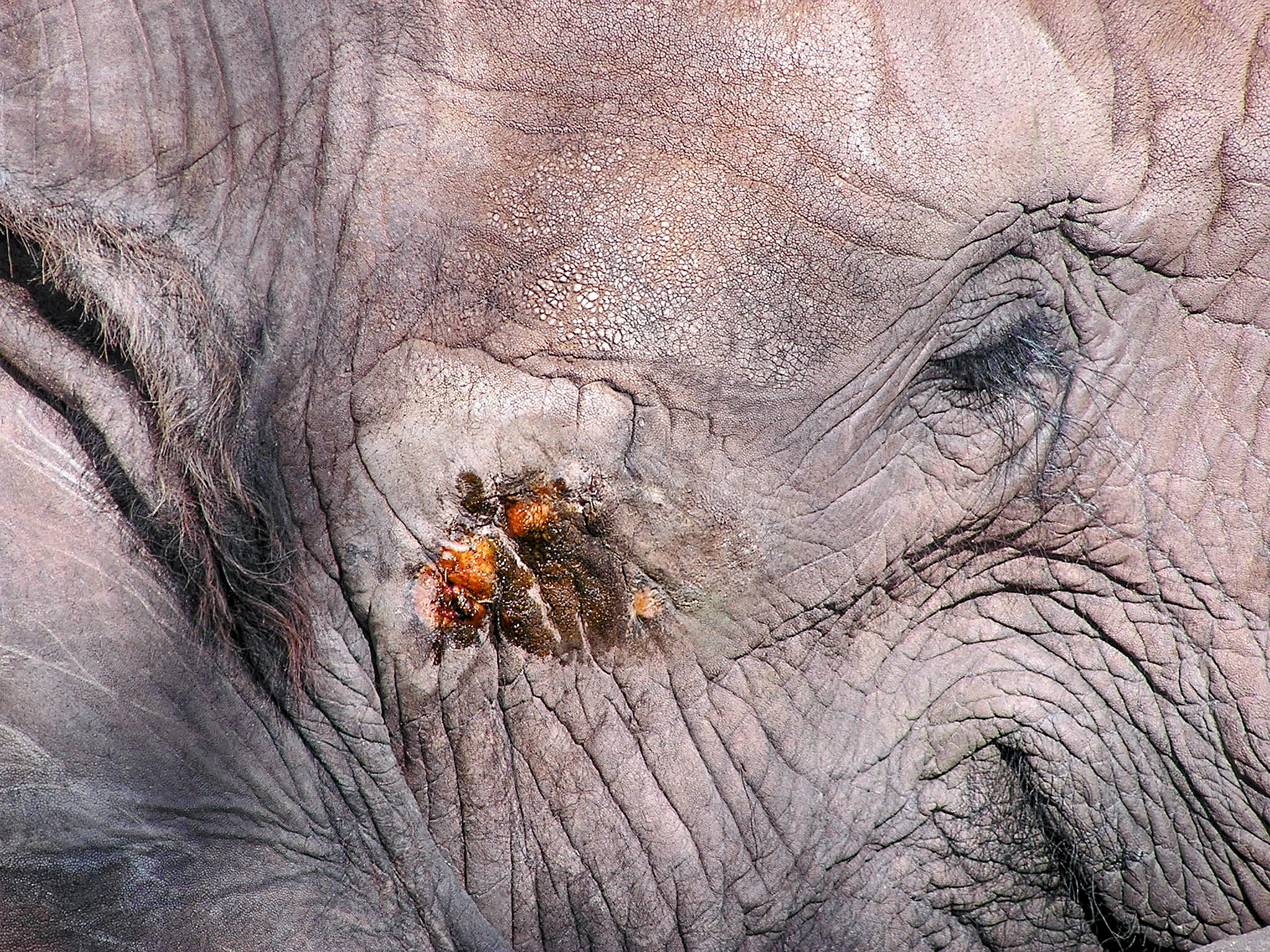
Temporin secretion during musth

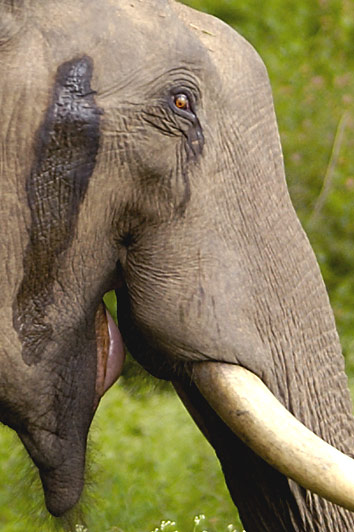
A wild Indian elephant in musth

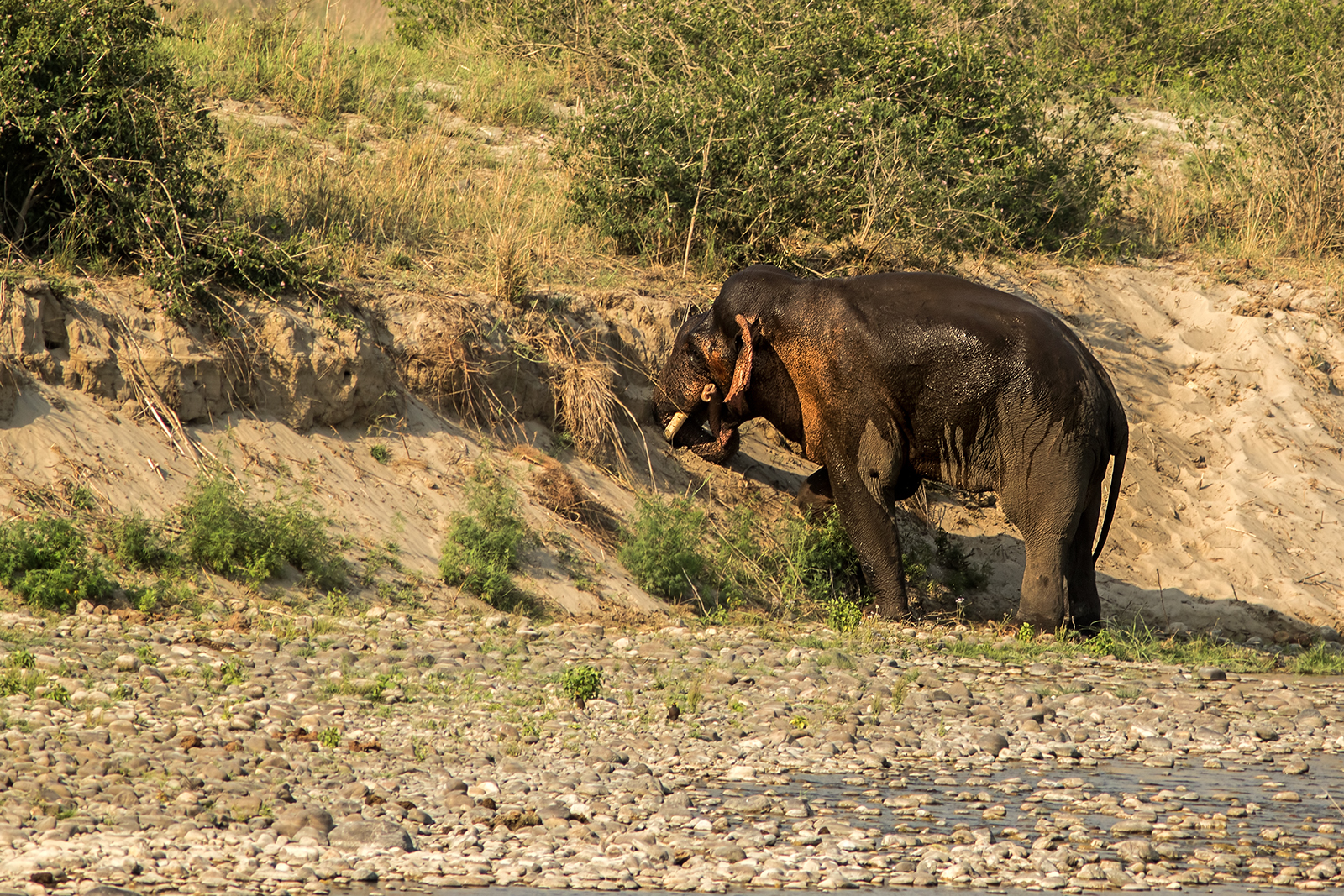
An elephant in musth digging his tusks into the ground

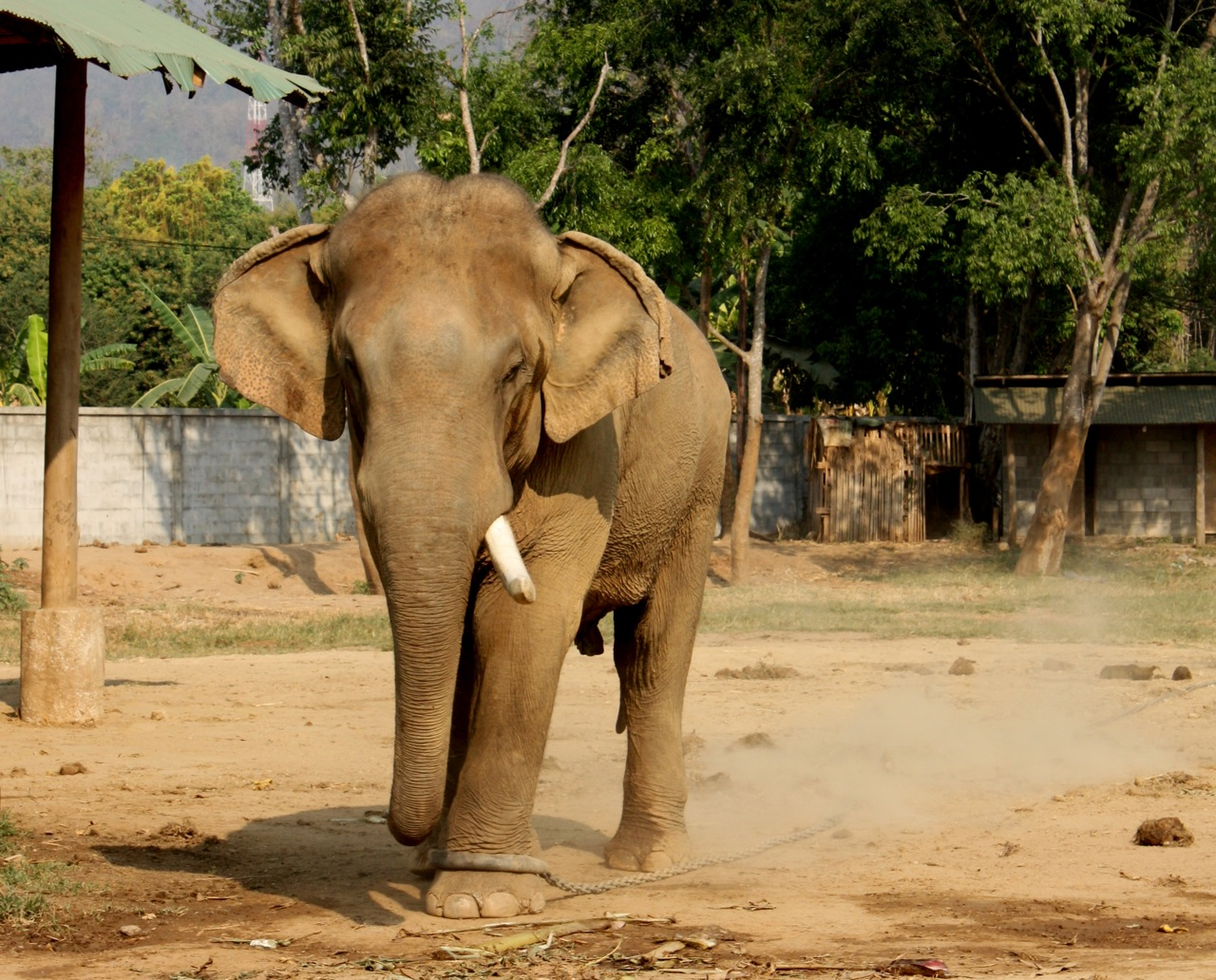
An Asian elephant bull chained during musth, with discharge from the temporal glands.

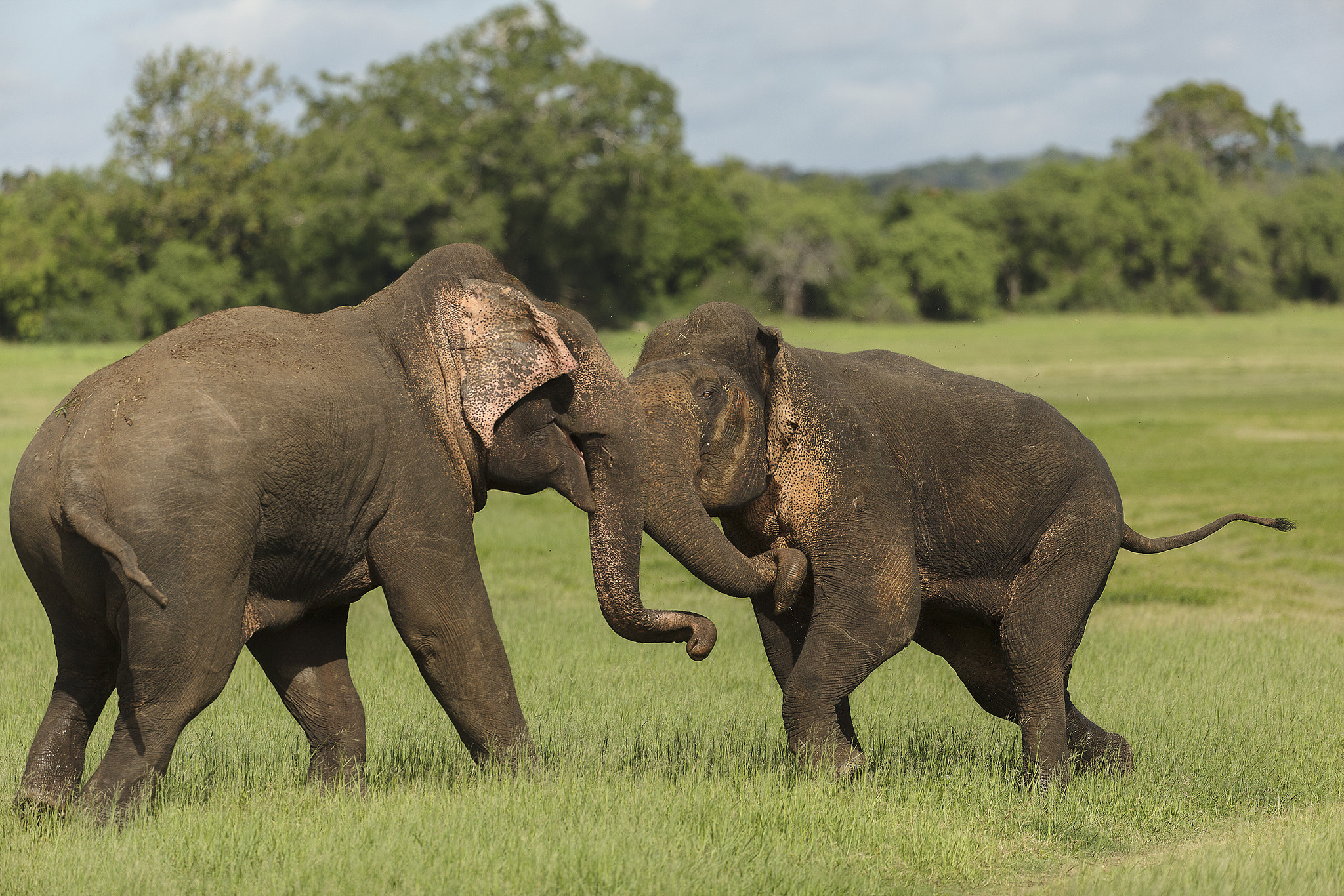
Elephants in musth fighting each other

Musth or must is a periodic condition in bull (male) elephants characterized by aggressive behavior and accompanied by a large rise in reproductive hormones. It has been known in Asian elephants for 3,000 years, but was only described in African elephants in 1981. Evidence indicates that similar behaviour occurred in extinct proboscideans like gomphotheres and mastodons.

Elephants often discharge a thick, tar-like secretion called temporin from the temporal gland during musth. Behavioral management for captive bull elephants in musth includes physical restraint and a starvation diet for several days to a week.

== Etymology ==
Musth comes from an Urdu term for intoxication; in Persian it means lit. 'intoxicated'.

== Biology ==
Musth has been known in Asian elephants for 3000 years, described in the Rigveda, but was recognized in African elephants only in the late twentieth century.

In 1975, scientists Joyce Poole and Cynthia Moss were working in Amboseli National Park, Kenya. Poole noticed a period of heightened reproductive activity and aggression in male African elephants. She began documenting and describing the physical and behavioral characteristics and temporal (time-related) dynamics among individual males. This led to scientifically identifying musth in African elephants.

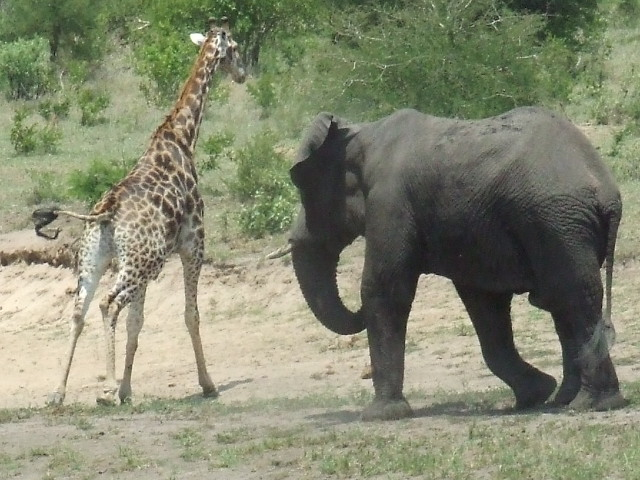
An African elephant chases a giraffe during musth.

Musth is also suggested to have occurred in mammoths, given the testosterone histories from their tusks. Musth-like behaviour is also suggested to have occurred in South American gomphotheres and North American mastodons.

Musth differs from rut in that musth most often takes place in winter, whereas the female elephant's estrous cycle is not seasonally linked.

== Physical characteristics ==
Elephants in musth often discharge a thick tar-like secretion called temporin from the temporal gland located on the temporal sides of the head. Temporin contains proteins, lipids (including cholesterol), phenol and 4-methyl phenol, cresols and sesquiterpenes (notably farnesol and its derivatives). Secretions and urine collected from zoo elephants have been shown to contain elevated levels of various highly odorous ketones and aldehydes.

Testosterone levels in an elephant in musth average 60 times greater than in the same elephant at other times, and in some individuals can increase by as much as 140 times.

== Behavioral characteristics ==
Musth is believed to be linked to sexual arousal or establishing dominance. Wild bulls in musth often produce a characteristic low, pulsating rumbling noise known as "musth rumble" that other elephants can hear from miles away. The rumble has been shown to prompt not only attraction in the form of reply vocalizations from cows in heat, but also silent avoidance behavior from other bulls, particularly juveniles and non-receptive females, suggesting an evolutionary benefit to advertising the musth state.

Bull elephants in musth, especially but not only in the wild, are extremely dangerous and have killed keepers/mahouts, livestock, other species, and other bull elephants, female elephants, and calves — the last usually inadvertently or accidentally in what is often called "herd infighting".

During the 1990s, young bull rogue elephants killed 63 rhinos of both sexes (58 endangered white rhinos and 5 rare black rhinos) in two South African national parks (Hluhluwe–Imfolozi and Pilanesberg). This was ultimately attributed to an aberrant form of musth. After being rebuffed by older female elephants, the young bulls went after rhinos, killing them. Three young elephant bulls were shot, temporarily ending the killings. Some scientists opined that this was an example of young male elephants permanently changed by the trauma of witnessing their breeding herds culled due to overcrowding in other South African parks. These young bulls had been spared due to their age and size, although herd culls are properly done in entirety, i.e., leaving no survivors to suffer the equivalents of PTSD, survivor guilt, and other disorders or traumas later in life, which could then create or exacerbate human-elephant conflicts or other forms of violence, according to Ron Thomson, a late 20th-century Zimbabwe game warden and Parks Board veteran. South African ecologist and ranger Gus van Dyk, who thought of the idea of reintroducing older males into Pilanesberg to prevent younger males from entering musth, noted that no further rhinoceros killings were observed.

In the absence of older males, whose presence inhibits musth in smaller younger bulls, these adolescent bulls had reached puberty (musth) prematurely, which reduced their control and resulted in the "warped behavior of animals who have lost their elders, and who are now flailing in a diminished, disarranged world." It is established that functionally important decision-making abilities may be significantly altered by disruption of the natural structure of kin-based social relationships and that violent disruption "appears capable of driving aberrant behaviours in social animals that are akin to the post-traumatic stress disorder experienced by humans following extremely traumatic events" due to the pachyderms' intelligence, strong emotional family attachments, and prodigious memories. Another interrelated but more generalized theory of why the young elephants went wild was that, owing to culls and herd fragmentation, there were no older elephants to teach and discipline them.

=== Management ===
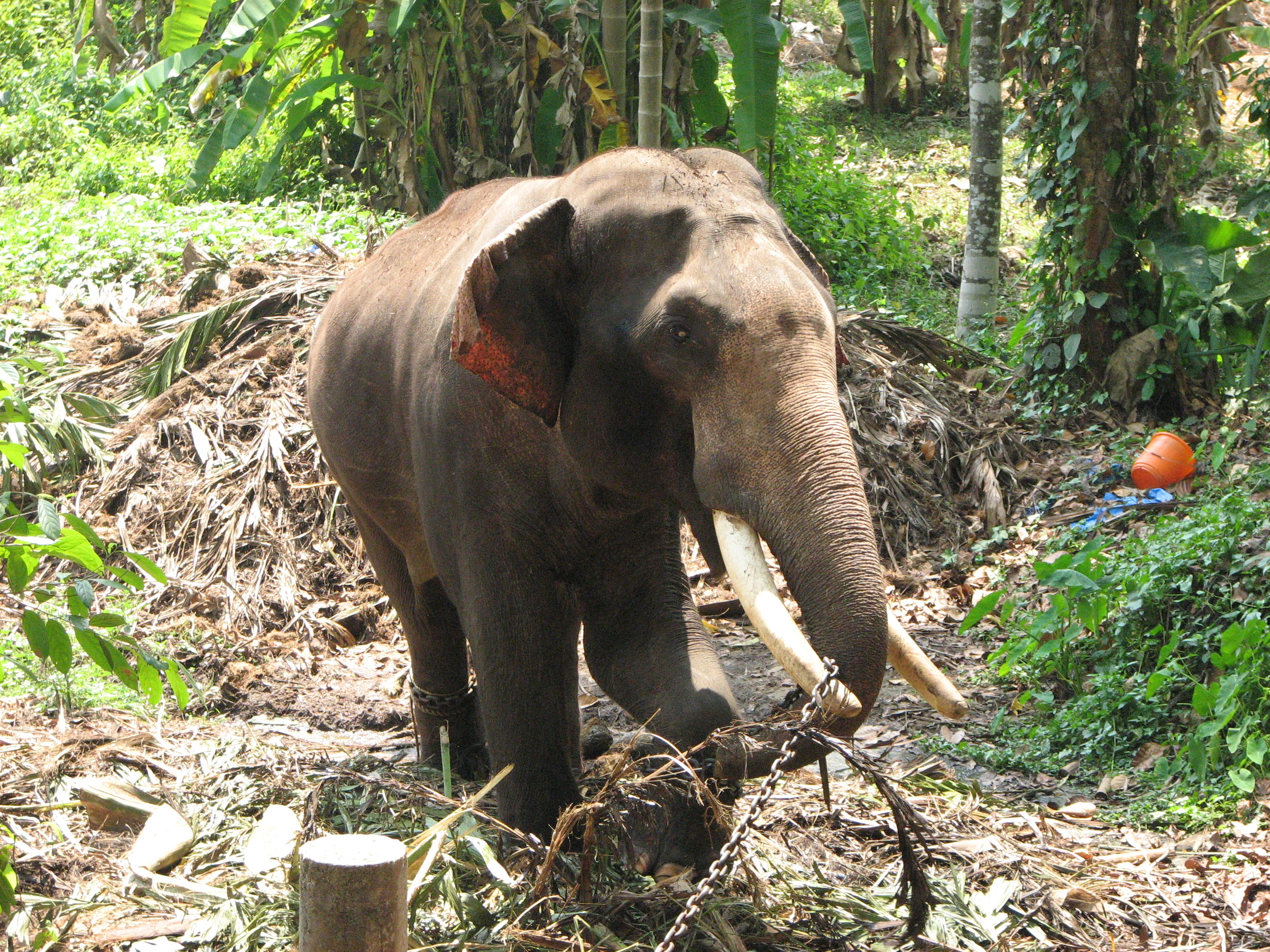
An elephant in musth trying to break his chain

In Sri Lanka and India, domesticated Asian elephants in musth are traditionally tied to a strong tree and denied food and water for a week or so, which shortens the duration of the musth, typically to five to eight days. Sedatives, like xylazine, are also sometimes used. Zoos keeping adult male elephants need strong, purpose-built enclosures to isolate males during their musth.

== Cultural depictions ==
- Valmiki, in Sundara Kanda of the Ramayana (7th to 4th centuries BCE), made reference to the Mahendra mountain shedding water like an elephant's rut juice upon being pressed by Hanuman.
- In the Matanga Lila (300 BCE to 300 CE) musth is described: "Excitement, swiftness, odor, love passion, complete florescence of the body, wrath, prowess, and fearlessness are declared to be the eight excellences of musth."
- Sangam poetry (300 BCE to 300 CE) describes musth. Kummatoor Kannanaar in Pathitrupatthu 12 describes it as follows:

It was sweet to hear of your victories and fame and I came here desiring to see you. I came with my big family, passing few mountains where noble, young male elephants with coarse hair
and swaying walks have musth flowing from their
cheek glands and elephant mothers with calves wave wild jasmine twigs, chasing striped bees that swarm on the sweet musth.

- References to elephants in musth (whose temporin secretion is often referred to as "ichor") are for example in the Raghuvaṃśa (4th–5th century CE), where Kalidasa wrote that the king's elephants drip ichor in seven streams to match the scent put forth by the seven-leaved 'sapta-cchada' (= "seven-leaf") tree (perhaps Alstonia scholaris).
- In Jules Verne's Around the World in Eighty Days (1872), Phileas Fogg buys an elephant that was being fed sugar and butter so it would go into musth for combat purposes; however, the animal had been on this regimen for only a relatively short time, so the condition had not yet presented.
- Shooting an Elephant is an essay by George Orwell written in 1936, in which he describes how an elephant in Burma had an attack of musth and killed an Indian, which in turn led to the narrator shooting the elephant.
- In his James Bond novel The Man With the Golden Gun (1965), Ian Fleming wrote that the villain Francisco Scaramanga was driven to become a cold-blooded assassin after authorities shot an elephant that he had ridden in his circus act, because the elephant went on a rampage while in musth.
- In Barry B. Longyear's 1982 science fiction novel Elephant Song, the survivors of the circus starship City of Baraboo have to face the fact that because of the circus rule that male elephants cannot troupe with the show, because they might go into musth with no warning, the elephants who survived to land on Momus are doomed to extinction.
- The Tamil movie Kumki (2012), which revolves around a mahout and his trained elephant, shows the elephant in musth toward the climax. Captive elephants are trained either for duties in temples and cultural festivals or as kumki elephants, which confront wild elephants and prevent them from entering villages. Elephants trained for temple duties are of a gentle nature and cannot face wild elephants. In the movie, a tribal village wants to hire a kumki elephant to chase away wild elephants that enter the village every harvest season. The mahout, who needs money, takes his temple-trained elephant to do the job in the vain hope that wild elephants will not enter. But wild elephants start attacking the village on the harvest day. The temple-trained elephant enters musth and thus fights with the wild elephants, killing the most notorious among the herd but dying from injuries sustained during the fight.
