= Temporin =

Elephant temporal gland secretion

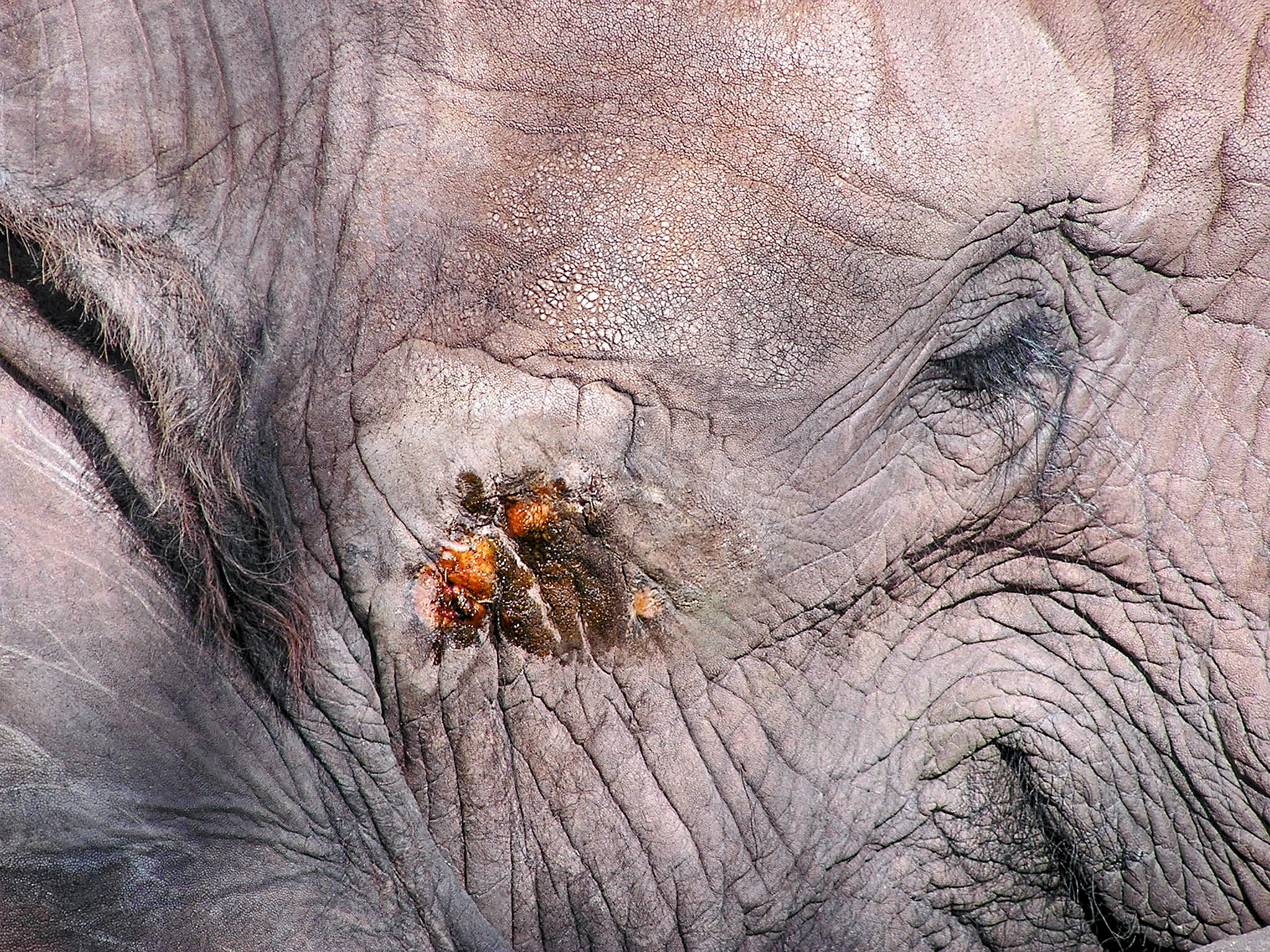
Secretion of temporins visible on an African elephant during musth (2007).

In elephants, temporin is the visible liquid secreted by temporal glands. It contains proteins, lipids (notably cholesterol), phenols, cresols and sesquiterpenes (notably farnesol and its derivatives). Temporin has a communicative function among elephant individuals in a group.

In male elephants, temporin is secreted more during the period of musth, a period of heightened sexual arousal and dominance behavior. Of note, not all temporal gland excretions in African elephant bulls necessarily represent the musth phase. Female elephants also secrete temporin; African females secrete it quite freely, whereas Asian females secrete it in advanced stage of pregnancy or soon after calving.

In old Sanskrit texts, temporin has been referred to as rut fluid (dāna, or mada) and is considered to be a symbol of potency and vigour. However, from the point of view of ancient Indian elephant science (Gajashastra), temporin is not a direct symptom of rut.
