= Gajashastra =

Sanskrit elephantology treatise

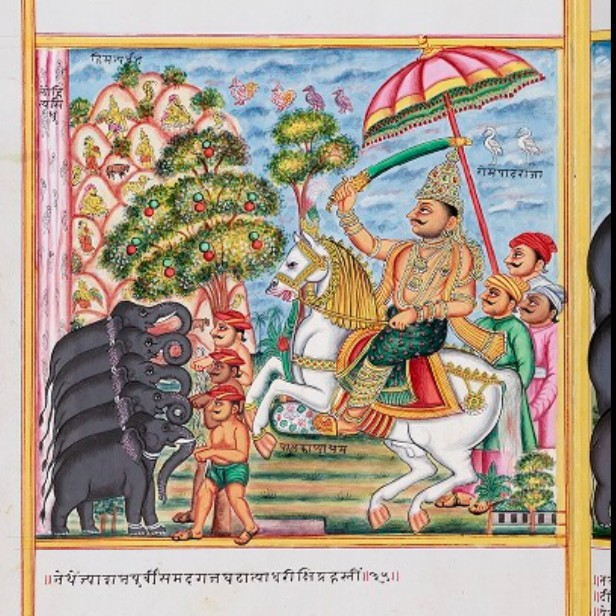
An Illustrated folio from a 19th-century Sanskrit manuscript of the Gajashastra

The Gajashastra (Sanskrit: गजशास्त्र romanized: Gajaśāstra lit. 'Science of Elephants') is a Sanskrit treatise on elephantology attributed to the sage Palakapya. It forms part of the wider branch of Gajayurveda (Ayurvedic elephant science) and discusses the capture, training, characteristics, and management of elephants. Gajashastra focuses primarily on the healthy and functional aspects of elephants, whereas related works such as Hastyayurveda deal with anatomy, diseases, and treatment.

== Development ==
=== Authorship and background ===
The Gajashastra is traditionally ascribed to sage Palakapya. The Matanga lila describes Palakapya as the son of the hermit Samagayana, born near the Lauhitya (Brahmaputra) river in the Himalayan foothills. The Gajashastra opens with the people of Anga lamenting to King Romapada about the destruction of their crops by wild elephants. In response, the king orders that the elephants be captured and brought to the royal stables. There, he encounters a sage compassionately tending to the wounded and distressed elephants. This sage introduces himself as Palakapya. The king, moved by the suffering of the captured elephants, engages in dialogue with Palakapya, who expounds on the ethical care, training, and management of elephants, forming the core of the Gajashastra.

=== Chronology ===
Chronologically, H.P. Shastri and other Indologists place Palakapya around the 5th-6th century BCE, roughly contemporary with the later Sūtra period and the medical figure Sushruta. The work's references and form suggest that it predates or is roughly contemporary with Kautilya's Arthashastra (c. 3rd century BCE), which also contains a section on elephant physicians (Hastipracāra), implying that the science of elephants was already well developed by that time.

=== Manuscripts and editions ===
The extant manuscript of Gajashastra was transcribed from Telugu into Devanagari by Pandit V. Vijayaraghavacharya in 1926 under the patronage of Sri Balasaheb Shrinivasrao Pant, the King of Awadh. The king, himself a scholar and painter, added 136 illustrations of elephants to the manuscript. A modern edited version with commentary by Dr. Siddharth Y. Wakankar and Prof. B. V. Mhaiskar was published by Bharatiya Kala Prakashan (Delhi) in 2006. An earlier Tanjore edition contained only the Sanskrit text without commentary.

== Contents ==
=== Structure ===
The Gajashastra is divided into nineteen chapters (prakaranas), though the Tanjore version only contains ten. The first eight prakaranas in both editions are identical in content. In the Tanjore version, the ninth prakarana consolidates material that appears as chapters ten to nineteen in the more complete manuscript. The tenth prakarana of the Tanjore edition includes topics such as pregnancy in elephants, rut (musth) formation, and the rearing of calves.The contents of each prakarana are summarized in the table below:

Gajashastra Chapters and their Contents
Prakarana	Content
1. Origin of Palakapya	Narrates the story of Sage Palakapya, said to be "delivered" by a female elephant. Scholars interpret this as an orphan child rescued and raised by elephants. The chapter establishes Palakapya's expertise in elephant science.
2. Origin of Elephants	Origin of Elephants - Describes the divine creation of elephants (Diggajas) - celestial elephants with four tusks and wings.
3. Curse of Elephants	Curse of Elephants - Explains how elephants were cursed and banished from heaven to live on earth.
4. The Forests (Gajavanas)	Enumerates sixteen habitats (Gajavanas), eight main and eight subsidiary, located in and around the Himalayan and Gangetic region. Each forest breeds elephants of distinct traits.
5. Age of Elephants	Details growth milestones: monthly development for the first year, annual growth till age ten, and decade-wise stages afterward. Average lifespan is noted to be 100-120 years.
6. Elephants of Different Regions	Compares elephants of various provinces, noting differences in temperament, strength, and intelligence.
7. Keddah	Describes techniques for capturing wild elephants (Keddah system), taming, and early-stage training. Emphasizes humane handling and gradual socialization into herds or royal stables.
8. Four classes of Elephants	Classifies elephants by disposition such as Bhadra (noble), Manda (dull), Mridu (gentle), and Tikshna (fierce), based on temperament and color.
9. Creed or Nature of Elephants	Discusses the innate psychological characteristics of elephants, correlating behavioral traits with auspiciousness.
10. Varna (Color)	Explains color variations and their symbolism in Elephants
11. Chaya (Complexion)	Elaborates on skin texture, luster, and subtones. (i.e, a healthy elephant's complexion is like the sun, ghrita (ghee), or honey).
12. Odour of Elephants	Notes the characteristic scent of healthy elephants, and abnormal odors that indicate disease.
13. Strength and Patience of Elephants	Elaborates on various training methods to train the elephant's physical power, stamina, and temperament.
14. Satwa	Talks about elephants' mental balance, mood, and reactions to human handlers.
15. Gait of Elephants	Analyzes walking patterns (gati). Calves walk within an hour of birth, attain stability by the 7th month, and speed by the 8th.
16. Marks on the Body (Samudrika)	Illustrations in the manuscript depict auspicious and inauspicious body markings on an Elephant.
17. Congenital Defects	Lists around 40 deformities (i.e: extra limbs, missing parts, deafness, or dull hue of the skin)
18. Measurements of Elephants	Provides standardized methods for measuring elephants using units such as the hasta (hand length), aratni, and yojana. Defines paramanu similarly to the Charaka Samhita.
19. The Seat on the Back (Howdah Design)	Describes the construction and placement of the royal seat or howdah on elephants.

== See also ==
- Matanga Lila
- Shalihotra
