= Matanga Lila =

Sanskrit treatise on elephants

Cover page of the English translation of Matanga Lila

Matanga Lila is a treatise in Sanskrit dealing with the life and behaviour of elephants. The title has been translated as Elephant-sport. It is a treatise in 263 stanzas divided into twelve chapters of varying length. In the treatise, the author's name has been mentioned as Nilakantha, but nothing more is known about the author. From the popularity of the text in the region now comprising the modern state of Kerala in India, it is thought that the author might have lived there. Also, nothing definite is known about the date of the work.

Matanga Lila is a text about the Indian elephant science, which is a technical science dealing with the taming and training of elephants, and also the anatomy and zoological features of elephants. Franklin Edgerton, who published a translation of the text to English, has argued that the content of the text represents the codification of orally-transmitted traditions of practical knowledge. In support of this contention he noted that the "signature texts such as the Matanga-Lila" contain over 130 technical words, for which there are no clear Sanskrit etymologies.

== Outline of contents ==
The book is divided into 12 chapters. The first chapter describes the mythic origin of elephants. It also contains a description of the various `castes' of elephants. Chapter 2 describes favorable marks of elephants. This chapter also describes the different sounds produced by elephants. Chapter 3 describes the unfavorable marks. They include the number of nails, presence of external testes, undesirable marks on the trunk, on the penis, on the tail and on other parts of the body. Chapter 4 deals with longevity of elephants and Chapter 5 describes the various stages in the life of an elephant and also gives names of the various body parts of elephants. Chapter 6 deals with measurements of elephants. Chapter 7, consisting of only three stanzas, deals with the prices of elephants. Chapter 8 is on marks of character. This chapter also contains a classification of elephants based on their varying sensitivity to stimuli. Chapter 9 deals with the state of mast and Chapter 10 with catching of elephants. Chapter 11, the longest in the whole work is titled "On keeping of elephants and their daily including seasonal regimen". The 12th and last chapter deals with the character and activities of elephant managers. Various commands including visual signs, oral, percussion, and prodding are given. There is a section describing how and when these commands are to be used so that the elephant will obey the mahout.

== Some other Sanskrit books on elephant-science ==
There are a few other well-known texts in Sanskrit dealing with the science of elephantology.

- Palkapya Muni (1894). Hasthi Ayurveda. Sivaji Nagar, Pune, Maharastra: Sarawaathi Grantha Bhundar.(Sanskrit text only; edited by Sivadatta Sarma)
- Palakapya Muni (1958). Gaja Sastram. Thanjavur: T. M. S. S. M. Library. (Edited with translation in Tamil by K.S.Subrahmanya Sastri. Summary in English by S. Gopalan)
- Bhulokamalla – Somasevara III. Manaollasa (Gajavahyali-Abhilashitarta Chintamani) (PDF).
