= Crèche =

Crèche or creche (from Latin cripia "crib, cradle") may refer to:

- Nativity scene, a group of figures arranged to represent the birth of Jesus Christ
- Child care center, an organization of adults who take care of children in place of their parents
- Preschool or nursery school
- Crèche (zoology), animals taking care of young that are not their own
