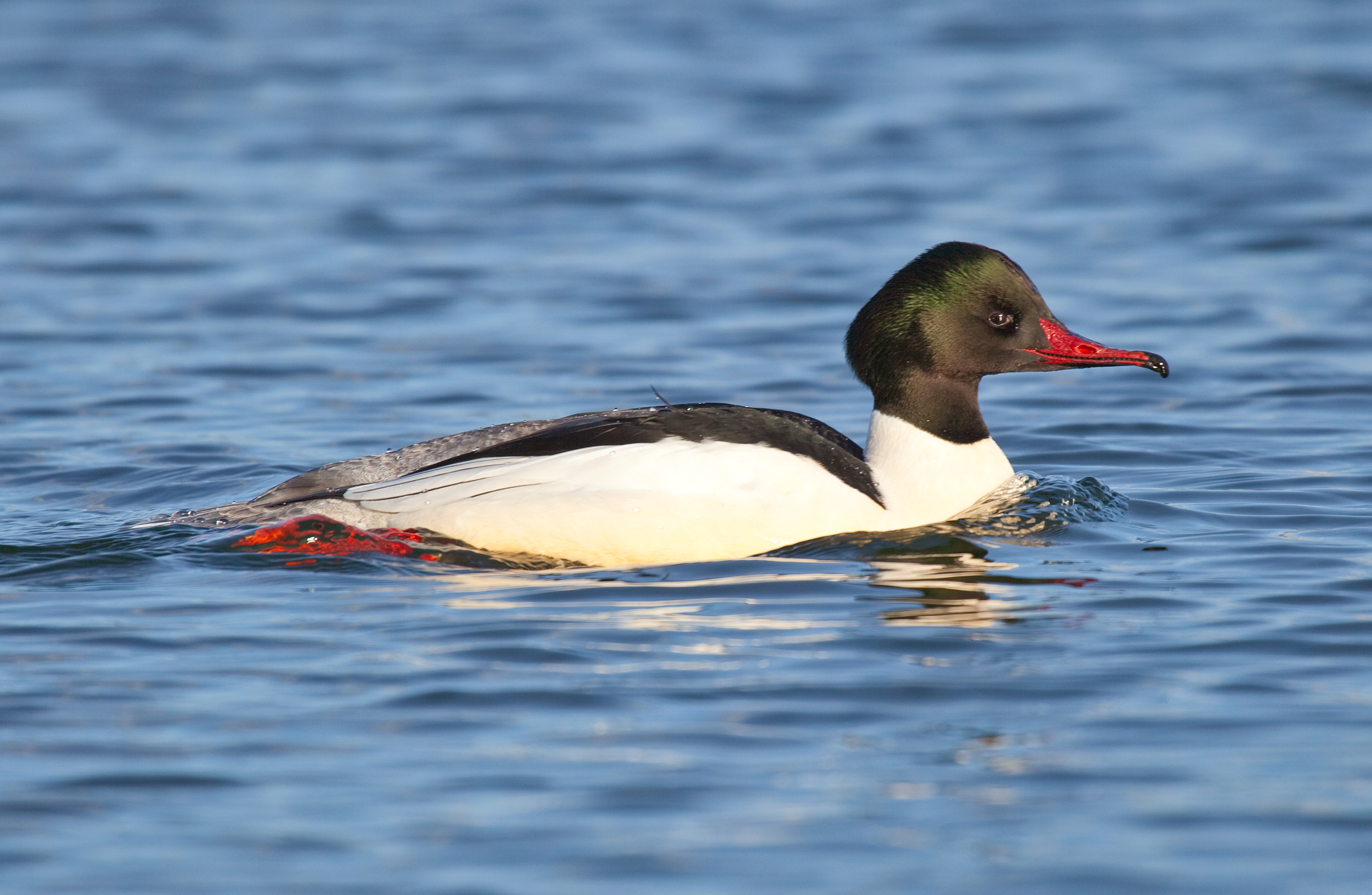
- M. m. merganser, male in Vaxholm, Sweden
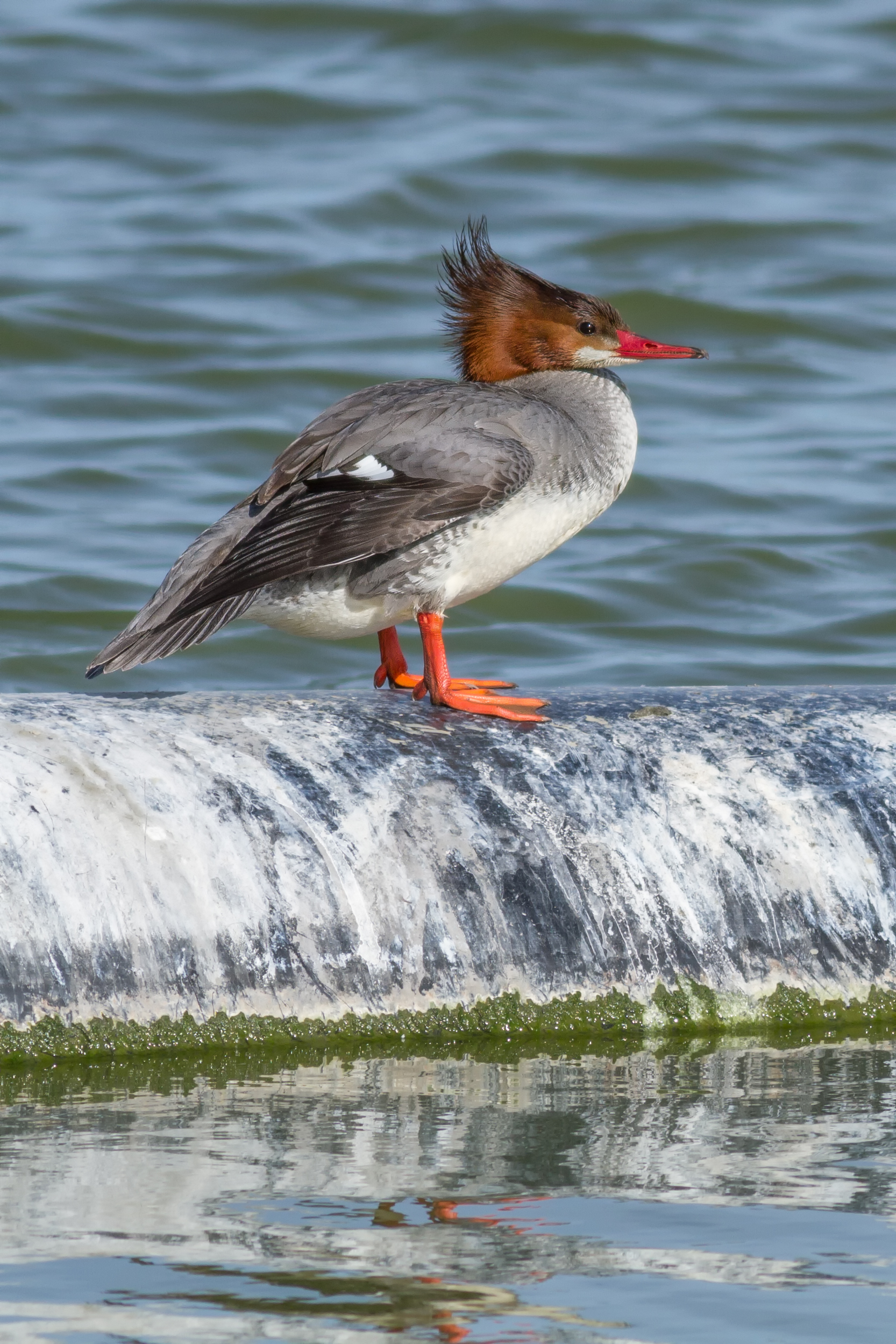
- M. m. americanus, female

Conservation status
- Least Concern (IUCN 3.1)

Scientific classification
- Kingdom: Animalia
- Phylum: Chordata
- Class: Aves
- Order: Anseriformes
- Family: Anatidae
- Genus: Mergus
- Species: M. merganser

Binomial name
- Mergus merganser Linnaeus, 1758

Subspecies
- 3, see text
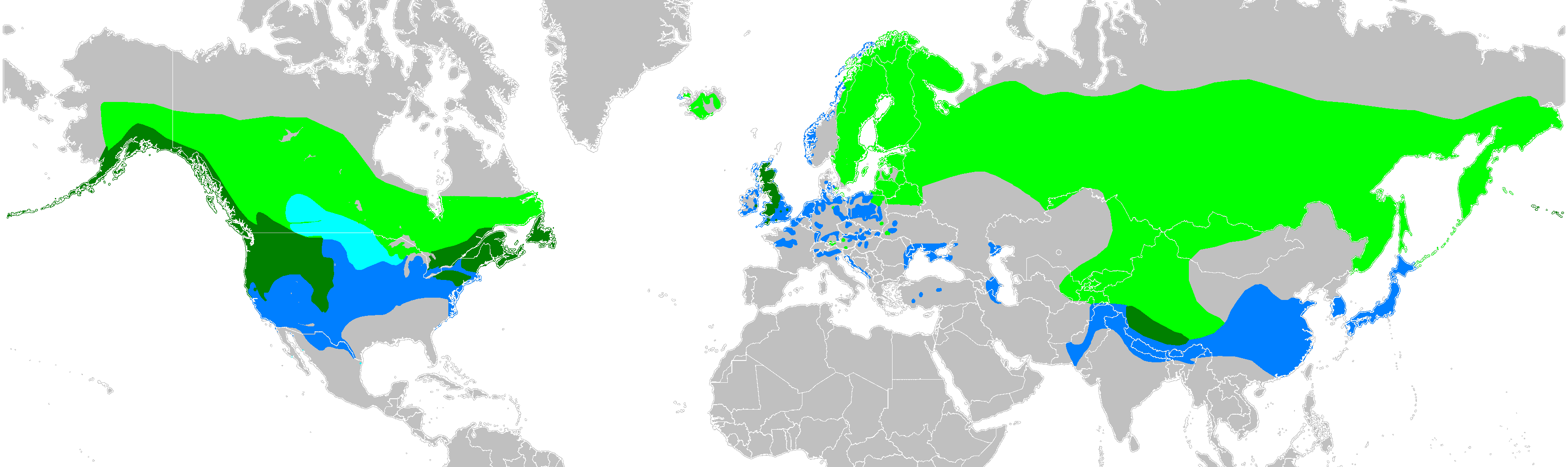
- M. merganser range Breeding Resident Passage Non-breeding

Synonyms
- Merganser americanus Cassin, 1852

= Common merganser =

Common merganser Temporal range: Pleistocene–present

Species of bird

The common merganser or goosander (Mergus merganser) is a large sea duck of rivers and lakes in forested areas of Europe, Asia, and North America. The common merganser eats mainly fish. It nests in holes in trees. The name "common merganser" is used in North America, while "goosander" is used in Eurasia.

== Taxonomy ==
The first formal description of the common merganser was written by Swedish naturalist Carl Linnaeus in 1758 in the 10th edition of his Systema Naturae. He introduced the current binomial name Mergus merganser. The genus name is a Latin word used by Pliny and other Roman authors to refer to an unspecified waterbird, and merganser is derived from mergus and anser, Latin for "goose". In 1843 John James Audubon used the name "Buff-breasted Merganser" in addition to "goosander" in his book The Birds of America.

The three subspecies differ in only minor detail:

Image	Subspecies	Description	Distribution
	M. m. merganser – Linnaeus, 1758		Throughout northern Europe and northern Asiatic Russia.
	M. m. orientalis – Gould, 1845 (syn. M. m. comatus – Salvadori, 1895)	Slightly larger than M. m. merganser, it has a more slender bill.	Central Asian mountains.
	M. m. americanus – Cassin, 1852	Its bill is broader-based than in M. m. merganser, and a black bar crosses the white inner wing (visible in flight) on males.	found in North America.

== Description ==
It is 58–72 cm (23–28 1/2 in) long with a 78–97 cm (30 1/2–38 in) wingspan and a weight of 0.9–2.1 kg (2 lb 0 oz – 4 lb 10 oz); males are on average slightly larger than females, but with some overlap. Like other species in the genus Mergus, it has a crest of longer head feathers, but these usually lie smoothly rounded behind the head and do not normally form an erect crest. Adult males in breeding plumage are easily distinguished, the body white with a variable salmon-pink tinge, the head black with an iridescent green sheen, the rump and tail grey, and the wings largely white on the inner half, black on the outer half. Females and males in "eclipse" (non-breeding plumage, July to October) are largely grey, with a reddish-brown head, white chin, and white secondary feathers on the wing. Juveniles (both sexes) are similar to adult females but also show a short black-edged white stripe between the eye and bill. The bill and legs are red to brownish-red, brightest on adult males, dullest on juveniles.

== Behaviour ==
=== Feeding ===
As with other mergansers, these piscivorous ducks have serrated edges to their bills to help them grip their prey, so they are often known as "sawbills". In addition to fish, they take a wide range of other aquatic prey, such as molluscs, crustaceans, worms, insect larvae, and amphibians; more rarely, small mammals and birds may be taken. As in other birds with this trait, the salmon-pink colouration shown variably by males is probably dietary-derived from the carotenoid pigments found in some crustaceans and fish. When not diving for food, they are usually observed swimming on the surface of the water or resting on rocks in the middle of rivers or hidden in the vegetation along riverbanks, or (in winter) on the edge of floating ice.

=== Habits ===
The common merganser is equally at home in salt and fresh water. In larger streams and rivers, they float down with the current for a few miles and either fly or, more commonly, fish their way back. When swimming leisurely, they both float on top and swim deep in the water like cormorants, especially when swimming upstream. They often sit on a rock in the middle of the water, similar to cormorants, with their wings half-open to the sun. To rise from the water, they flap along the surface. Once they are airborne, their flight is strong and fast.

They often fish in a group by forming a semicircle and driving the fish into shallow water where they are easier to catch. Their normal vocalisation is a low, harsh croak, but during the breeding season, males and juveniles produce a plaintive, soft whistle. One or more birds will remain on sentry duty to warn the flock of approaching danger. If disturbed, they will often disgorge food before moving. They move clumsily on land, running only when necessary in a very upright position similar to penguins, frequently falling and stumbling.

=== Breeding ===
Nesting is usually in a tree cavity, so the species requires mature forest as its breeding habitat; they also readily use large nest boxes where these are available, requiring an entrance hole 15 cm (6 in) in diameter. In treeless areas such as the mountains of Central Asia, they use holes in cliffs and steep, high banks, sometimes at considerable distances from the water. The female lays 6–17 (most often 8–12) white to yellowish eggs, and raises one brood per season. Eggs measure 6–7.2 cm (2.4–2.8 in) in length and 4.3–5 cm (1.7–2.0 in) in width. The ducklings are carried by the mother on her back to rivers or lakes immediately after hatching, where they feed on freshwater invertebrates and small fish fry, fledging at 60–70 days of age. The young are sexually mature at two years of age. Common mergansers are known to form crèches, with single females having been observed with over 70 ducklings at one time.

=== Movements ===
The species is a partial migrant, with birds moving away from areas where rivers and large lakes freeze in the winter, but resident where waters remain open. Birds from Eastern North America migrate south in small groups to the United States wherever lakes and rivers are ice-free; on the milder Pacific coast, they are permanent residents. Scandinavian and Russian birds also migrate southwards, but western European birds, and a few in Japan, are largely resident. In some populations, the males also show distinct moult migration, leaving the breeding grounds as soon as the young hatch to spend the summer (June to September) elsewhere. In particular, most of the Western European male population migrates north to estuaries in Finnmark in northern Norway (principally Tanafjord) to moult, leaving the females to care for the ducklings. Much smaller numbers of males also use estuaries in eastern Scotland as a moulting area.

== Status and conservation ==
Overall, the species is not threatened, although illegal persecution by game-fishing interests is a problem in certain regions. In February 2020, a rare common merganser sighting was documented in Central Park, New York; the bird showed clear signs of distress, with its beak caught in a piece of debris.

Within Western Europe, there has been a marked southward expansion of the breeding range from Scandinavia in the breeding range since about 1850, colonising Scotland in 1871, England in 1941, and also a strong increase in the population in the Alps. They are very rare in Ireland, with regular breeding restricted to a few pairs in County Wicklow.

The goosander is one of the species covered by the Agreement on the Conservation of African-Eurasian Migratory Waterbirds.

Images
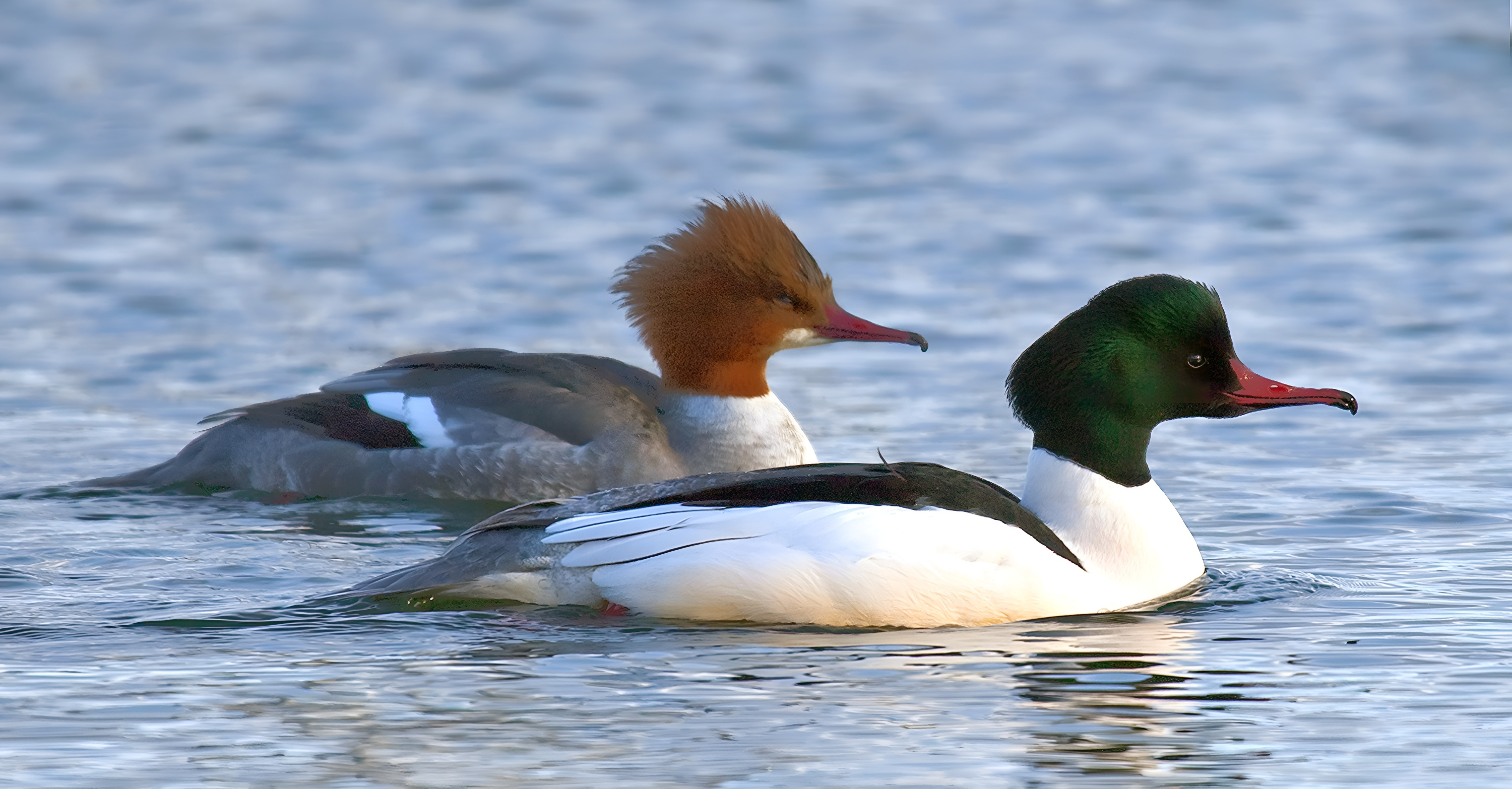
Mergus merganser couple, Vaxholm, Sweden

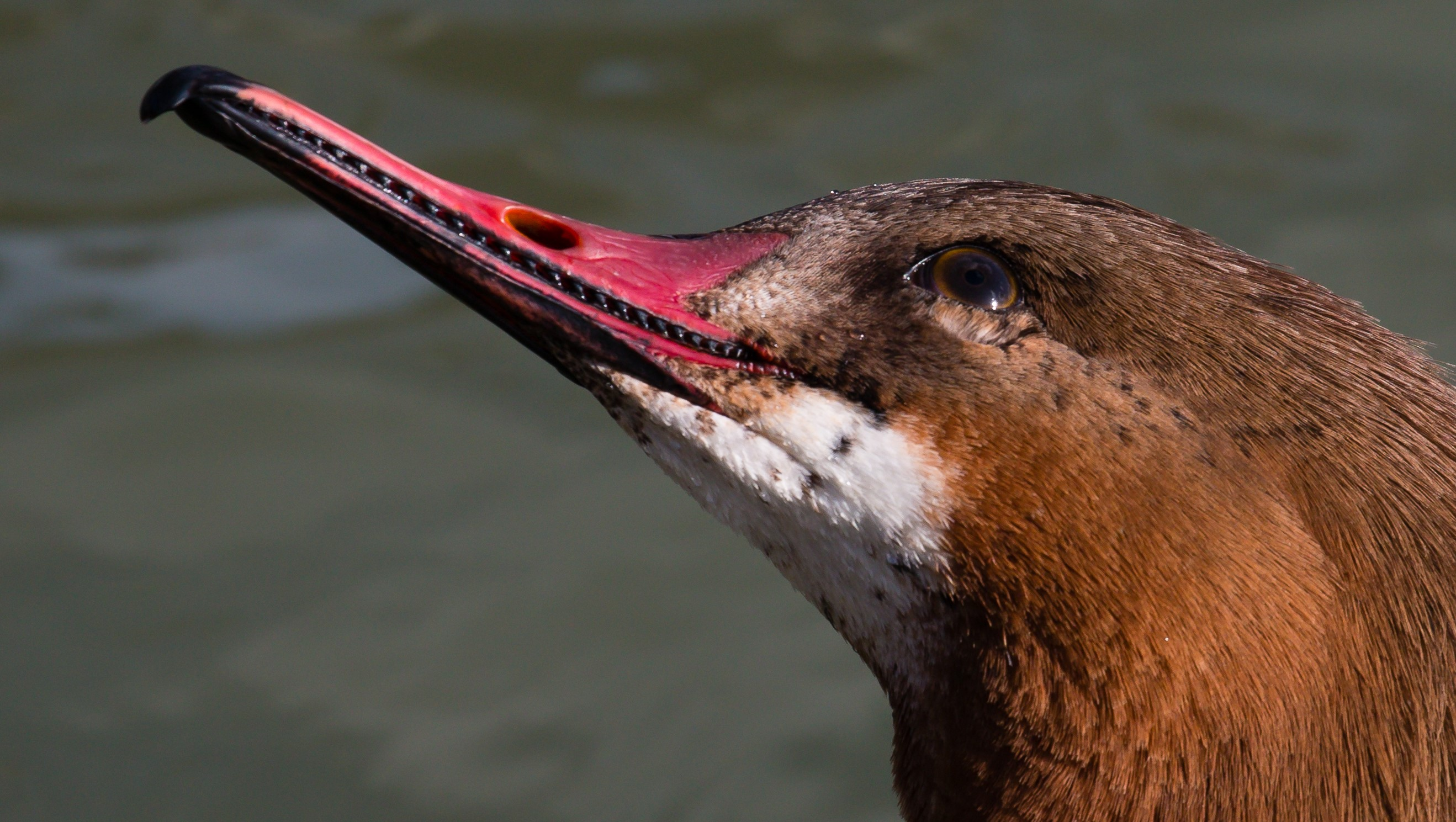
Female goosander's bill showing the serrated edge

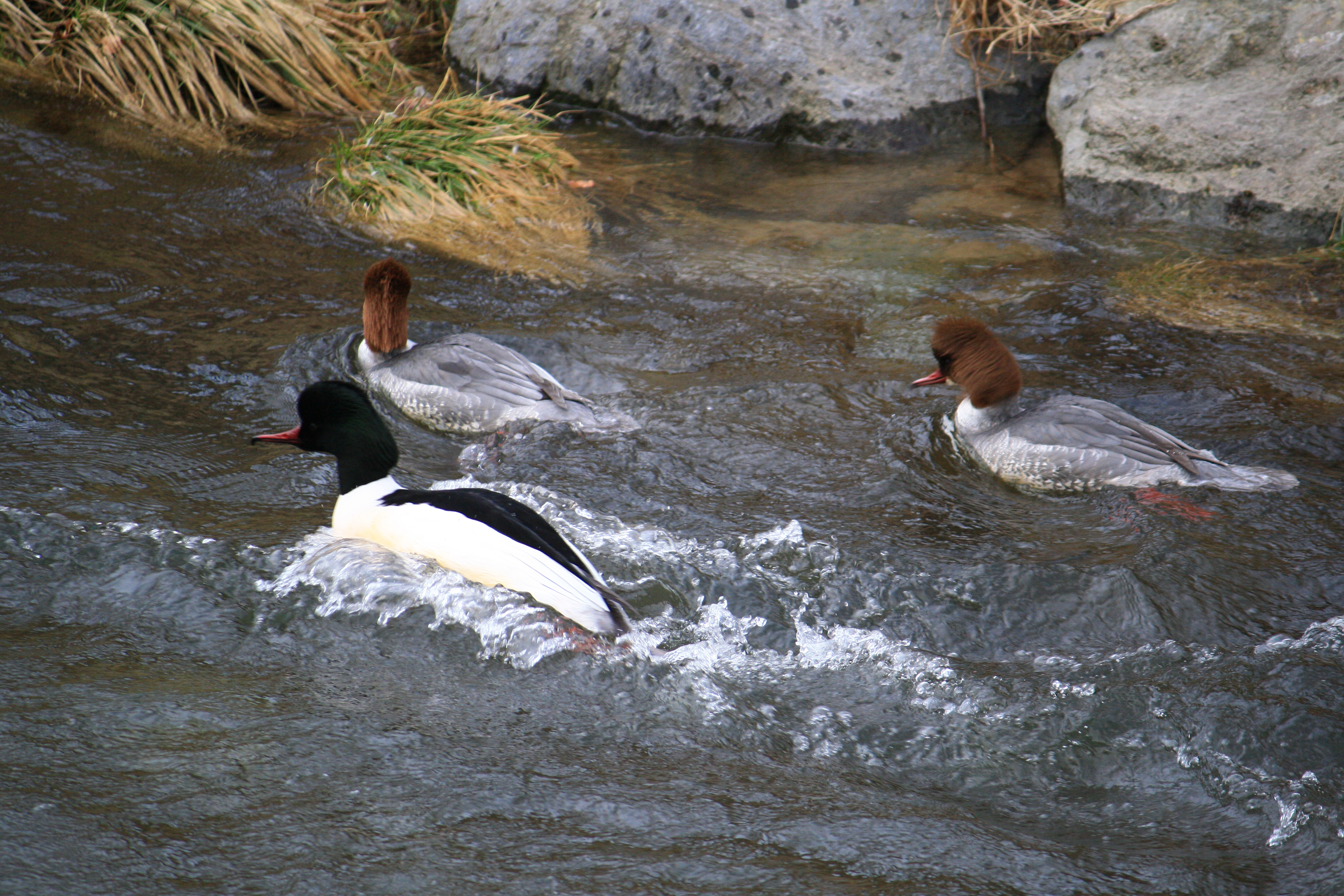
Couple and single female on the Jona in Switzerland

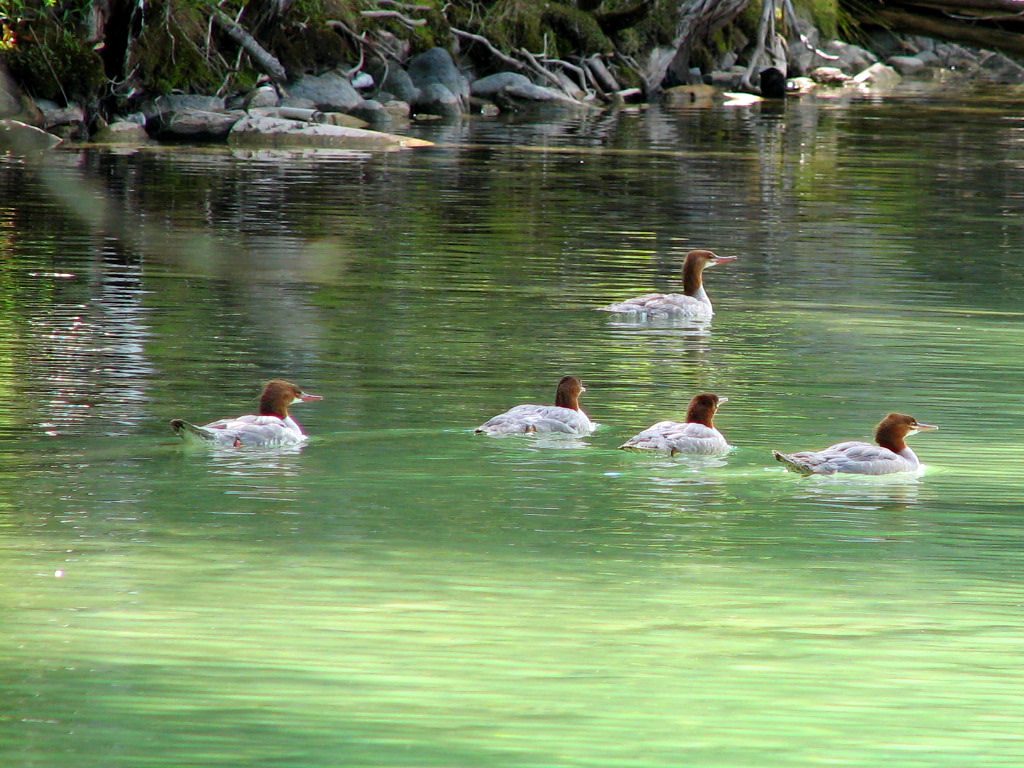
M. m. americanus, female and juveniles

M. m. americanus
female with chick on back

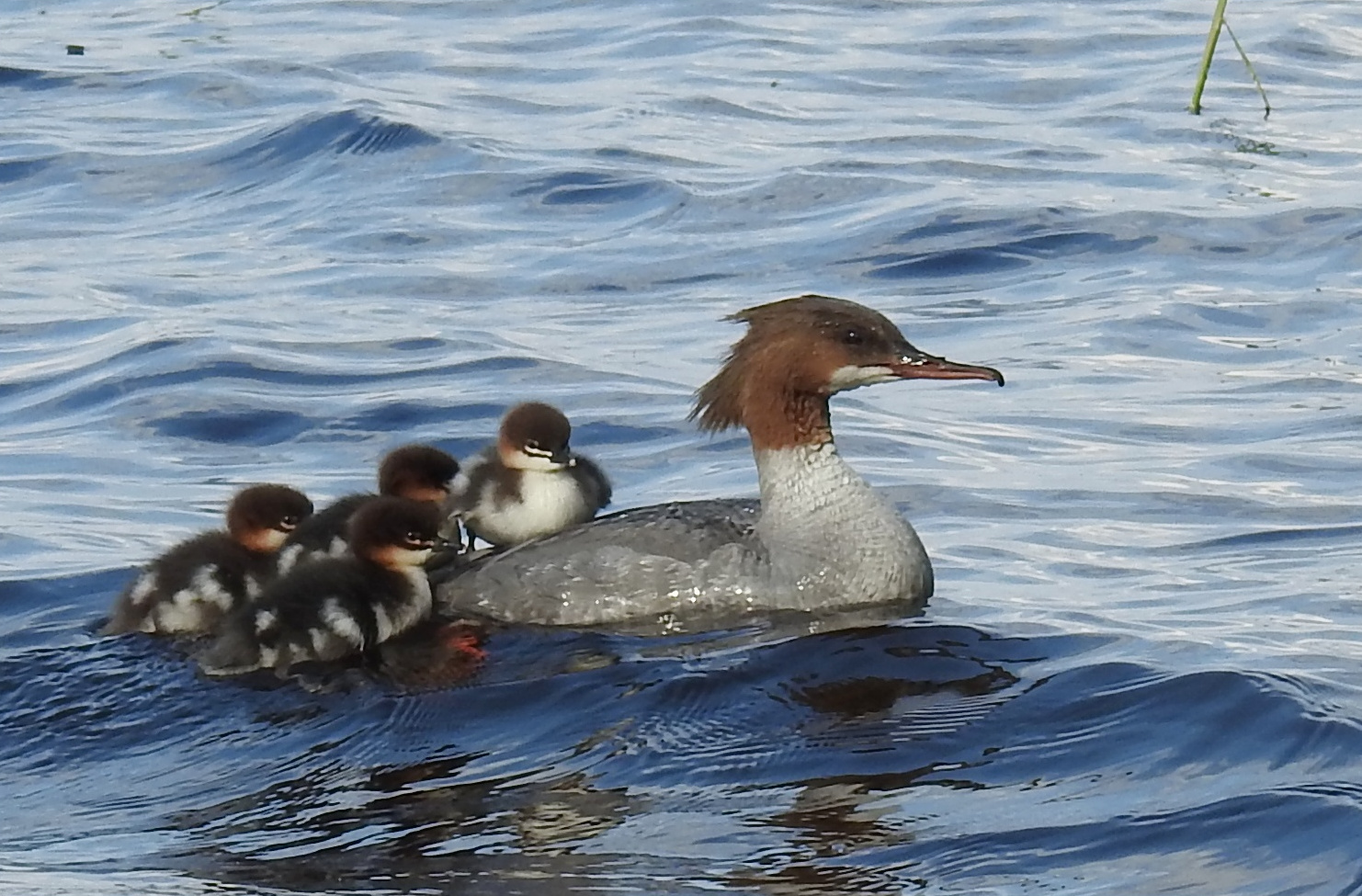
Female with four chicks on back

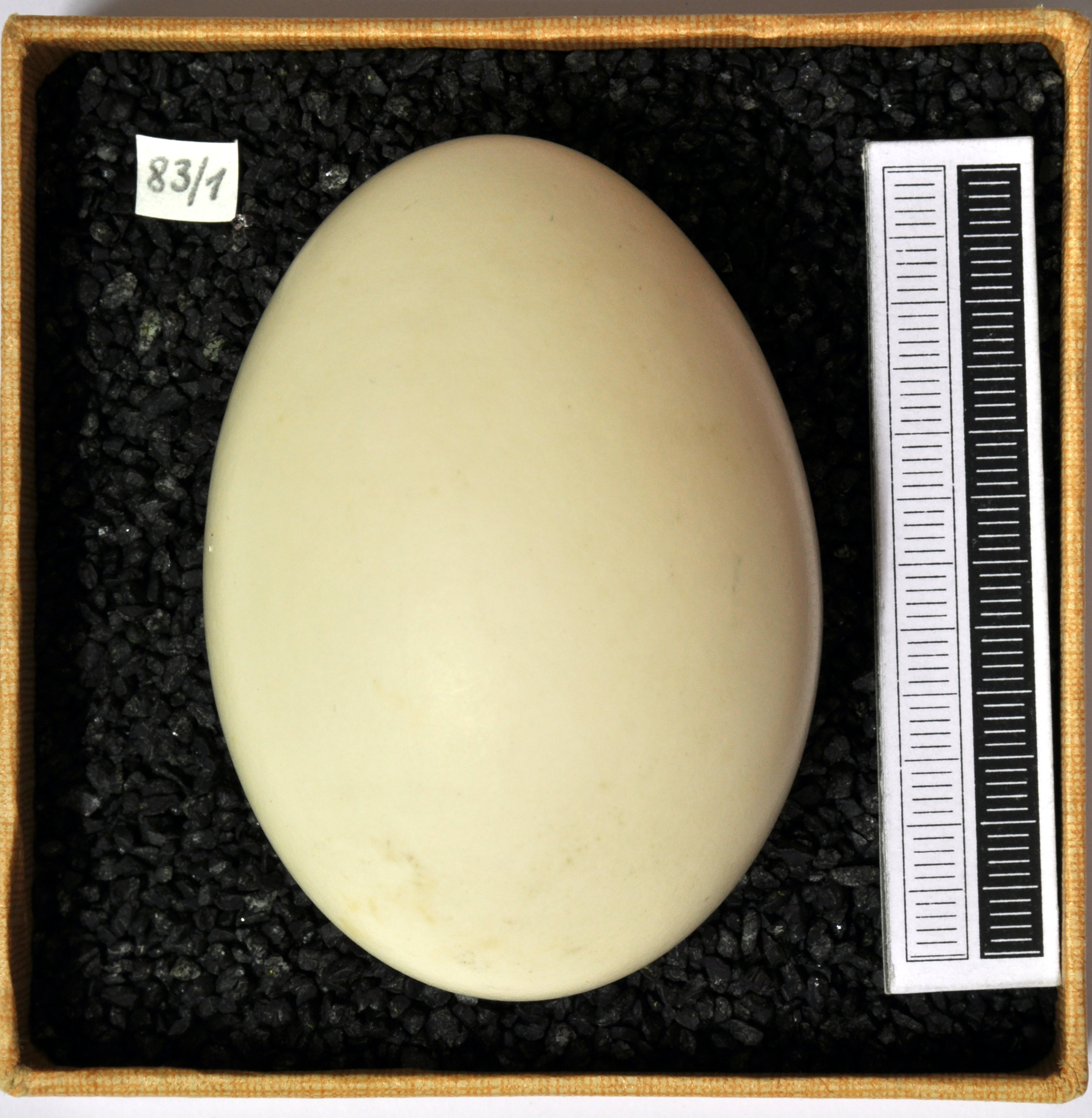
Egg, Collection Museum Wiesbaden

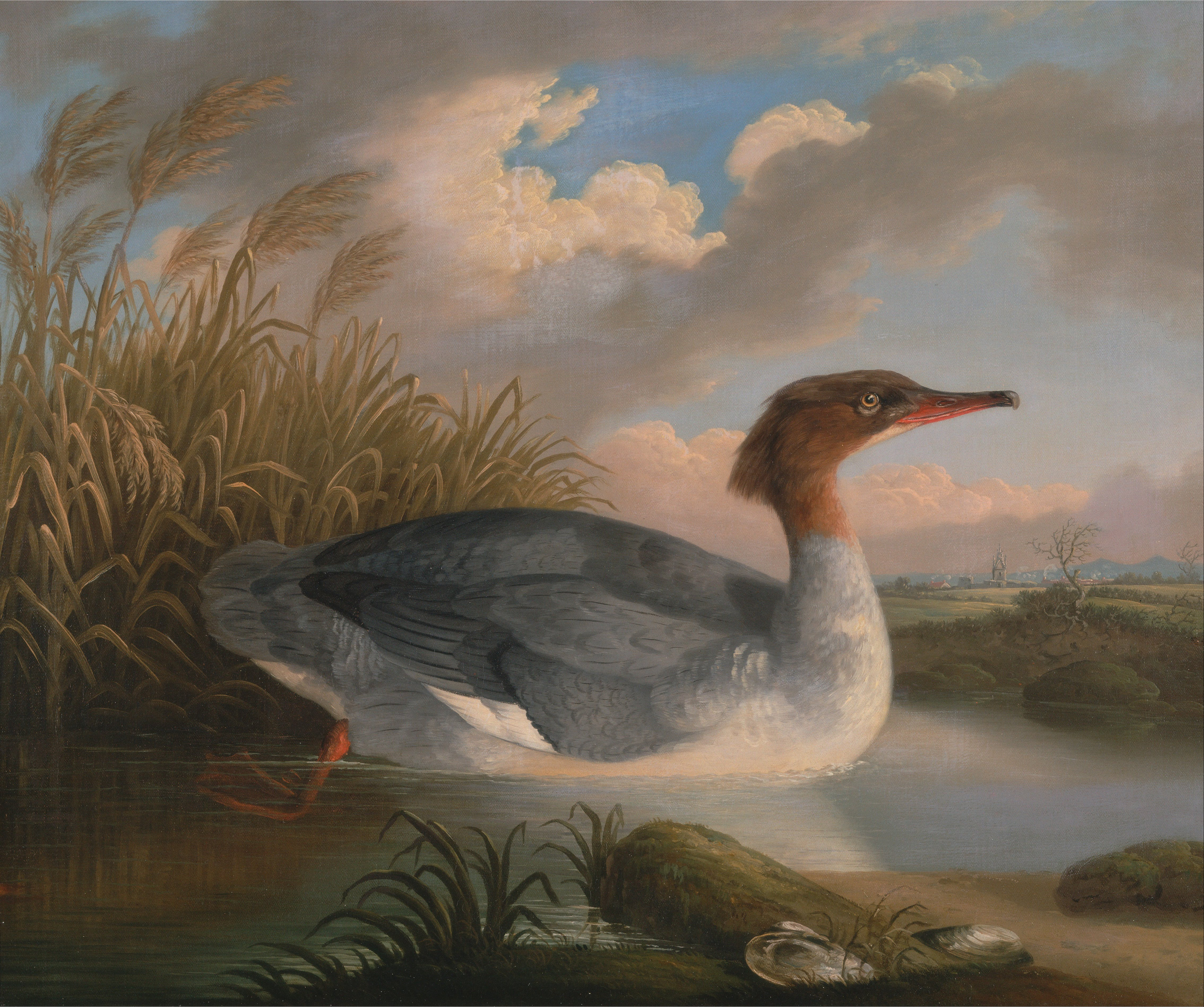
Robert Wilkinson Padley - A Goosander, 1817

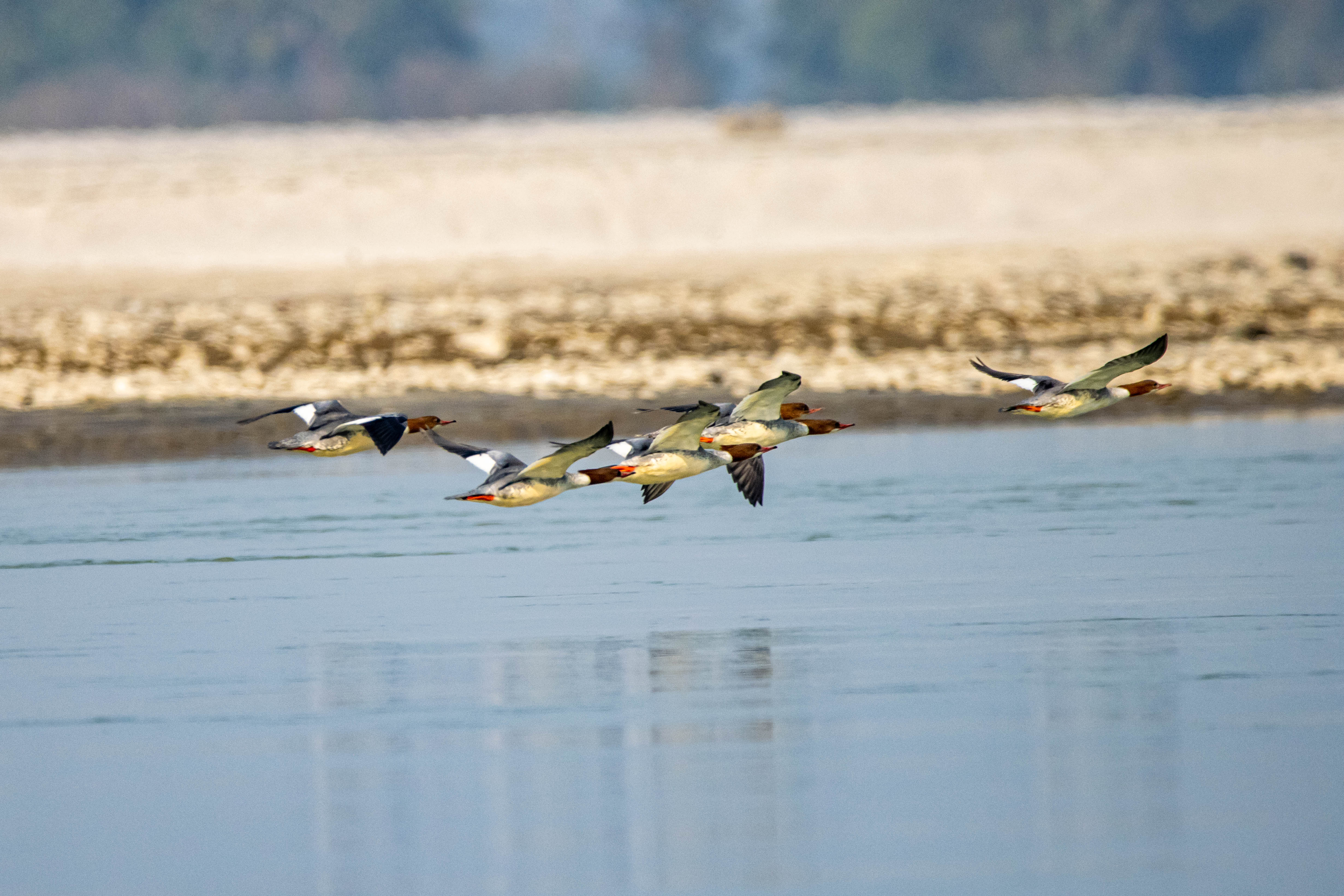
In flight at Koshi Tappu Wildlife Reserve, Nepal

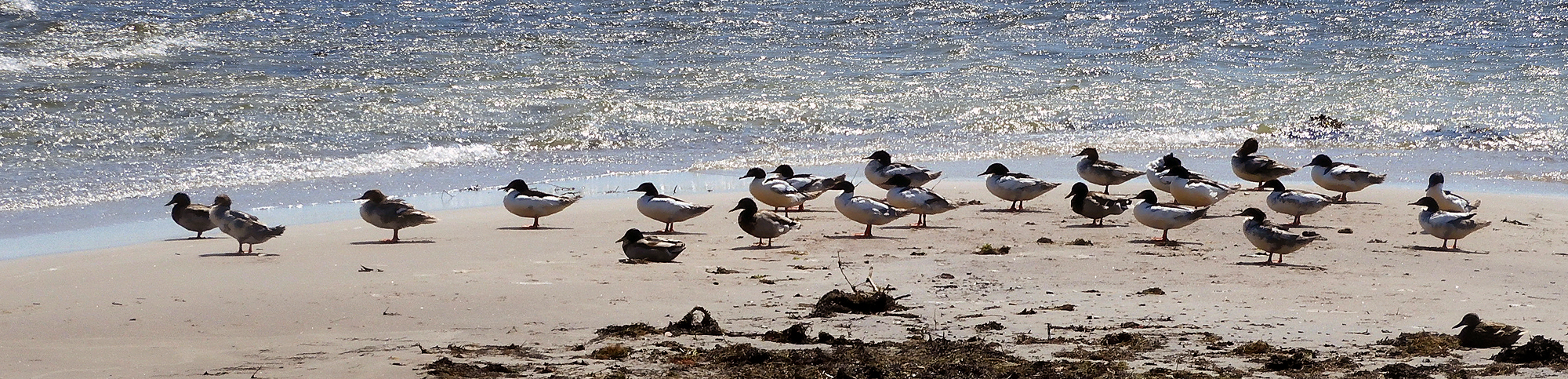
A flock resting in Ystad, 2024
