= Pondus (disambiguation) =

Pondus is a Norwegian comic strip and magazine.

Pondus may also refer to:

- The Pondus Penguin, a character in the Danish children's book, Pondus the Penguin, written and illustrated by Ivar Myrhøj in 1966
- Pondus, brand name of the drug Nandrolone propionate
  - Neo-Pondus, brand name of the drug Androisoxazole

== See also ==
- pH (pondus hydrogenii)
