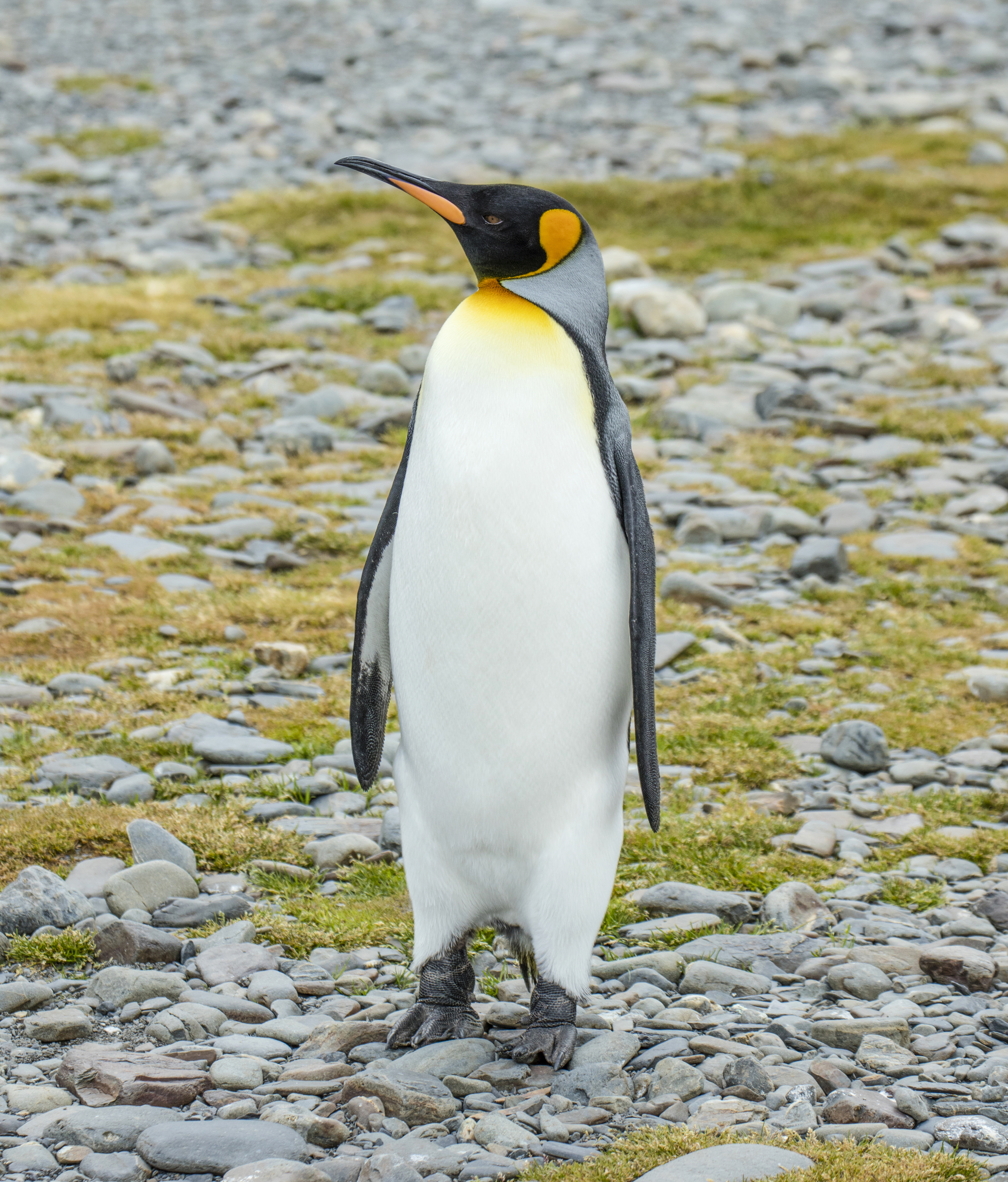
- King penguin Fortuna Bay, South Georgia
- Calls

Conservation status
- Least Concern (IUCN 3.1)

Scientific classification
- Kingdom: Animalia
- Phylum: Chordata
- Class: Aves
- Order: Sphenisciformes
- Family: Spheniscidae
- Genus: Aptenodytes
- Species: A. patagonicus

Binomial name
- Aptenodytes patagonicus Miller, JF, 1778
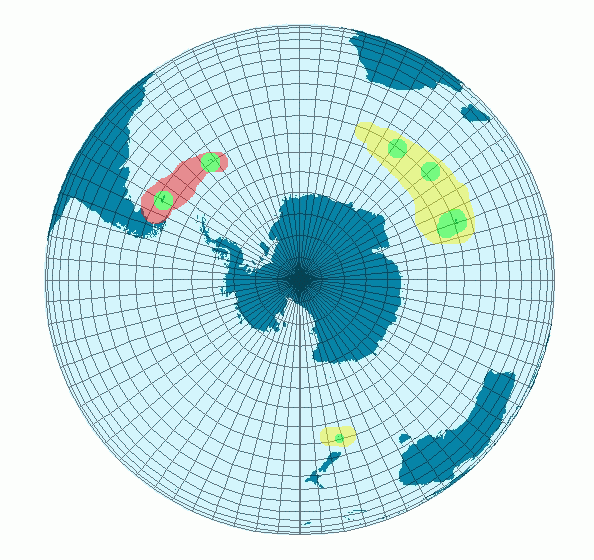
- Red: Aptenodytes patagonicus patagonicus Yellow: Aptenodytes patagonicus halli Green: breeding areas

= King penguin =

Species of bird

The king penguin (Aptenodytes patagonicus) is the second largest species of penguin, smaller than but somewhat similar in appearance to the emperor penguin.

King penguins mainly eat lanternfish, squid, and krill. On foraging trips, king penguins repeatedly dive to over 100 metres (300 ft), and have been recorded at depths greater than 300 metres (1,000 ft). Predators of the king penguin include giant petrels, skuas, the snowy sheathbill, the leopard seal, and the orca.

The king penguin breeds on the subantarctic islands at the northern reaches of Antarctica, South Georgia, southern Argentina, and other temperate islands of the region. It also lives on Macquarie Island in the Southern Ocean and the Falkland Islands.

This bird was exploited commercially in the past for its blubber, oil, meat, and feathers. Today it is fully protected.

== Taxonomy ==
In 1778, the English illustrator John Frederick Miller included a hand-coloured engraving of the king penguin in his Icones animalium et plantarum. He coined the binomial name Aptenodytes patagonica and specified the type locality as the Mari antarctico, the Antarctic Ocean. The locality was restricted to South Georgia by Gregory Mathews in 1911.

=== Purported subspecies ===
The International Ornithologists' Union considers the species monotypic, with no subspecies recognised. However, some taxonomic authorities accept two subspecies, A. p. patagonicus and A. p. halli; in this system, A. p. patagonicus is found in the South Atlantic, and A. p. halli in the South Indian Ocean (on the Kerguelen Islands, Crozet Islands, Prince Edward Islands, and Heard Island and McDonald Islands) and on Macquarie Island.

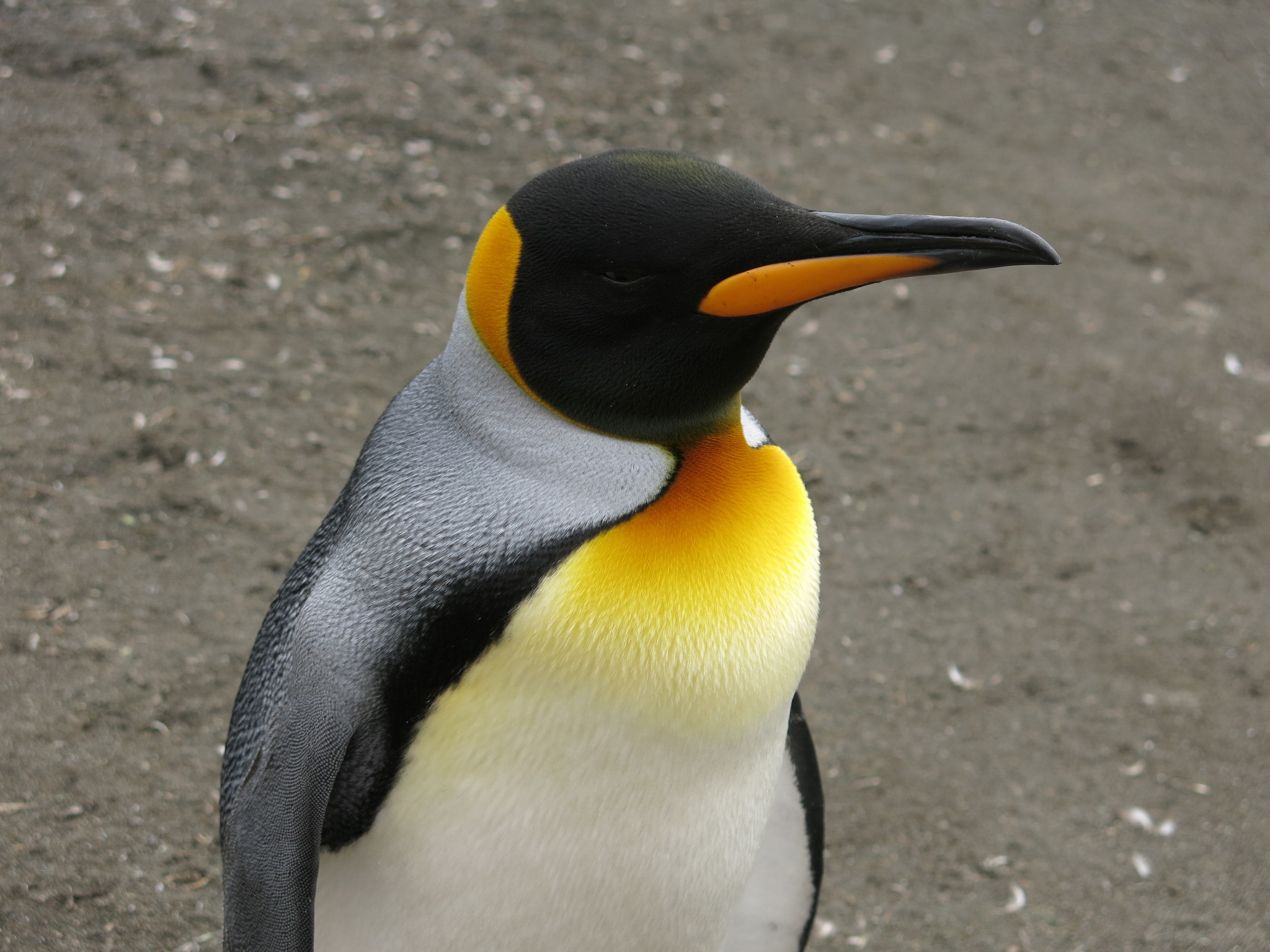
A. p. halli, at Macquarie Island

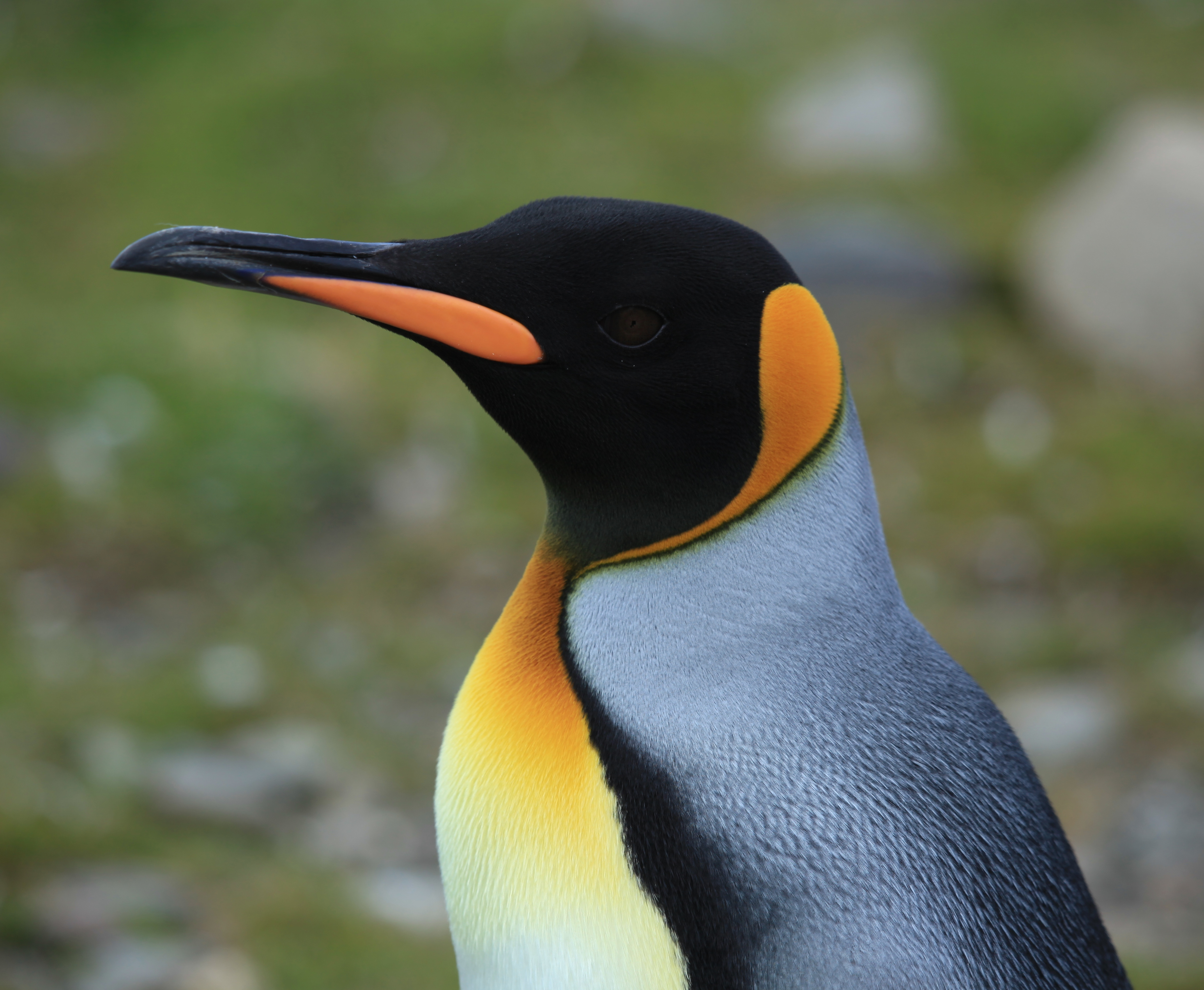
A. p. patagonicus, in South Georgia

== Appearance ==
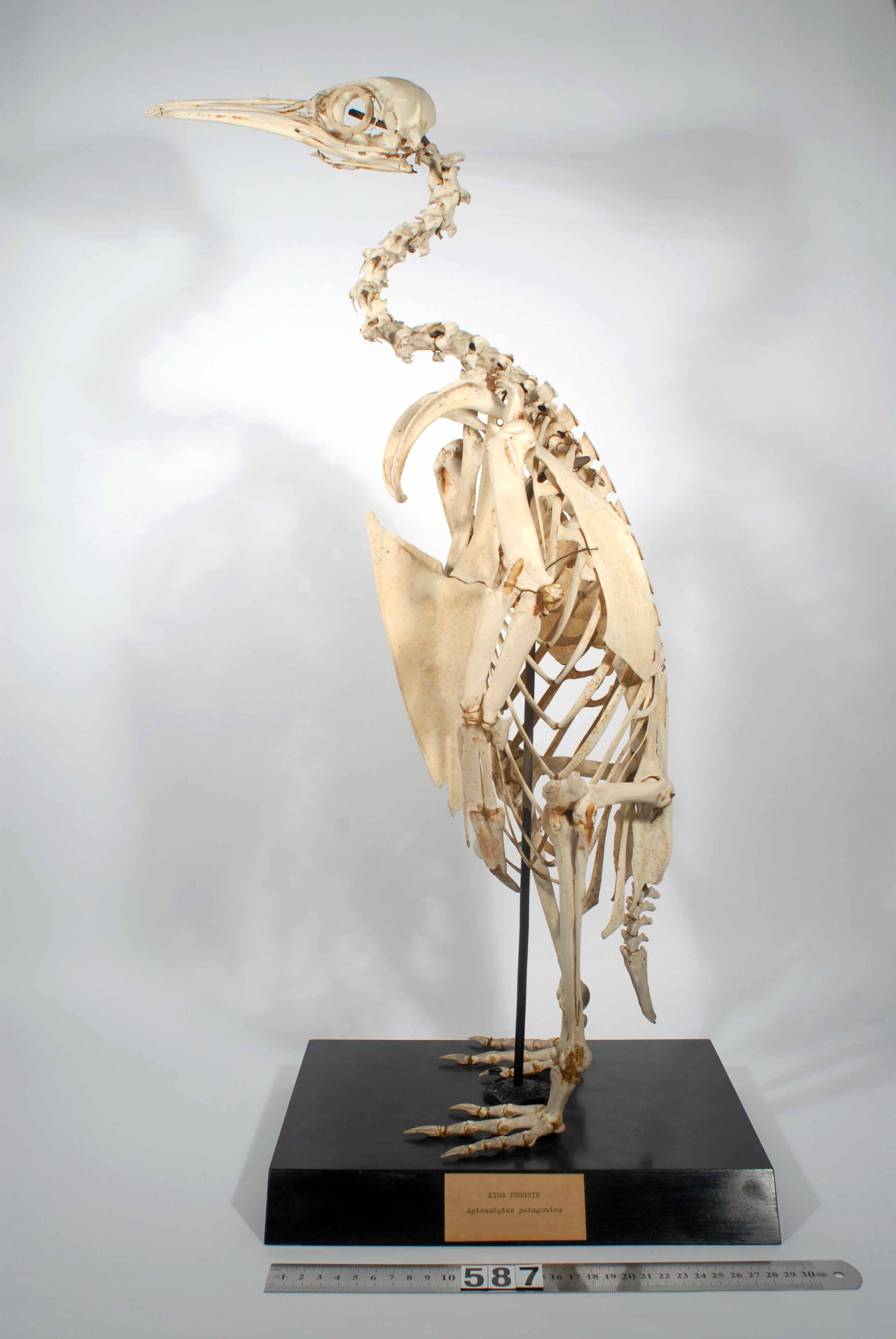
Mounted skeleton

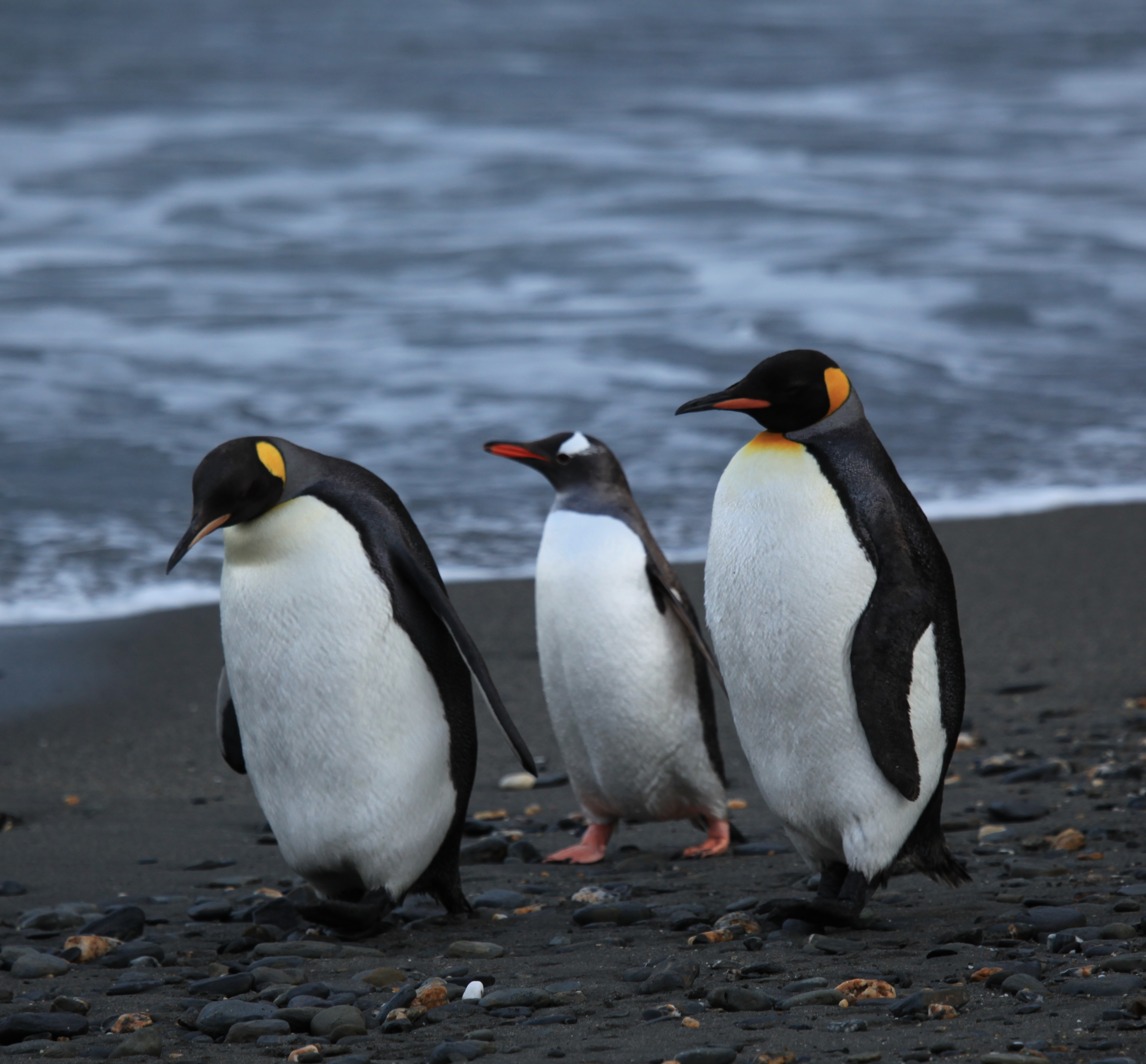
With a gentoo penguin, in South Georgia

The king penguin stands at 70 to 100 cm (28 to 39 in) tall and weighs from 9.3 to 18 kg (21 to 40 lb). Large individuals can weigh up to around 20 kg (44 lb) before molting. Although female and male king penguins look alike, they can be separated by their calls. Males are also slightly larger than females. The mean body mass of adults from Marion Island was 12.4 kg (27 lb) for 70 males and 11.1 kg (24 lb) for 71 females. Another study from Marion Island found that the mean mass of 33 adults feeding chicks was 13.1 kg (29 lb). The king penguin is approximately 25% shorter and weighs around a third less than the emperor penguin.

At first glance, the king penguin appears similar to the larger, closely related emperor penguin, with a broad cheek patch contrasting with surrounding dark feathers and yellow-orange plumage at the top of the chest. However, the cheek patch of the adult king penguin is a solid bright orange whereas that of the emperor penguin is yellow and white, and the upper chest tends to be more orange and less yellowish in the king species. Both have colourful markings along the side of their lower mandible, but these tend towards pink in emperor penguin and orange in king penguin.

Emperor and king penguins typically do not inhabit the same areas in the wild, with the possible exception of vagrants at sea, but the two can be distinguished from one another by the king's longer, straighter bill, larger flippers, and noticeably sleeker body. King penguin chicks with their long bill and heavy dark brown down, are completely different in appearance to the mostly grey emperor penguin chicks with their black and white mask. Once moulted out of their brown downy plumage, juvenile king penguins resemble the adults, but are somewhat less colourful.

The king penguin often breeds on the same large circumpolar islands as other penguin species, but it is easily distinguished from other species by its much larger size and taller frame, colourful markings, and grizzled sooty-greyish rather than blackish back.

== Distribution and habitat ==
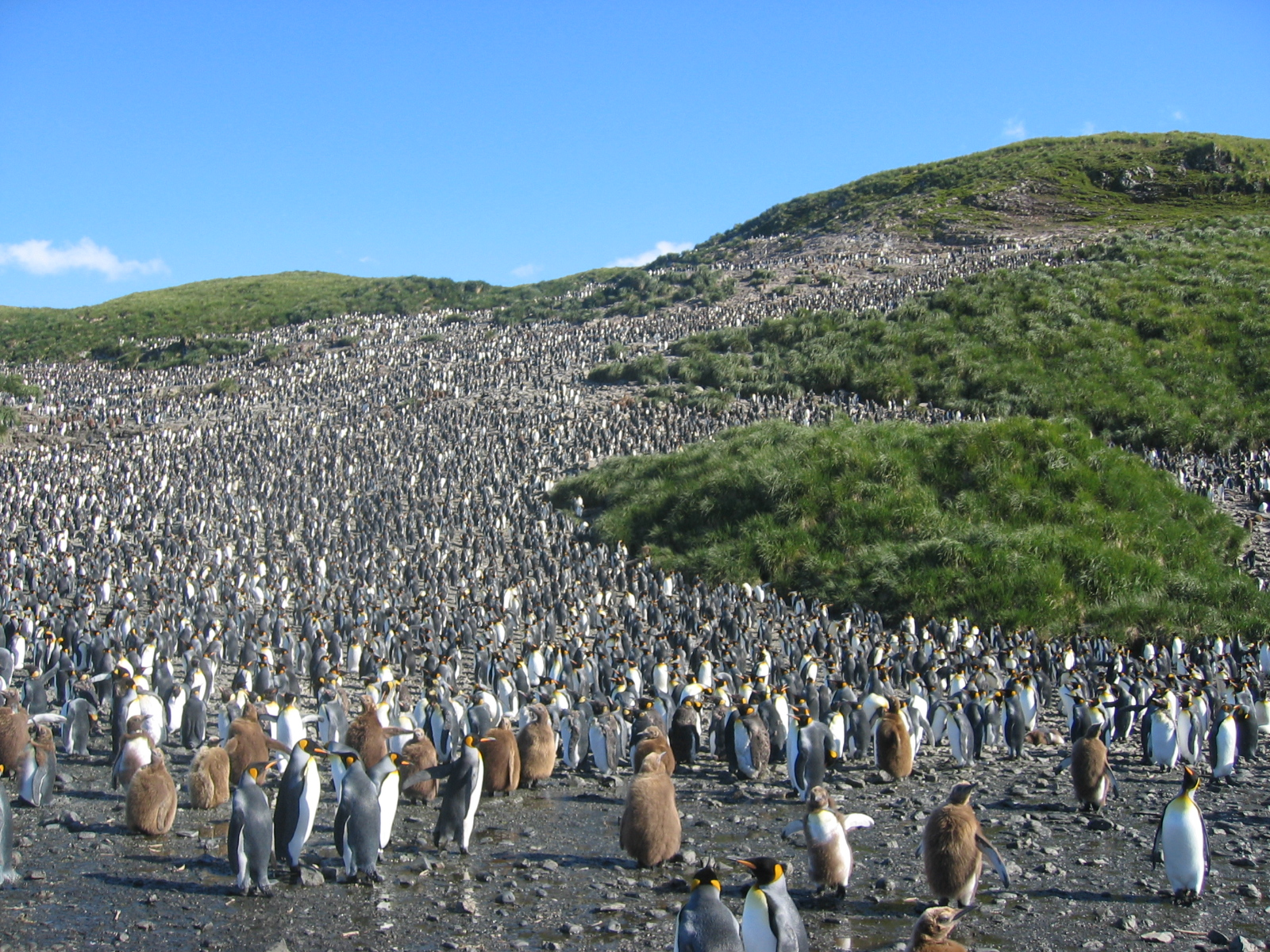
Colony on Salisbury Plain in South Georgia

King penguins breed on subantarctic islands between 45 and 55°S, at the northern reaches of Antarctica, as well as Tierra del Fuego (Argentinian part), the Falkland Islands, and other temperate islands of the region. The total population is estimated to be 2.23 million pairs and is increasing. The largest breeding populations are on the Crozet Islands, with around 455,000 pairs, 228,000 pairs on the Prince Edward Islands, 240,000–280,000 on the Kerguelen Islands, and over 100,000 in the South Georgia archipelago.

By the early 1920s, the king penguin population in South Georgia and the Falklands was nearly wiped out by whalers based on these islands. Constant fires were required to boil whale blubber for extraction of the oil. As the Falklands and South Georgia had no trees to use for firewood, the whalers burned millions of oily, blubber-rich penguins as fuel. The whalers also used penguin oil for lamps, heating and cooking, in addition to eating the birds and their eggs. Macquarie Island currently has around 70,000 pairs. The non-breeding range is unknown; many vagrant birds have been seen on the Antarctic peninsula as well as in South Africa, Australia, and New Zealand.

One of the largest known king penguin colonies, on Île aux Cochons in the Crozet Islands, experienced a massive drop in its population over the last few decades, from about half a million breeding pairs in the 1980s to about 60,000 breeding pairs in 2017. The cause of this decline may be changes in the ecosystem related to climate change as their primary source of food is moving farther away from places where the penguins can breed. This may result in population declines and shifts in the locations of the king penguin breeding grounds.

The Nature Protection Society released several king penguins at Gjesvær in Finnmark and Røst in Lofoten in northern Norway in August 1936. Penguins were seen in the area several times during the 1940s; there were a few unconfirmed sightings of penguins in the area during the early 1950s, but none have been officially recorded since 1949.

== Ecology and behaviour ==
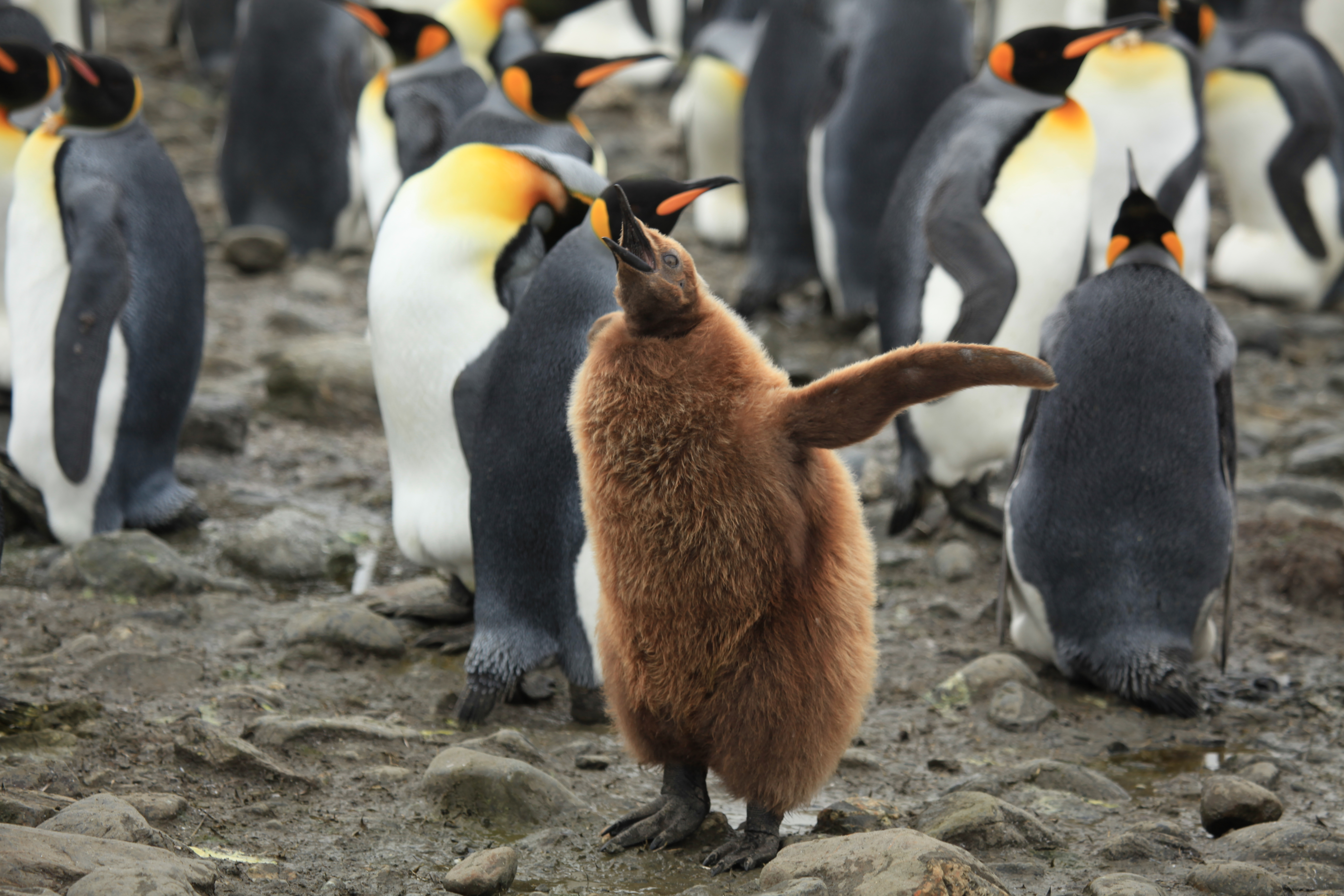
Chick, in South Georgia

American zoologist Gerry Kooyman revolutionised the study of penguin foraging behaviour in 1971 when he published his results from attaching automatic dive-recording devices to emperor penguins, and recording a dive of 235 metres (771 ft) by a king penguin in 1982. The current maximum dive recorded is 343 metres in the Falkland Islands region, and a maximum time submerged of 552 seconds was recorded at the Crozet Islands. The king penguin dives during daylight hours to depths of 100–300 metres (330–980 ft), spending around five minutes submerged, and to less than 30 metres (98 ft) at night.

The majority (around 88% in one study) of dives undertaken by king penguins are flat-bottomed; that is, the penguin dives to a certain depth and remains there for a period of time hunting (roughly 50% of total dive time) before returning to the surface. They have been described as U-shaped or W-shaped, relating to the course of the dive. The remaining 12% of dives have a V-shaped or "spike" pattern, in which the bird dives at an angle through the water column, reaches a certain depth, and then returns to the surface. In contrast, other penguins dive in this latter foraging pattern. Observations at Crozet Islands revealed most king penguins were seen within 30 km (19 mi) of the colony. Using the average swimming speed, Kooyman estimated the distance travelled to foraging areas at 28 km (17 mi).

The king penguin's average swimming speed is 6.5–10 km/h (4.0–6.2 mph). On shallower dives under 60 m (200 ft), it averages 2 km/h (1.2 mph) descending and ascending, while on deeper dives over 150 m (490 ft) deep, it averages 5 km/h (3.1 mph) in both directions. King penguins also "porpoise", a swimming technique used to breathe while maintaining speed. On land, the king penguin alternates between walking with a wobbling gait and tobogganing—sliding over the ice on its belly, propelled by its feet and wing-like flippers. Like all penguins, it is flightless.

King penguins have been shown to detect airborne odors from conspecific feathers and feces, indicating that they can use smell to perceive cues associated with their colonies, although the specific behavioural role of this ability remains unclear.

=== Food ===
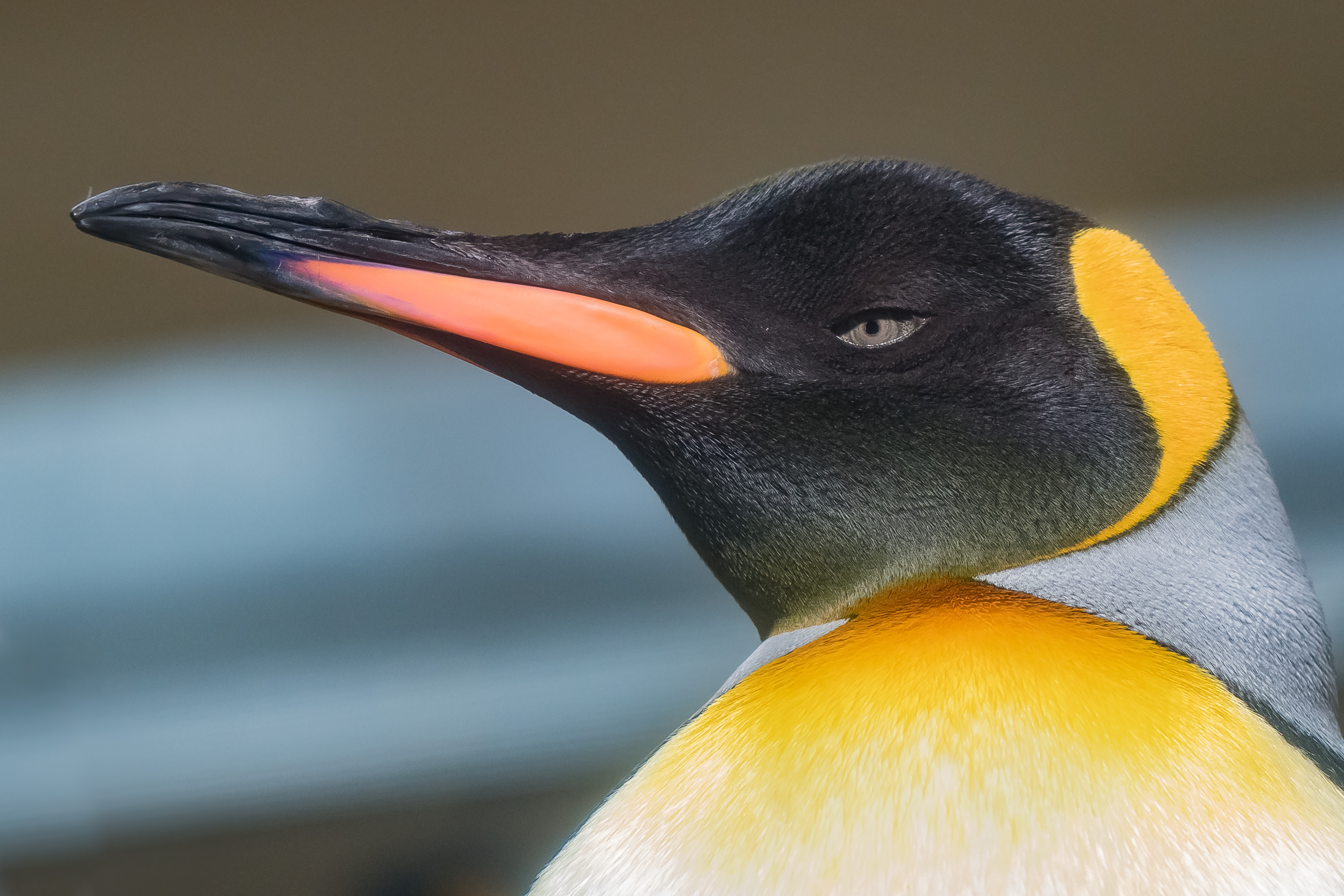
Head closeup, at Tiergarten Schönbrunn, in Vienna

King penguins eat various species of small fish, squid, and krill. Fish constitute roughly 80% of their diet, except in the winter months of July and August, when they make up only around 30%. Lanternfish are the main fish taken, principally the species Electrona carlsbergi and Krefftichthys anderssoni, as well as Protomyctophum tenisoni. Slender escolar (Paradiplospinus gracilis) of the Gempylidae and Champsocephalus gunneri are also consumed. Cephalopods consumed include those of the genus Moroteuthis, the hooked squid (Moroteuthopsis longimana), the sevenstar flying squid (Martialia hyadesii), young Gonatus antarcticus, and Onychoteuthis species.

=== Predators ===
The king penguin's predators include other seabirds and aquatic mammals:

- Giant petrels take many chicks of all sizes and some eggs. They will also occasionally kill adult king penguins, but very likely mostly sick or injured birds. Giant petrels also scavenge adult king penguins and chicks which have died from other causes.
- Skua species (Stercorarius spp.) take eggs and smaller chicks. Some studies may have overstated the effect skua predation has on king penguin colonies, but large numbers of chicks and eggs are taken in areas where skuas nest close to penguin colonies.
- The snowy sheathbill (Chionis alba) and kelp gull (Larus dominicanus) scavenge for unattended eggs and dead chicks.
- The leopard seal (Hydrurga leptonyx) takes adult birds and fledglings at sea.
- Orcas also hunt king penguins.
- Male and especially pre-adult male Antarctic fur seals on Marion Island have also been observed chasing, killing, and eating king penguins on the beach.

=== Courtship and breeding ===
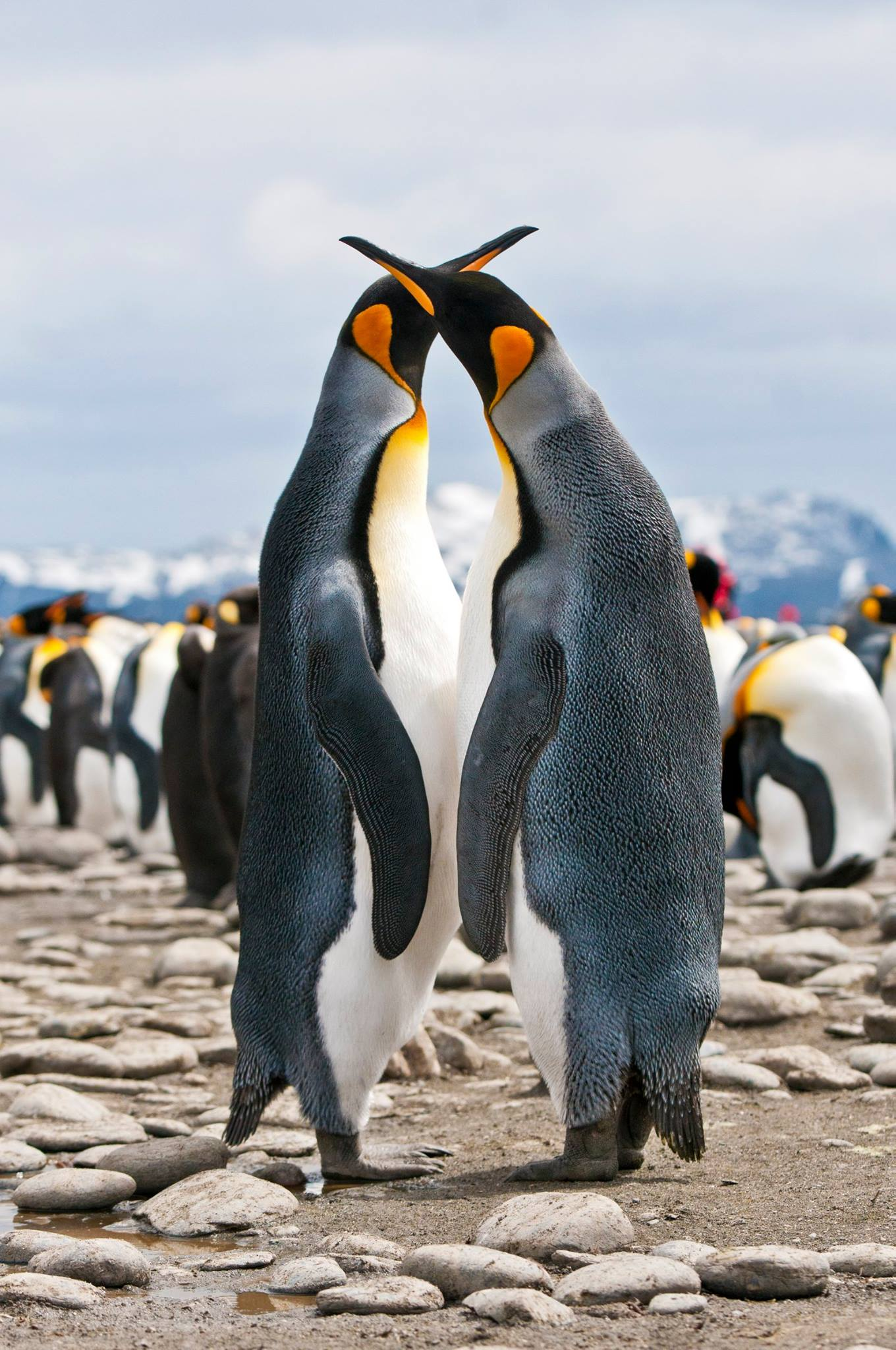
Courtship ritual, on Salisbury Plain, South Georgia.

The king penguin is able to breed at three years of age, although only a very small minority (5% recorded at Crozet Islands) actually do then; the average age of first breeding is around 5–6 years. King penguins are serially monogamous. They have only one mate each year, and stay faithful to that mate. However, fidelity between years is less than 30%. The unusually long breeding cycle probably contributes to this low rate.

The king penguin has a prolonged breeding cycle, taking around 14–16 months from laying to offspring fledging. Although pairs will attempt to breed annually, they are generally only successful one year in two, or two years in three in a triennial pattern in South Georgia. The reproductive cycle begins between September and November, as birds return to colonies for a prenuptial moult. Those that were unsuccessful in breeding the previous season will usually arrive earlier. They then return to the sea for around three weeks before coming ashore in November or December.

The female penguin lays one pyriform (pear-shaped) white egg weighing 300 g (0.66 lb). It is initially soft but hardens and darkens to a pale greenish colour. It measures around 10 cm × 7 cm (3.9 in × 2.8 in). The egg is incubated for around 55 days with both birds sharing incubation in shifts of 6–18 days each. Like the closely related emperor penguin, the king penguin balances the egg on its feet and incubates it in a brood pouch.

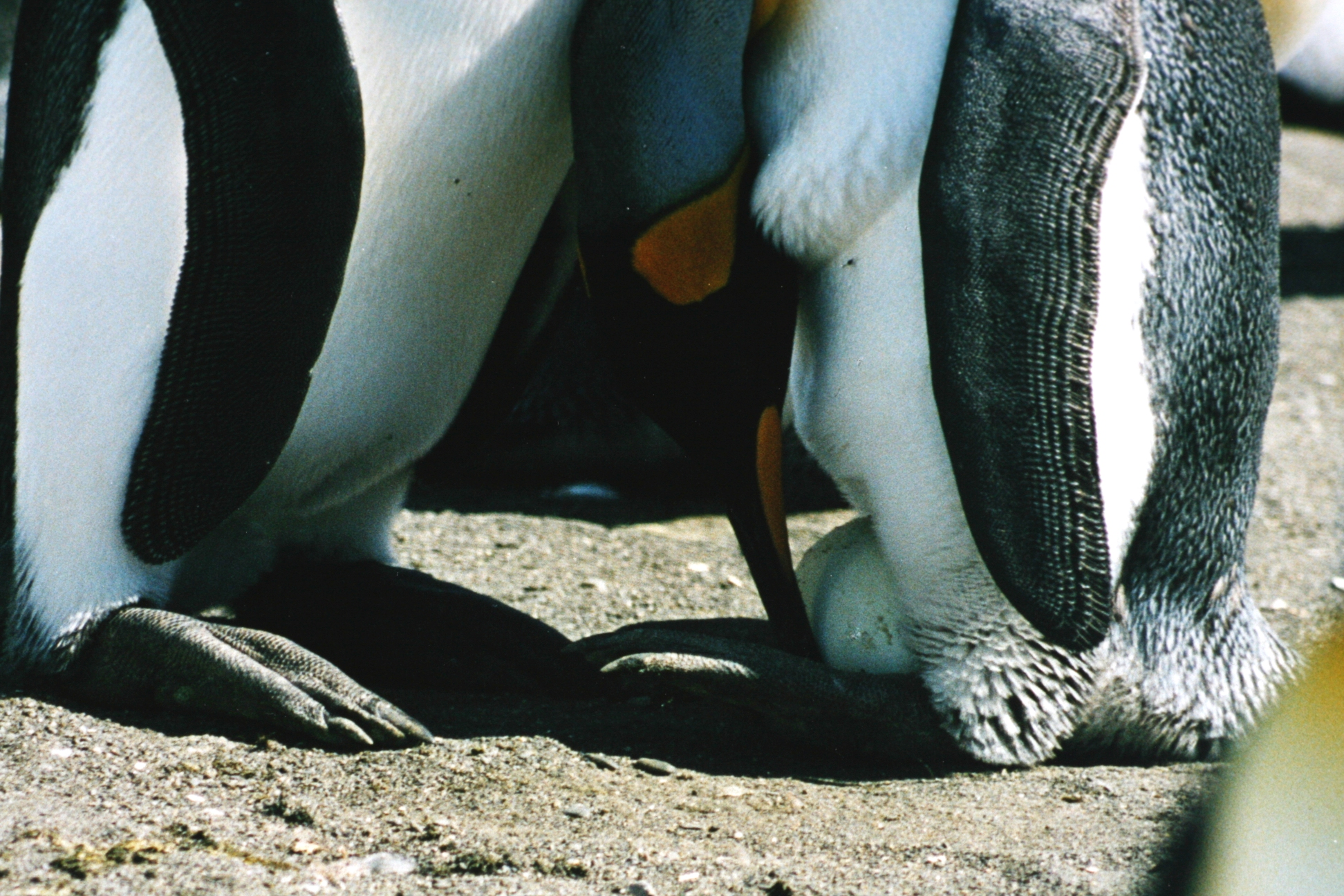
A pair changing the egg guard at South Georgia Island, where over 30 colonies of king penguins reside. An important cause for reproductive failure in some penguin species is mistiming between parents for incubation relief.

Hatching may take up to two to three days to complete and chicks are born semi-altricial and nidicolous: they have only a thin covering of down, and are entirely dependent on their parents for food and warmth. The guard phase begins with the hatching of the chick. Like that of the emperor penguin, the young king penguin chick spends its time balanced on its parents' feet, sheltered in the brood pouch formed from the abdominal skin of the latter. During this time, the parents alternate every 3–7 days, one guarding the chick while the other forages for food. The guard phase lasts for 30–40 days. By then the chick has grown much larger and is better able to both keep warm and protect itself against most predators. King chicks are very curious and will wander far when exploring their surroundings. The chicks form a group called a crèche and are watched over by only a few adult birds; most parents leave their chick in these crèches to forage for themselves and their chick. Other species of penguins also practice this method of communal care for offspring.

By April, the chicks are almost fully grown but lose weight while fasting over the winter months, gaining it again during spring in September. Fledging then takes place in late spring/early summer.

King penguins form huge breeding colonies; for example, the colony on South Georgia Island at Salisbury Plain holds over 30,000 breeding pairs and the colony at St. Andrew's Bay holds over 150,000 pairs. Because of the long breeding cycle, colonies are occupied year-round with both adult birds and chicks. During breeding, king penguins do not build nests, although they show strong territorial behaviour and keep a pecking distance to neighbouring penguins. Penguin positions in breeding colonies are highly stable over weeks and appear regularly spaced.

The king penguin feeds its chicks by eating fish, digesting it slightly, and regurgitating the food into the chick's mouth.

Because of their large size, king penguin chicks take 14–16 months before they are ready to go to sea. This is markedly different from smaller penguins, who rear their chicks through a single summer when food is plentiful. King penguins time their mating so the chicks will develop over the harshest season for fishing. In this way, by the time the young penguins are finally mature enough to leave their parents, it is summer when food is plentiful and conditions are more favourable for the young to survive alone at sea.

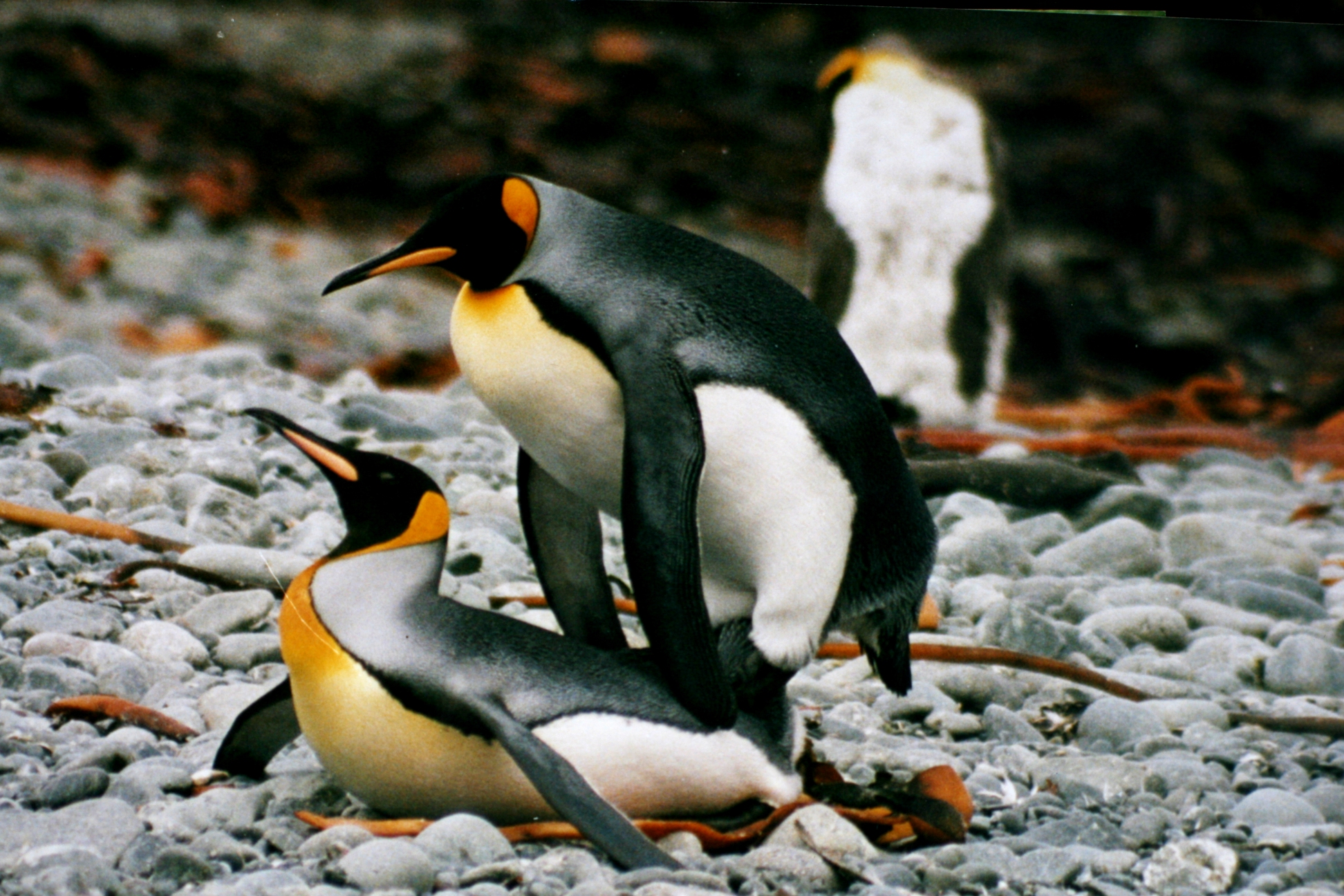
Mating, at Macquarie Island

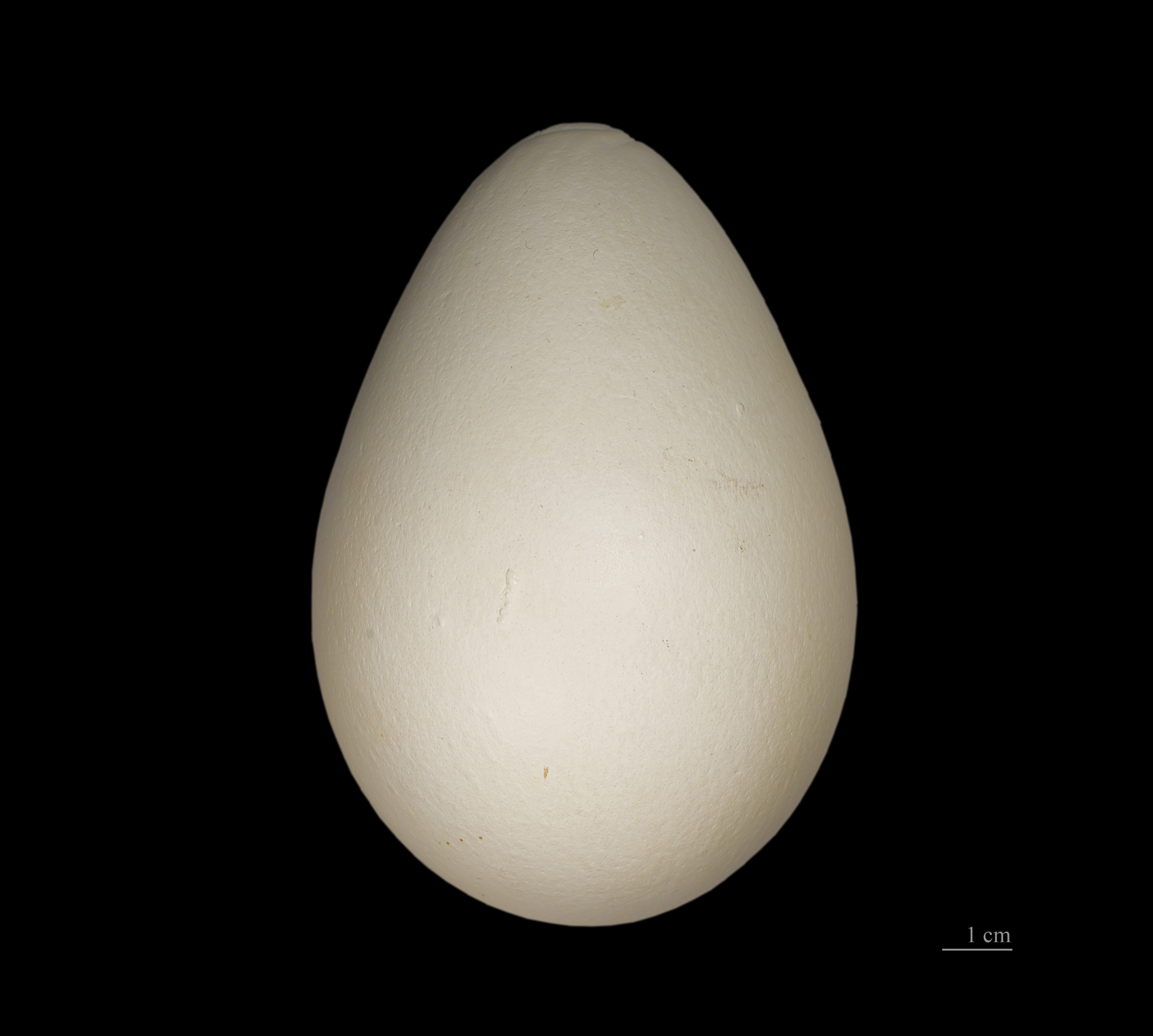
Egg

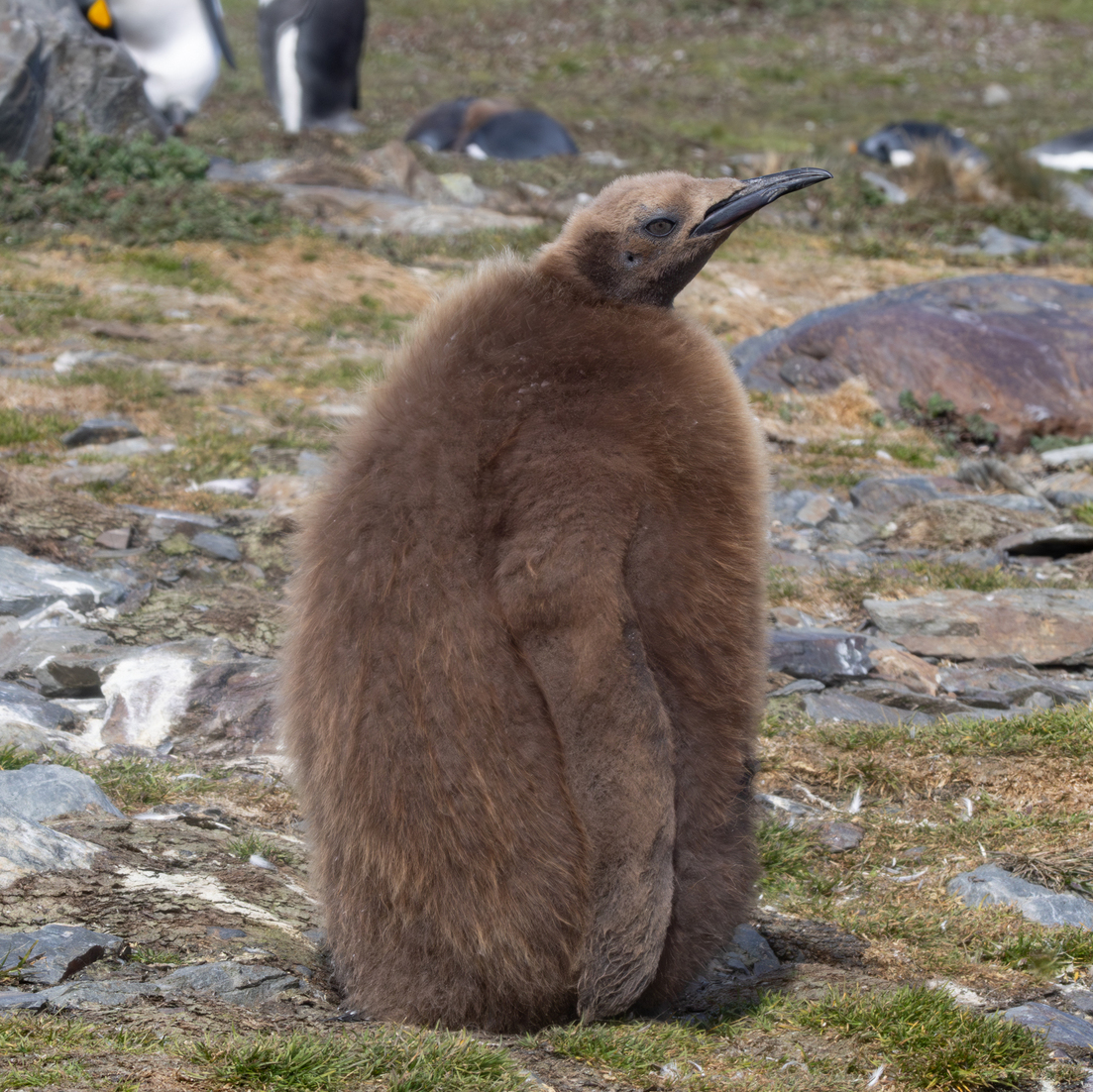
Chick, in South Georgia

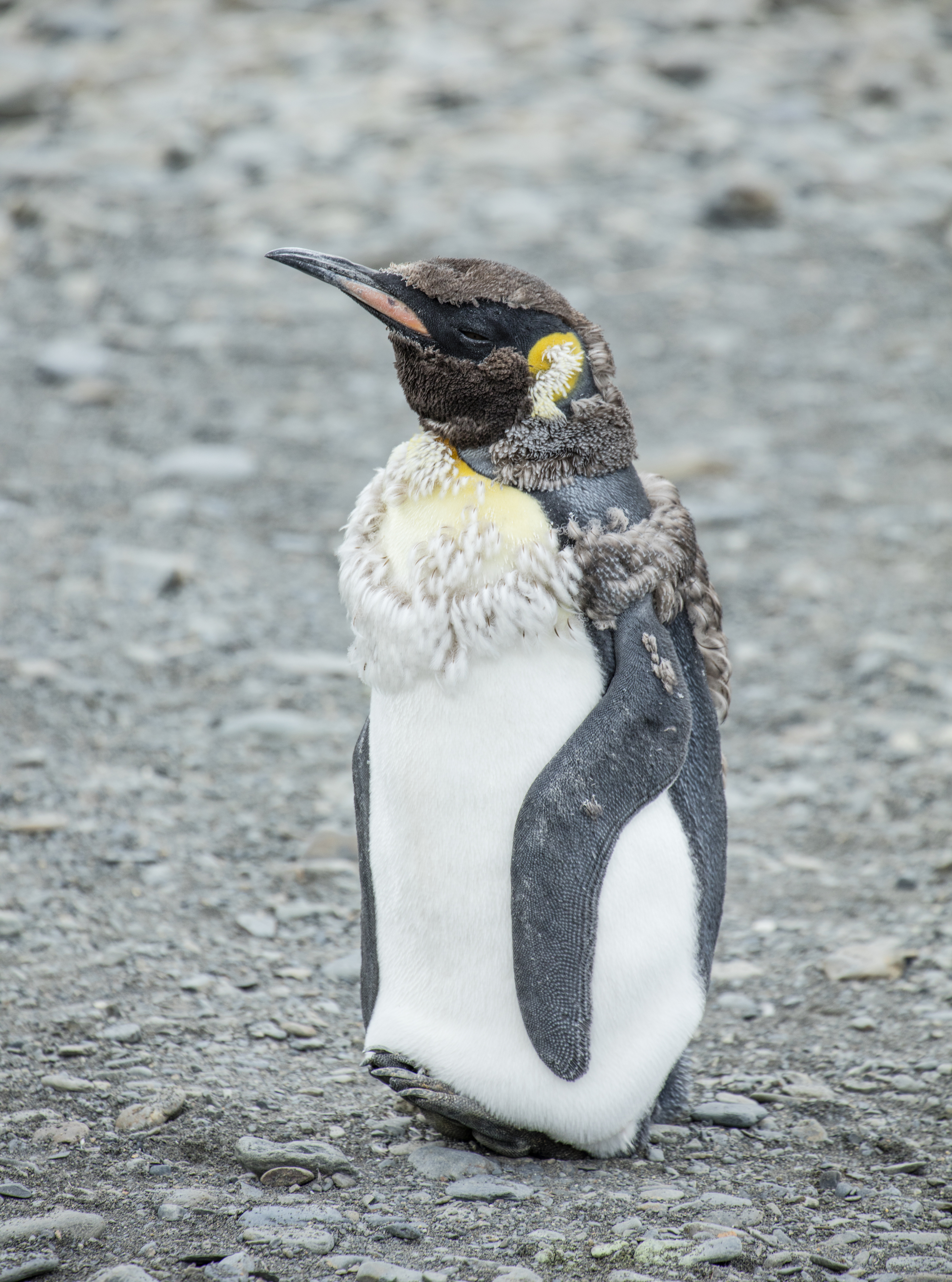
Chick moulting, with pin feathers visible

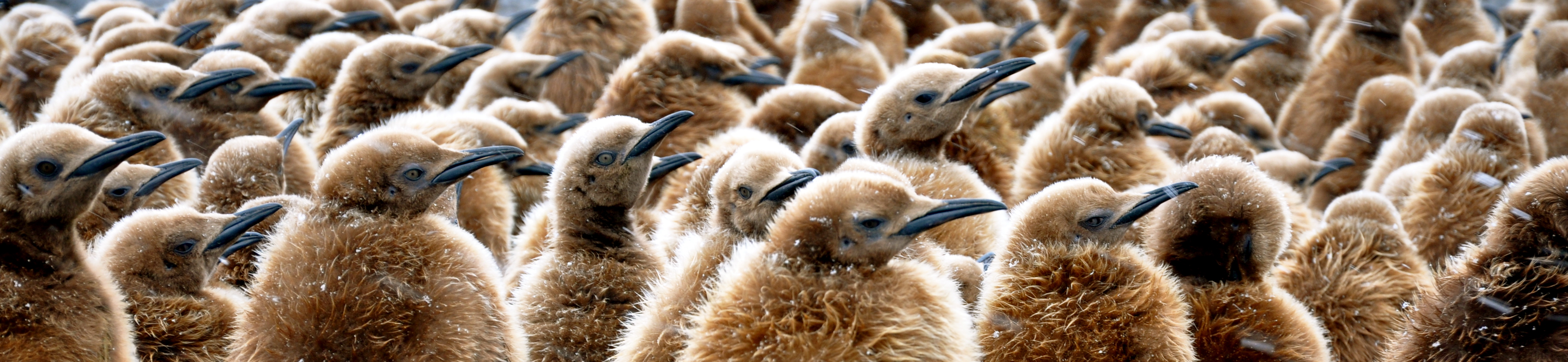
A crèche of chicks at Gold Harbour, South Georgia

== Conservation ==
=== Impact of climate change ===
In less than 80 years, 70% of the king penguin population is expected to disappear. Considered sensitive indicators of changes in marine ecosystems, king penguins serve as a key species for understanding the effects of climate change on the marine biome, especially throughout the sub-Antarctic and Antarctic areas.

King penguins primarily feed at the Antarctic Convergence, which provides 80% of their food biomass. King penguins currently travel 300–500 km (190–310 mi) over the course of over a week to complete the journey. However, ocean warming could easily move these fronts further away from breeding grounds. Continuous ocean warming could cause the convergence zone to move polewards, away from king penguin breeding sites like the Falklands and the Crozet Islands. It has been suggested that if carbon emissions continue to rise at their current rate, king penguins will need to travel an additional 200 km (120 mi) in order to reach their feeding areas. Breeding grounds will also suffer from the rise of emissions. Nearly half of the total population will likely lose their breeding grounds by the year 2100.

King penguins have been shown to adhere to a strict diet, seldom varying their prey despite changing conditions and staying at sea for longer periods to compensate for lower foraging success. As foraging effort cannot increase indefinitely, strict specialists could be particularly vulnerable to prey composition shifts related to climate change.

=== Resource competition ===
King penguins are also threatened by large-scale commercial fishing that could deplete their main source of food: myctophid fish. Over 200,000 tons of myctophid fish were commercially exploited by the beginning of the 1990s in the South Georgia region. Ongoing attempts to further develop this fishery for human consumption close to key penguin foraging areas are likely to have negative impacts on food provisioning.

=== Research and management ===
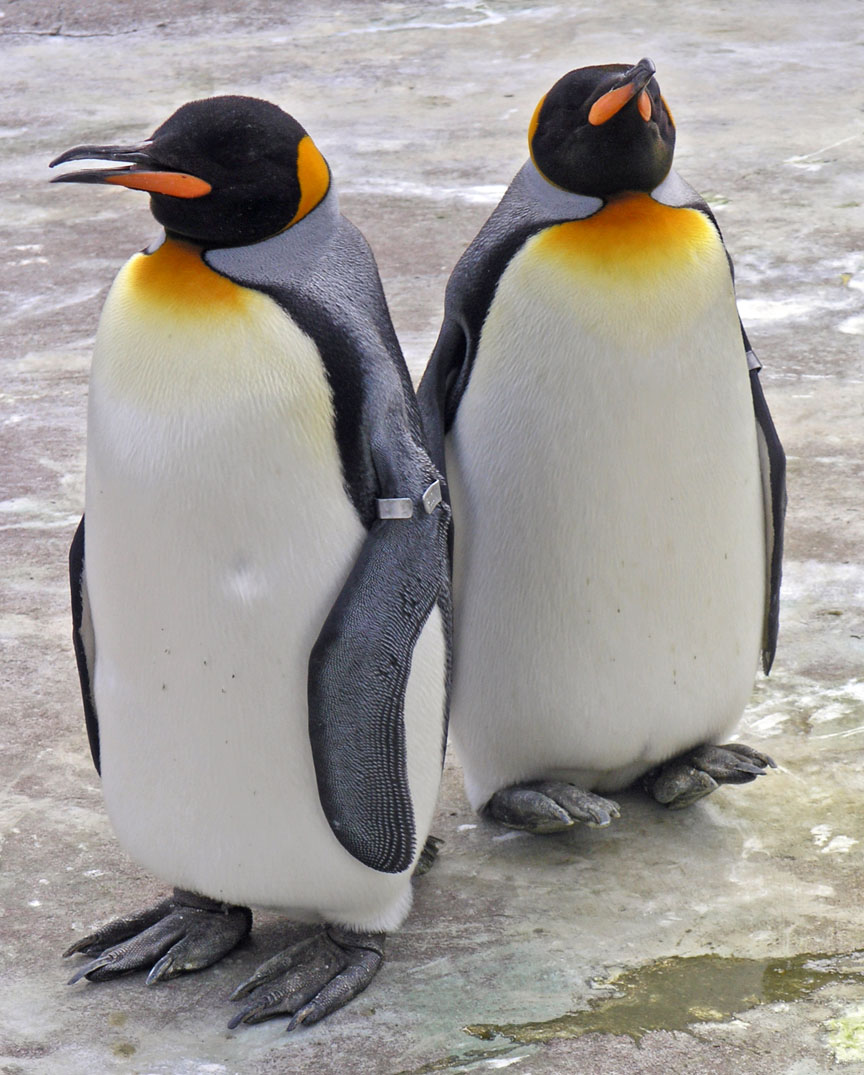
At Edinburgh Zoo, in Scotland

The Pew Charitable Trust recommends the Convention for the Conservation of Antarctic Marine Living Resources (CCAMLR) implement "large-scale, fully protected marine reserves in the waters surrounding Antarctica." The Trust also recommends precautionary management of the Antarctic krill fishery to protect king penguins' main source of food. The CCAMLR is made up of 24 countries (plus the European Union); among those are the United States and China, which have been withholding the authority to enact such protective measures. It has also been suggested that in conservation modeling, special attention be paid to the southernmost breeding locations, given the predicted rise in water temperature in the Southern Ocean, and that complete regular censuses of breeding populations be carried out to detect temporal trends and environmental changes.

The species is classified as Least Concern by the International Union for Conservation of Nature's Red List of Threatened Species. Since 2004, the IUCN has reported that the population size is large and has increased its breeding rates. Adult king penguins have maintained high survival rates since the 1970s. The steady population of king penguins is due largely to current conservation efforts to protect nesting habitats. Ecotourism and public access to all king penguin breeding sites are heavily restricted in order to prevent outbreaks of disease and general disturbance. All of the colonies in Crozet and Kerguelen Islands are protected under the oversight of the Reserve Naturelle Nationales des Terres australes et Antarctiques Françaises. South Georgian penguins reside in a "special protected area within the Environmental Management Plan for South Georgia." And in the Falklands, all wildlife—including the king penguin—is protected under the Conservation of Wildlife and Nature Bill of 1999.

== Relationship with humans ==
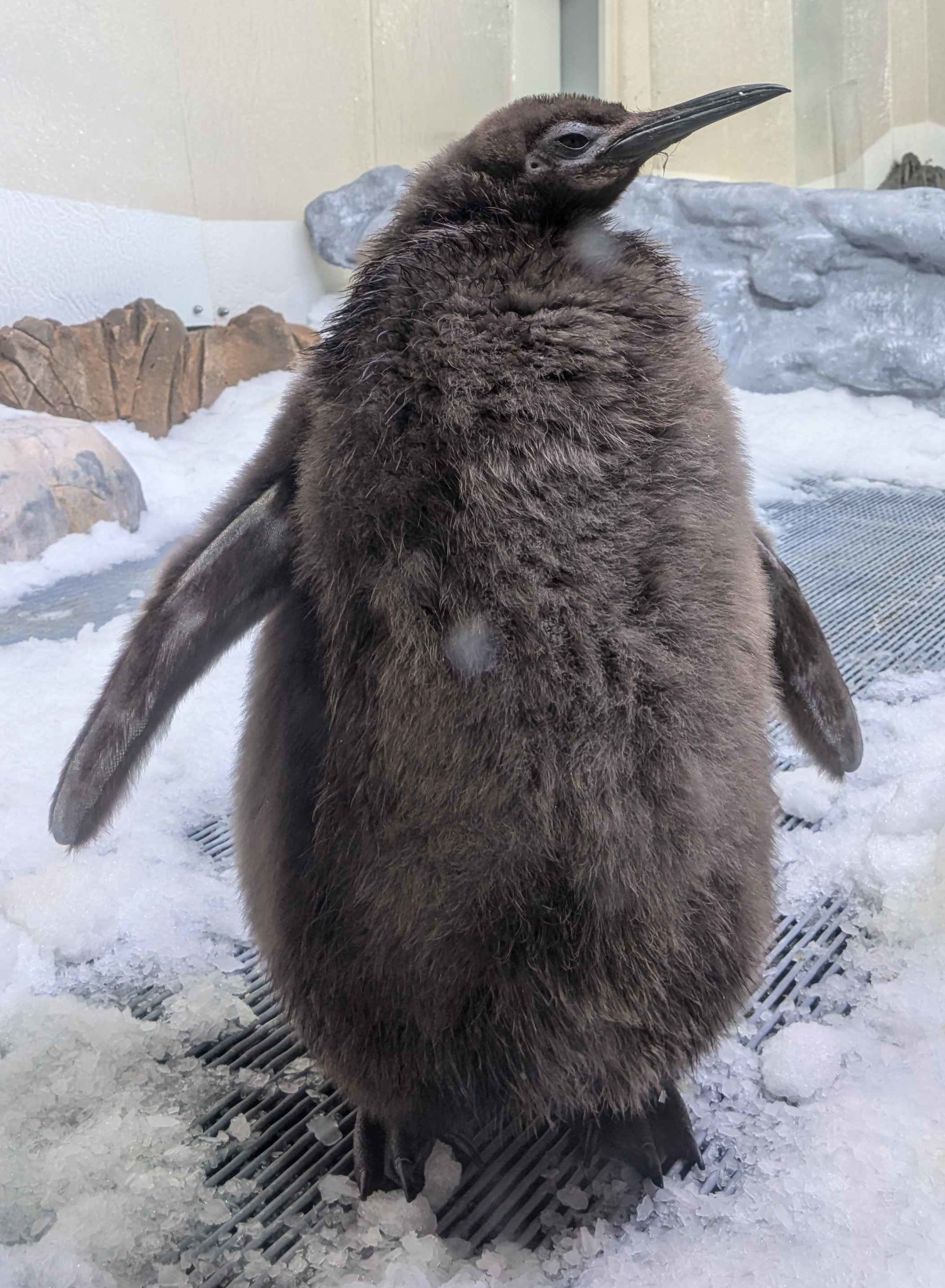
Pesto, a notable king penguin in the Sea Life Melbourne Aquarium

=== In captivity ===
The king penguin is considered a flagship species in zoos and aquaria, and 176 individuals were counted in captivity in North America in 1999. The species is exhibited at SeaWorld Orlando, Indianapolis Zoo, Detroit Zoo, Saint Louis Zoo, Kansas City Zoo, Newport Aquarium in Newport, Kentucky, Edinburgh Zoo and Birdland in the United Kingdom, Berlin Zoological Garden in Germany, Zurich Zoo and Zoo Basel in Switzerland, Diergaarde Blijdorp in the Netherlands, Antwerp Zoo in Belgium, 63 Seaworld in Seoul, South Korea, Melbourne Aquarium in Australia, Mar del Plata Aquarium in Argentina, Loro Parque in Spain and Ski Dubai in United Arab Emirates, Calgary Zoo and the Montreal Biodome in Canada, Odense Zoo in Denmark, Asahiyama Zoo in Hokkaido, Japan, and many other collections.

=== Notable king penguins ===
- Major General Sir Nils Olav was the Edinburgh-based mascot and colonel-in-chief of the Royal Norwegian Guard.
- The king penguin is also the species of penguin represented by the popular character Pondus, an image found on various paraphernalia in many retail stores throughout Canada. Pondus originates in Danish children's books written and photographed by Ivar Myrhøj and published in 1997 by Lademann publisher in the late 1960s. These penguins appeared in the production of Batman Returns.
- Lala the Penguin became a viral video star after an Animal Planet special featured him venturing to a nearby market in Japan to fetch a fish with a specially made backpack. Lala had been accidentally caught by a fisherman. The fisherman and his family nursed Lala back to health and then adopted him as a pet.
- Pesto (hatched 30 January 2024) is a king penguin living in Sea Life Melbourne Aquarium who gained notability in September 2024 due to his exceptionally large size.
