= Bjornstadt Bay =

Bay in South Georgia

Bjornstadt Bay (54°35′S 35°55′W) is a small bay lying 1.5 nautical miles (3 km) northeast of Gold Harbour, along the east coast of South Georgia. The name dates back to at least 1929.
