= Bertrab Glacier =

Glacier in Antarctica

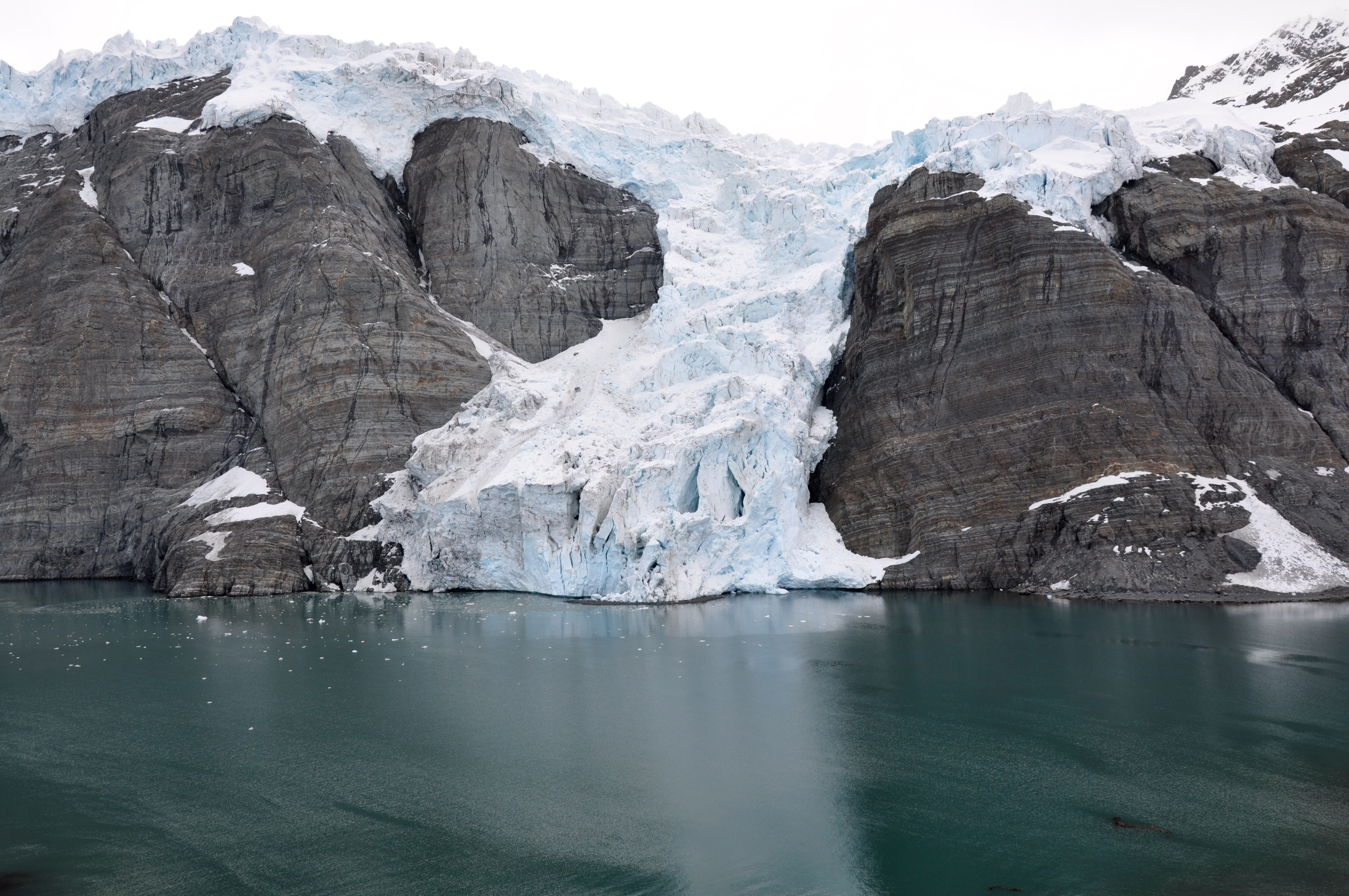
- Bertrab Glacier in summer

- Location within South Georgia Island
- Location: South Georgia
- Coordinates: 54°37′S 35°57′W
- Thickness: unknown
- Terminus: Gold Harbour
- Status: unknown

Bertrab Glacier (54°37′S 35°57′W) is a small glacier at the head of Gold Harbour, at the east end of South Georgia. It was charted by the Second German Antarctic Expedition, 1911–12, under Wilhelm Filchner, and named by him for General von Bertrab, Chief Quartermaster in the German General Staff and Chief of the Land Survey, who was chairman of the expedition.

== See also ==
- List of glaciers in the Antarctic
- Glaciology
