= Gold Head =

Gold Head (54°36′S 35°55′W) is a headland forming the north entrance point of Gold Harbour on the east coast of South Georgia. The name, which derives from Gold Harboor, was proposed by Commander C.J. Gratton, Royal Navy, following his survey of the harbour in 1958.
