= Gold Harbour =

Bay on South Georgia island

- Puerto de Oro (Spanish)
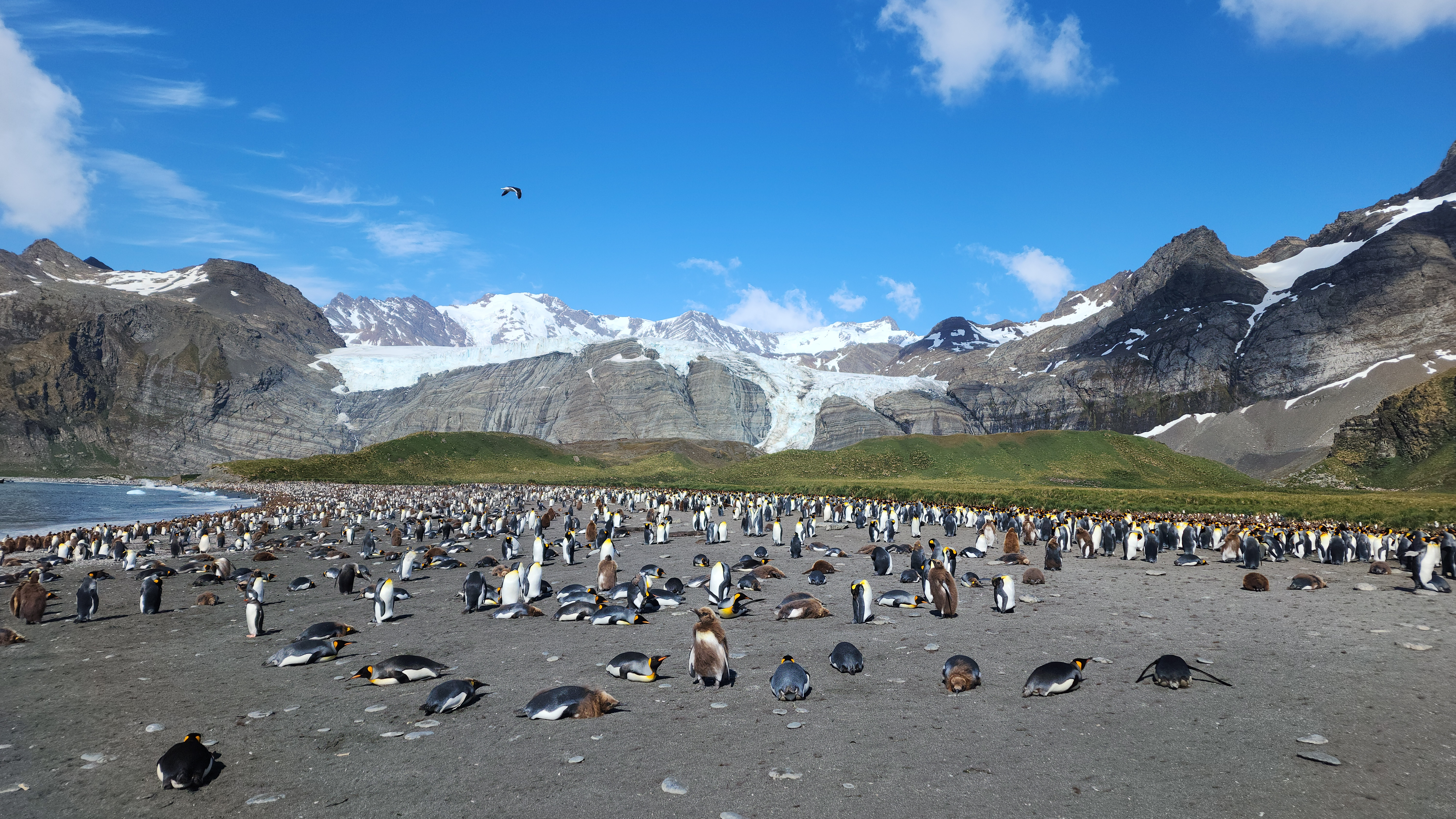
- Gold Harbour in December 2025

- Location within South Georgia Island
- Location: South east coast of South Georgia
- Coordinates: 54°37′33″S 35°56′16″W
- Type: Bay

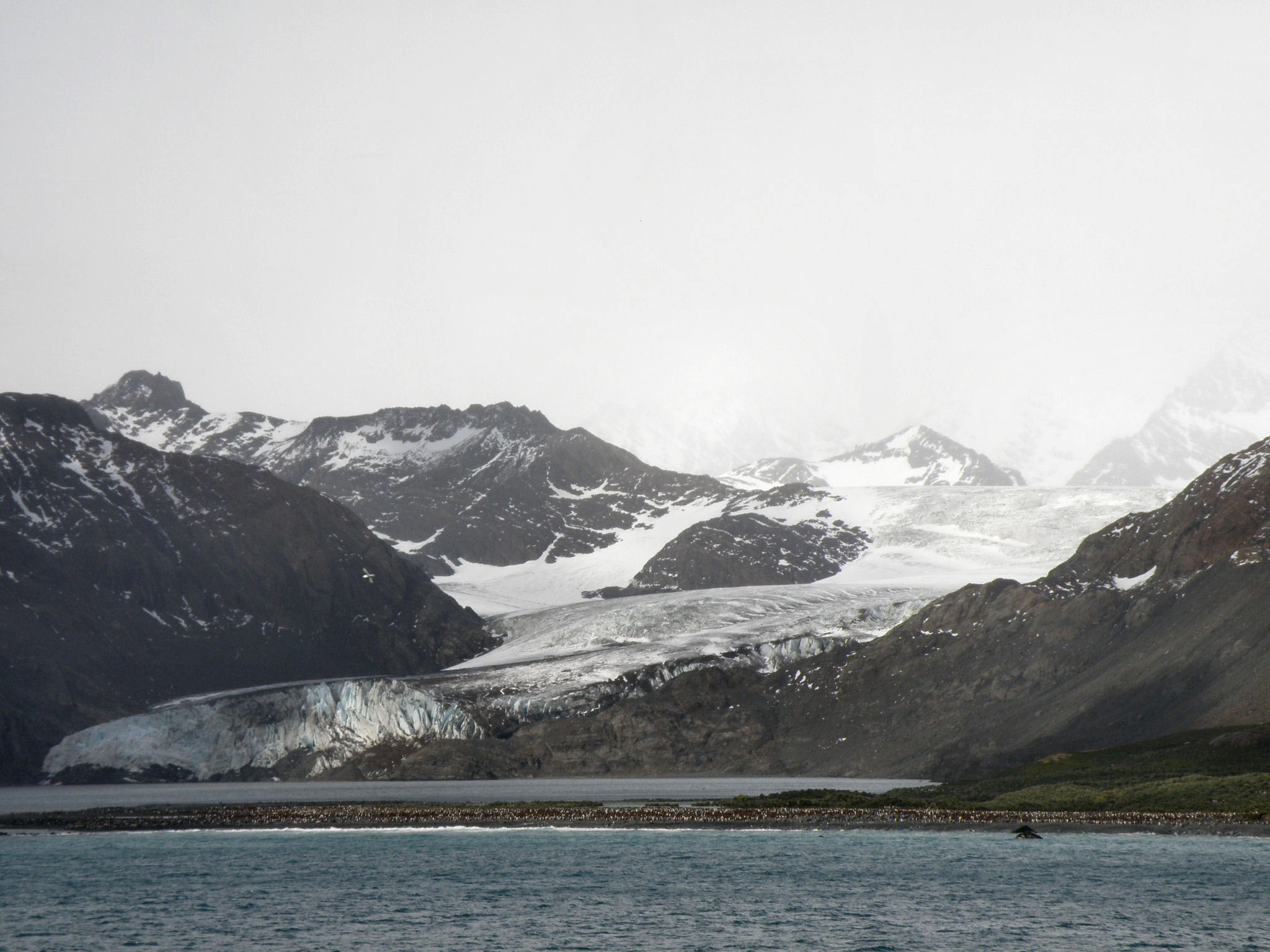
Gold Harbour and Bertrab Glacier

Gold Harbour (Spanish: Puerto de Oro) is a small bay 5 miles (8 km) south-southwest of Cape Charlotte, with Bertrab Glacier at its head, along the east end of South Georgia. During the early 1900s, the feature was variously called "Anna's Bay", "Gold-Hafen" or "Sandwich Bay"; the latter name has also been used for Iris Bay. The approved name appears to have taken root through common usage by sealers and whalers and is now well established.

Gold Harbour is so called because the sun's rays make the cliffs yellow with their light in the morning and evening. There is no particular historical or geological reason to give Gold Harbour its mineral name, which was in common use among the early sealers. Perhaps they were inspired by the sunsets.

== Wildlife ==
The area is a breeding ground for penguins, including King penguins and Gentoo penguins; Southern elephant seals also breed here, especially at the west end of the beach, where a glacial stream flows. Light-mantled albatrosses breed here as well.

== See also ==
- Bjornstadt Bay
- Gold Head
