= The Pondus Penguin =

The Pondus Penguin refers to a character in a Danish children's book, Pondus the Penguin, written and illustrated by Ivar Myrhøj in 1966. The figure is recognized by the red scarf it wears around its neck. Myrhøj published a total of four books about Pondus the Penguin, all issued between 1966 and 1969. Pondus also serves as a mascot for Denmark's largest bank, Danske Bank, where Pondus-shaped piggy banks have been given to children since 1967.

Myrhøj's inspiration for Pondus was a king penguin living in the Copenhagen Zoo. Two bronze statues of Pondus exist in Denmark, one in Copenhagen Zoo, and one on the pedestrian street in Fredericia.

The Pondus penguin mascot featured on several Canadian messenger bags around 2005. The bags can still be found in Canadian dollar stores and bargain bins.
