= Crèche (zoology) =

Group of animals engaged in communal care of offspring

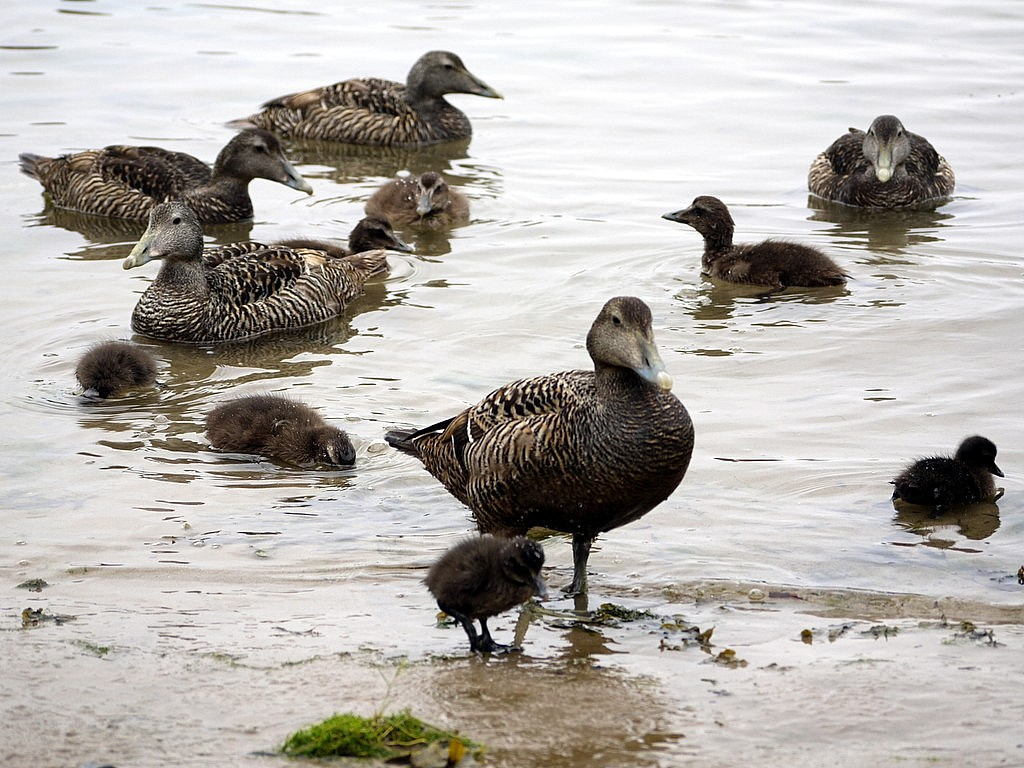
A group of female common eider ducks (Somateria mollissima) with several ducklings

In zoology, a crèche (from a French term for childcare) is an animal behaviour where offspring are cared for as a group by multiple females. Many species such as common eiders, lions, and penguins form crèches and exhibit group behaviours.

Crèches can serve different functions and purposes depending on the species and the environment. For example, some crèches may aid in defence while other crèches may aid in feeding and protection from harsh weather conditions. This form of group living has evolved to become advantageous to the species. Studies have shown that by participating in group living, species will increase their inclusive fitness since their young will be in a better condition to reproduce and carry on the line of descendants in the species.

== Behaviour in eider ducks ==
In the common eider population, after laying their eggs, the mother will incubate them until they hatch. The mothers will hear a signal from the juveniles that will cause her to move away and open the nest for the eggs to hatch safely. Once the eggs have hatched, the mother will either abandon her young, care for her young alone or join a multi-female crèche. In the common eider species, if the crèche group behaviour is followed, the formation of the crèche will occur as soon as the juveniles leave the nest, and the group behaviour will last for a long period as the mother provides parental care to her young as they develop. Studies have shown that while the parental care mode can change over the years, 46% of female eiders will care for their young through a multi-crèched environment. Female eiders can care for their young through a true crèche or a transient crèche. In a true crèche, the mother will choose a select group of females to live and care for her young with for a long period of time. Contrastingly, in a transient crèche, the female and her young will not stay with the same group for a long duration and they will move through different crèches rather than stay with one permanent group. These transient crèches will normally form about two weeks after the juveniles hatch so they have time to experience social interaction with their mother and siblings first. The females and young in the true crèches showed a higher level of overall condition compared to the transient crèches. Another study provided evidence that common eiders who do not join a crèche will maintain the best condition throughout development compared to those who did.

== Behaviour in lions ==
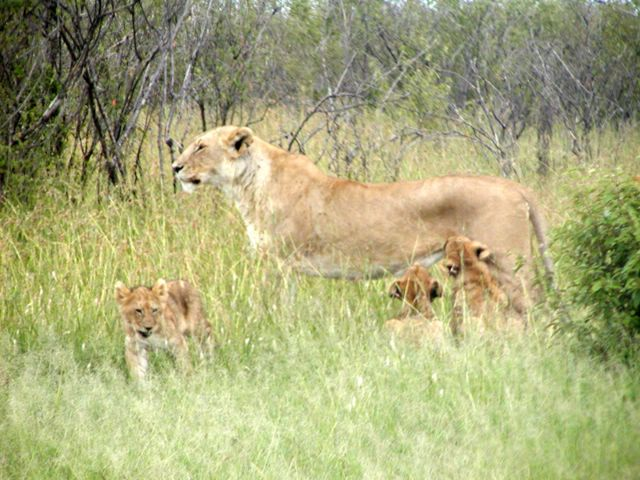
Lion cubs feeding from mother

Crèche behaviours will also develop in certain species of lions. For the first four to six weeks of development, mothers will care for their young on their own to make sure they are getting the proper care and nutrition. Once they reach six weeks, female pride mate mothers will group to form a crèche. Mothers will form this crèche with other mothers who have cubs of the same age. These crèches could range from two to nine mothers, but they average around four to five mothers. Females and their young will remain together in these crèches until the young have reached about two years of age. Studies show that mothers in crèches which involve three to four females may suffer from low food intake. The main advantage of crèches in lion species is for defence. The mothers in a crèche will work together to defend their cubs and protect them from nomadic male lions or any other predators that may approach the pride. The greater number of females in the crèche, the greater rates of male takeovers. Being a member of a crèche provides safety from predators for the cubs and ensures that the mother will forage in a group size close to optimum. Studies have proven that mothers keep their cubs in crèche formations to initiate highly stable care groups that will aid in defence. While crèches are great for defence, they have a contrasting impact on food intake. If there are a very high number of cubs in a crèche compared to mothers, the cubs could become severely undernourished. As well, female lions without cubs will avoid a crèche as they would experience a low rate of food intake in that group living arrangement. Studies have also shown that living in a crèche environment does not guarantee increased access and retrieval of resources. When lions are nursing, the cubs that are raised in a crèche do not have an advantage of gaining more milk than their conspecifics who do not live in a crèche.

== Crèche behaviour in penguins ==
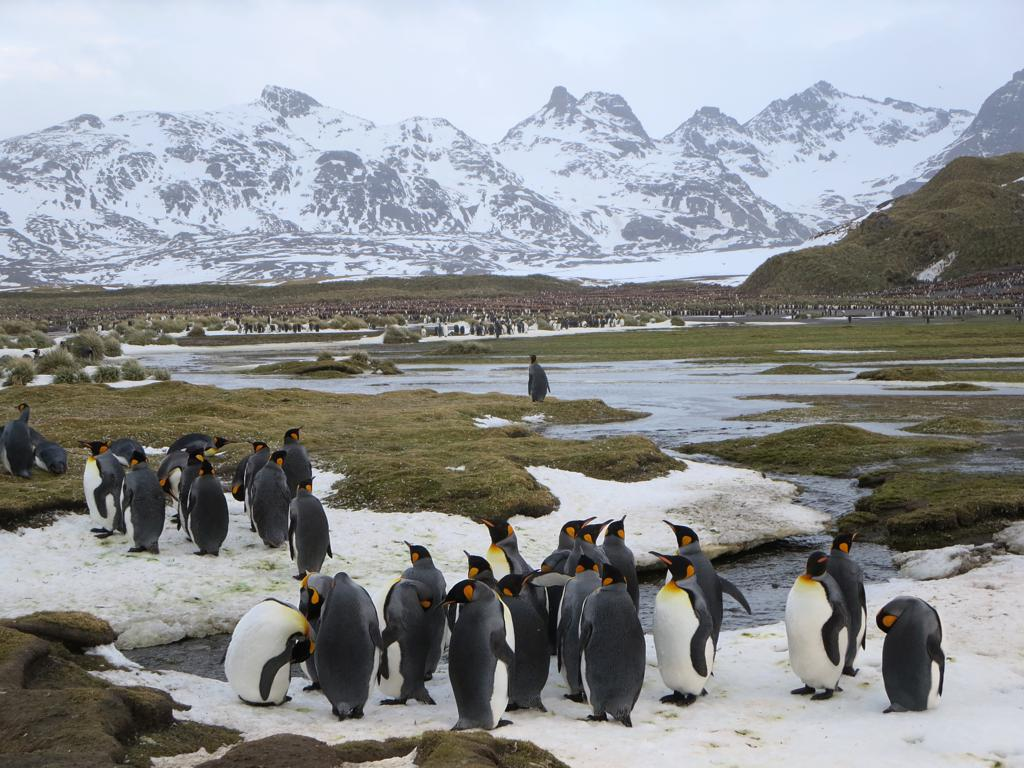
King penguin colony found in the Antarctic

The crèche group behaviour will also be seen in many species of penguins. This behaviour will occur when multiple adult penguins rear their chicks together in a group formation. In the majority of penguin crèches there will be more chicks than adults. The main advantage of the crèche formation in penguins is to aid in thermoregulation but the formation also helps prevent predation and aggression. While living in a crèche the penguin chicks will be reared in the presence of multiple adults and therefore will be protected from aggressive adults or predators. The largest crèche formations are seen when weather conditions are harsh. These harsh conditions normally include very low temperatures and high humidity, wind speeds and cloud cover. During these times in particular, there will be increased contact between adults and chicks as they gather together to provide warmth to one another to aid in thermoregulation.
