= Pesto (disambiguation) =

Pesto is a type of sauce in Italian cuisine.

Pesto may also refer to:

- Pesto (see), a former bishopric and present Latin Catholic titular see on the Ancient site of Paestum in Italy
- Pesto (penguin), king penguin who gained popularity for being exceptionally large
- Robert Peston, BBC financial journalist, informally known as "Pesto"
- Pesto, a 1999 EP by Less Than Jake
- Pesto, a character on the animated TV series Animaniacs
- Pesto family, characters on the animated TV series Bob's Burgers

== See also ==
- Pistou, a type of sauce in Provencal cuisine
