= Hua Hua (giant panda) =

Chinese giant panda (born 2020)

- Species: Giant panda
- Sex: Female
- Born: He Hua; July 4, 2020 (age 6); Chengdu Research Base of Giant Panda Breeding, Sichuan, China
- Occupation: Honorary Director of Chengdu Culture and Tourism Bureau
- Parents: Mei Lan (father); Cheng Gong (mother)

He Hua (Chinese: 和花; pinyin: Héhuā; born July 4, 2020), most commonly known as Hua Hua (Chinese: 花花; pinyin: Huāhuā) is a female giant panda residing at the Chengdu Research Base of Giant Panda Breeding in Chengdu, Sichuan. She is considered one of China's "celebrity pandas", with her gaining popularity online due to her distinct appearance and gentle personality.

== Appearance ==
Hua Hua is a rotund panda with upside-down teardrop-shaped eye circles, a short jaw, a sharp muzzle which is likened to that of a fox, and snow-white fur that is notably more fluffy compared to other pandas.

She has short legs which she allegedly inherited from great-grandfather Zhen Zhen (Zhen Zhen is the father of Yang Yang, who is the father of Mei Lan; Zhen Zhen also has a daughter, Dan Dan, who is known for her short legs), and has overpronated right hind paw which hinders her speed and ability to climb trees. She also has two rows of teeth which she inherited from her father Mei Lan, which weakens her jaw strength and hinders her eating.

== Life ==
Hua Hua and her twin sister He Ye were born on 4 July 2020, to parents Cheng Gong and Mei Lan. Due to their mother's age (having given birth at 20 years old, which is equivalent to 80 in human years), the two cubs were fostered by other pandas alongside their own cubs. She currently resides at the Chengdu Panda Base.

Hua Hua was initially the larger and stronger twin, weighing 200 grams at birth (while her sister He Ye weighed 167 grams) and was the second-heaviest panda cub among the 2020 batch of newborn cubs. However, due to her short legs, combined with her double-rowed teeth which hinders her eating and in turn impedes her growth rate, Hua Hua hence looks significantly smaller than other pandas her age. While she does struggle to climb trees, she has succeeded several times, though she climbs very slowly and occasionally displays trouble in climbing down.

== Popularity ==
Hua Hua gained popularity amongst netizens for her unique appearance and gentle personality. Her chubby appearance which people have compared to that of an onigiri, her "ability" to understand Sichuan slang, as well as her tendency to allow other pandas in the base to steal her food, has sparked sympathy and interest among internet users. On the blogging platform Weibo, Hua Hua's hashtag has garnered nearly 1.6 billion engagements, a dedicated "super discussion" group about her on Chinese social media has 670,000 members, and individual videos about her on TikTok have garnered 2.6 million views. She has become known as one of China's "celebrity pandas", being featured as a "guest" for the 2024 Spring Festival Gala, and even being given the honorary position of Director of Chengdu Culture and Tourism Bureau.

Hua Hua's popularity has caused increased amounts of tourism to the Chengdu Panda Base, with tourists lining up half an hour before the base opens and waiting for hours simply to get a glimpse of her in her exhibit. The resulting "panda mania" has caused hotel bookings nearby to increase 3.2 times compared to the previous year, as well as increasing popularity of panda-related souvenirs such as panda dolls, headbands, and backpacks. Hua Hua has proven to be so popular among internet users and tourists that the Chengdu Panda base was forced to restrict visitor entry due to the sheer amount of visitors.

== See also ==
- List of individual giant pandas
- List of individual bears
- Moo Deng, a baby pygmy hippopotamus that gained online popularity in September 2024
- Pesto, a baby penguin that gained online popularity in September 2024
