= Sea Life Melbourne Aquarium =

Aquarium in Melbourne, Australia

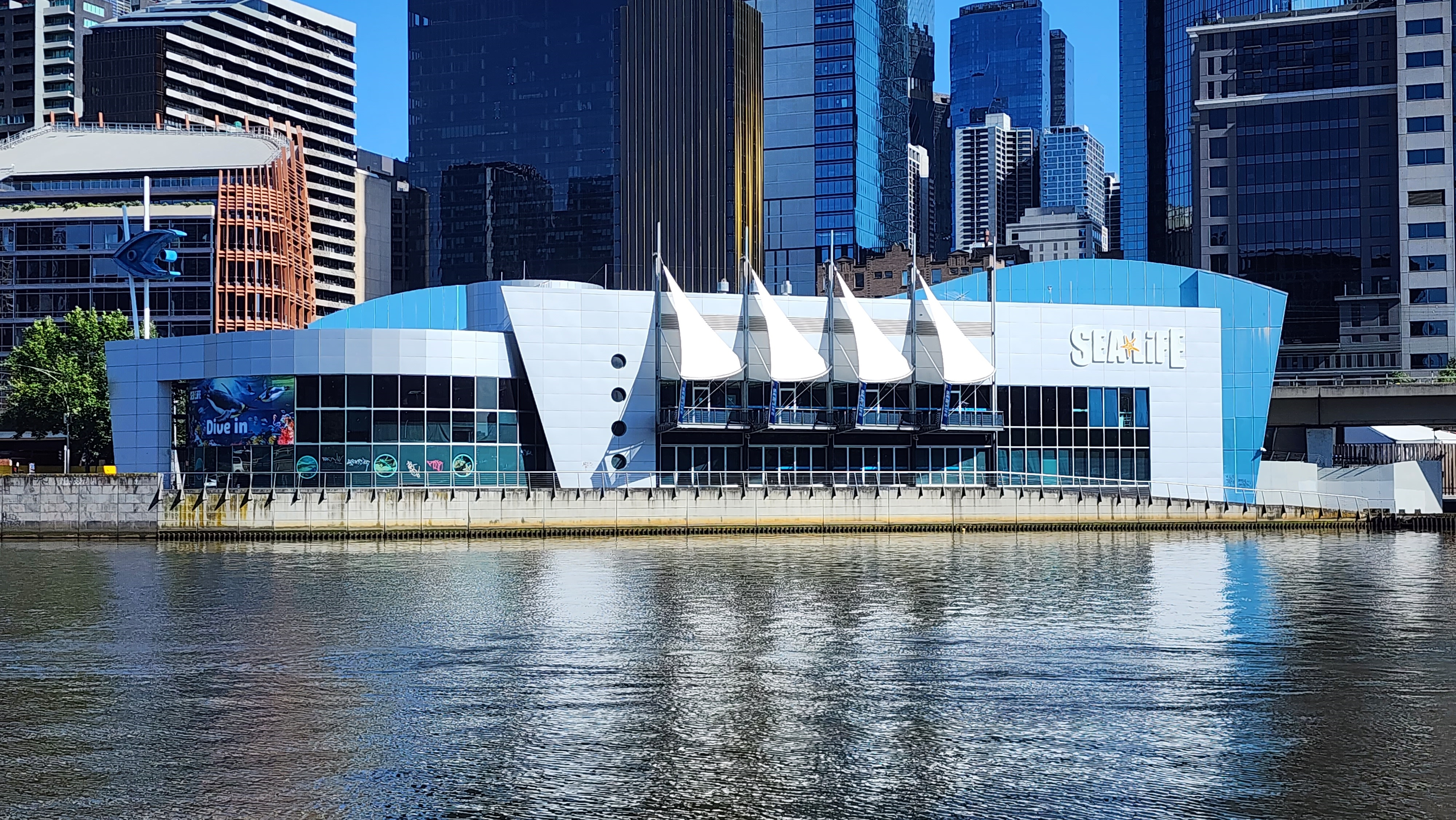
- the Sea Life Melbourne Aquarium seen from the Yarra River in February 2018
- Interactive map of Sea Life Melbourne Aquarium
- 37.821044°S 144.958017°E
- Date opened: 17 January 2000; 26 years ago
- Location: Melbourne CBD, Melbourne, Victoria, Australia
- No. of animals: 10,000+
- No. of species: 550+
- Volume of largest tank: 2,200,000 litres (480,000 imp gal; 580,000 US gal)
- Annual visitors: Over 1 million
- Major exhibits: Penguin Playground, Ocean Invaders, Bay of Rays, Discovery Rockpools, Crocodile Lair, Coral Atoll, Shipwreck Explorer, Seahorse Pier, Rainforest Adventure
- Public transit: Melbourne Aquarium/Flinders St (#2): 35, 70, 75
- Website: www.visitsealife.com/melbourne

Sea Life Melbourne Aquarium is a Southern Ocean and Antarctic aquarium in central Melbourne, Australia. It is located on the banks of the Yarra River beside and under the Flinders Street Viaduct and the King Street Bridge. The attraction is a Sea Life Centre owned by Merlin Entertainments.

== History ==
The current building was built between February 1998 and December 1999, the building was designed by Peddle Thorp architects to resemble a ship moored to the river, and opened on 17 January 2000. The depth of the building however was designed not to be imposing at street level, and extends 7 metres (23 ft) below the surface. At its centre is a world first 2,200,000-litre (580,000 US gal) 'oceanarium in the round' where the spectators become the spectacle to the marine life swimming around them.

Soon after opening, the building had a legionnaires disease outbreak that resulted in 4 deaths and another 125 people being infected. Those affected had visited the aquarium between 11 and 27 April 2000. A damages action was brought in May 2000, ending in February 2004.

On 28 November 2008 Melbourne Aquarium officially reopened after a significant expansion, also designed by Peddle Thorp, and now extends from the Yarra River to Flinders Street. A new entrance was built on the corner of Flinders and King Streets. The expansion features exhibits with king penguins and gentoo penguins, as well as many Antarctic fish, a first for Australia. The exhibits also feature real ice and snow to simulate Antarctic conditions, and take visitors on an expedition to Antarctica. The penguins were sourced from Kelly Tarlton's Underwater World in New Zealand.

In April 2013, Melbourne Aquarium's owners, Merlin Entertainments, announced that they would be spending $8 million on the refurbishment of the facilities. As part of the process, the aquarium was rebranded as a Sea Life Centre and relaunched in September 2013.

The current Aquarium succeeded an earlier site in the Eastern annex of the Royal Exhibition Building, which burned down in 1953.

== Features ==
The Aquarium has a one-way self-guided tour, which is spread over four levels:

=== Level One ===
- Rainforest Adventure
- Crocodile's Lair
- Wetlands Recovery Nursery

=== Ground Floor ===
- Penguin Playground
- Mangroves and Rockpools
- Coral Atoll
- The Bay
- Seahorse Pier
- Coral Cafe
- Conservation Cove
- Crocodile's Lair
- Aquarium Shop

=== Level B1 ===
- Ocean Invaders

=== Level B2 ===
- Mermaid Garden
- Shipwreck Explorer
- Ocean Discovery

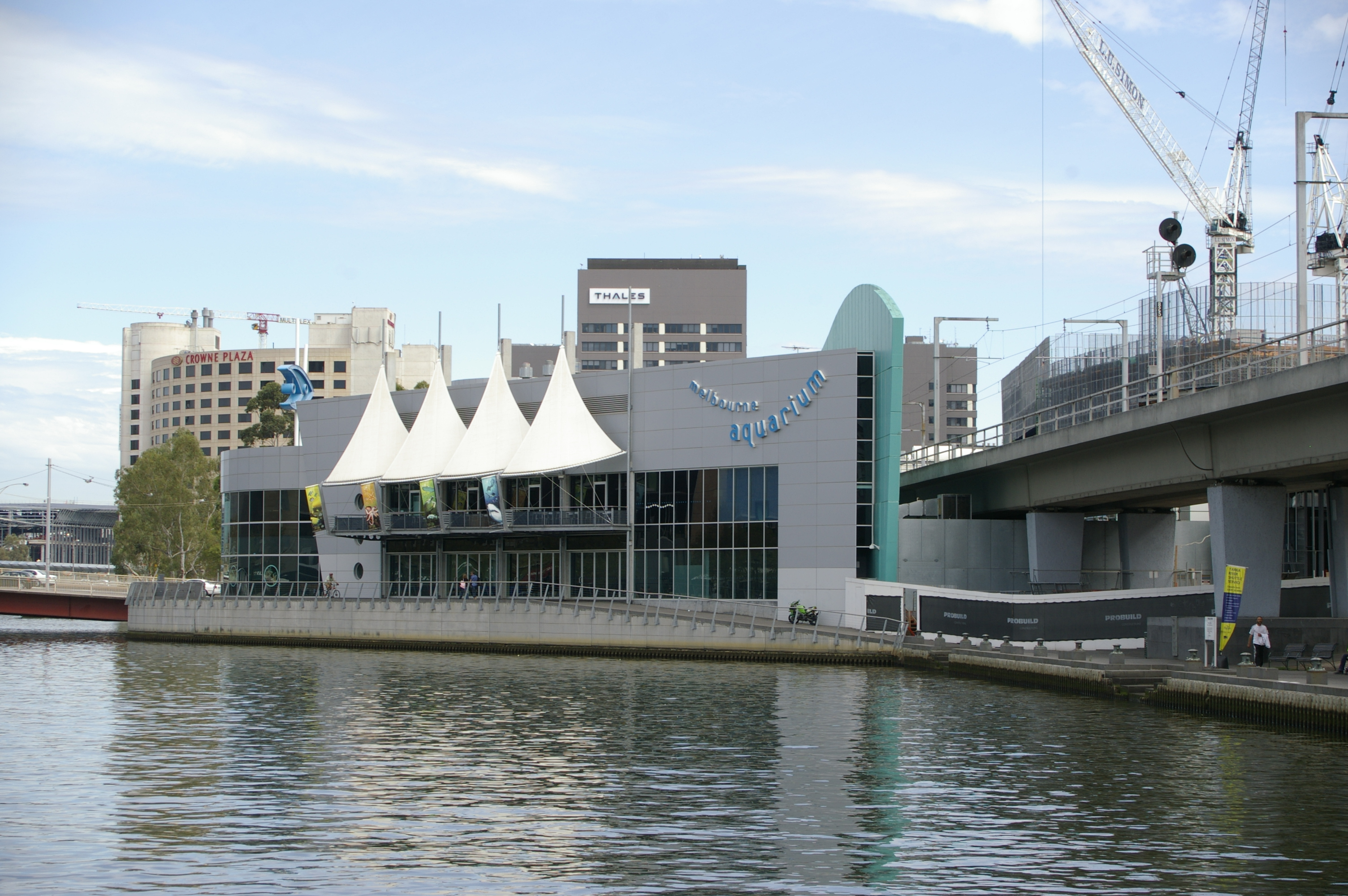
Sea Life Melbourne Aquarium view from the Queen's Bridge, before the rebranding

The aquarium is known for its main exhibit, the 2.2 million litre Mermaid Garden oceanarium, which features a grey nurse shark and sandbar whaler sharks, along with up to 2,000 marine creatures of diverse species.

== Research and conservation ==
Sea Life Melbourne Aquarium conducts extensive research into marine species, with the Aquarium's conservation efforts overseen by the Turtle Rehabilitation and Conservation of Keystone Species (T.R.A.C.K.S.) group, a subsidiary of the Sea Life Conservation Trust.

- Grey nurse sharks. Sea Life Melbourne Aquarium is involved in a grey nurse shark breeding program in conjunction with Sea Life Manly Aquarium, aimed at conserving this endangered species, which is already extinct in Victoria. The Aquarium currently has one grey nurse shark and the program is looking at intra-vitro fertilisation (IVF) as a method of breeding.
- Bamboo sharks. Sea Life Melbourne Aquarium is home to the first-ever in-vitro fertilised (IVF) shark in existence. The brown-banded bamboo shark pup was born on 3 March 2014, ending a process that began in September when aquarists collected a semen sample from a shark in Mooloolaba in northeastern Australia.
- Sea turtles. The aquarium is also involved in the rehabilitation of turtles washed south into the colder Victorian waters where they cannot survive. The sea turtles are housed at the aquarium to gain strength, at which point they are taken north to Queensland to be released.
- Seadragons. Melbourne Aquarium is one of few worldwide to have successfully bred the locally endemic weedy seadragon in captivity.
- Spotted Handfish. Sealife Melbourne Aquarium and has been the first facility to successfully sex and breed the Tasmanian spotted handfish in captivity.
- Purple Spotted Gudgeon. The rainforest area has opened a facility to captively breed the Southern Purple Spotted Gudgeon.

== Past attractions ==
Sea Life Melbourne Aquarium formerly had a giant squid exhibit (frozen, not alive), which was moved to UnderWater World in Queensland. The Aquarium was also home to angler fish, the Japanese spider crab, jellyfish, blood sucking leeches, horseshoe crabs, venomous scorpions and tarantulas.

== Ownership ==
In 2012, Merlin Entertainments, the global owner and operator of the Sea Life Centres brand as well as iconic brands such as Legoland and Madame Tussauds, purchased the Living and Leisure Group, then the owner-operators of the Melbourne Aquarium.

In late 2013, after an extensive $8 million investment and redevelopment by Merlin Entertainments, the aquarium relaunched under the Sea Life brand, joining up to 100 Merlin-owned attractions worldwide.

== Gallery ==
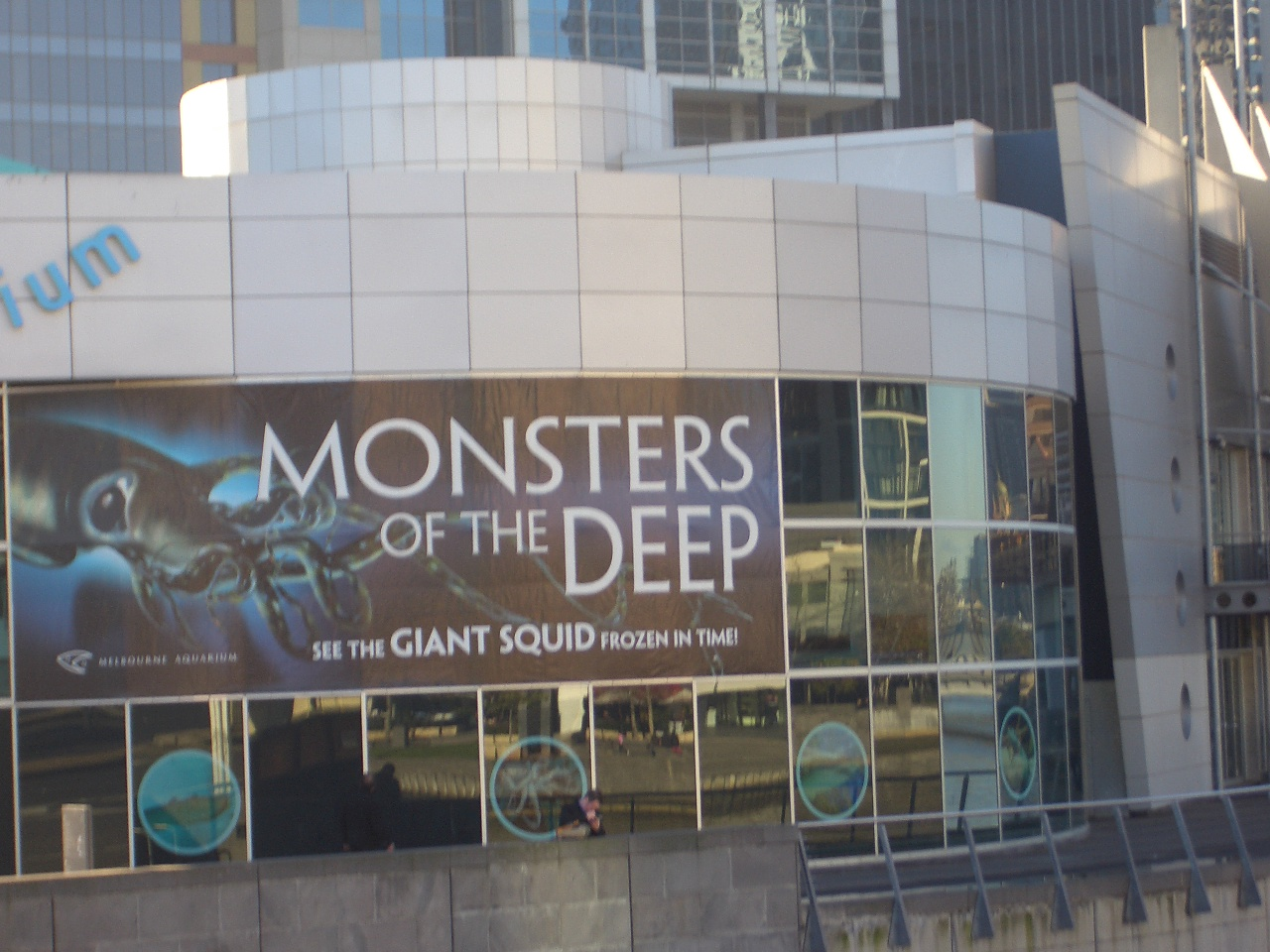

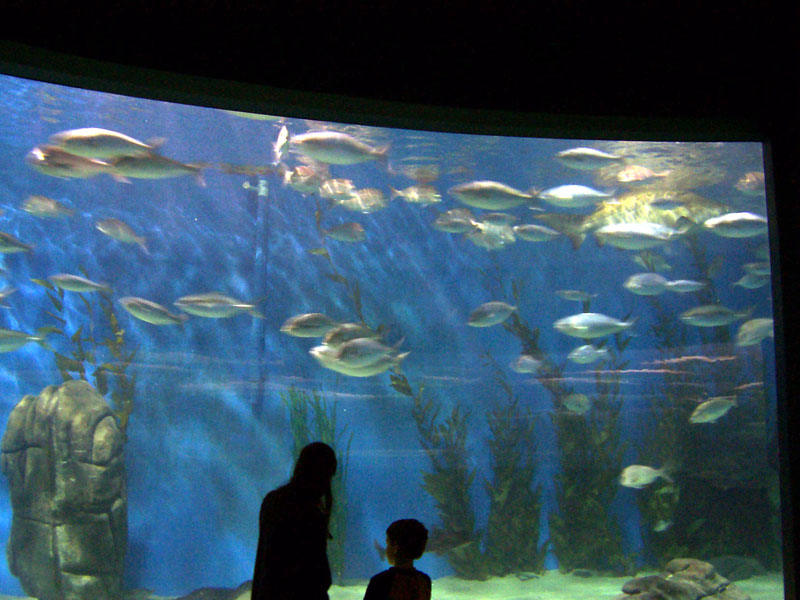

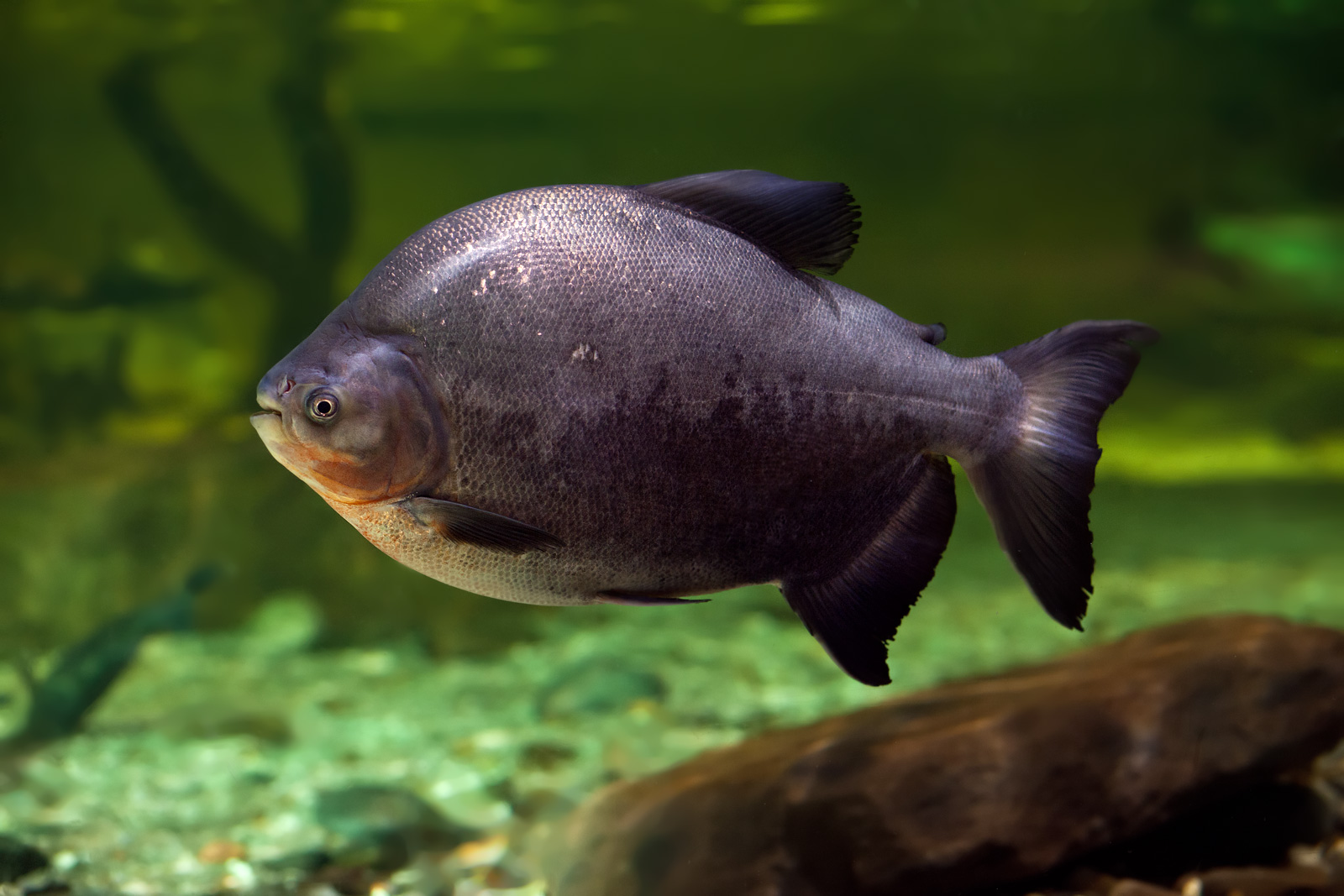
Colossoma macropomum in the aquarium

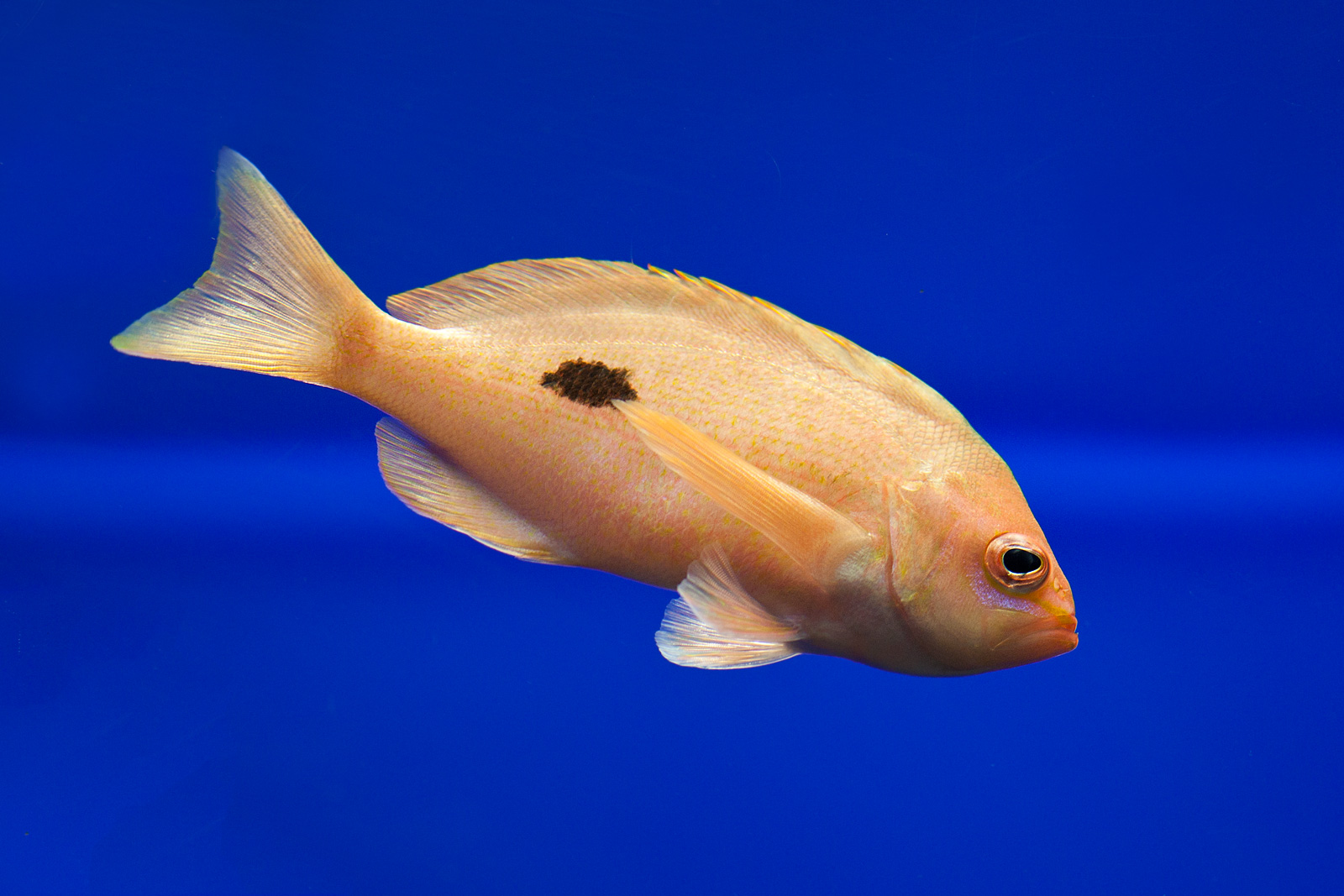
Caesioperca lepidoptera in the aquarium

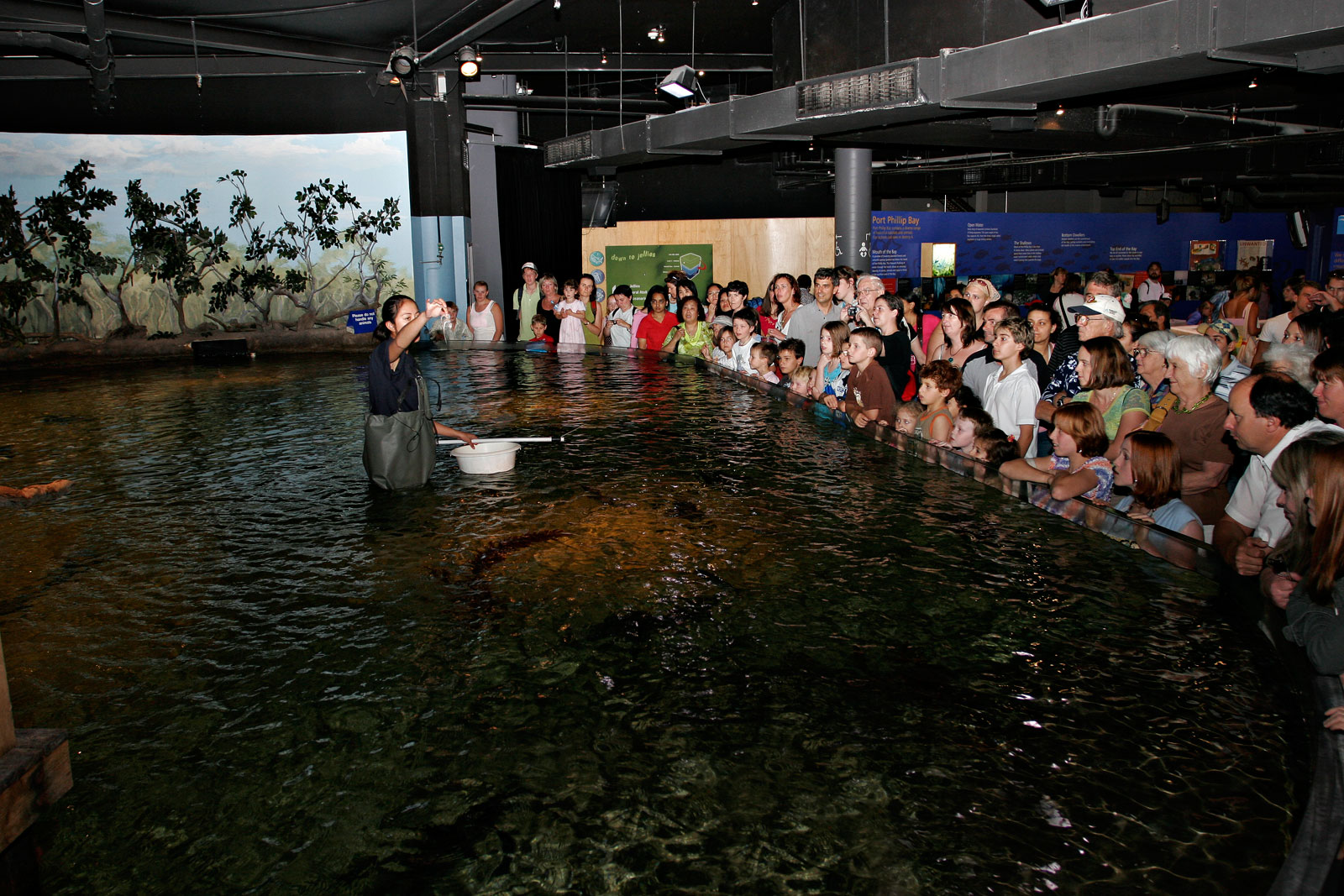
Feeding time in the Melbourne Aquarium

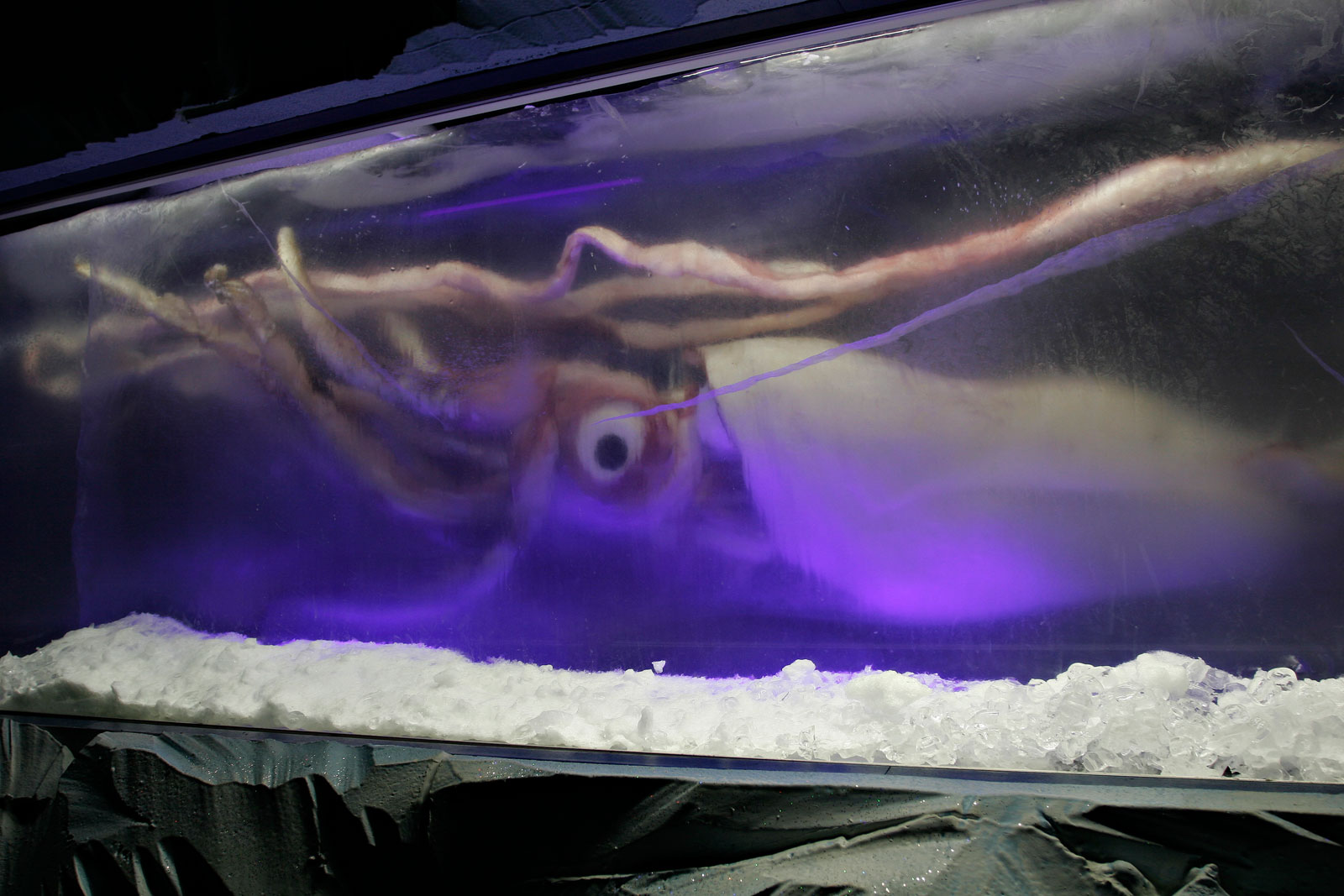
Giant squid in the aquarium

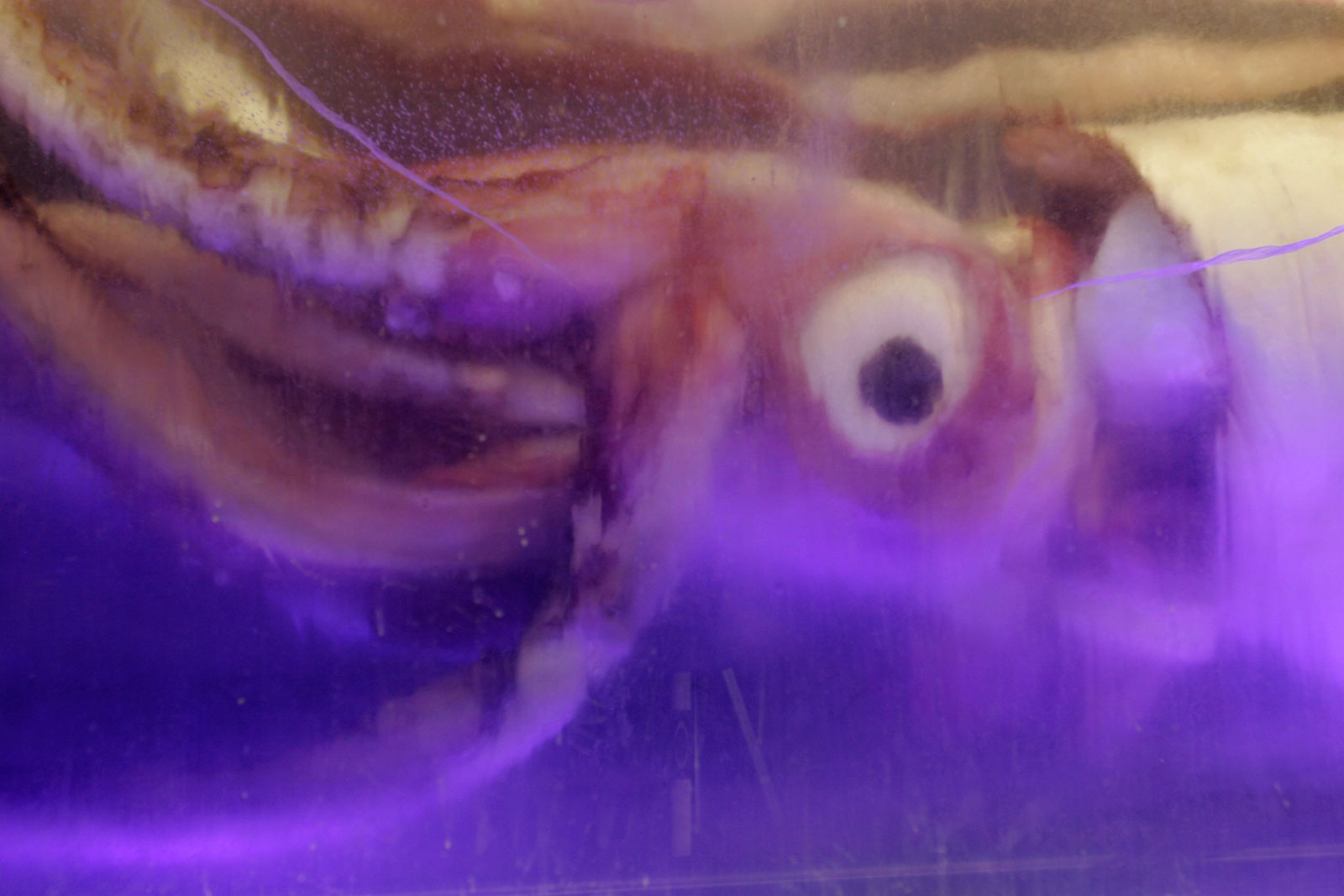
Head view of the giant squid

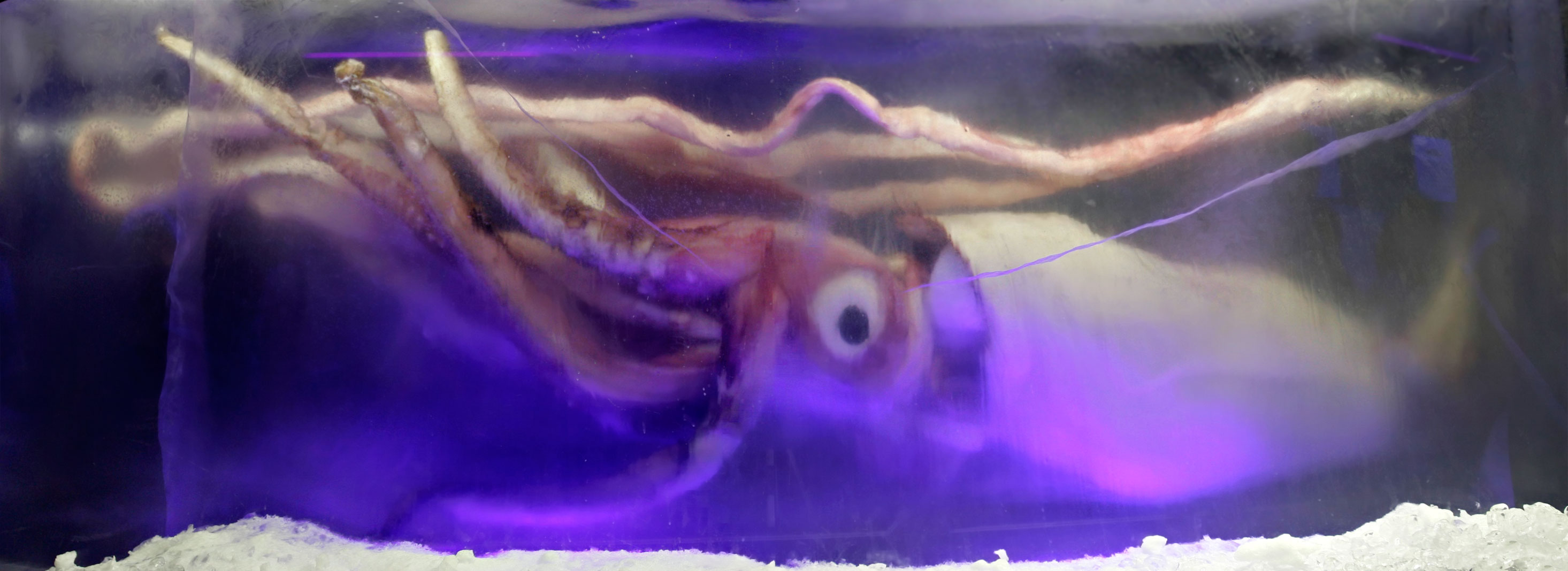
Giant squid

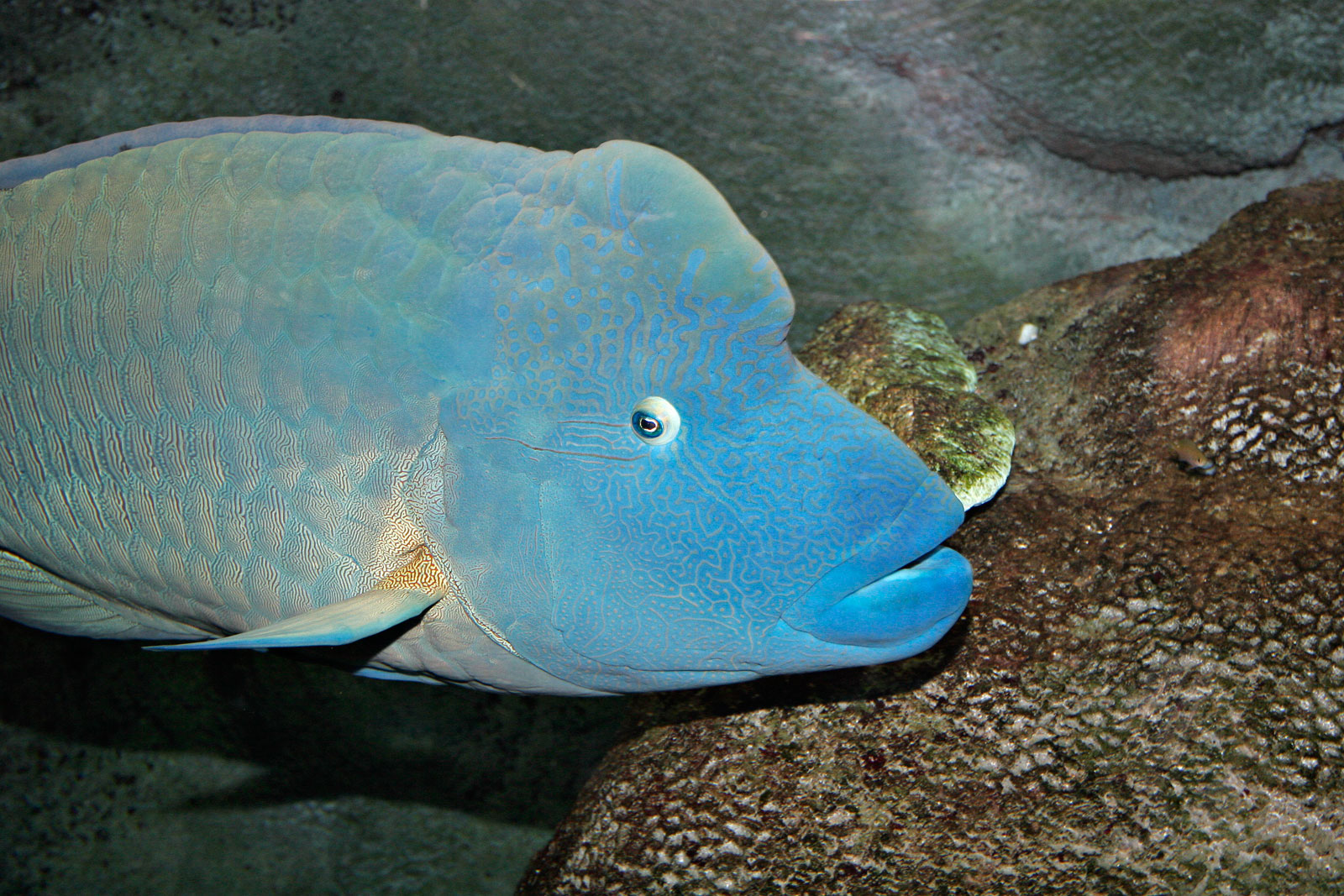
Humphead wrasse in the aquarium

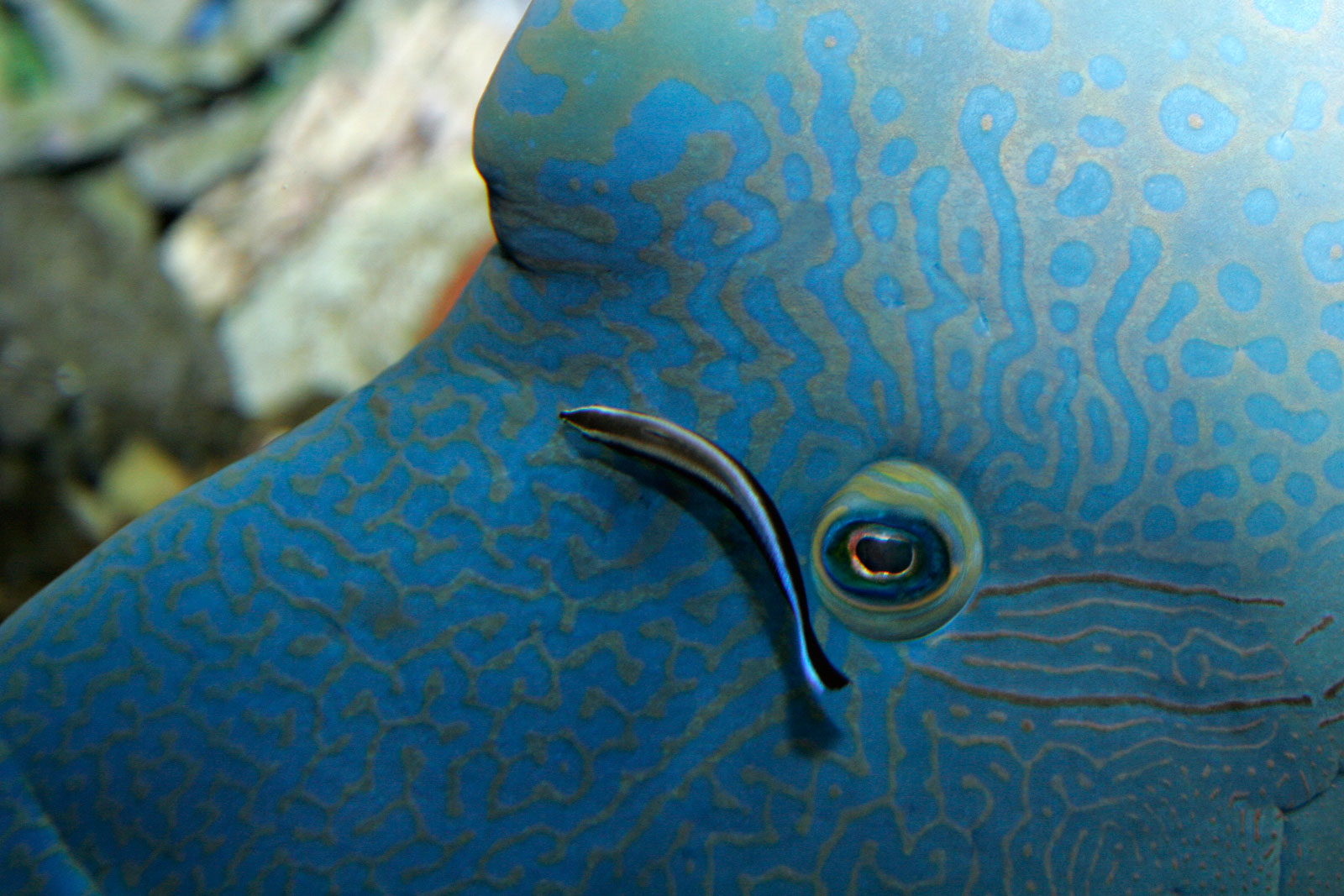
A humphead wrasse in the aquarium, showing its head

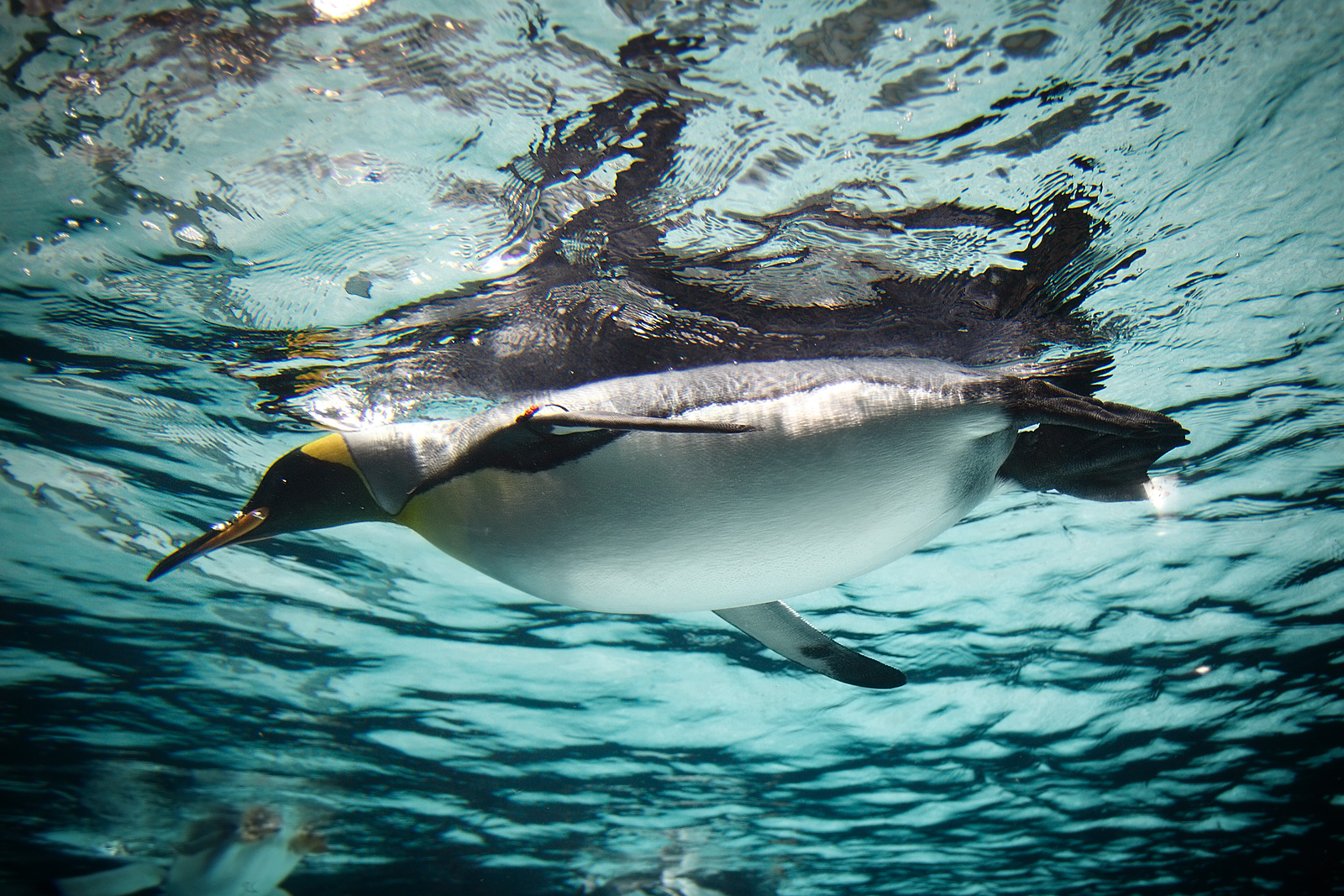
King penguin

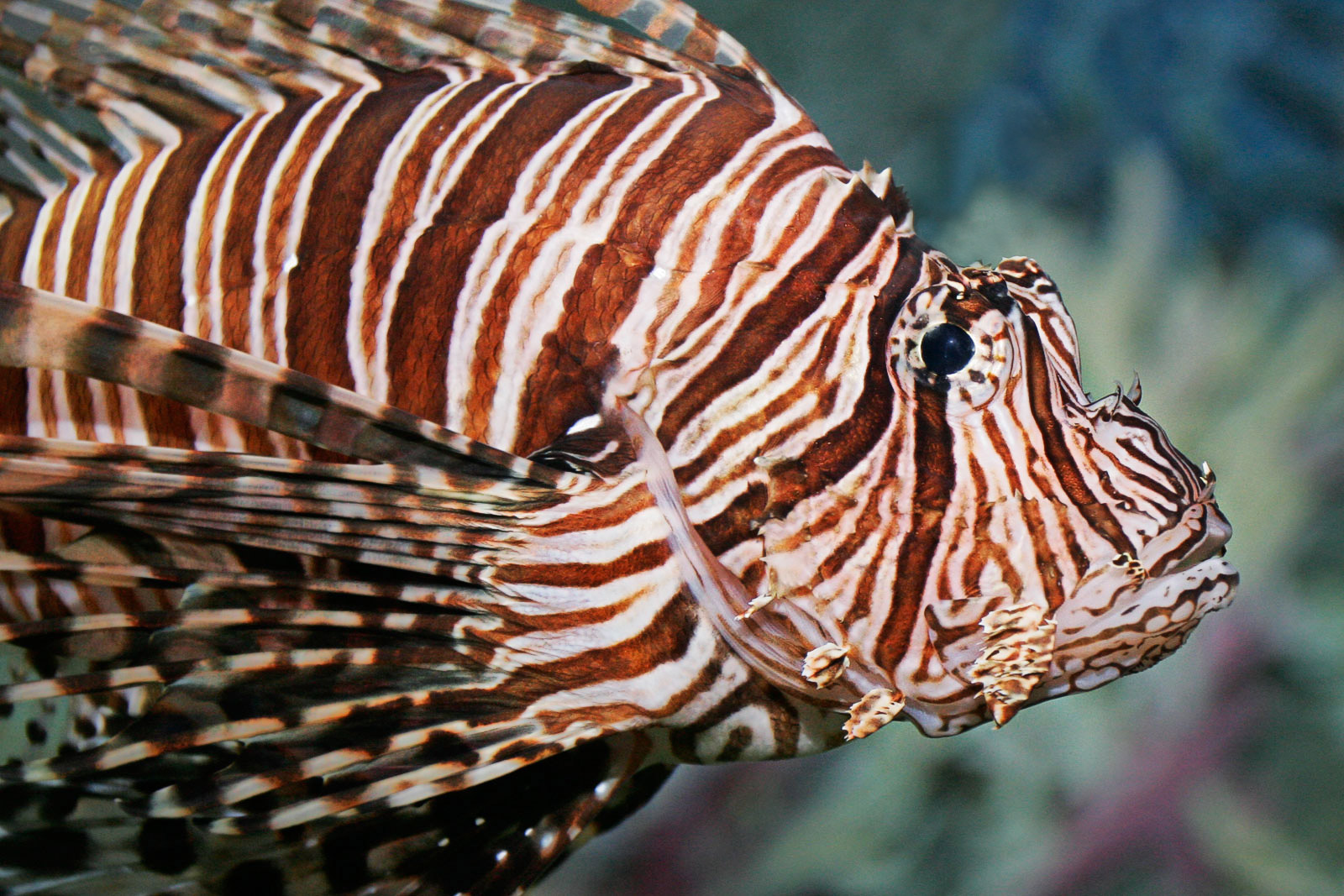
Lionfish

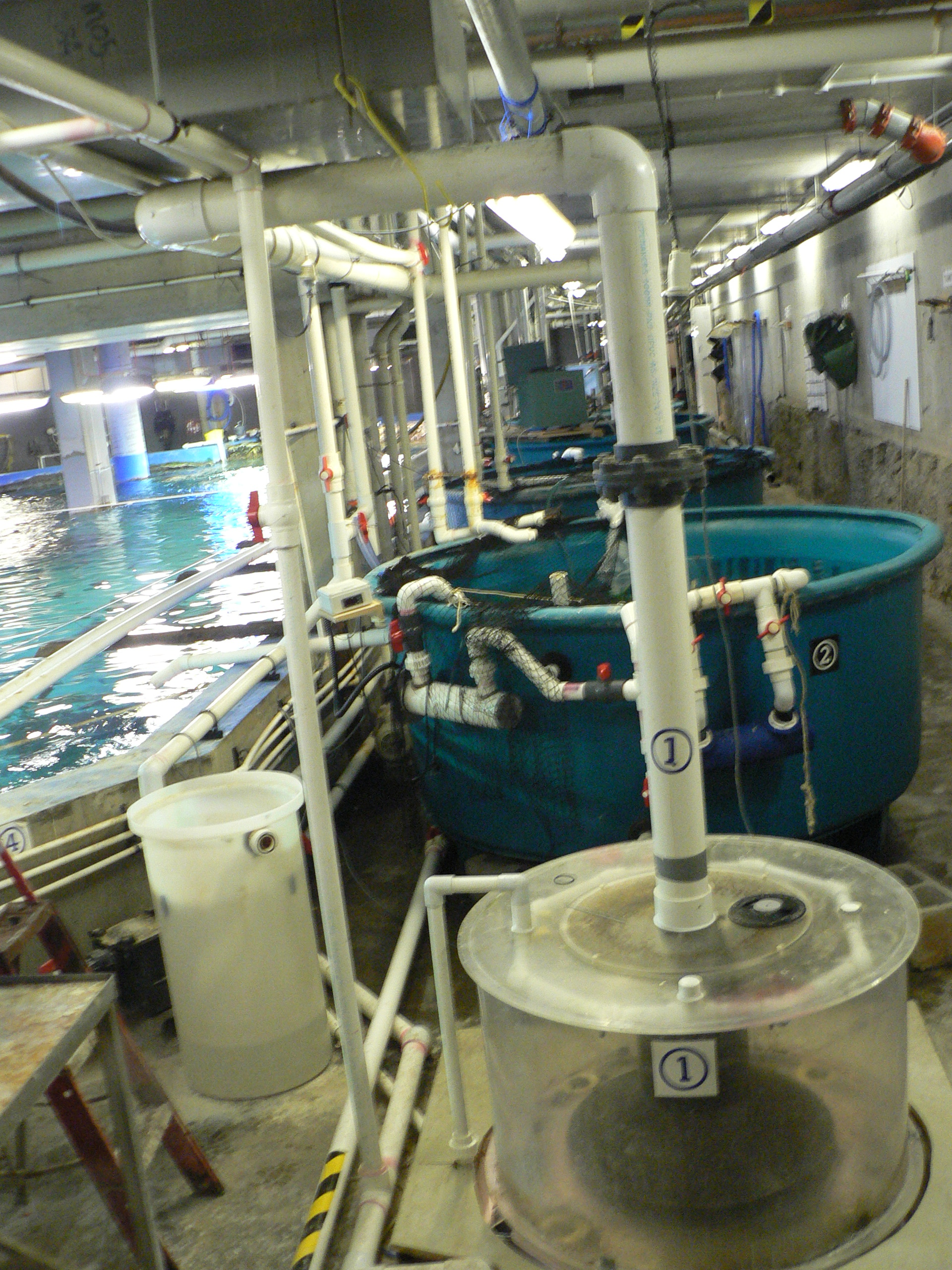
Pumps at the Melbourne Aquarium

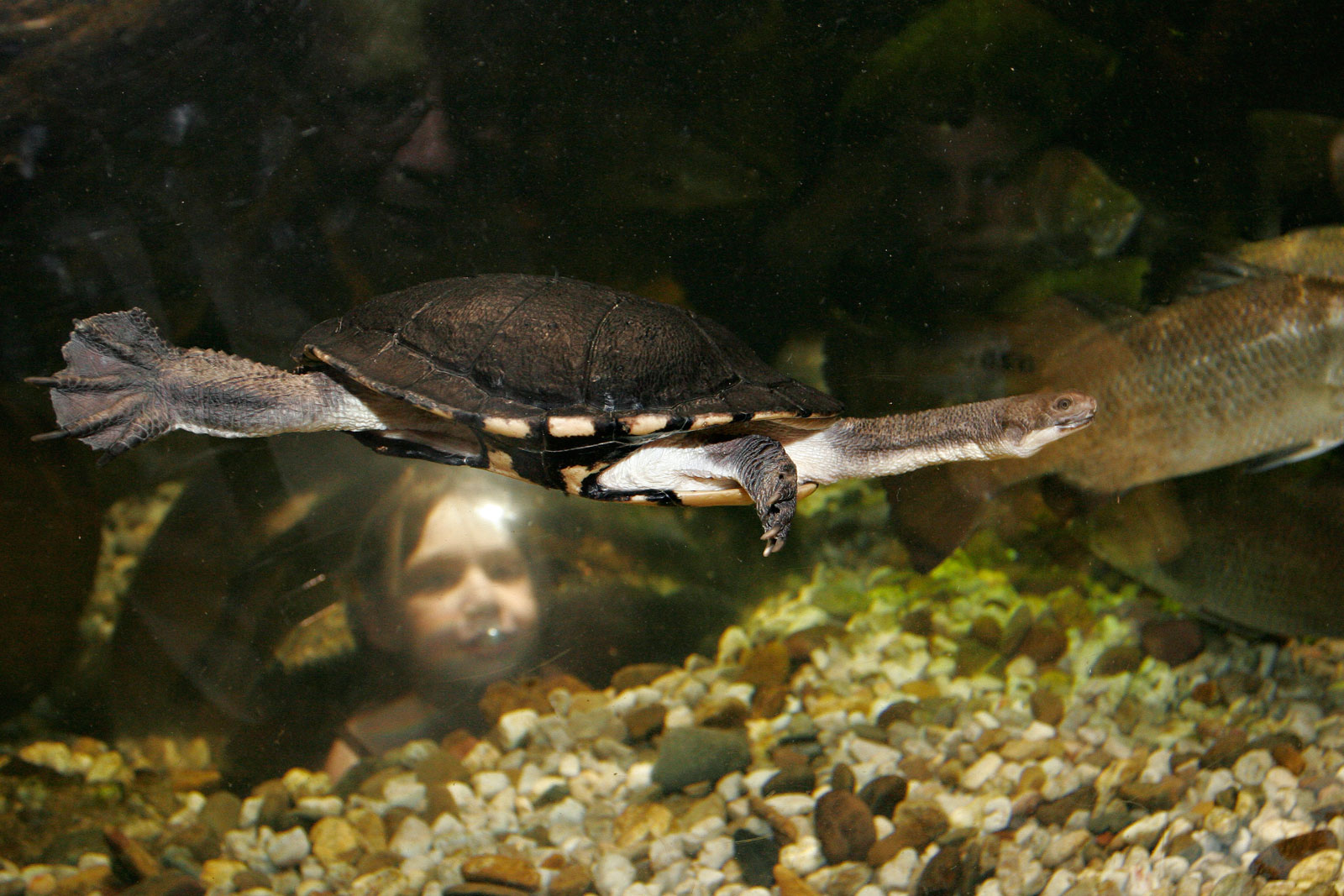
Observation hole

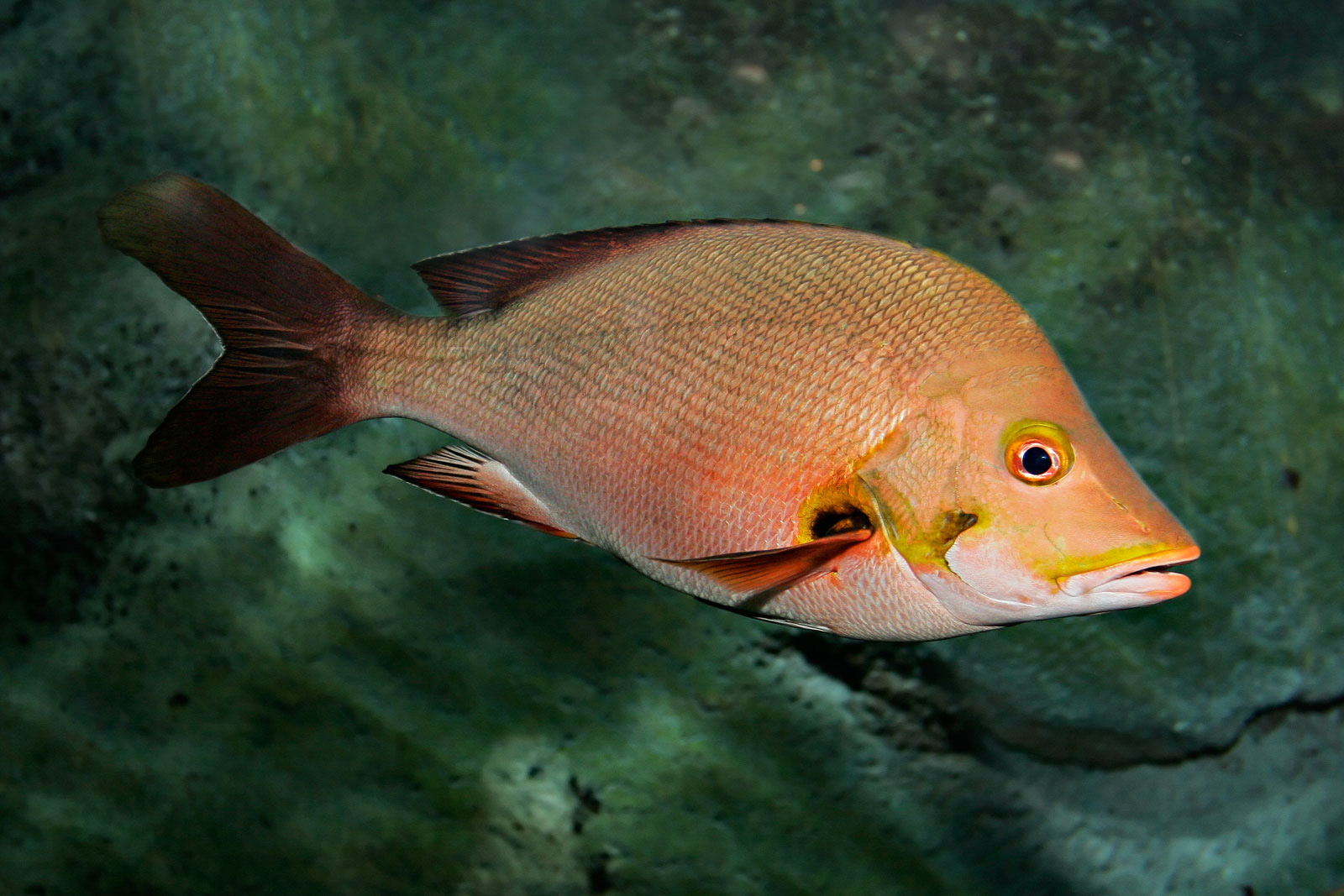

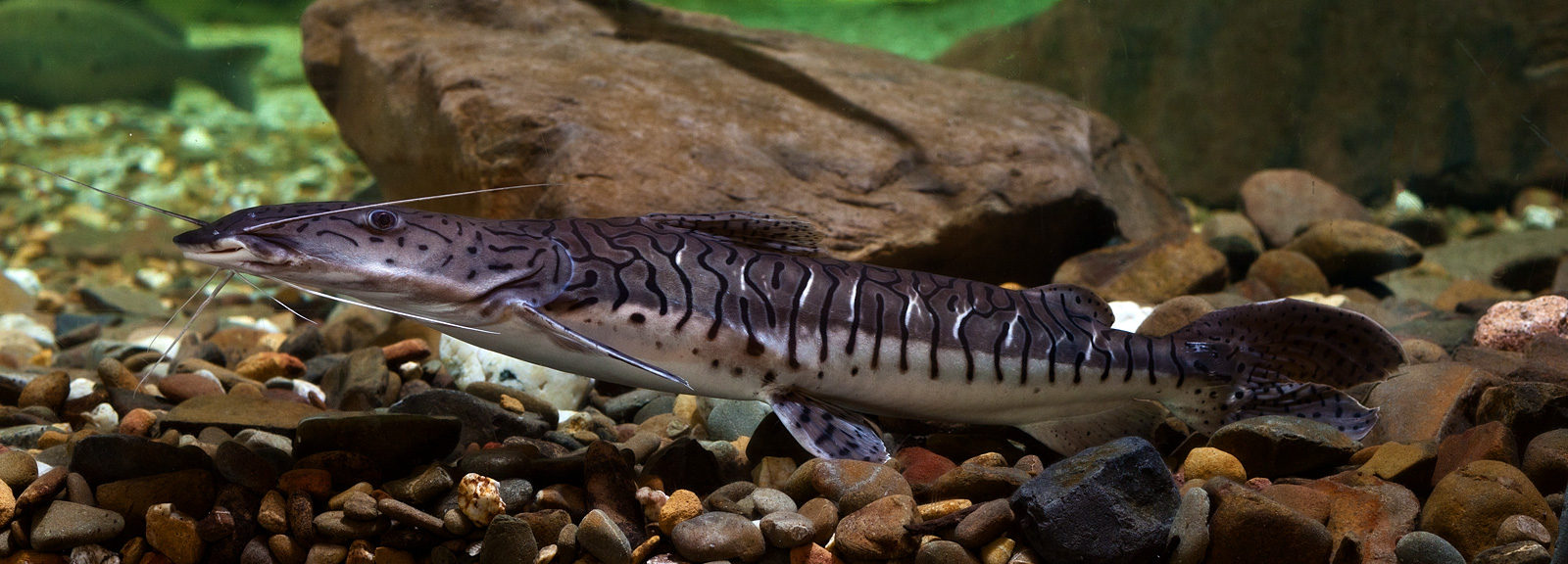

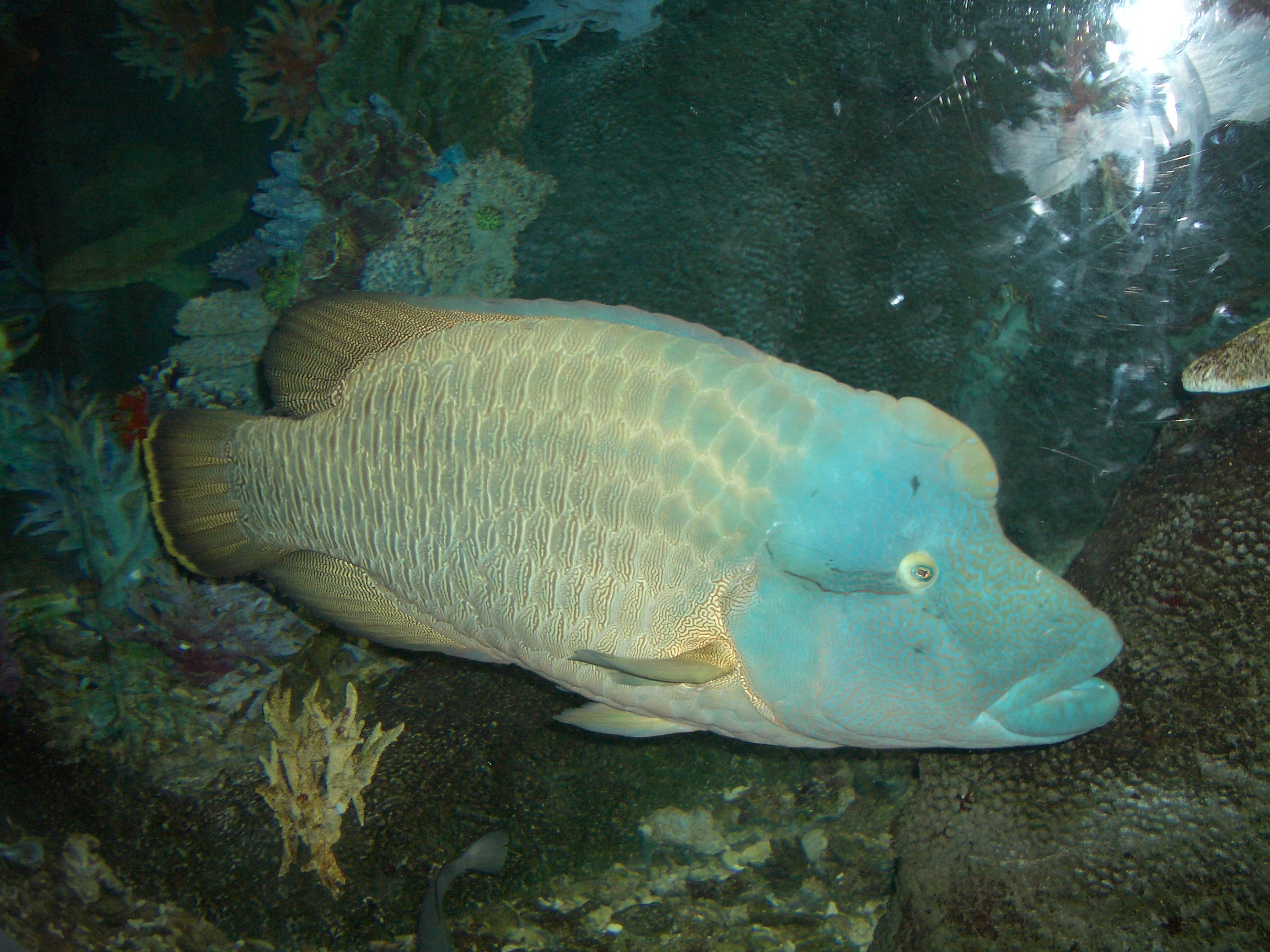
Humphead wrasse

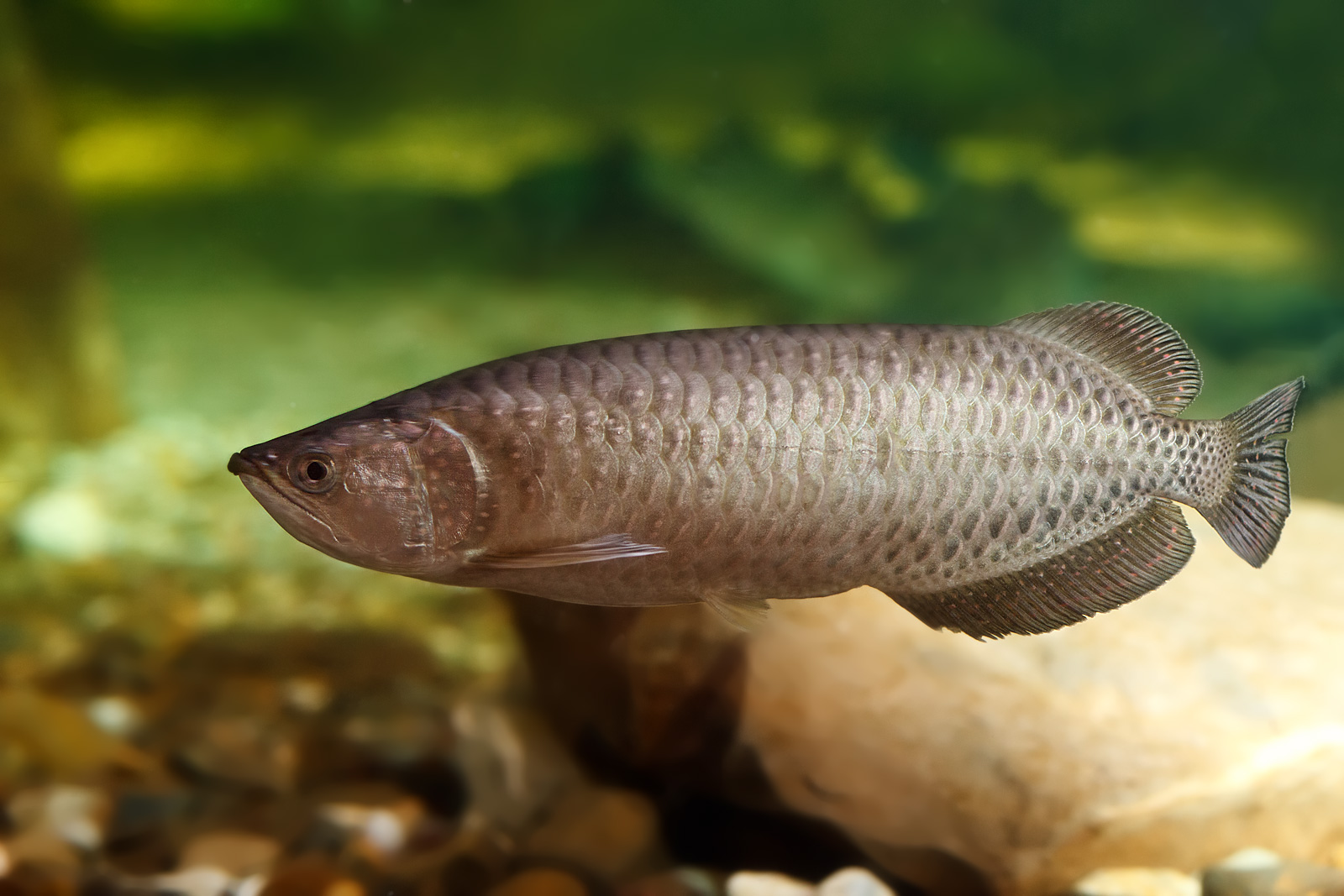
Scleropages

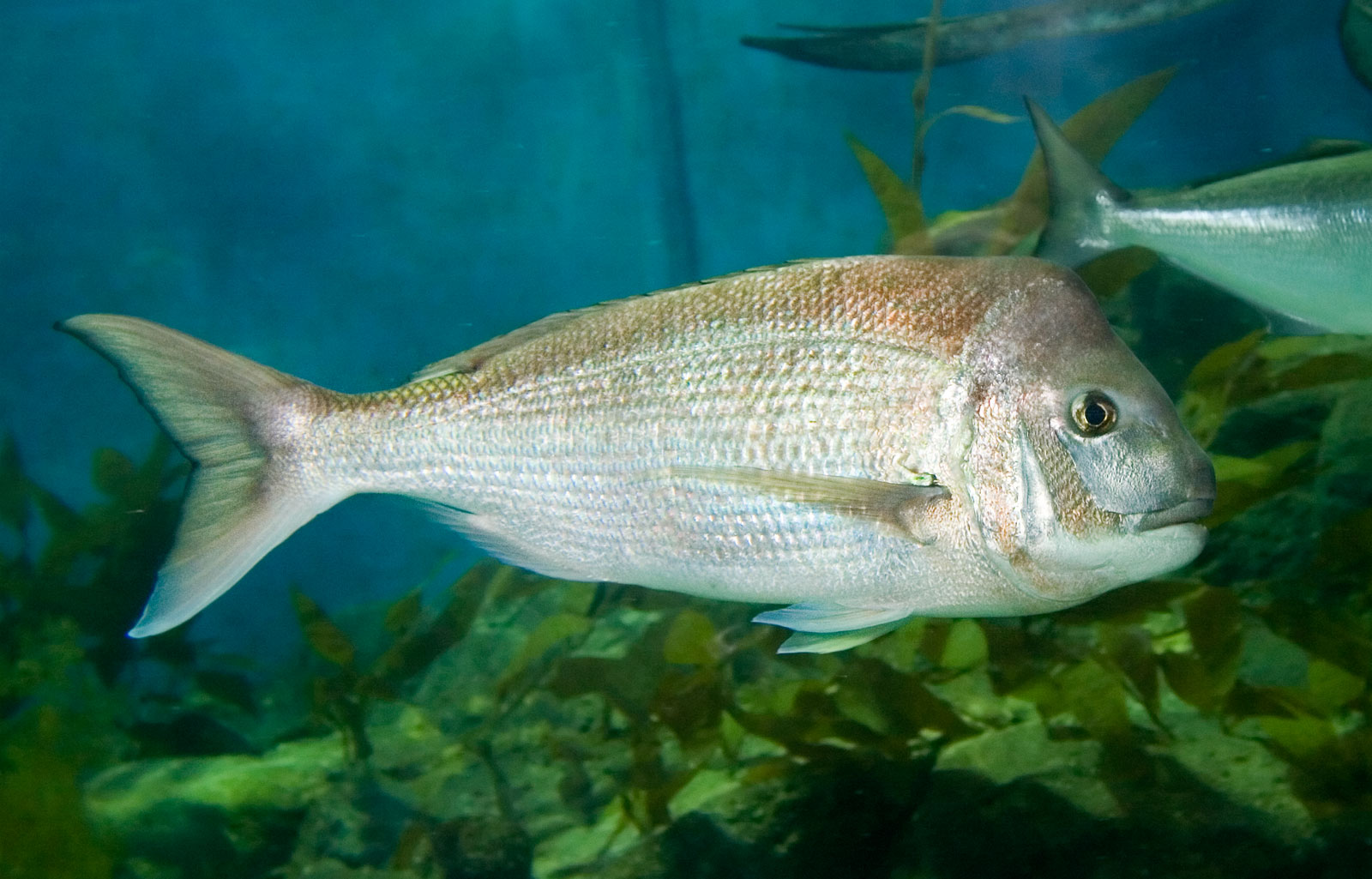

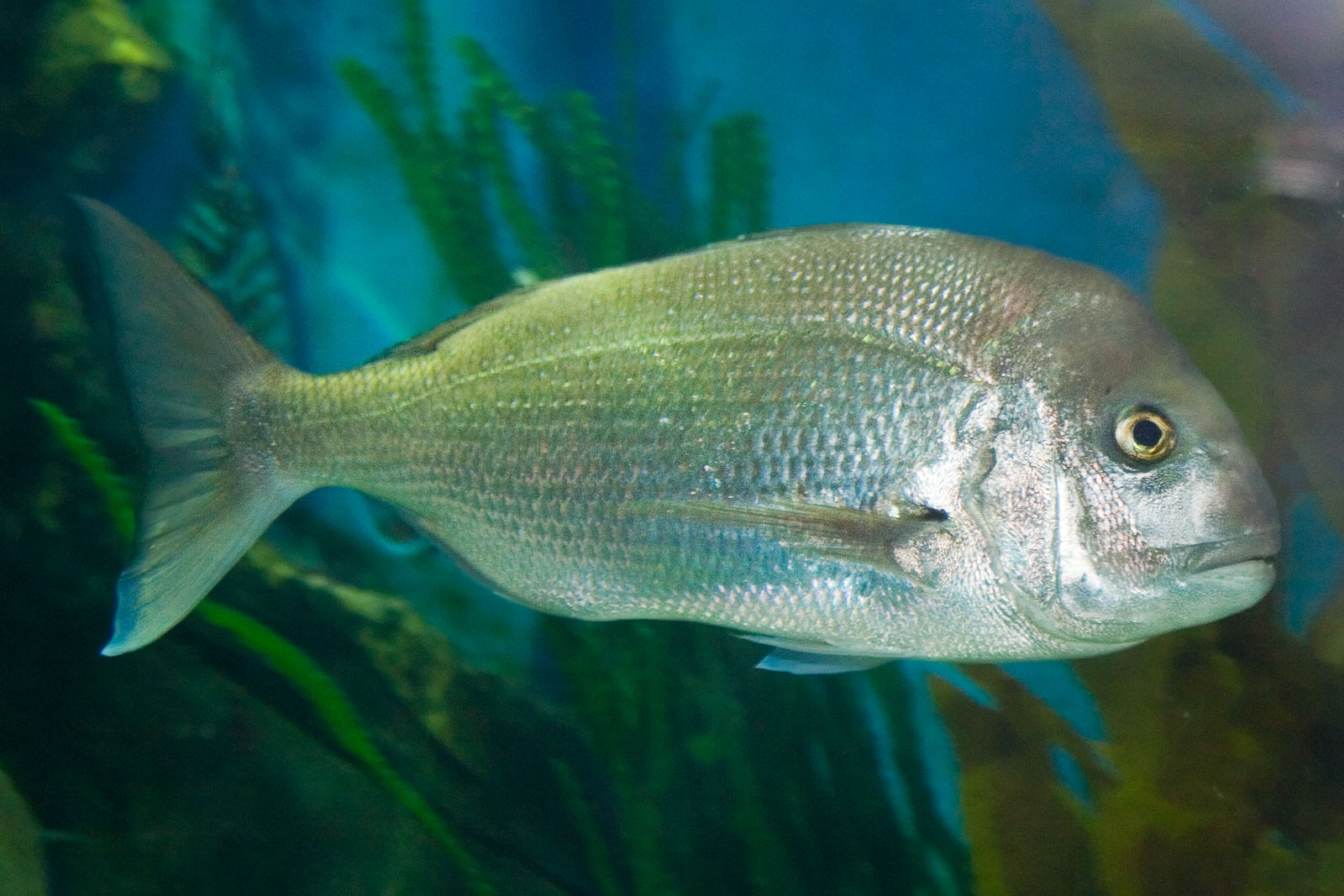

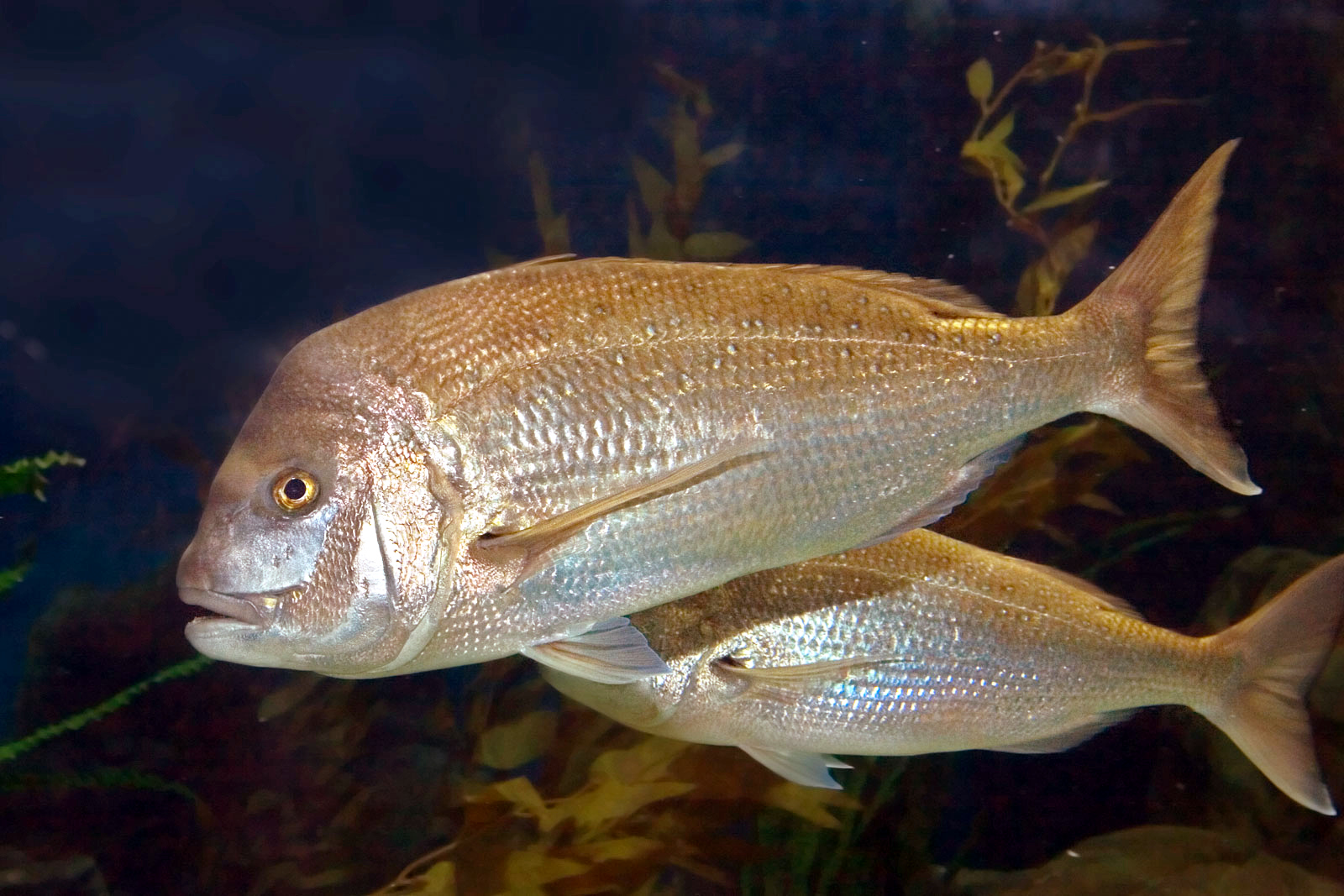

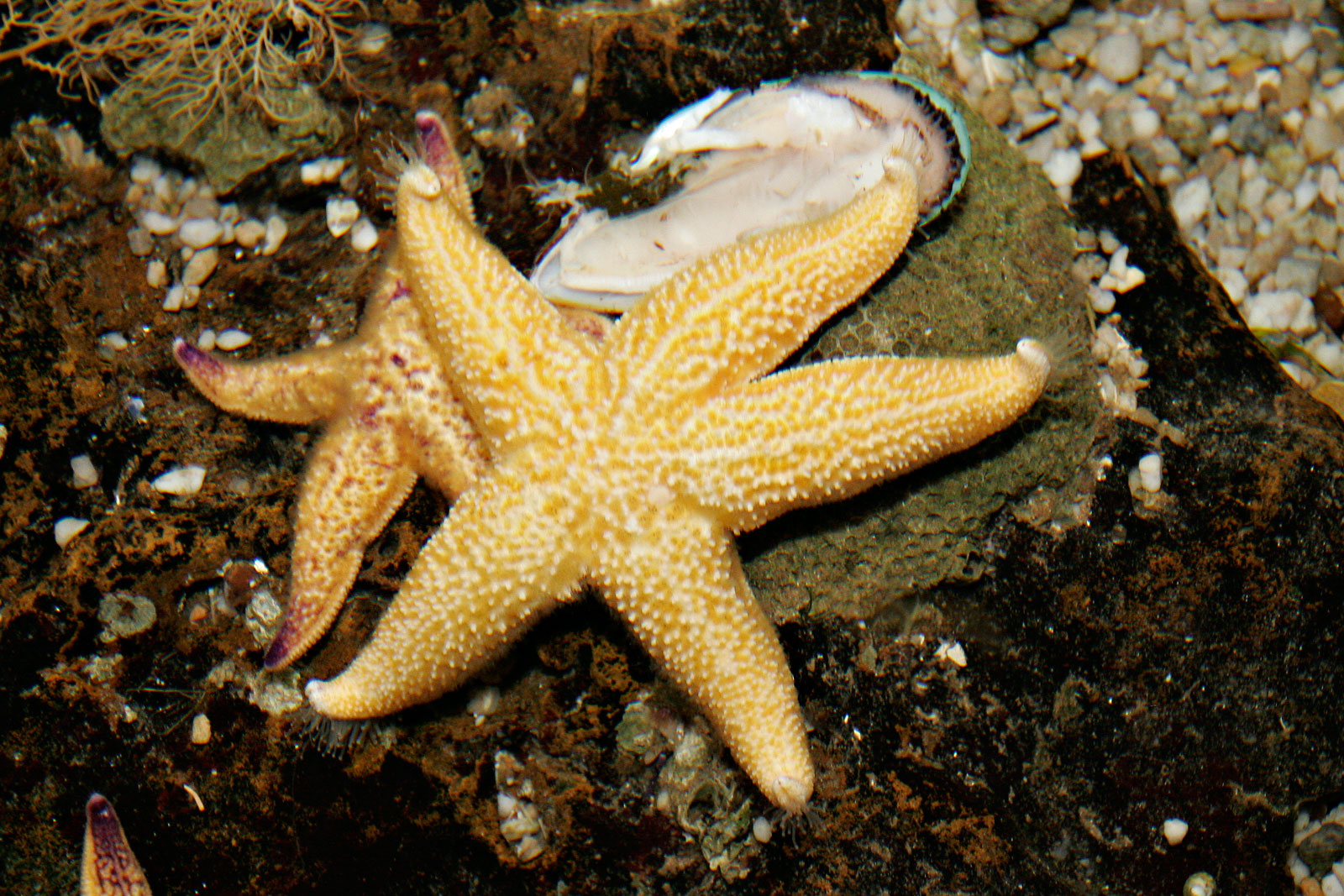
Starfish

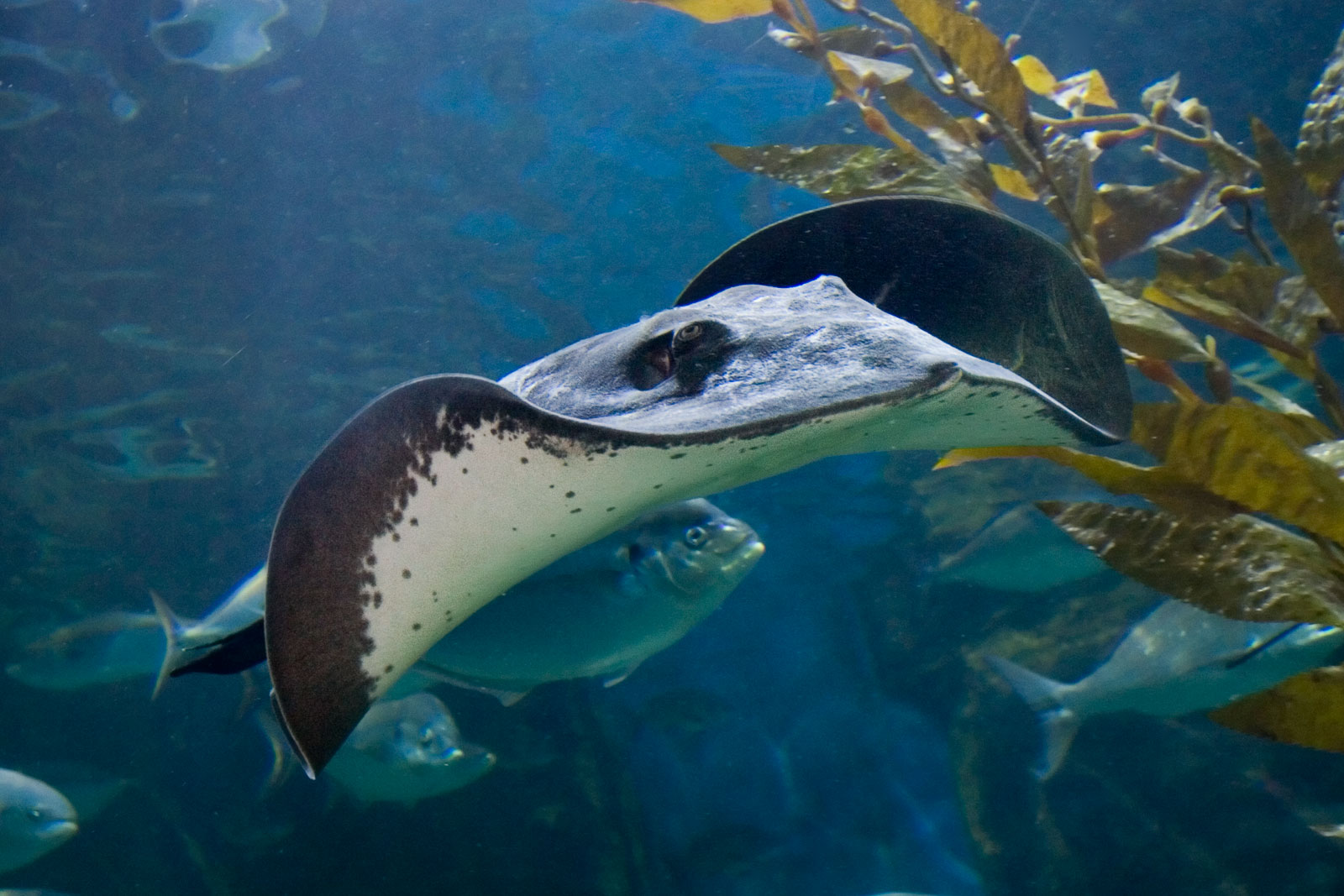
Stingray

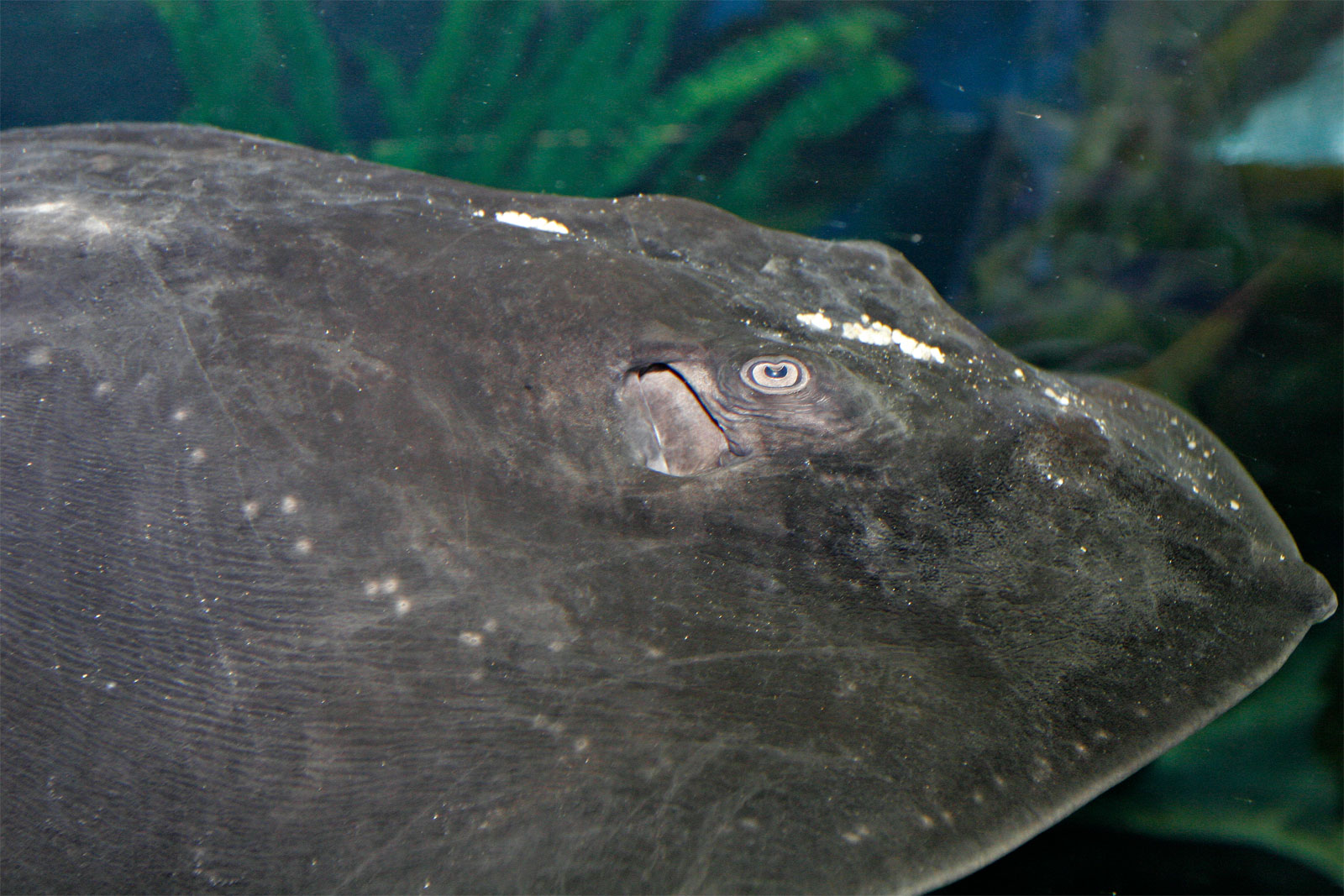
Stingray, showing its head view

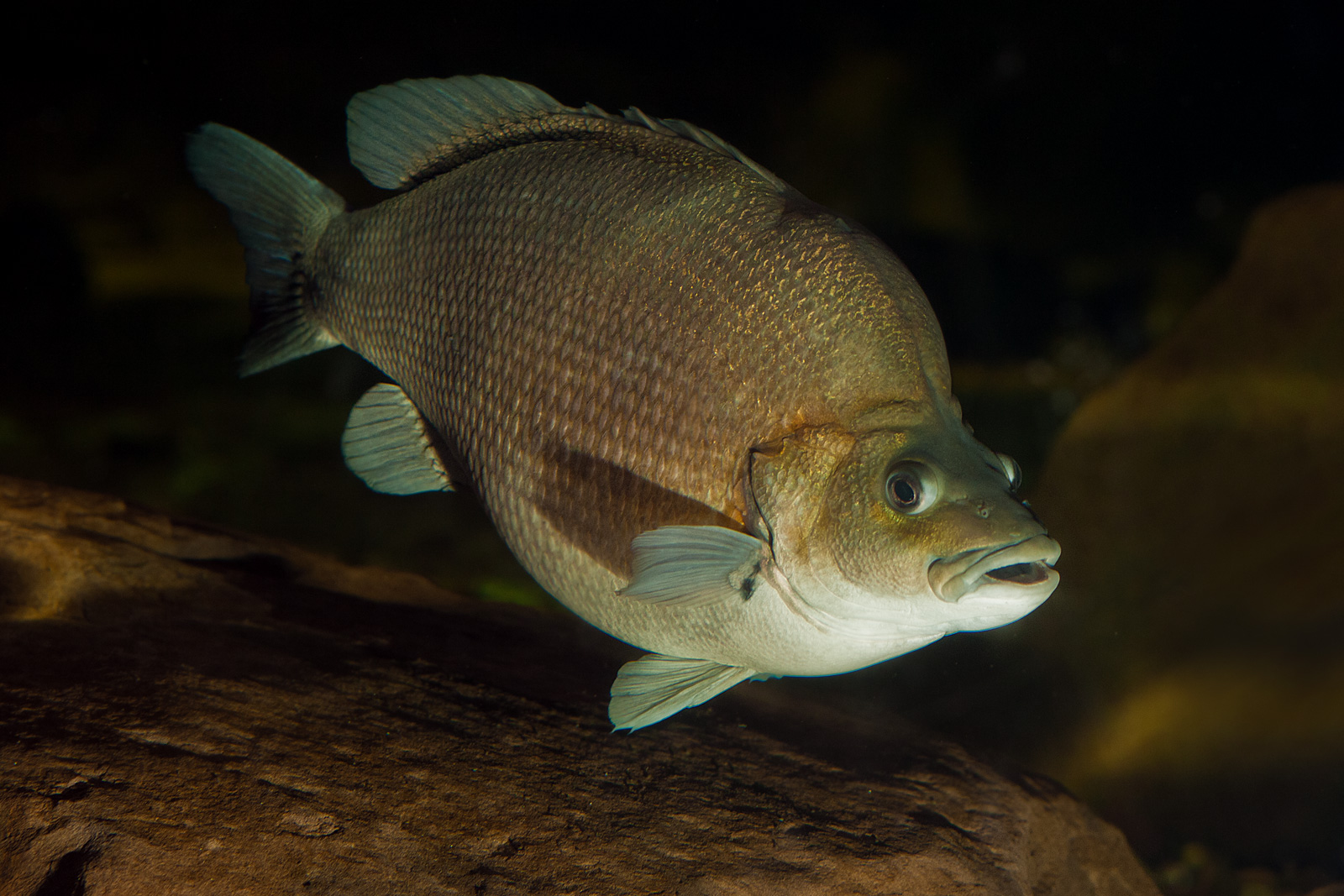

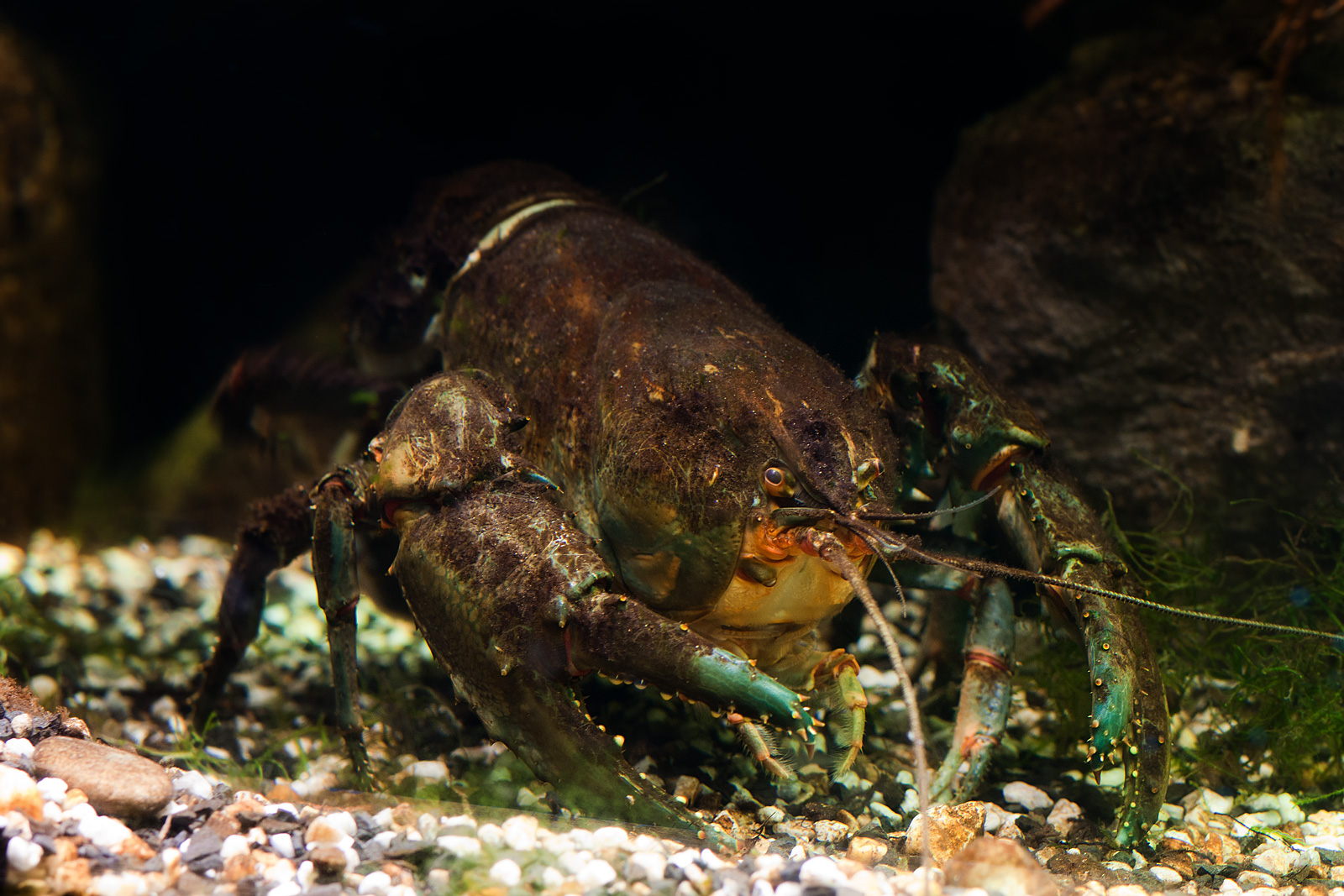
Lobster

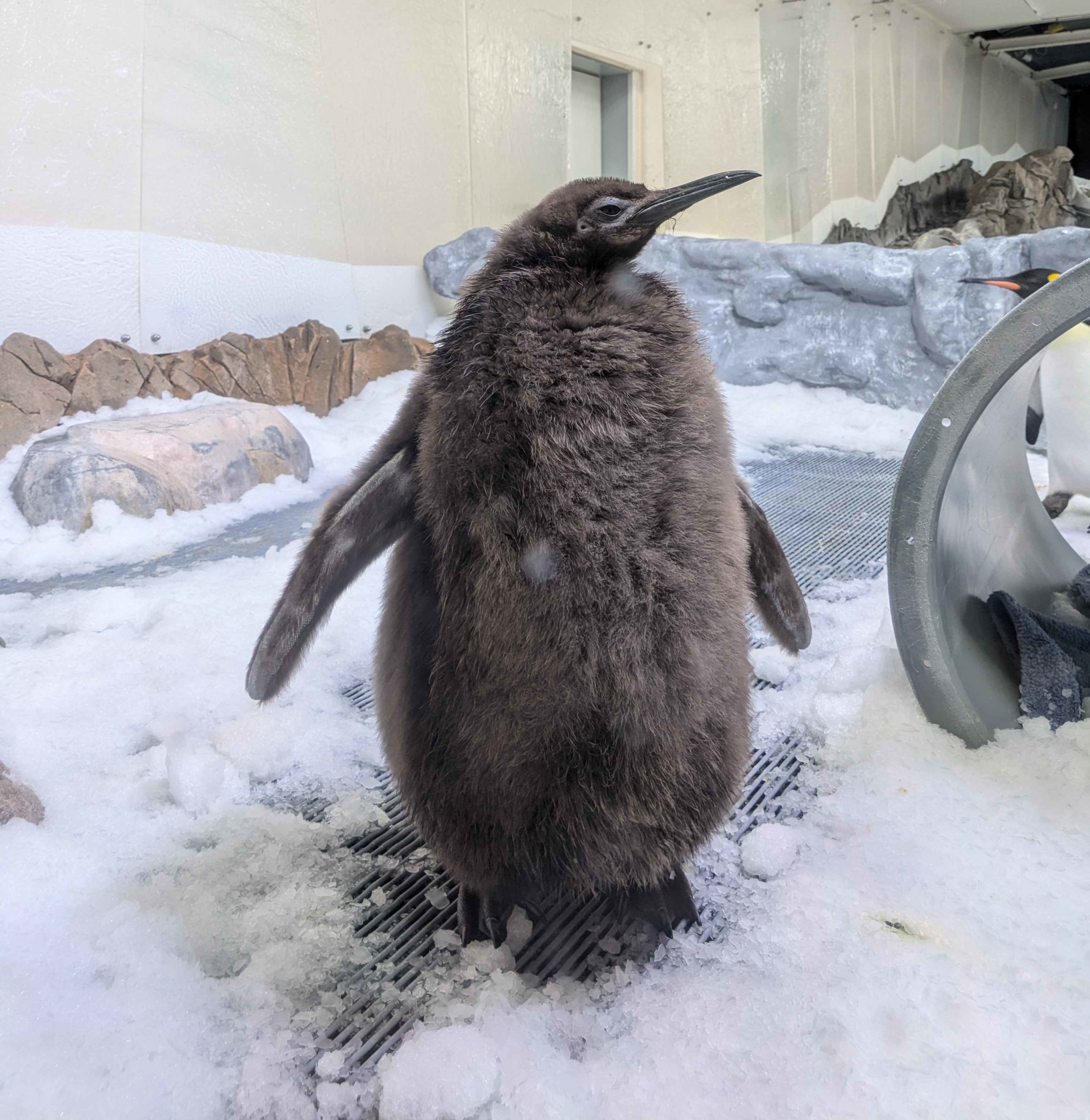
Pesto (penguin)

== See also ==
- Merlin Entertainments
- Melbourne Zoo
- Pesto (penguin)
- Sea Life Sydney Aquarium
