= Pesto (penguin) =

King penguin from Australia (born 2024)

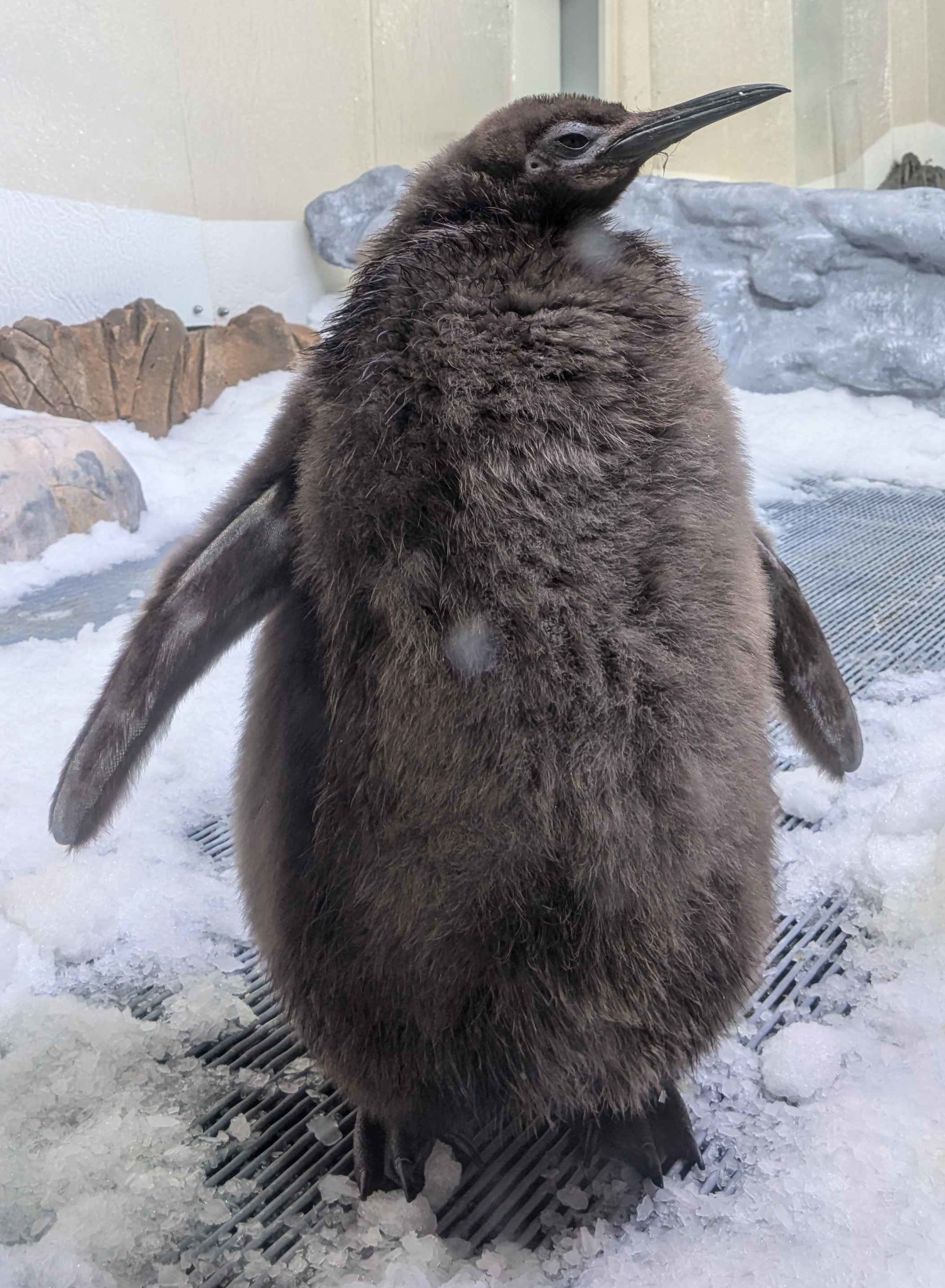
- Pesto in September 2024, prior to molting
- Species: King penguin
- Sex: Male
- Hatched: 30 January 2024 (age 2); Sea Life Melbourne Aquarium, Melbourne, Australia
- Weight: 15 kg (33 lb; 2 st 5 lb)

Pesto (hatched 30 January 2024) is a king penguin living at Sea Life Melbourne Aquarium who gained notability in September 2024 due to his exceptionally large size during his infancy.

== Life ==
Pesto was hatched 30 January 2024 at the Sea Life Melbourne Aquarium, and weighed 200 grams (7.1 oz) at birth. His biological father is Blake, another king penguin living at the aquarium, although keepers opted to have two younger penguins, Tango and Hudson, raise Pesto as foster parents. This decision was made in part due to Blake's age (22 years), and Tango and Hudson's lack of success in hatching their own eggs. Pesto was the first king penguin chick to be hatched at the aquarium since 2022. Pesto was first put on display at the aquarium in April 2024.

At the time of his gender reveal in September 2024, which was broadcast on social media, he weighed 21 kilograms (46 lb), making him the largest king penguin chick to ever live at the aquarium. By that month, he was eating about 25 fish per day and 24 kilograms (53 lb) of fish per week, a healthy quantity for adolescent penguins, and was 90 centimetres (35 in) tall. Pesto reached a weight of 24.8 kilograms (55 lb) at 10 months old; adult king penguins typically weigh between 9.5 kilograms (21 lb) and 18 kilograms (40 lb). Despite being a chick, he weighed more than his parents Hudson and Tango combined, although he was expected to lose weight after molting. Sea Life Melbourne Aquarium partly attributed his large size to genetics, as his biological father Blake is the largest penguin at the aquarium, and partly to care by his foster parents.

In late October 2024, Pesto began to molt, losing his baby feathers and growing adult feathers. His lower body and wings started molting first, with white adult feathers emerging on the lower body, while his upper body still retained brown feathers. Pesto's appearance mid-molt was compared to wearing a "high collared jacket". Although king penguins usually molt at ten to twelve months old, Pesto began molting at around nine months old. The amount of food available to him has been suggested as an explanation for his early molting. The molt was expected to last three or four weeks, ending in late November.

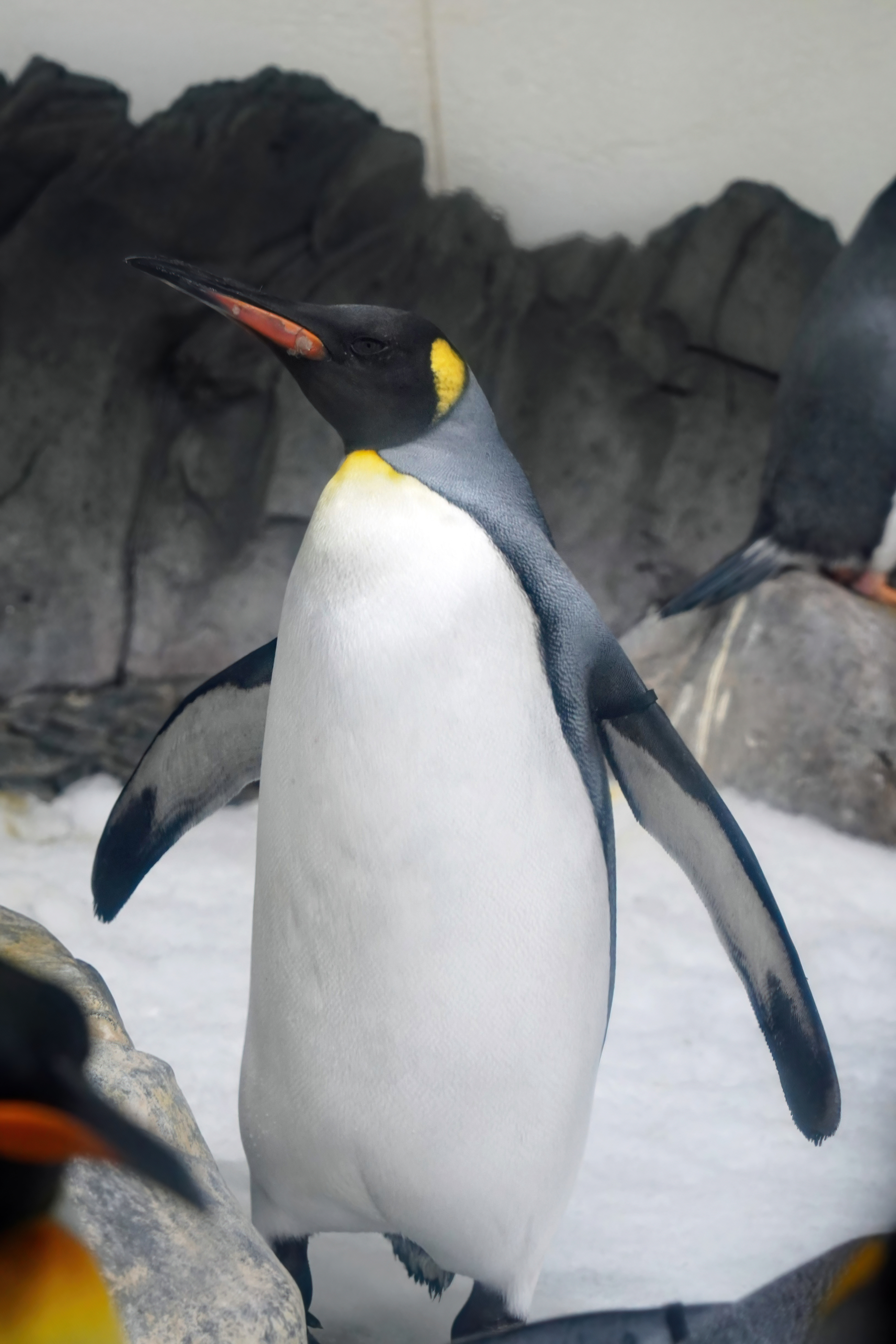
Pesto in July 2025, with his adult plumage

Pesto's first birthday was celebrated by the aquarium on 31 January 2025, with celebrations being organized over two days. At that time, Pesto was reported to have lost around 10 kilograms (22 lb) of weight compared to before his shedding, and to have developed a close relationship with a female penguin named Pudding, born in 2022. The two were reported to engage in canoodling and mutual grooming, while still younger than breeding age. Pesto's adult personality has been described as "adventurous" and "cheeky", and he has been reported to follow and sing to zookeepers cleaning his enclosure. As an adult, he is slightly taller than most other penguins, and wears a wing band for identification, colored brown, orange and black.

== Cultural impact ==
Pesto has received extensive attention online, becoming an Internet meme on TikTok due to his large size. He has affectionately been described by fans as a "fatty", an "absolute unit", and a "linebacker". While visiting Melbourne for the 2024 AFL Grand Final, American singer Katy Perry stated that she wanted to kiss Pesto. She met with the penguin on 27 September, although she did not kiss him due to biosecurity measures. Pesto was similarly visited by American singer Olivia Rodrigo on 11 October during her Guts World Tour.

On 9 October, a mural depicting Pesto surrounded by four much smaller adult penguins was unveiled in the Melbourne central business district. Painted by local artist Lukas Kasper, the mural was commissioned by the Sea Life Melbourne Aquarium.

Pesto's popularity led to a 30% increase in visits of Sea Life Melbourne Aquarium in 2024. Merchandise was also sold by the zoo, which, according to a representative, had to "pull stock from around the world" to satisfy the demand in penguin plushies driven by Pesto. The zoo also sold "Penguin Passports" offering a behind-the-scenes tour of the enclosure for a higher price, described by University of Otago professor Neil Carr as also being performative in essence, and contrasting with rehabilitation work in areas inaccessible to the public. The effects of short bursts in popularity for Pesto and other animals were criticized by the Born Free Foundation, which stated that despite benefits for the zoo, the animals themselves had little prospects for reintroduction in the wild.

== See also ==
- Hua Hua, a baby panda that gained online popularity in 2024
- Moo Deng, a baby pygmy hippopotamus that gained online popularity in September 2024
