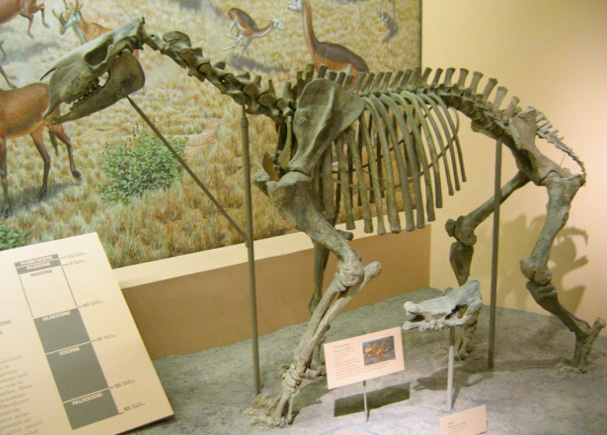
- Moropus elatus at the National Museum of Natural History, Washington, DC

Scientific classification
- Kingdom: Animalia
- Phylum: Chordata
- Class: Mammalia
- Order: Perissodactyla
- Suborder: †Ancylopoda
- Superfamily: †Chalicotherioidea; Gill, 1872

Families
- Chalicotheriidae; Eomoropidae

= Chalicotherioidea =

Chalicotherioidea Temporal range: 48.6–0.005 Ma Early Eocene to Middle Pleistocene

Extinct superfamily of mammals

Chalicotherioidea (from Ancient Greek χάλιξ (khálix), meaning "gravel", and θηρίον (theríon), meaning "beast") is an extinct superfamily of clawed perissodactyls (odd-toed ungulates) that lived from the early Eocene to the early Pleistocene subepochs. Based on the fossil record they emerged and thrived largely in Eurasia, although specimens have been found in both Africa and North America. They were likely browsers that fed mainly on leaves, twigs, and other nonresistant vegetation. Many of the contained genera had derived specializations of the forelimb and manus that allowed the claws to be used as hooks for browsing and to be kept off of the ground while walking. Chalicotheres lived primarily in forested areas. Size sexual dimorphism and morphological structures such as the domed skulls of Tylocephalonyx suggest agonistic behaviour in some sort of social setting. They are related to modern day horses, rhinoceroses, and tapirs, as well as the extinct brontotheres.

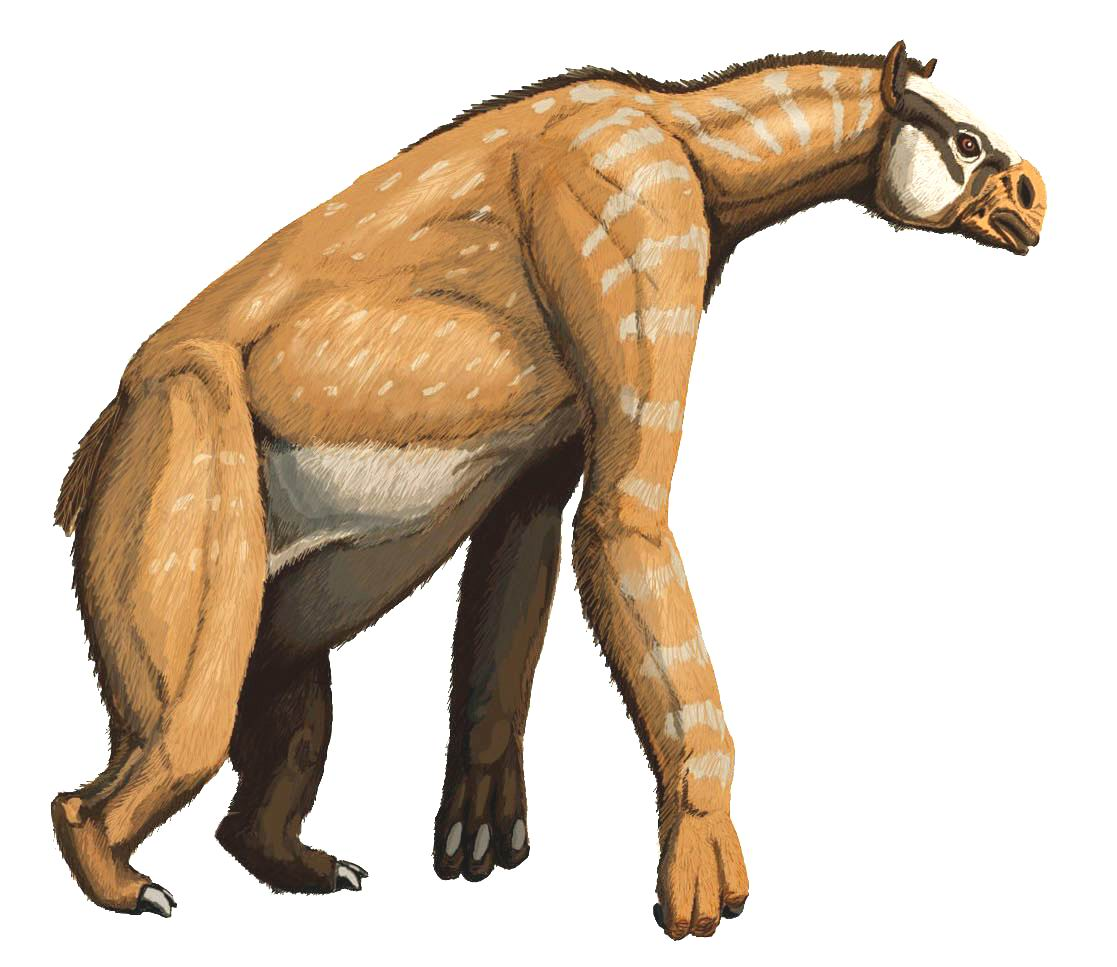
Anisodon grande, formerly Chalicotherium grande.
