= Research history of Anoplotherium =

Studies of a genus of endemic Paleogene European artiodactyls

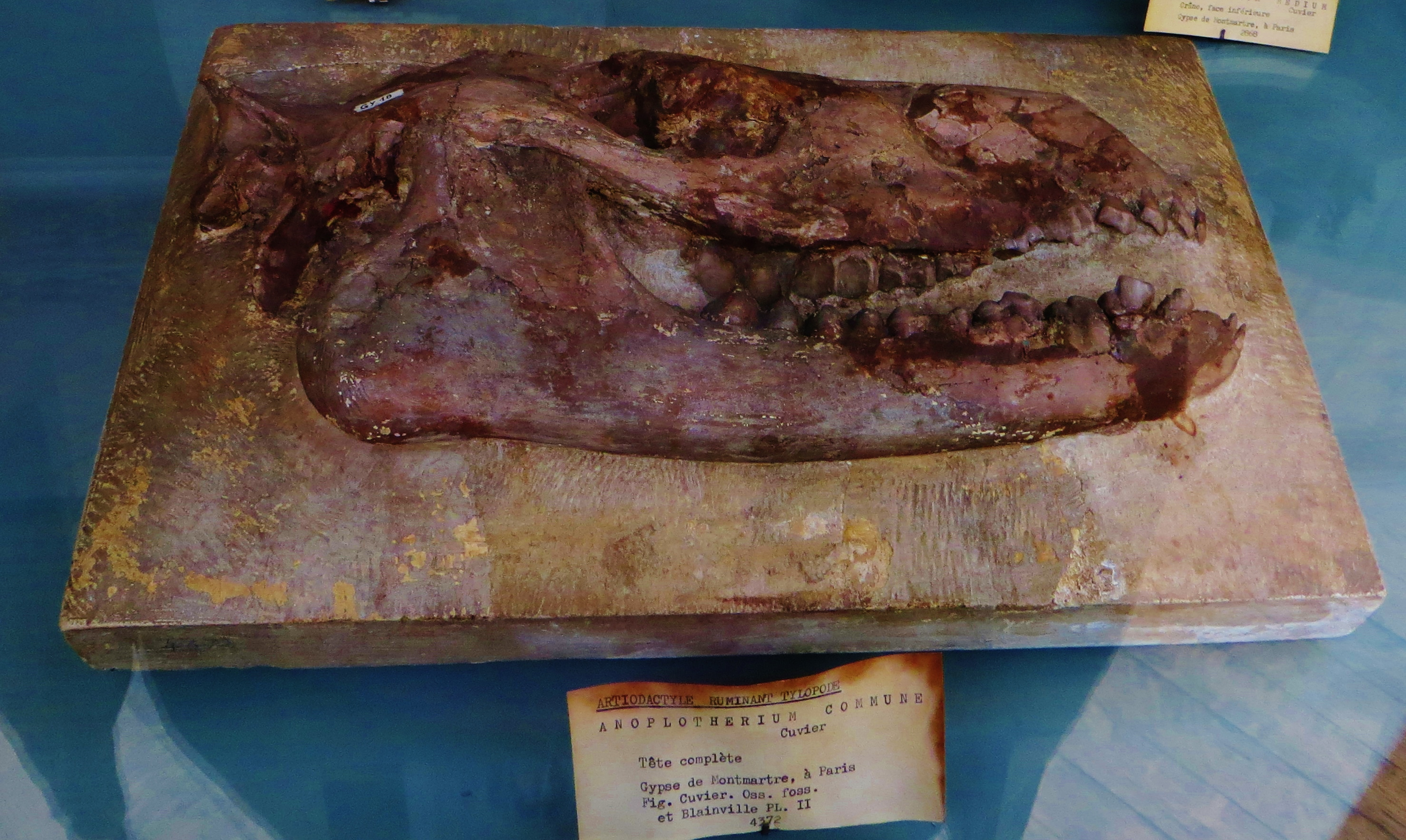
Anoplotherium commune skull, National Museum of Natural History, France

The research history of Anoplotherium spans back to 1804 when Georges Cuvier first described the fossils of this extinct artiodactyl and named the genus after describing Palaeotherium, making it one of the first fossil mammal genera to be described as well as having one of the earliest official taxonomic authorities. It was also amongst the first fossil genera to be reconstructed by drawings and biomechanics. Subsequent descriptions of fossil evidence by Cuvier are also said to have been some of the earliest instances of palaeoneurology and palaeopathology. Anoplotherium was a significant find in palaeontological history and was once an iconic element of text and classroom sources of palaeontology, geology, and natural history. Today, it has a lessened cultural status compared to the 19th century as a result of public interest in Mesozoic dinosaurs or Neogene-Quaternary mammals, but it is still regularly acknowledged in sources of the history of palaeontology.

Cuvier recognized four species of Anoplotherium the same year he first created the genus name, among them the type species A. commune. From 1807 to 1812, he described two skeletons of A. commune from the French communes of Pantin and Antony, noting the distinct lack of anatomical analogues among modern mammals and making a hypothesis based on its unique anatomy that it was semi-aquatic. The two other species he named in 1804, A. medium, A. minus, and A. minimum, had their paleobiologies speculated on in 1812 and had their names emended in 1822 to A. (Xiphodon) gracile, A. (Dichobune) leporinum, and A. murinus. The former two species' subgenera were converted into distinct genera in later decades while A. murinus was later assigned to its own genus Amphimeryx. Cuvier in 1822 also named two additional species A. secundaria and A. obliquum, later reassigned to newer genera Diplobune and, provisionally, Haplomeryx respectively.

Many species assigned to Anoplotherium were named in later decades and were then subsequently assigned to other genera by other works. Several other species that were also erected within Anoplotherium remain within the genus today, namely A. laurillardi, A. latipes, and A. pompeckji; as a result, four species of Anoplotherium are recognized. In addition, the hypothesis that Anoplotherium was semi-aquatic was proven incorrect by M. Dor in 1938 and replaced by another of facultative bipedalism by Jerry J. Hooker in 2007.

== Early Identification ==
=== First described remains ===
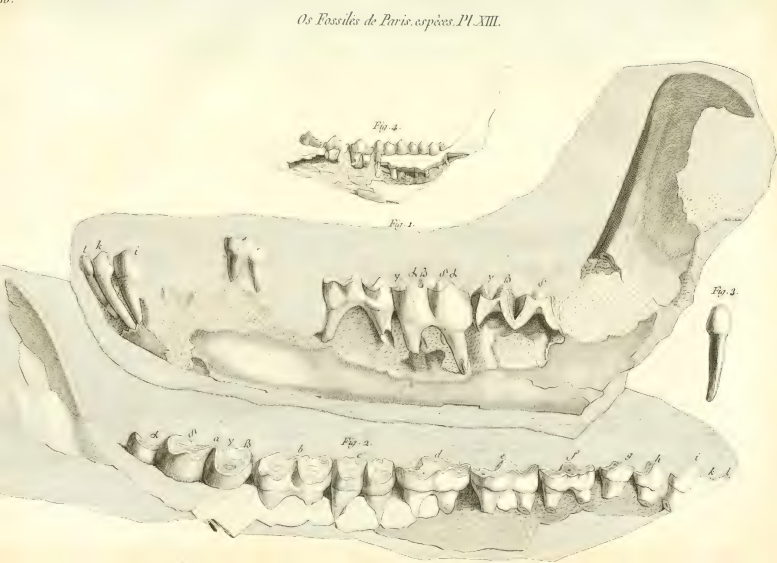
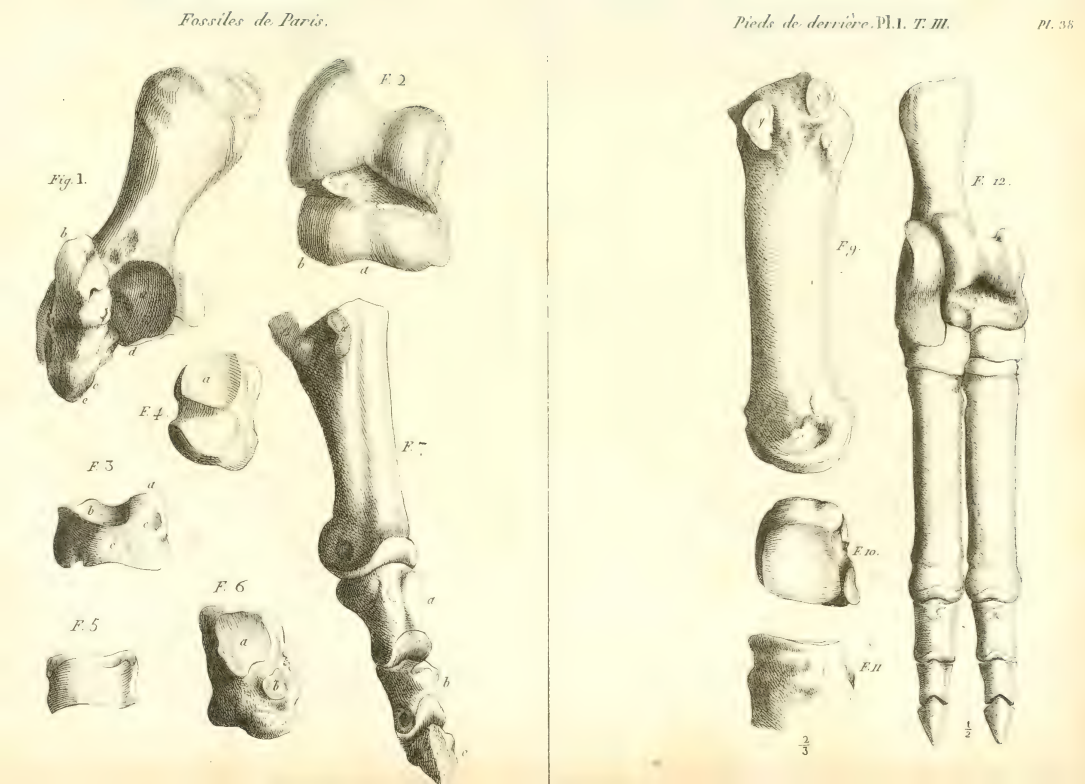
Sketches of dental, cranial, and limb remains of Anoplotherium commune by Georges Cuvier, 1804

In 1804, French naturalist Georges Cuvier wrote about a "remarkable" fossil mammal genus from the gypsum quarries of the outskirts of Paris (known as the Paris Basin), making comparisons of its fossils with those of Palaeotherium, which he had already described shortly before it. These fossils were known by Cuvier as early as 1800 but were not formally described yet. He described Anoplotherium as having tooth sizes similar to Palaeotherium that are otherwise different in form. He considered that the most important trait of the newer genus is the apparent lack of canines, leaving a large gap between the incisors and molars. (Note: In the modern day, premolars rather than molars are defined as coming immediately after the incisor-canine sequences.) The fossil specimen of the peculiar animal, Cuvier observed, contained nine teeth leading from the last three-pointed molar to the lateral incisors. To the zoologist, the distinct lack of canines was an unusual trait that few "pachyderms", namely rhinoceroses and hyraxes, had. The difference between the genus and certain "pachyderms," according to Cuvier, was that rhinos and hyraxes either had only four lower incisors total or lacked them while a hemimandible (half a mandible) specimen had three lower incisors. There was a lack of any upper jaw attributable to it, however, making its upper dental diagnoses unknown or only up to speculation at the time. Therefore, he erected the genus name Anoplotherium, basing the etymology on an apparent lack of "offensive" arms and canines by which characterized it. The genus name means "unarmed beast," for which the etymology is a compound of the Greek prefixes αν ('an') meaning 'not', ὅπλον ('hóplon') meaning 'armor, large shield' and the suffix θήρ ('thēr') meaning 'beast' or 'wild animal'.

Cuvier named three species of Anoplotherium in the same year, the first of which was the "sheep-sized" A. commune and the other three of which were "smaller species" that he named A. medium, A. minus, and A. minimum. The etymology of the species name A. commune refers to how "common" fossils of the species were while the etymologies of the other two species were based on sizes compared to A. commune. (Note: The French feminine noun "commune" (masculine form "commun") translates in English to "common.") He also attributed a cloven hoof (or didactyl hoof) to A. commune since the specimen appeared to be large-sized. The naturalist had great difficulty in distinguishing between Palaeotherium fossils and Anoplotherium fossils especially since he rejected that idea that the head's proportions automatically indicated limb proportions. However, he figured that the head Palaeotherium' was pig-sized and the similar to a tapir compared to that of Anoplotherium and that the tridactyl fossils belonged it. By contrast, Anoplotherium had all cloven hoof fossils attributed to it and was diagnosed in part by having incisors but no canines, which he thought makes it more similar to ruminants or camels. In 1805, Cuvier reinforced the idea of Anoplotherium having didactyl hooves, justifying that based on additional limb bone remains, it had two toes on its front legs and its hind legs.

=== Skeletal Discoveries ===
In 1807, Cuvier conducted another series of analyses on Anoplotherium. In comparing the unguals (toes) of the limbs of A. commune, he noticed that the two unguals of the hind foot, are more pointed and elongated than those of the front foot, although he did not know if age correlates in any way with elongations or bluntness of the unguals. He determined that Anoplotherium in terms of extant relatives must have been closest to camelids based on the shapes of the unguals, but he also mentioned that the shortness of the front two pairs of unguals are similar in proportions to the bluntness of the hind unguals of pigs compared to those of their front legs. In addition to the two large toes, A. commune appeared to also have a third index toe of smaller size.

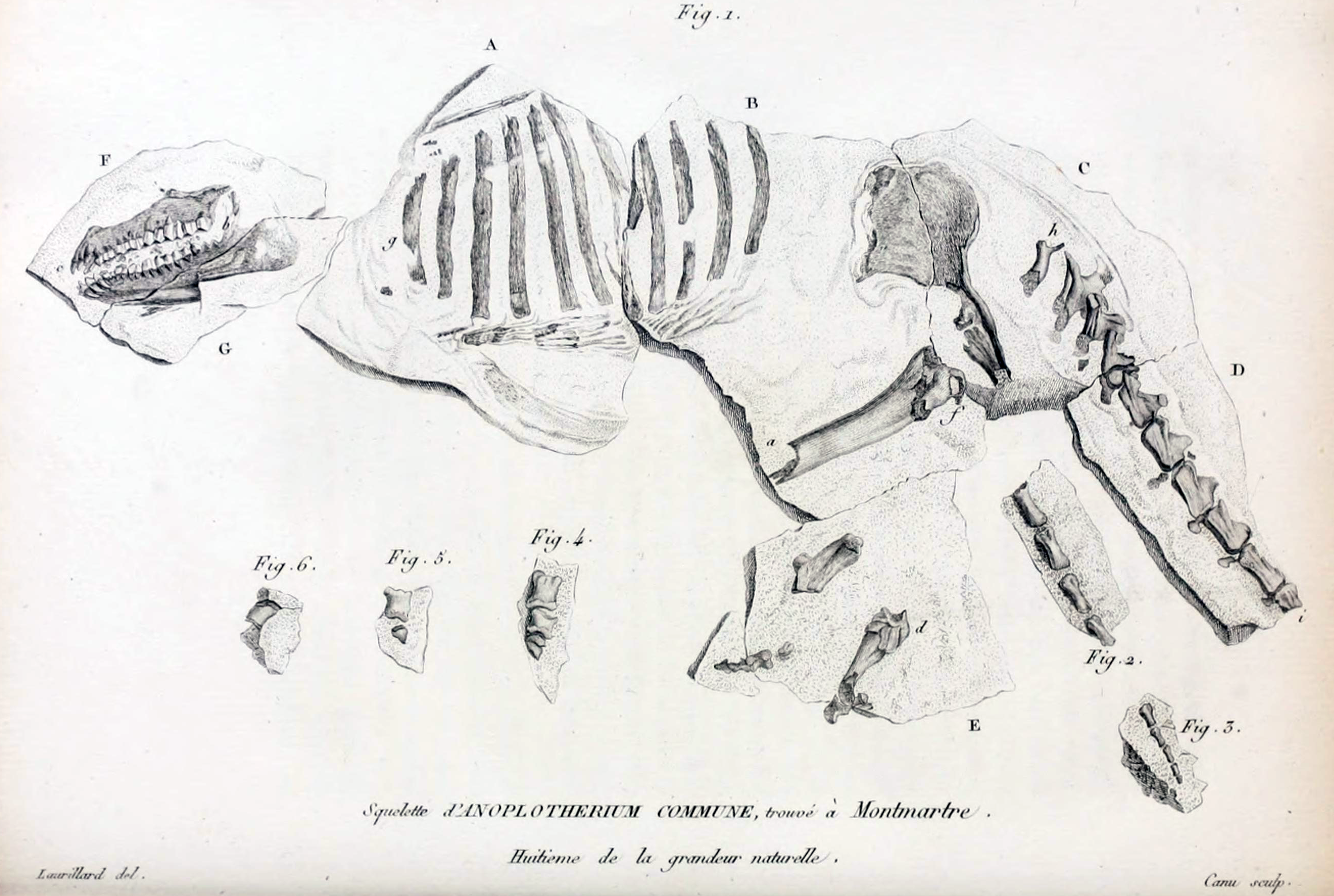
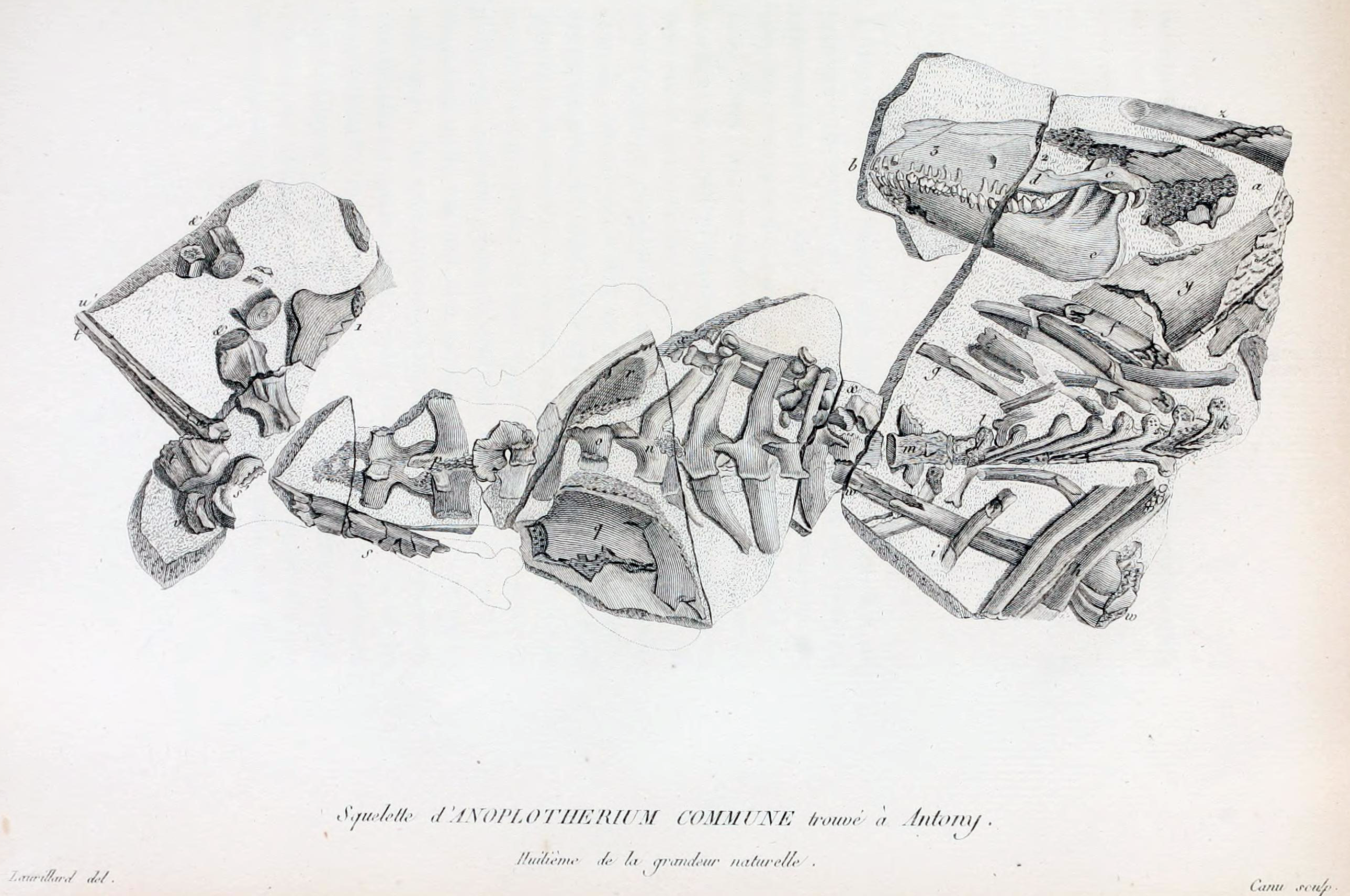
Sketches of two incomplete, embedded skeletons of Anoplotherium commune, found in the communes of Pantin (left skeleton) and Antony (right skeleton). Both were described by Georges Cuvier in 1807.

In the same year, he wrote about two incomplete skeletons found within communes nearby Paris. The first, found in the quarries of Montmartre in the commune of Pantin, had helped to confirm Cuvier's diagnoses of A. commune. The embedded skeleton, embedded in stone fragments was the size of a small horse and contained partial skull fragments (the parts connecting them to the body scattered, meaning that the workers did not collect them), scattered remains of a hind foot, a partial femur, ribs, a pelvis, and a large portion of the tail. The incomplete skeleton of A. commune confirmed the genus having large didactyl hind feet and 44 teeth in individuals total, 11 on each side of its jaw with an apparent lack of canine. There were also 11 complete ribs and a small fragment of a 12th rib, similar to camelids. Cuvier expressed his disappointment at how the neglect of the way the fossil was collected caused damage to it, frustrated that the vertebrae could not be fully examined as a result. The most surprising element of the skeleton to the naturalist was the enormous tail with at least twenty-two vertebrae, which he immediately recognized as having no modern analogue in any large quadrupedal mammal.

A second skeleton from Antony was described shortly after by Cuvier his preceding article of the first skeleton. The skeleton was removed more carefully by workers with supervision of experts but was still fragmentary and missing critical bone pieces needed for more thorough diagnoses. Still, he was able to count six lumbar vertebrae, the last four of which were long, wide, and slightly forward similar to those of ruminants and pigs. He also recalled three sacral vertebrae, all of which were extremely strong and were probably able to support large tails. Most notable to Cuvier was the confirmation that Anoplotherium had two large fingers and one small finger on its front legs.

== Early depictions ==
=== Cuvier's reconstruction ===
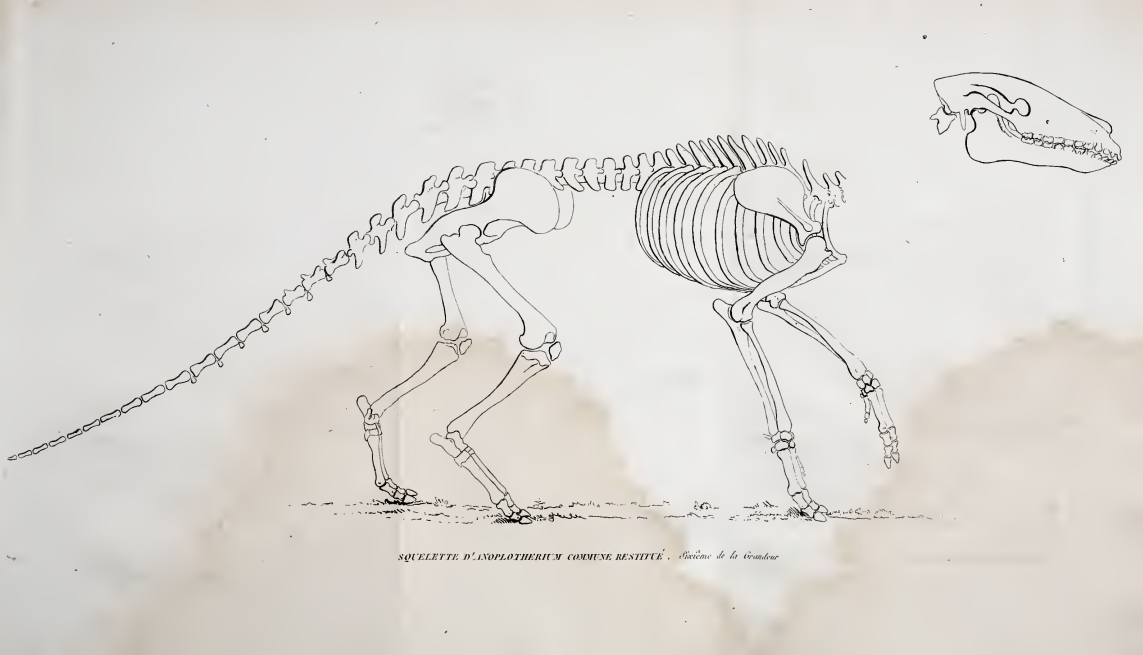
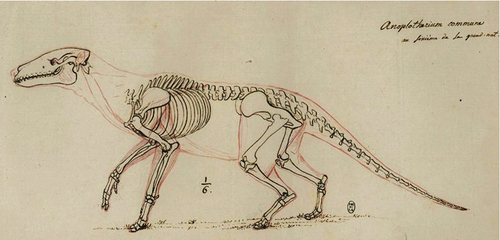
Georges Cuvier's published sketch (left) and unpublished sketch with outline (right) of an incomplete skeletal reconstruction of Anoplotherium commune, ~1812.

In 1812, Cuvier published his summary on his years of research on the two extinct genera that lived in modern-day France. Previously cautious about synthesizing information about the two taxa due to potential criticism, Cuvier had the good scientific reputation and information needed to publish his reconstructions of the fossil mammals based on synthesized information. Because of A. commune's robust build, short limbs, and enormous tail, he hypothesized that its body position, except for its legs, were similar to otters, that A. commune likely exhibited semi-aquatic swimming behaviors within marshy environments. According to Cuvier's theory, Anoplotherium was a herbivore that consumed aquatic plants and their roots, had sleek hair like otters or little to no hair like hippopotamuses, and did not have long ears that would have been counterproductive to its aquatic life. Therefore, Cuvier suggested that underwater quadrupeds like the hippo and water-adapted muroids are living analogues to it. In comparison, A. medium adopted a more terrestrial, cursorial lifestyle similar to gazelles or roe deer, grazing on plants or browsing on shrubs and traveling on marshes that A. commune lived in. It was thought to have short hair, a timid nature, and lack of rumination that modern ruminants have. A. minus was thought to be similar to A. medium but hare-sized. Of all species of Anoplotherium to be described and drawn, only A. commune remained accurate, the rest of the reconstructions being erroneous.

=== Crystal Palace Dinosaurs ===
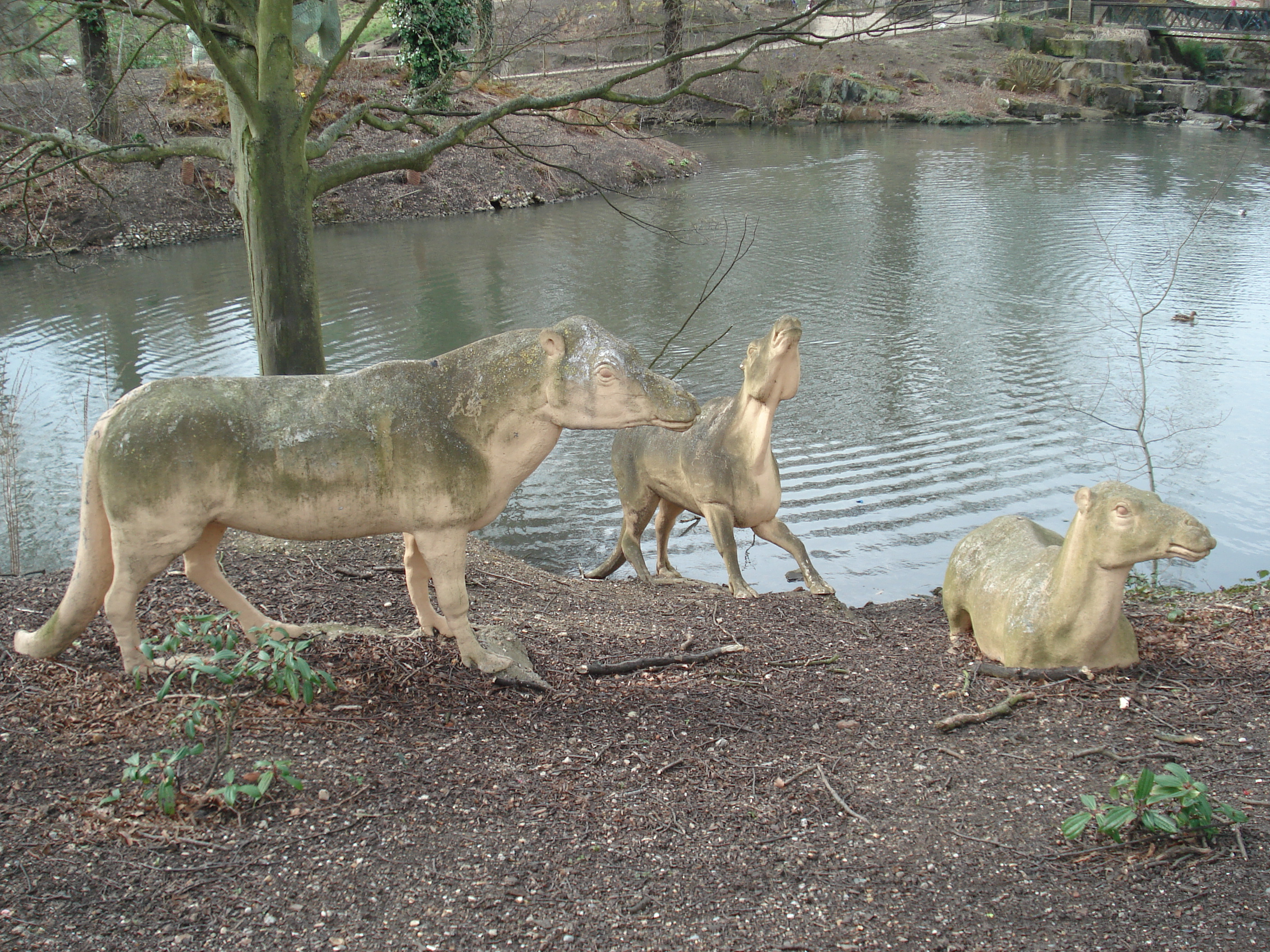
Sculptures of an Anoplotherium commune herd as part of the Crystal Palace Dinosaurs sculptures on the Tertiary Island of the Crystal Palace Park, United Kingdom

A. commune is particularly well-known for being represented as 3 "Tertiary Island" sculptures of the famous Crystal Palace Dinosaurs attraction in the Crystal Palace Park in the United Kingdom, being the last mammals that could be seen based on their positions being closest to the "Secondary Island." However, there are some confusions of the "species" of Anoplotherium that is represented, which is the result of the Crystal Palace guides of the 1850s-1860s listing both A. commune and "A. gracile" (= Xiphodon gracilis) as being present on the Tertiary Island. It was originally proposed by multiple sources in the 1990s that within the herd of Anoplotherium, the two standing statues represent A. commune while the third statue that is in a reposed position represents "A. gracile". In 2022, however, authors Mark Witton and Elinor Michel argued that there are no anatomical differences between the three A. commune statues, and A. commune was always known to have largely differentiated anatomically from "A. gracile." They instead pointed out that the Megaloceros "fawn" was in fact an "A. gracile" individual, the three other individuals being lost in time.

The three statues of A. commune, located along the banks of the Tidal Lake, are large (3.6 m (12 ft) long) and resemble hybrids of deer and big cats. The genus is considered perhaps the most obscure of all Crystal Palace Dinosaur genera to visitors of the modern day but are well-known to palaeontological or 1800s palaeoart specialists. Anoplotherium was once an iconic component of palaeontology, geology, and natural history, being incorporated regularly in both palaeontological texts and within classrooms (mineralogists and science professors of the National Museum of Natural History, France Claude-Henri Gorceix and Alfred Des Cloizeaux considered an Anoplotherium head to be amongst the few palaeontological items of "utmost importance"). Public interest in Anoplotherium decreased in the turn of the 20th century when more extraordinary prehistoric animals were described.

The reconstructions of Anoplotherium and Palaeotherium were both closely tied to the English sculptor Benjamin Waterhouse Hawkins' careful works in following Cuvier's descriptions on the genera based on known remains. The design of Anoplotherium reflects Cuvier's restoration of A. commune as semi-aquatic and with little to no hair. The robust muscles shown on the sculptures seemingly reflect Cuvier's reprinted but unpublished studies that speculated on the muscles of the species, which today is seen as accurate and having paved the way for palaeoart and biomechanics of prehistoric animals.

There are several differences between Hawkin's rendition of A. commune and Cuvier's descriptions, however. Hawkins' portrayals of Anoplotherium differed by the inclusion of camel-like features such as large lips, small and rounded ears, and a sloping skull roof, suggesting that Hawkins followed later mammal classifications that placed it as having closer affinities to camelids (and other tylopods). The sloping skull roof contradicted the true shape of the skull of A. commune. Cuvier in comparison speculated that Anoplotherium had a lower snout and modest lip tissues. Therefore, Hawkins followed the anatomies of extant animals for reconstructing the artiodactyl while Cuvier more correctly reconstructed it based on fossil bones. Additionally, Hawkin incorrectly reconstructed the limbs of Anoplotherium as having four toes on each foot instead of three toes (two hoofed digit toes and one thumblike toe on each), which Witton and Michel thought might be the result of Hawkins thinking that the fossils were incomplete based on inconsistencies with toe numbers for artiodactyls. Other than these issues, Witton and Michel thought that the statues aged well with modern anatomies for Anoplotherium despite dramatically different palaeobiologies of Anoplotherium in modern-day research.

== Origins of palaeontological subfields ==
=== Palaeoneurology ===
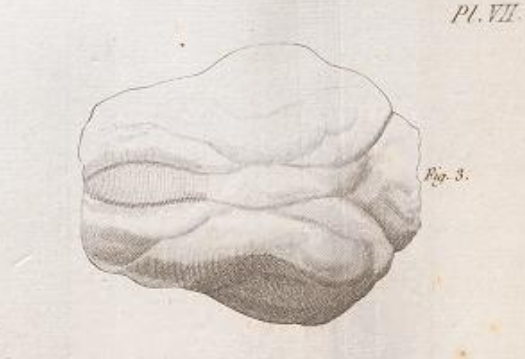
Anoplotherium cerebral hemisphere endocast illustration by Georges Cuvier, 1822. Its first mention in 1804 marks the origins of palaeoneurology.

The palaeontological history of Anoplotherium in the context of the endocast (or fossilized brain case) started as early as 1804 when Cuvier studied a naturally fossilized brain case of A. commune from a broken skull from Montmartre (although he identified the brain case as belonging to Palaeotherium medium until 1822). More specifically, the brain-case represents the cerebral hemisphere. Cuvier realized that the brain cast of the prehistoric species could be informative regarding their brain anatomies, making this the earliest known instance of palaeoneurology.

The first definition of a natural endocast was by Cuvier in 1822 when describing the brain cast of A. commune, in which he said that the brain cast was moulded from clay on the brain within the cranial cavity of the skull, that it truly represented the shape of the brain. However, Cuvier incorporated bias of evolutionary superiority in his research, where he concluded in 1822 that because of the small size of the endocast that was horizontally flattened and lacked visible convolutions (or folds or wrinkles) of the brain, Anoplotherium was "devoid of intelligence." Today, brain sizes are no longer thought to automatically correlate with intelligence or evolutionary survival.

=== Palaeopathology ===
Cuvier's palaeontological works are also thought to have been early instances of palaeopathology. This was first brought up by American geologist Roy Lee Moodie in 1917, who argued that Cuvier's descriptions of a healed fractured skull of Pleistocene Hyaena and a healed fractured femur of Anoplotherium in the 1820s were part of the early history of the field but were inadequate in discussions regarding the connection of the fossils with interpreting health/disease. How the individual Anoplotherium was injured and eventually healed was not studied by Cuvier and remains unknown. Cuvier's recognition of the fractured fossils is agreed by many late 20th-century and 21st-century palaeopathologists to be part of the early history of palaeopathology.

== Early taxonomic complications ==
=== Other Eocene artiodactyls ===
The taxonomic status of Anoplotherium in the 19th century was complicated by misattributions of other artiodactyl or perissodactyl fossils similar to it that were later found to belong to different genera. In 1822, Cuvier recognized five total species of Anoplotherium besides A. commune: A. gracile (emended from A. medium), A. murinum (emended from A. minimum), A. obliquum, A. leporinum (emended from A. minus), and A. secundaria. For the first species, he noticed differences in the dentition of the molars and introduced the subgenus name Xiphodon while in the second to fourth he erected another subgenus named Dichobune based on its small size comparable to a hare. By 1848, however, Auguste Pomel promoted the two subgenera to genus ranks, making them distinct from Anoplotherium. In addition, he also erected the genus Amphimeryx for the species A. murinus and A. obliquus. This was followed immediately by subsequent palaeontologists such as Paul Gervais. Additionally, by 1885, A. minus as originally erected by Cuvier was listed by Richard Lydekker as a synonym of D. leporina. In 1910, Swiss palaeontologist Hans Georg Stehlin tentatively reclassified "A." obliquum to Haplomeryx.

=== Cainotheres ===
In 1833, naturalist Étienne Geoffroy Saint-Hilaire listed the newer-described species A. laticurvatum based on the different cranial morphologies compared to other Anoplotherium species. He considered that the species should probably be in a separate subgenus within Anoplotherium because of the more significant differences. The species would be reclassified in 1851 to Cainotherium by palaeontologist Auguste Pomel, although it went through several species synonyms until the species C. laticurvatum took priority.

=== Chalicotheres ===
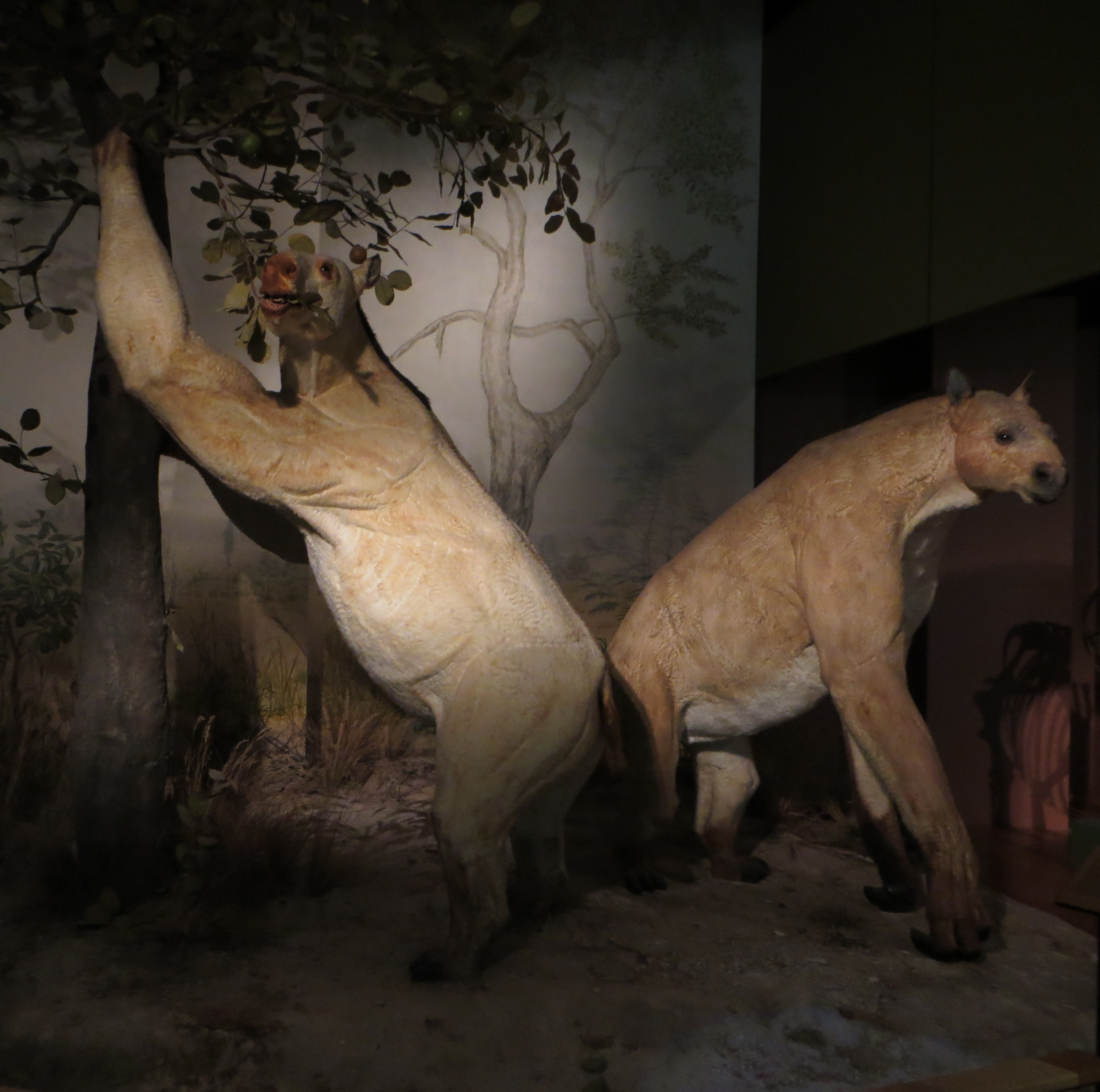
Anisodon grande models, Natural History Museum of Basel. Because the taxonomies of chalicotheres were not yet well-established, they were often confused with anoplotheres for much of the early 19th century.

The early 19th century also saw confusions between anoplotheriids and chalicotheres as a result of similar traits that caused palaeontologists at the time to mistake the two families as being of close affinities. In 1837, Édouard Lartet noted that he found remains of a large Anoplotherium from the French fossil deposit of Sansan without formally describing the species. In 1839, Lartet applied the name A. magnum towards dental remains found at the site, eventually referred to subjectively as a nomen nudum (the postcranial remains were assigned to the genus name Macrotherium, which has since been a definite nomen nudum). The taxonomic history of the chalicothere in the 19th century is highly complicated, but eventually, Anisodon grande became the authority name of the Miocene perissodactyl.

Likewise, in the same year that "Anoplotherium" was first described in Sansan, English palaeontologists Proby Cautley and Hugh Falconer described briefly a different fossil species from the Indian subcontinent based on two upper jaws with complete molar sets, erecting the name A sivalense and determining that it was somewhat larger than A. commune of the Paris Basin. Later by 1843, the two palaeontologists, although continuing to refer to the species as Anoplotherium sivalense, recognized that it was different in form from A. commune and Chalicotherium goldfussi that they considered it an "intermediate" form that was most closely allied to C. goldfussi. They also referred to A. posterogenium, a provisional name with no formal diagnosis from 1835, as a synonym to A. sivalense. In 1859, Johann Jakob Kaup created the genus Nestoritherium for the Indian subcontinental chalicothere species, effectively making both A. sivalense and C. sivalense synonyms, although it took until 1935 for the genus name to fully become the authority name.

=== Litopterns ===
In 1858, French geographer Victor Martin de Moussy listed in his monography the species Anoplotherium americanum from the Paraná beds of Argentina, which he knew was mainly Miocene in age but thought that it also contained Eocene-aged fossils. For a long time, naturalists like Charles Lyell and Charles Darwin were unable to explain the apparent occurrences of Palaeotherium and Anoplotherium in a continent that was far from Europe. Eventually in 1886, Argentine naturalist Florentino Ameghino revised Palaeotherium paranense and Anoplotherium americanum to Scalabrinitherium and Proterotherium respectively, both of which compose part of the extinct endemic South American order Litopterna.

== Revisions of the anoplotheriids ==
In 1851, Pomel wrote about his observations of Anoplotherium, judging that true Anoplotherium species can be distinguished as didactyl types or by tridactyl types where greater developments of the third fingers (indexes) occur. The only previously described species Pomel recognized as valid were A. commune and A. secundaria. In addition, he made new species of Anoplotherium, the first of which was A. platypus, which he said was roughly the size of A. commune. The second was A. laurillardi which was defined in part by convex incisors on the anterior surface. A. laurillardi derives as a species name from the French palaeontologist Charles Léopold Laurillard. The third species A. cuvieri was determined by the shape of a metatarsal. The fourth species A. devernoy was erected based on illustrations of Anoplotherium cranial remains by Cuvier, basing the species off of apparent smaller sizes and incisors of different shapes.

In 1852, Gervais created the genus Eurytherium, for which he made E. latipis the type species. He argued that it was most closely related to Anoplotherium but was distinct from it by its presence of three fingers instead of two. Gervais also determined that A. latipis, based on its three-toed foot trait, is undoubtedly the same species as the earlier-named A. platypus. He also considered that although differences between Anoplotherium species were mainly diagnosed by postcranial differences, dental differences could play roles in distinguishing them as well. In 1870, Filhol erected E. quercyi and E. minus based on dental sizes of the specimens and reclassified A. secundarium to Eurytherium.

In 1862, Ludwig Rütimeyer erected the subgenus Diplobune for the genus Dichobune because he thought that Diplobune was a transitional form between Anoplotherium secundarium and later forms of Dichobune. Diplobune soon became recognized as a genus with one species D. bavaricum being attributed to it by Oscar Fraas in 1870.

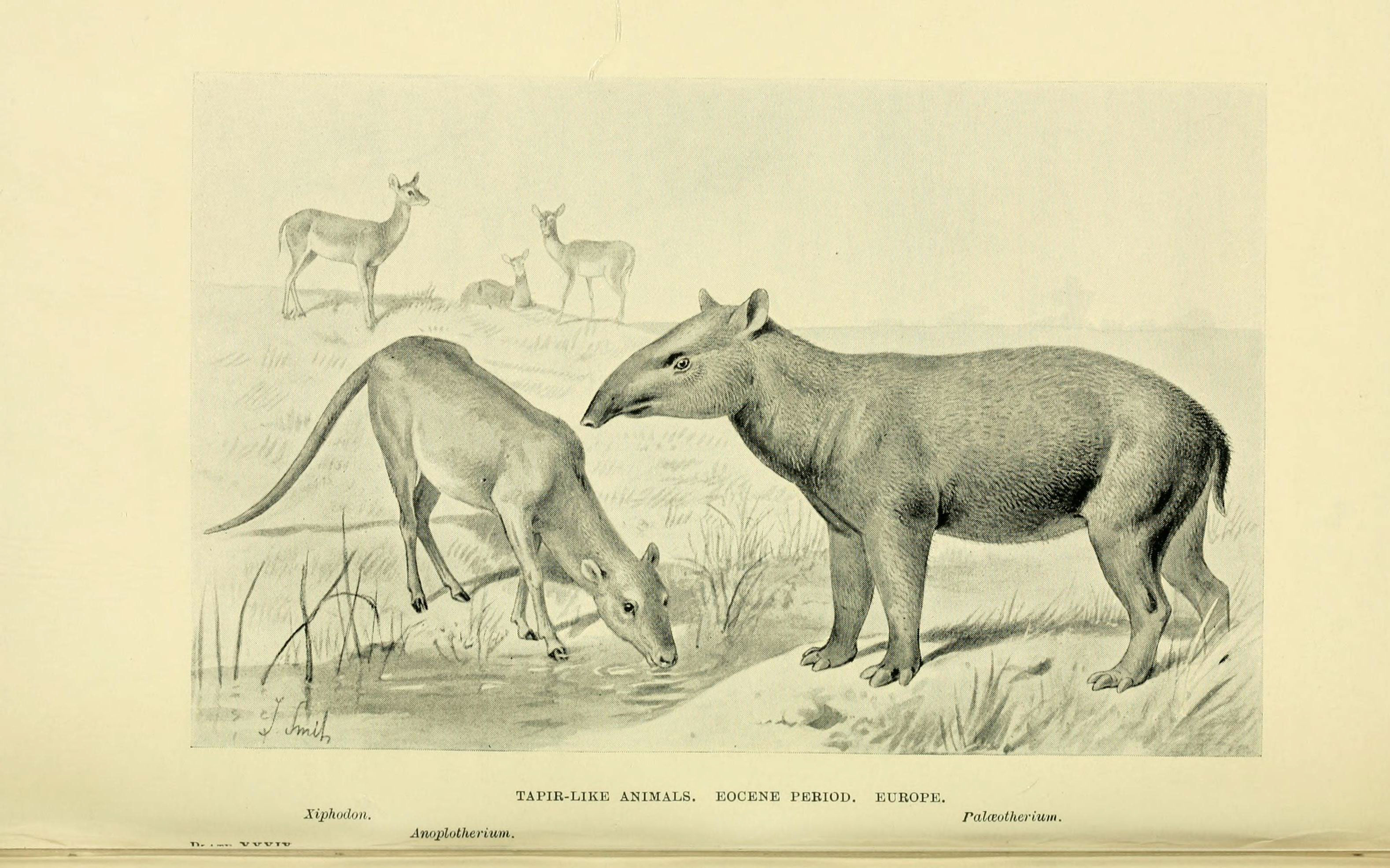
Illustrations of Anoplotherium (foreground left), Xiphodon (background left), and Palaeotherium (right) in the 1910 book "Extinct monsters and creatures of other days."

A. latipes as a taxon had gone through a complicated history as a result of naming priority conflicts within the field of taxonomy. In 1883, Max Sclosser explained that Eurytherium was a synonym of Anoplotherium because the former's limb and dental anatomies show at most specific differences rather than major differences. He argued that A. commune had three toes and three fingers at its feet even though its third fingers/toes were not as well-developed, making it tridactyl just like E. latipes. He also stated that "A. platypus" as erected by Pomel in 1851 is a synonym of A. latipes. He also added that A. cuvieri was one of the dubious species previously created by Filhol-based only on isolated metatarsals. In addition, he mentioned being unsure about Pomel attempting to separate A. duvmoyi from A. commune, as he said that while Paris materials need revisions, attempting to do so out of illustrations would be useless. The palaeontologist considered that A. secundaria should be renamed to Diplobune secundaria based on dentition and smaller sizes. Schlosser also synonymized A. tridactylum, initially erected by Vladimir Kovalevsky in 1873, with A. latipes because the latter name takes priority. Palaeontologist Jerry J. Hooker explained in 2007 that the reason the species name (not the genus name) E. latipes takes priority over A. platypus was that Pomel did not list any specimen to his species A. platypus in 1851, making the name a nomen dubium.

Diplobune was considered a synonym of Anoplotherium by Lydekker in 1885, the former's attributed species being reclassified to Anoplotherium in the process, meaning that the species A. secundarium, A. quercyi, A. modicum, A. bavaricum, and A. minus (Filhol) were added under the latter genus. A. latipes was reclassified as a synonym of A. commune while A. laurillardi was considered a potential synonym of A. secundarium. In addition, Lydekker created the newer species A. cayluxense based on its smaller size compared to other attributed Anoplotherium species and more unique variations in the cusps of the molars. The demotion of the genus name Diplobune was not supported in later research papers, however, as Stehlin argued that Diplobune was generically distinct enough from Anoplotherium, thus making D. quercyi, D. bavarica (D. modica became a synonym of the species), and D. minor species of the former again. A. secundarium was previously always a species of Anoplotherium but was relocated into Diplobune as D. secundaria. Stehlin also determined that A. cayluxense was a synonym of D. secundaria. He also reviewed the rest of the Anoplotherium species after the revisions, thus supporting the validity of 3 species: A. commune, A. latipes, and A. laurillardi.

In 1922, Wilhelm Otto Dietrich erected the fourth species A. pompeckji from the locality of Mähringen in Germany, named in honor of German palaeontologist Josef Felix Pompeckj. The species was described as a medium-sized tridactyl species with 4-fingered front limbs and 3-toed hind limbs with slimmer hand bone proportions and a smaller astragalus. A. pompeckji is the least characterized species and has similar dentition to A. laurillardi, making its status less certain compared to the three other species.

== Modern palaeobiology ==
For much of the history of palaeontology, the perception that Anoplotherium was a semi-aquatic artiodactyl persisted since Cuvier's 1812 palaeobiological descriptions of it. In the 1850s, Gervais elaborated on the idea of three-toed anoplotheriids being aquatic while describing "Eurytherium" latipes (= Anoplotherium latipes), thinking that it had webbed feet and was more aquatic than A. commune. This was supported by Gervais as late as 1883.

It took more than a century for the idea that Anoplotherium was aquatic to be corrected. In 1938, M. Dor discussed this perception based on its three-toed limbs, flattened head shape, short limbs, and long tail, expressing his surprise that Cuvier was the one who created the aquatic Anoplotherium theory. Dor argued that Cuvier assumed that the caudal muscles of the tail were well-developed based on the large dimensions of the caudal vertebrae and processes (outgrowths of anatomical tissues of the body), causing him to relate it to tails of kangaroos and otters. However, the researcher pointed that the resemblance of the tail occurs only in its first part which is well-connected to the body. Dor emphasized that while the tail of otters and kangaroos play large roles in their locomotions, the tail muscles are normally weaker in ungulates and play limited roles in locomotion. Additionally, the legs of Anoplotherium were proposed to be closer to ruminants or suids than hippopotamuses, which were not true swimmers. Additionally, Anoplotherium lacked adaptations to aquatic/semi-aquatic life based on a narrow face, low eyes based on the low positions of the orbit, and horizontal, low ear canals.

In 2007, Hooker overall agreed with Dor's observations but disagreed with the observations of the tail, explaining that although the distal caudal vertebrae of Anoplotherium are less prominent than those of kangaroos (Macropus), the vertebrae patterns of Anoplotherium are more similar to Macropus than ungulates like Bos or Equus. He stated that Anoplotherium likely was a bipedal browsing herbivore, meaning that it could have stood upright on its two hind legs to eat higher plants.
