= Chemositia =

Chemositia Temporal range: Late Miocene

Scientific classification
- Kingdom: Animalia
- Phylum: Chordata
- Class: Mammalia
- Order: Perissodactyla
- Family: †Chalicotheriidae
- Subfamily: †Schizotheriinae
- Genus: †Chemositia; Pickford, 1979
- Species: †C. tugenensis

Binomial name
- †Chemositia tugenensis Pickford, 1979

Extinct genus of chalicothere

Chemositia is an extinct genus of chalicothere, a group of herbivorous, odd-toed ungulate (perissodactyl) mammals. They lived in Africa, and had claws that were likely used in a hook-like manner to pull down branches, suggesting they lived as bipedal browsers.

Many authorities do not believe that Chemositia is a valid genus and synonymize it with Ancylotherium or Metaschizotherium.

== Sources ==
- Classification of Mammals by Malcolm C. McKenna and Susan K. Bell
