= Litolophus =

Scientific classification
- Kingdom: Animalia
- Phylum: Chordata
- Class: Mammalia
- Infraclass: Placentalia
- Order: Perissodactyla
- Family: †Eomoropidae
- Genus: †Litolophus; Radinsky, 1964

Extinct genus of mammals

Litolophus is an extinct genus of odd-toed ungulate in the superfamily Chalicotherioidea.

Litholophus is considered to be a basal member of its group, as the known remains of its skeleton have more similarities with those of basal representatives of other perrisodactyl groups than with more typical members of the family chalicotheridae (such as Chalicotherium). Its feet ended in hooves (rather than sharp claws as in Chalicotherium).
