= Eomoropidae =

Eomoropidae Temporal range: 46.2–33.9 Ma Mid to Late Eocene

Scientific classification
- Kingdom: Animalia
- Phylum: Chordata
- Class: Mammalia
- Order: Perissodactyla
- Suborder: †Ancylopoda
- Superfamily: †Chalicotherioidea
- Family: †Eomoropidae; Matthew, 1929

Genera
- †Eomoropus †Grangeria †Litolophus †Lunania †Paleomoropus

Extinct family of odd-toed ungulates

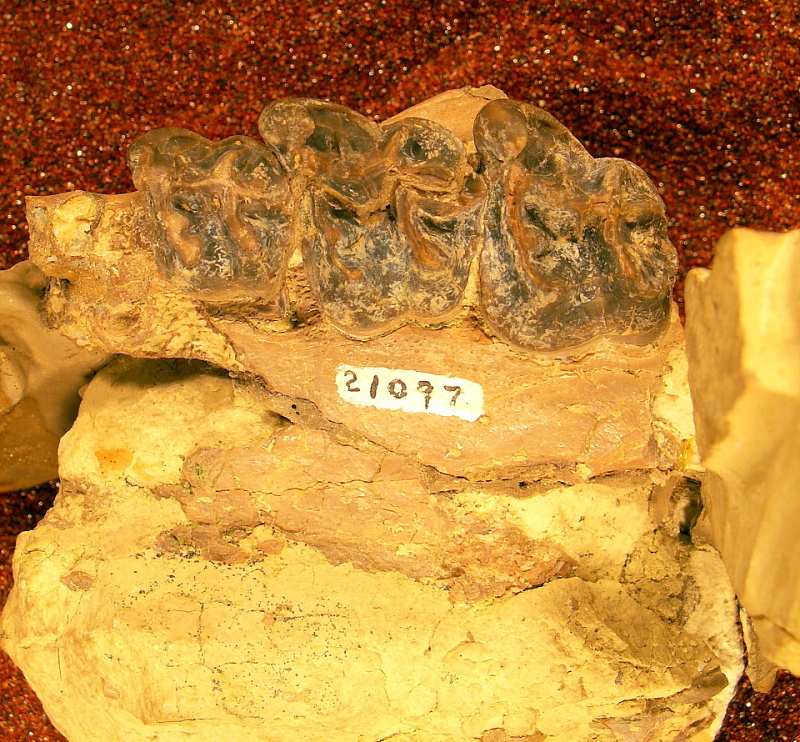
Eomoropus anarsius

Eomoropidae is a family of odd-toed ungulates, a group which also includes horses, rhinoceroses, and tapirs. They were most closely related to the extinct chalicotheres, which they greatly resemble, and may have been their immediate ancestors. They were, however, much smaller than the later forms, being around the size of a sheep. Like their later relatives, they were probably browsers on leaves and other soft vegetation, and, unlike most other ungulates, had claws on their feet. The Eomoropidae is most likely a paraphyletic group within Chalicotherioidea.
