= M. matthewi =

M. matthewi may refer to:

- Mammut matthewi, an extinct mastodon species
- Moropus matthewi, an extinct mammal species endemic to North America during the Miocene

== See also ==
- Matthewi
