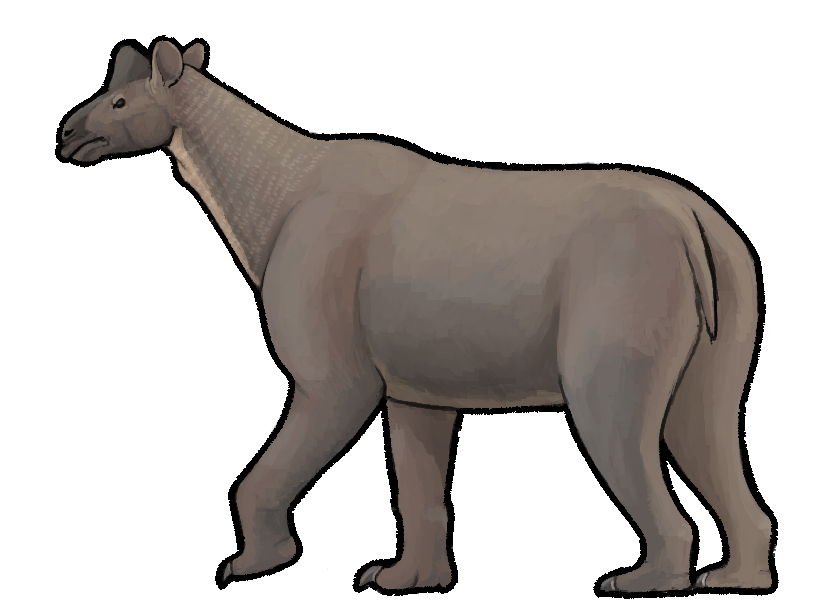
- Life restoration

Scientific classification
- Kingdom: Animalia
- Phylum: Chordata
- Class: Mammalia
- Order: Perissodactyla
- Family: †Chalicotheriidae
- Subfamily: †Schizotheriinae
- Genus: †Tylocephalonyx; Coombs, 1979
- Species: †T. skinneri

Binomial name
- †Tylocephalonyx skinneri Coombs, 1979

= Tylocephalonyx =

Tylocephalonyx Temporal range: Miocene, 15.97–13.6 Ma

Extinct genus of chalicothere

Tylocephalonyx is an extinct schizotherine chalicothere from the Miocene of North America.

== Description ==
Tylocephalonyx specimens are notable for a dome-shaped skull, a feature found in some other schizotheriine chalicotheres but most developed in this genus. Adequate fossil material is lacking to tell whether both sexes had domed heads, but sexual dimorphism was common in the group. Tylocephalonyx may have used its "dome" in the same way as the pachycephalosaurs, though there is no clear evidence to link either pachycephalosaurs nor Tylocephalonyx to using their domes to crash together in high-impact head-to-head contests, as in modern bighorn sheep. Such contests require special cranial adaptations to protect the brain and cervical spine, not shown in chalicotheres. The dome of Tylocephalonyx may have been used for visual display or in butting or head-to-body battering contests.

== Palaeoecology ==
The single species, T. skinneri, is found in northwest North America (full specimens from the Sheep Creek formation in Nebraska and the Split Rock fauna in Wyoming, with partial material from Oregon, Montana, Utah, and Colorado). Associations with other plants and animals suggest it lived in wet temperate forests, with a mix of hardwoods and conifers and abundant year-round rainfall. Moropus, the other major contemporary genus of large North American schizotherine chalicotheres, does not appear in these environments. Its remains are found in more open woodlands where Tylocephalonyx is not found, which suggests niche partitioning between the two genera. Tylocephalonyx fossils do extend into the Great Plains, so it has been suggested they browsed along riparian forest corridors, while Moropus inhabited uplands. As with many schizotherines, skeletal features suggest Tylocephalonyx walked normally for an ungulate but was also able to rear on its hind legs as modern goats do, use the front claws to pull tree branches down within reach, and gather leaves with an elongated tongue. According to dental microwear patterns, which are characterised by low numbers of unimodal scratches, Tylocephalonyx skinneri was a folivorous browser.

It may have specialized in high browsing, similar to the modern okapi, using a large body size and prehensile tongue, and substituting clawed forefeet for a long neck, in order to reach leaves higher in the forest canopy. High browsing allows herbivores to eat more leaf mass per bite, and to avoid competition with smaller herbivores for young shoots, which typically have higher nutritional value than mature leaves.

== See also ==
- Moropus
- Chalicotherium
- Ancylotherium
- Kalimantsia

== Sources ==
- National Geographic Prehistoric Mammals (National Geographic) by Alan Turner
- After the Dinosaurs: The Age of Mammals (Life of the Past) by Donald R. Prothero
- Classification of Mammals by Malcolm C. McKenna and Susan K. Bell
- Late Cretaceous and Cenozoic Mammals of North America: Biostratigraphy and Geochronology by Michael O. Woodburne
- Colbert's Evolution of the Vertebrates: A History of the Backboned Animals Through Time by Edwin H. Colbert, Michael Morales, and Eli C. Minkoff
- Coombs, Margery C. (1979). "Tylocephalonyx, a new genus of North American dome-skulled chalicotheres (Mammalia, Perissodactyla)". Bulletin of the AMNH. 164 (article 1). American Museum of Natural History: 1–64. hdl:2246/1041.
