= Metaschizotherium =

Metaschizotherium Temporal range: Early - Mid Miocene

Scientific classification
- Kingdom: Animalia
- Phylum: Chordata
- Class: Mammalia
- Order: Perissodactyla
- Family: †Chalicotheriidae
- Subfamily: †Schizotheriinae
- Genus: †Metaschizotherium von Koenigswald, 1932

Type species
- †Metaschizotherium fraasi Marsh, 1877

Species
- M. bavaricum von Koenigswald 1932; M. fraasi; M. wetzleri Kowalewsky 1873

Extinct genus of chalicothere

Metaschizotherium is an extinct genus that belongs to the family Chalicotheriidae, which was a group of herbivorous perissodactyl ("odd-toed") mammals. Though found primarily in Europe, fragmentary remains suggest that their range extended into Asia.

Several other species have been described under Metaschizotherium in the past, including the African M. transvaalensis, but they have been transferred to other genera, such as Ancylotherium. The entire genus has been considered synonymous with Ancylotherium in the past, but nowadays the two are generally found to be distinct.

This genus is typically associated with areas of closed, moist forest, where it fed on relatively soft leaves and shoots compared to a more abrasive diet of twigs and bark.

== See also ==
- Moropus
- Ancylotherium
