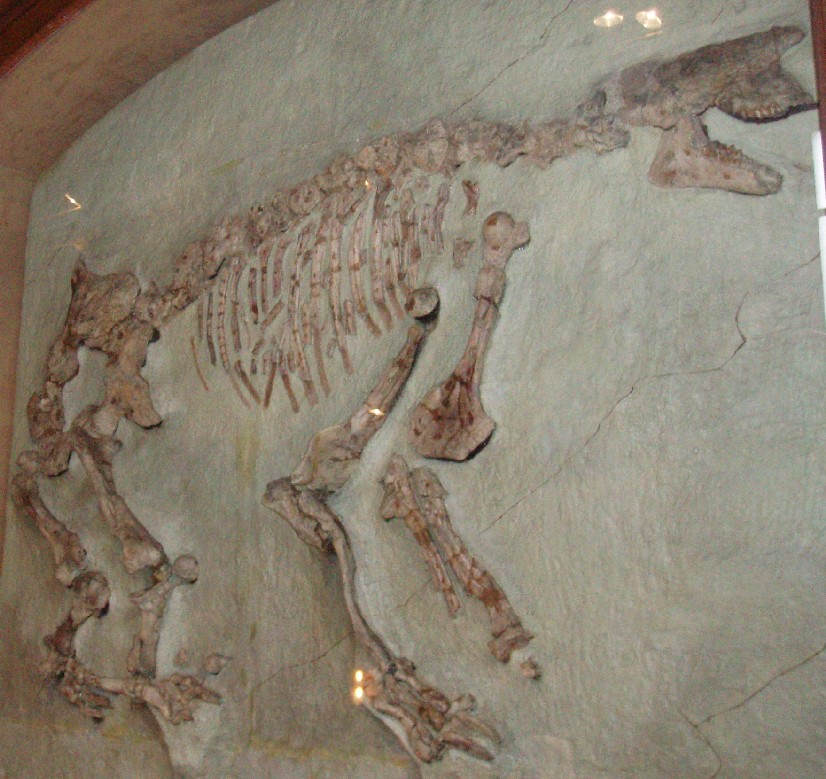

Scientific classification
- Kingdom: Animalia
- Phylum: Chordata
- Class: Mammalia
- Order: Perissodactyla
- Clade: Tapiromorpha
- Suborder: †Ancylopoda

Superfamilies
- Chalicotherioidea; Lophiodontidae

= Ancylopoda =

Ancylopoda Temporal range: Eocene–Middle Pleistocene

Extinct suborder of mammals

Ancylopoda is a group of browsing, herbivorous, mammals in the Perissodactyla that show long, curved and cleft claws. Morphological evidence indicates the Ancylopoda diverged from the tapirs, rhinoceroses and horses (Euperissodactyla) after the Brontotheria; however, earlier authorities such as Osborn sometimes considered the Ancylopoda to be outside Perissodactyla or, as was popular more recently, to be related to Brontotheriidae.

Macrotherium, which is typically from the middle Miocene of Sansan, in Gers, France, may indicate a distinct genus. Limb-bones resembling those of Macrotherium, but relatively stouter, have been described from the Pliocene beds of Attica and Samos as Ancylotherium. In the Americas, the names Morothorium and Moropus have been applied to similar bones, in the belief that they indicated xenarthrans. Macrotherium magnum must have been an animal of about 9 ft (2.7 m) in length.
