= Iriritherium =

Iriritherium Temporal range: Early Miocene

Scientific classification
- Kingdom: Animalia
- Phylum: Chordata
- Class: Mammalia
- Order: Perissodactyla
- Family: †Chalicotheriidae
- Subfamily: †Chalicotheriinae
- Genus: †Iriritherium
- Species: †I. pyroclasticum

Binomial name
- †Iriritherium pyroclasticum Pickford, 2020

Extinct genus of chalicotheriine chalicotheriid

Iriritherium is an extinct genus of chalicotheriine chalicotheriid that lived in Africa during the Miocene epoch.

Iriritherium pyroclasticum is known from the fossil site of Napak in Uganda, which has been dated to the Early Miocene.
