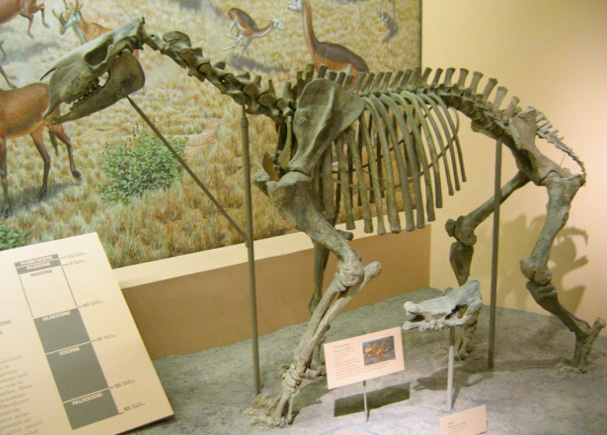
- Moropus elatus (Schizotheriinae) at the National Museum of Natural History, Washington, DC
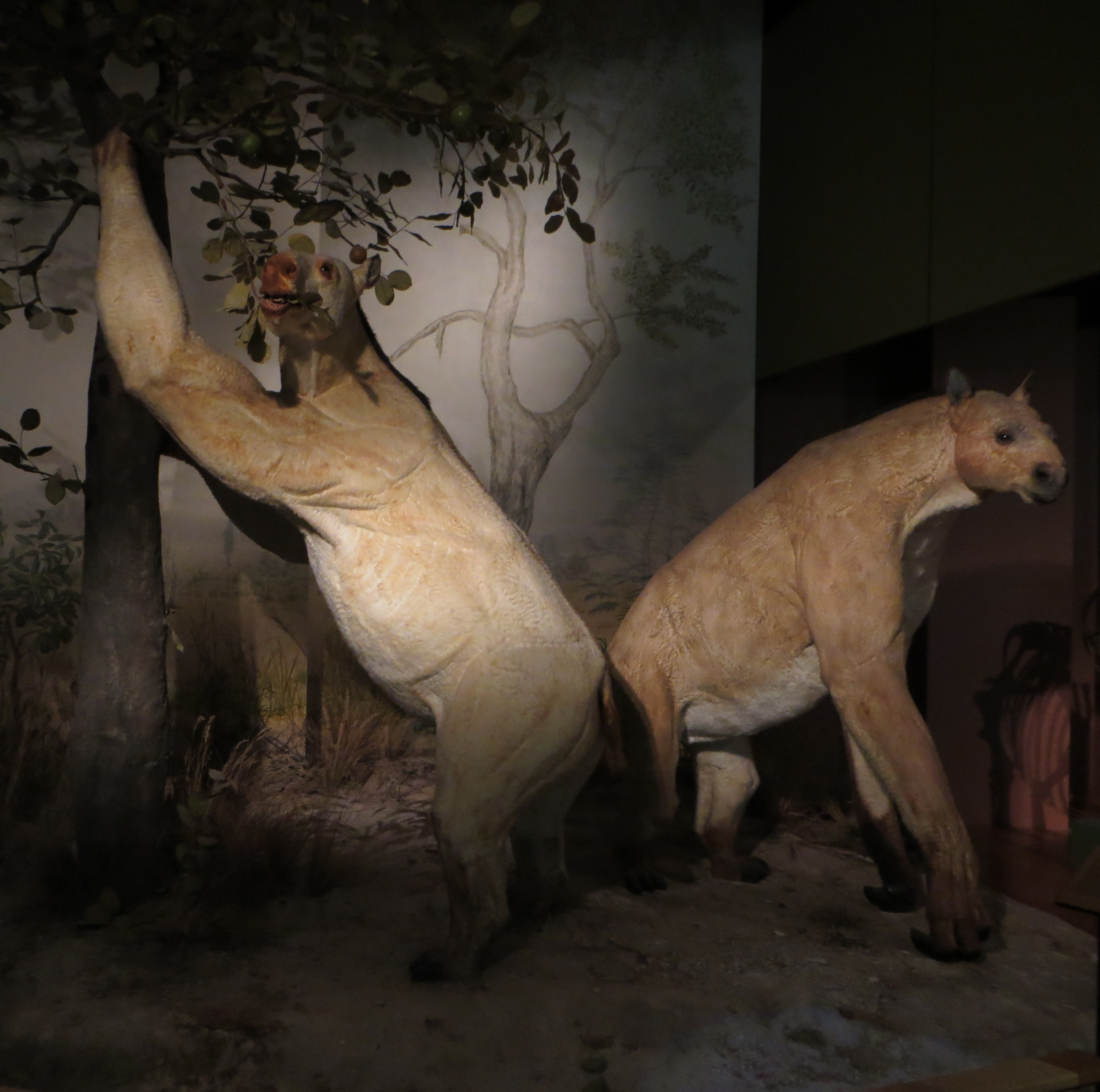
- Life restoration of Anisodon (Chalicotheriinae)

Scientific classification
- Kingdom: Animalia
- Phylum: Chordata
- Class: Mammalia
- Order: Perissodactyla
- Superfamily: †Chalicotherioidea
- Family: †Chalicotheriidae; Gill, 1872

Type genus
- †Chalicotherium Kaup, 1833

Subfamilies
- †Chalicotheriinae Gill, 1872; †Anisodon; †Chalicotherium; †Iriritherium; †Kalimantsia; †Hesperotherium; †Nestoritherium; †Winamia; †Schizotheriinae Holland and Peterson, 1914; †Ancylotherium; †Borissiakia; †Chemositia; †Metaschizotherium; †Moropus; †Phyllotillon; †Schizotherium; †Tylocephalonyx

= Chalicotheriidae =

Chalicotheriidae Temporal range: Oligocene to early Pleistocene ~34–1 Ma

Family of extinct mammals

Chalicotheriidae (from Ancient Greek χάλιξ (khálix), meaning "gravel", and θηρίον (theríon), meaning "beast") is an extinct family of herbivorous, perissodactyl mammals that lived in North America, Eurasia, and Africa from the Oligocene to the Early Pleistocene. Unlike living odd-toed ungulates, chalicotheres bore large claws on their hands rather than hooves, thought to have been used for grasping vegetation, with their dentition being adapted for browsing on foliage as well as possibly bark and fruit. Chalicotheriidae is divided into two subfamilies, Chalicotheriinae and Schizotheriinae. While members of Schizotheriinae had body proportions resembling those of other ungulates, members of the subfamily Chalicotheriinae developed unusual elongated gorilla-like forelimbs.

== History of discovery ==
The first chalicothere remains discovered were ungual phalanges found near Eppelsheim, Germany in the early 19th century. In 1822, Georges Cuvier considered these remains to belong to gigantic pangolins. Whereas, in 1833, Johann Jakob Kaup attributed them to Deinotherium (which at that time was considered enigmatic); however, he described chalicothere teeth as belonging to the new genus Chalicotherium from the same locality, which he did not recognise as belonging to the same species as the ungual phalanges. Beginning in the 1930s, the Sansan deposit in southern France was excavated for fossils, yielding remains of chalicotheres. In 1837, postcranial remains from the deposit were given the name "Macrotherium" by Édouard Lartet, who like Cuvier thought the remains represented those of a giant pangolin/edentate. In 1849, Henri Marie Ducrotay de Blainville described chalicothere skull remains from Sansan as belonging to the ungulate genus Anoplotherium (an extinct even-toed ungulate now known to be unrelated to chalicotheres). It was only in 1890 that a complete chalicothere skeleton found at Sansan was described by Henri Filhol, showing the skulls/teeth and the postcranial remains belonged to the same unusual animal.

== Description ==
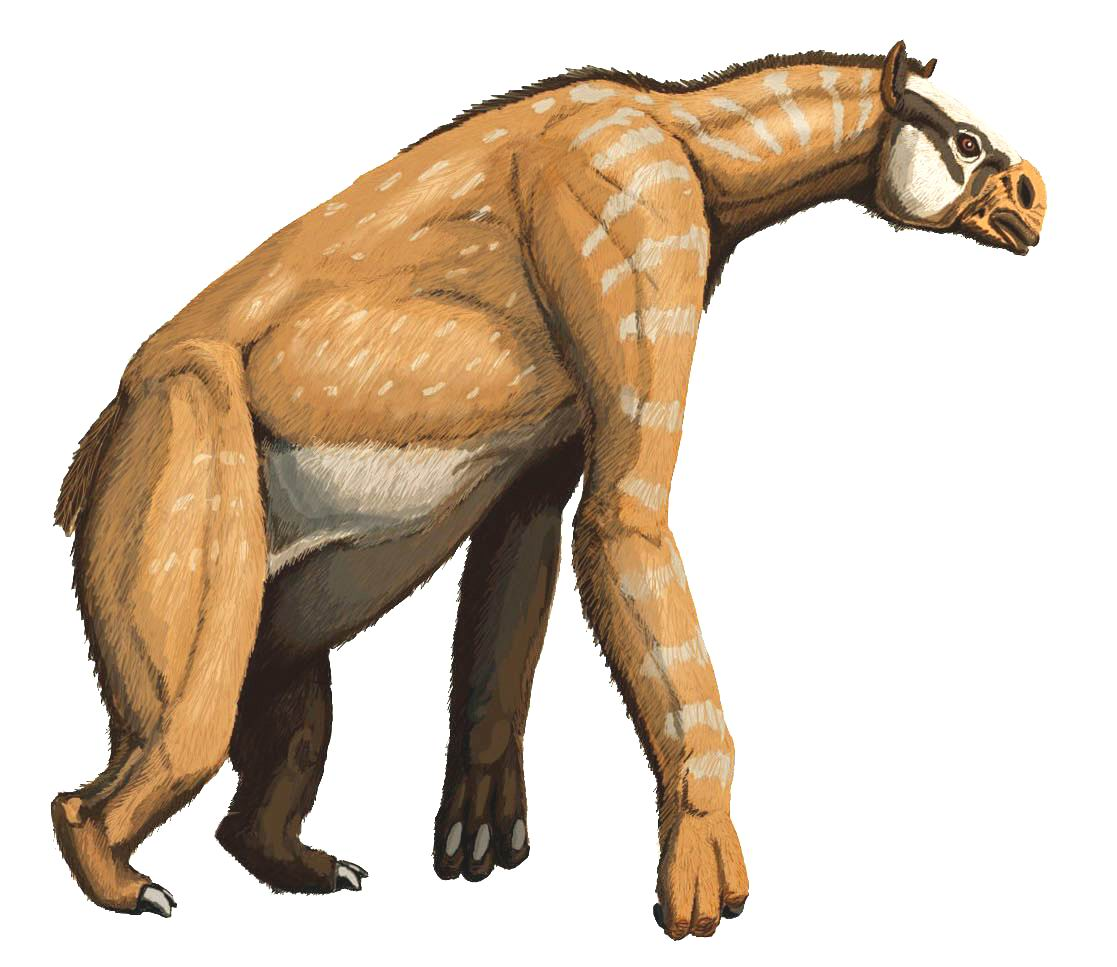
Life restoration of the chalicotheriine Anisodon grande, formerly Chalicotherium grande.

Unlike modern perissodactyls, chalicotheres had clawed feet. They had lower incisors that cropped food against a toothless pad in the upper jaw, low-crowned molar teeth, and were browsers on trees and shrubs throughout their history. They evolved in two different directions, which became separate subfamilies, the Schizotheriinae and the Chalicotheriinae.

Schizotherine chalicotheres, such as Moropus, had relatively equal length limbs, and lived in a variety of forest, woodland, and savannah habitats in Asia, Africa, and North America. They developed long necks and skull adaptations that suggest they had long, extensible tongues to reach browse, like those of giraffes. Strong hindlimbs and an elongated pelvis suggest they could have reared upright as modern goats do, and used their front claws to pull branches within reach of the tongue. The claws were retractable, and they walked normally on the bottom of the foot. Studies of tooth wear suggest they ate leaves, twigs, fruit, and bark.

Chalicotheriines, such as Anisodon, lived only in moist, closed-canopy forests, never reached the Americas, and developed very unusual anatomy for an ungulate. Their shorter necks and horse-like heads did not show adaptations to reach high. Instead, they developed very long forelimbs with mobile shoulder joints and hooklike claws. The pelvis and hindlimbs were specialized to stand upright, and to sit for hours while feeding, like the living gelada monkey. Some early paleontologists thought the claws were used to dig up roots and tubers, but their teeth were designed for soft foods, and studies of tooth wear show they ate fruit and seeds. Their forelimbs were specialized to reach, grasp, and strip or sweep plants to the mouth. They could not retract the huge front claws, and knuckle-walked on their forelimbs. The chalicotheriines' anatomical design, posture, and locomotion show convergence with other large browsers that feed selectively in a bipedal position, such as the ground sloths, gorillas, and giant pandas.

Chalicothere fossils are uncommon even in areas where other taxa of similar size are well-preserved. Only two species of chalicothere are known from complete skeletons, the schizotheriine Moropus from the early Miocene of North America, and the chalicotheriine Anisodon from the middle Miocene of Europe. Fossils of other species range from very fragmentary to moderately complete.

== Evolution ==
Chalicotheres are part of the order Perissodactyla, which includes modern equines, rhinoceroses, and tapirs, as well as extinct relatives like brontotheres. As the early evolution of perissodactyls is still unresolved, their closest relatives among other perissodactyl groups is obscure. They are generally placed as part of the clade Ancylopoda alongside their close relatives Lophiodontidae. Many studies considered them as closer to Ceratomorpha (which includes tapirs and rhinoceroses) than Equoidea. A 2004 cladistic study alternatively recovered Ancylopoda as sister to all modern perissodactyls (which includes Equoidea and Ceratomorpha), with the brontotheres as the most distantly related within the order Perissodactyla.

The earliest members of the Chalicotheriidae proper date to the Oligocene, though the oldest members of the broader Chalicotheroidea (which are also sometimes known as chalicotheres) are known from the early Eocene of Asia. The family is thought to have originated in Eurasia, and chalicotheres did not expand outside Eurasia until the Miocene. By the end of the Oligocene, they had divided into schizotheriines and chalicotheriines. Both subfamilies were successful over many millions of years, and reached their greatest geographical extent in the Miocene. Advanced schizotheriines (Moropus) entered North America via the Bering land bridge at the Oligocene-Miocene boundary, c. 23 Ma and expanded southward into Central America. Chalicotheriinae expanded into Africa around 20 Ma, following the formation of the Gomphotherium land bridge.

Never common animals, the chalicotheres declined from the late Neogene onwards, disappearing from North America and Europe by end of the Miocene. The youngest chalicotheres are the chalicotheriines Hesperotherium from the Early Pleistocene of China, Nestoritherium from the Early Pleistocene of Myanmar, as well as the schizotheriine Ancylotherium from the Early Pleistocene of Eastern and Southern Africa, also possibly known from the Early Pleistocene of China. In China, Hesperotherium is suggested to have survived until the near the end of the Early Pleistocene, around 1 million years ago.
