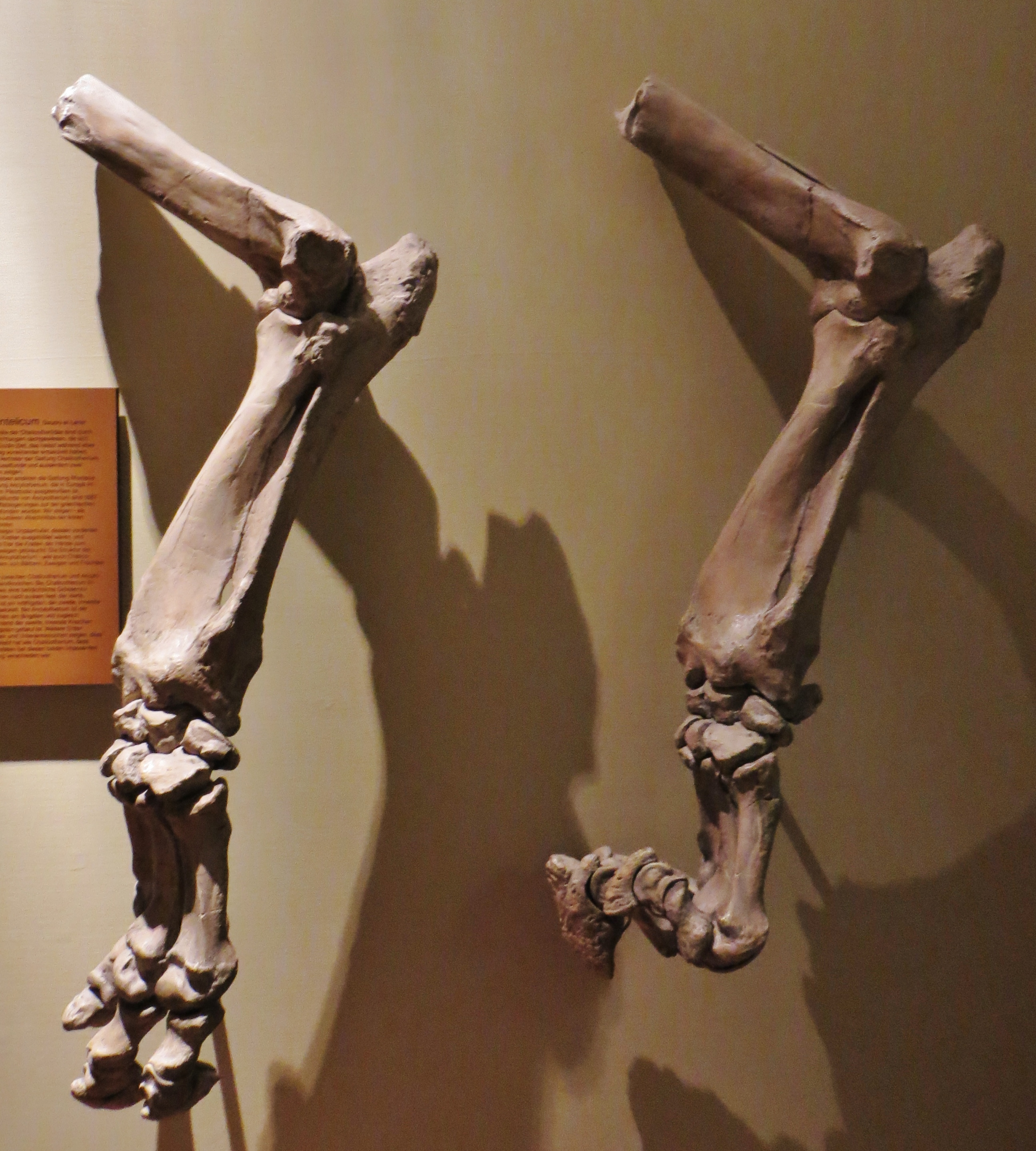
- A. pentelicum arms

Scientific classification
- Kingdom: Animalia
- Phylum: Chordata
- Class: Mammalia
- Order: Perissodactyla
- Family: †Chalicotheriidae
- Subfamily: †Schizotheriinae
- Genus: †Ancylotherium; Gaudry, 1863

Species
- A. hennigi; A. pentelicum Gaudry and Lartet 1856; A. hellenicum Koufos 2012

= Ancylotherium =

Ancylotherium Temporal range: 6.5–1.8 Ma Late Miocene to Early Pleistocene

Extinct genus of mammals

Ancylotherium (from Greek, meaning "hooked beast") is an extinct genus of the family Chalicotheriidae, subfamily Schizotheriinae, endemic to Europe, Asia, and Africa during the Late Miocene-Early Pleistocene (11.6—1.8 mya), existing for approximately 9.8 million years.

== Taxonomy ==
Ancylotherium was named by Gaudry (1863) and was assigned to Chalicotheriidae by Carroll (1988); and to Schizotheriinae by Geraads et al. (2007).

== Description ==
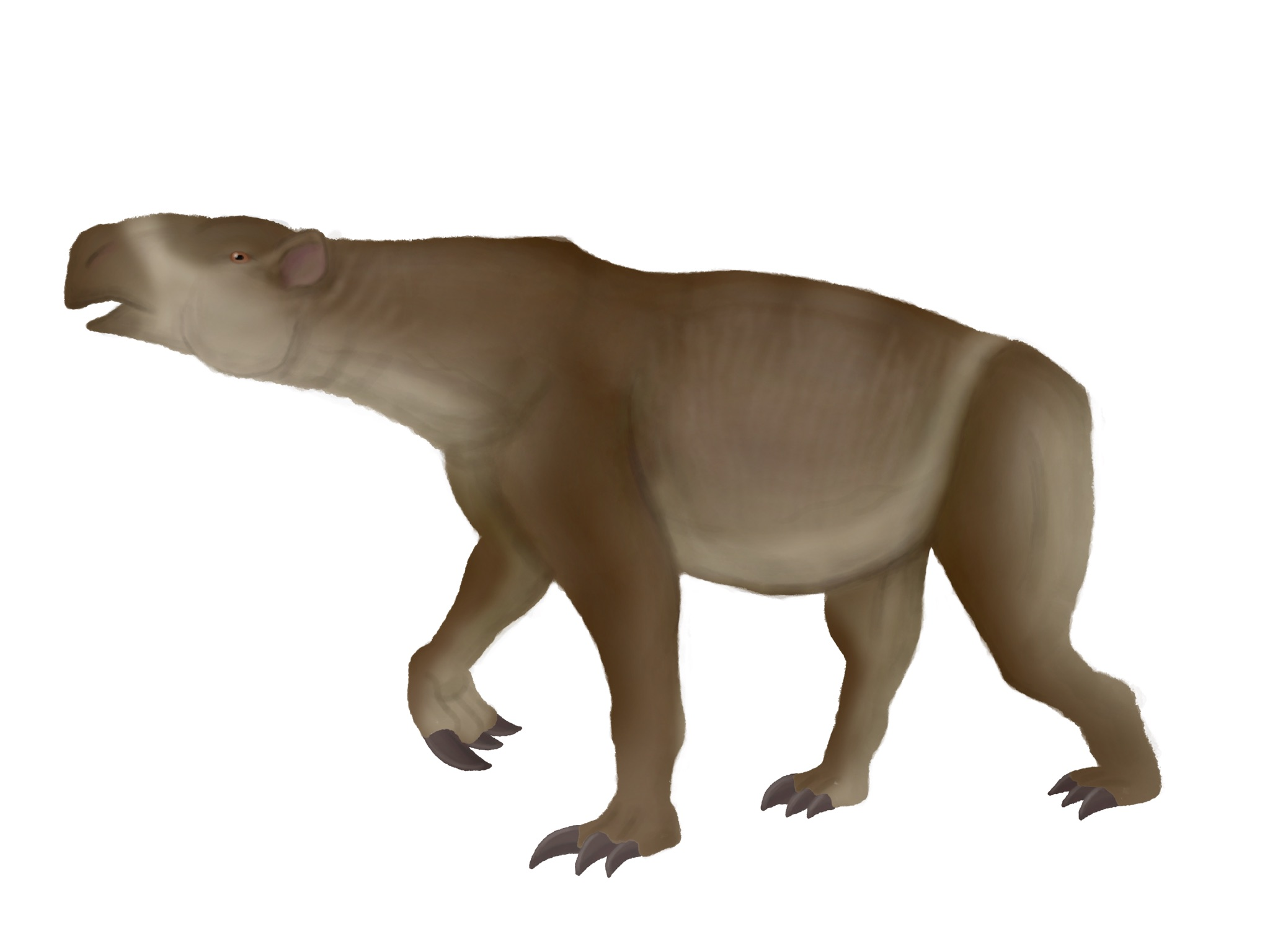
Life restoration

With some individuals reaching 2 metres (6.6 ft) high at the shoulder and a weight of 450 kilograms (990 lb), Ancylotherium was relatively large, and was built rather like a goat. Individuals varied considerably in size, and the genus may have been sexually dimorphic, like many other chalicotheres. While it had the typical long forelimbs and short hind limbs of a chalicothere, like other schizotheriines, it did not walk on its knuckles. It was similar to the North American genus Moropus. In at least some individuals of A. pentelicum the frontal bone of the skull is inflated to form a dome, similar to but less marked than in the "dome-headed" chalicothere Tylocephalonyx. This genus is North American and Ancylotherium is likely to be more closely related to other African and European genera, so the feature may have evolved independently in two lineages. This would suggest it reflects a common behavior in schizotheriine chalicotheres, such as using the head as a battering ram in territorial or dominance contests, as modern giraffes do. Ancylotherium had the highest-crowned teeth of any chalicothere, suggesting a diet of more abrasive plants. While this has been reconstructed as leaves, twigs, and tree bark, one skull discovered in China was from a dry steppe zone with few trees; the genus may have been less dependent on browsing leaves than other chalicotheres.

== Paleoenvironment ==
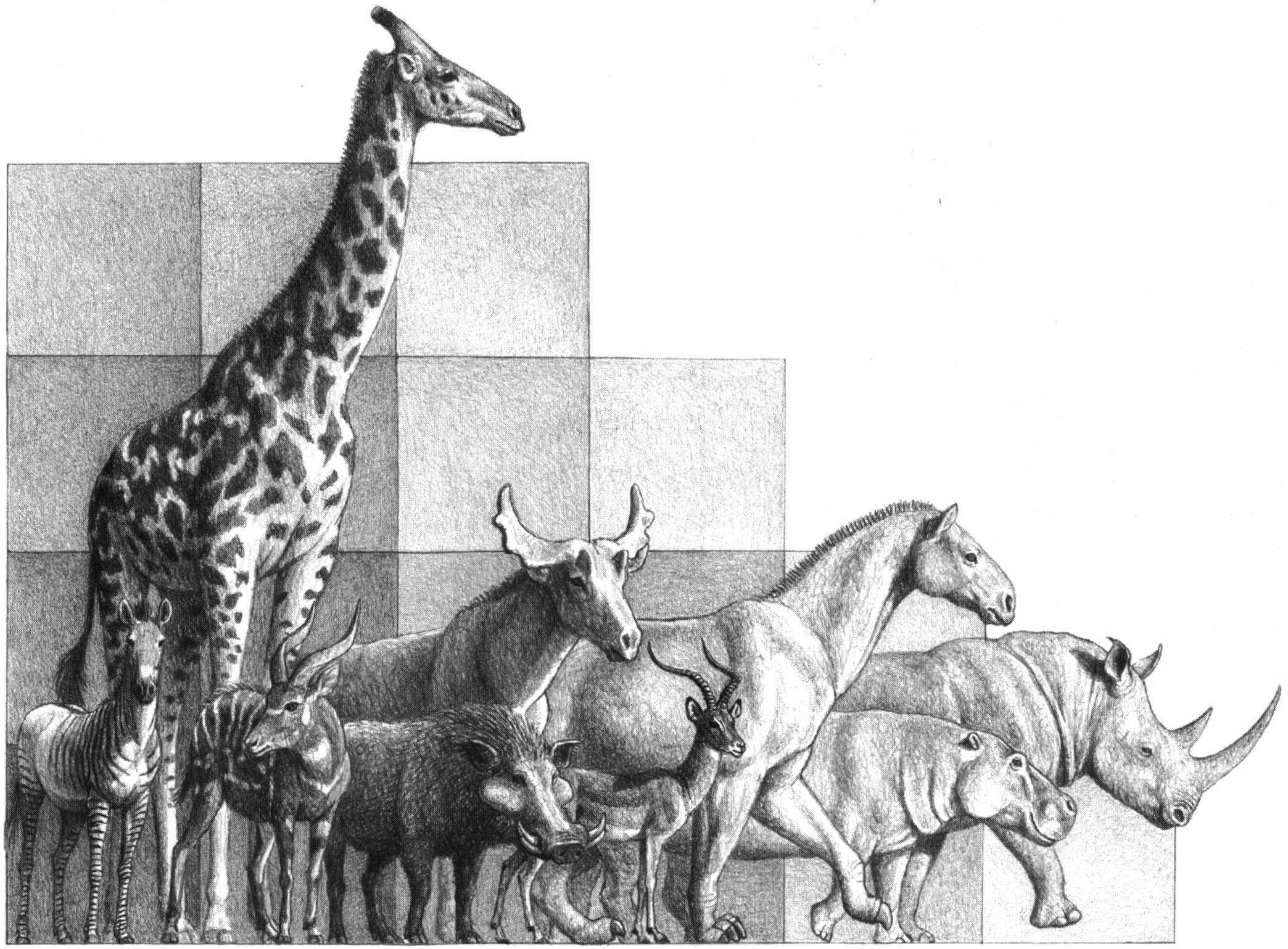
Ungulates from the Pliocene of eastern Africa, including A. hennigi

Ancylotherium's habitat was the savannahs of Eurasia, East and South Africa. As a herbivore, it evolved to browse on vegetation on the trees in the grassy savannahs of Africa. Ancylotherium's closest relatives are the other perissodactyls, or "odd-toed" ungulates, including the extinct brontotheres and modern-day mammals such as horses, tapirs, and rhinoceroses.

Fossil remains of Ancylotherium have been found at many of the hominid fossil sites in Plio-Pleistocene Ethiopia, Kenya, South Africa and Tanzania, including sites in Laetoli, Olduvai and Omo. Furthermore, Miocene era fossils of Ancylotherium are located in Kenya, Bulgaria, Greece, Turkey, Iran, and Afghanistan.

In Africa, the range of the genus spans from the Late Miocene to the Early Pleistocene, making it one of the last surviving chalicotheres.

== See also ==
- Moropus (a North American chalicothere)
