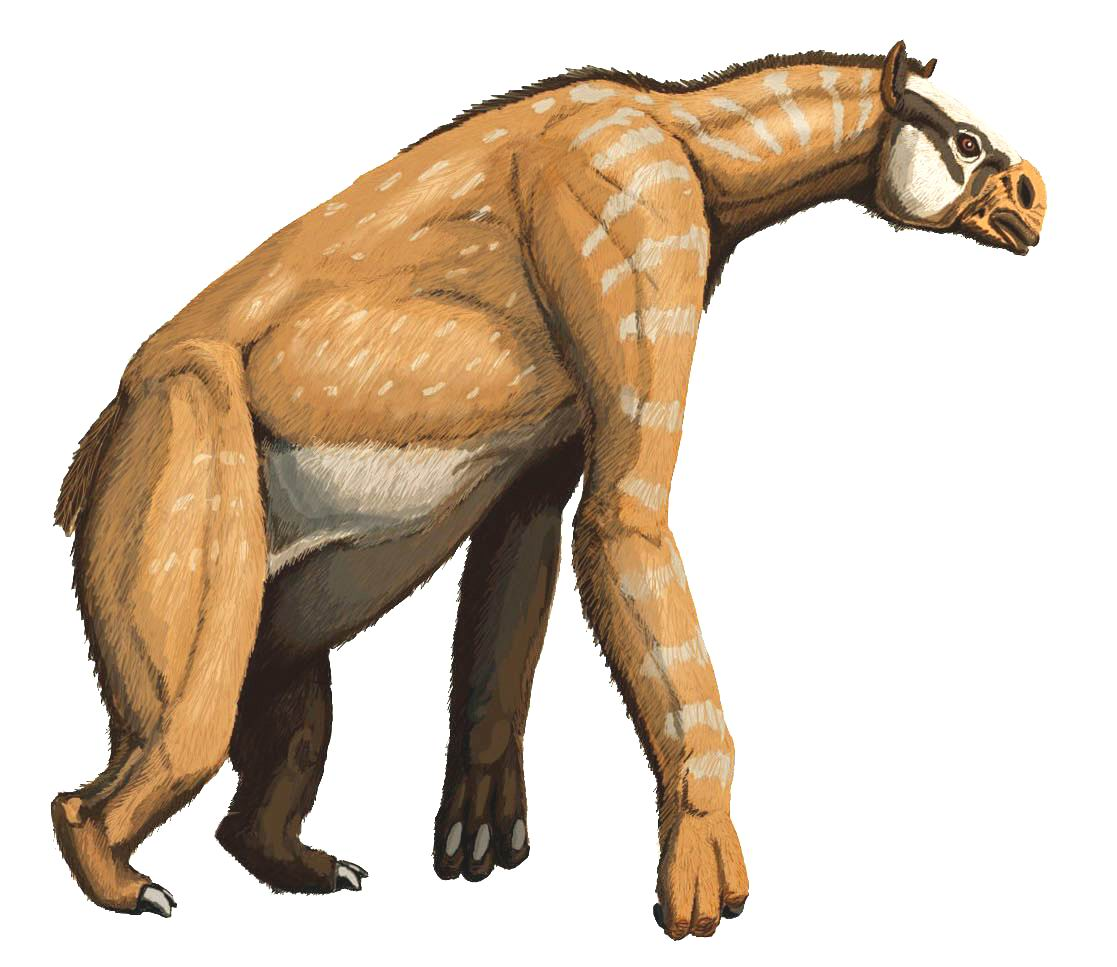
- Restoration

Scientific classification
- Kingdom: Animalia
- Phylum: Chordata
- Class: Mammalia
- Order: Perissodactyla
- Family: †Chalicotheriidae
- Subfamily: †Chalicotheriinae
- Genus: †Anisodon; Lartet, 1851

Type species
- †Anisodon grande de Blainville, 1849

Species
- A. grande; A. macedonicus; A. salinus

= Anisodon =

Anisodon Temporal range: Late Miocene

Extinct genus of chalicothere

Anisodon (from Ancient Greek ἄνῑσος (ánīsos), meaning "unequal", and ὀδούς (odoús), meaning "tooth", and thus, "unequal teeth") is an extinct genus of chalicothere that lived in Eurasia during the late Miocene. It stood at about 150 cm (59 in) and weighed around 600 kg (1,300 lb). It is thought that the animal's clawed forelimbs would have allowed it to pull down tree branches in order to browse, as well as deter Miocene predators such as bear-dogs and saber-toothed cats.

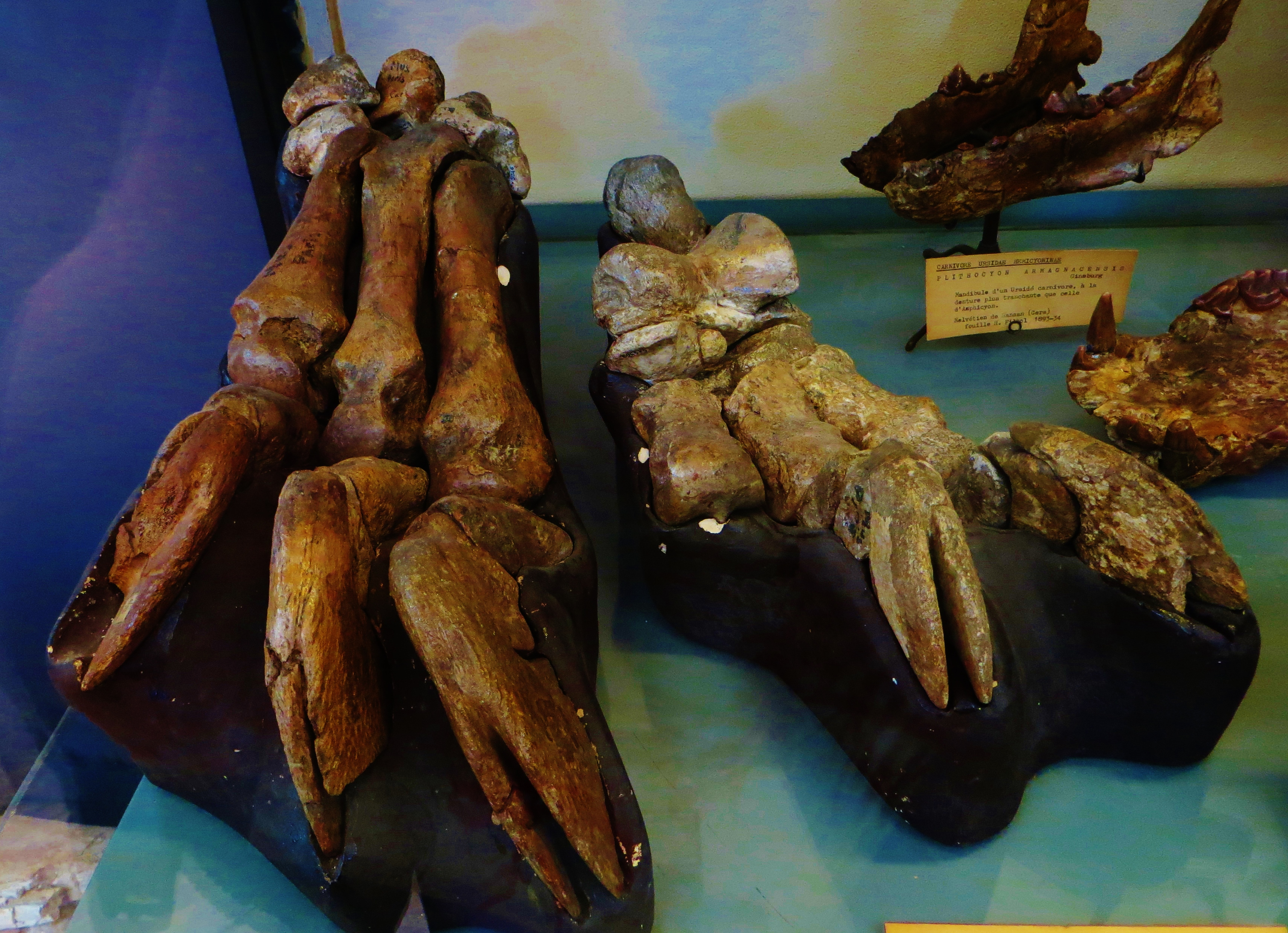
Foot bones at the Gallery of Paleontology and Comparative Anatomy, Paris.

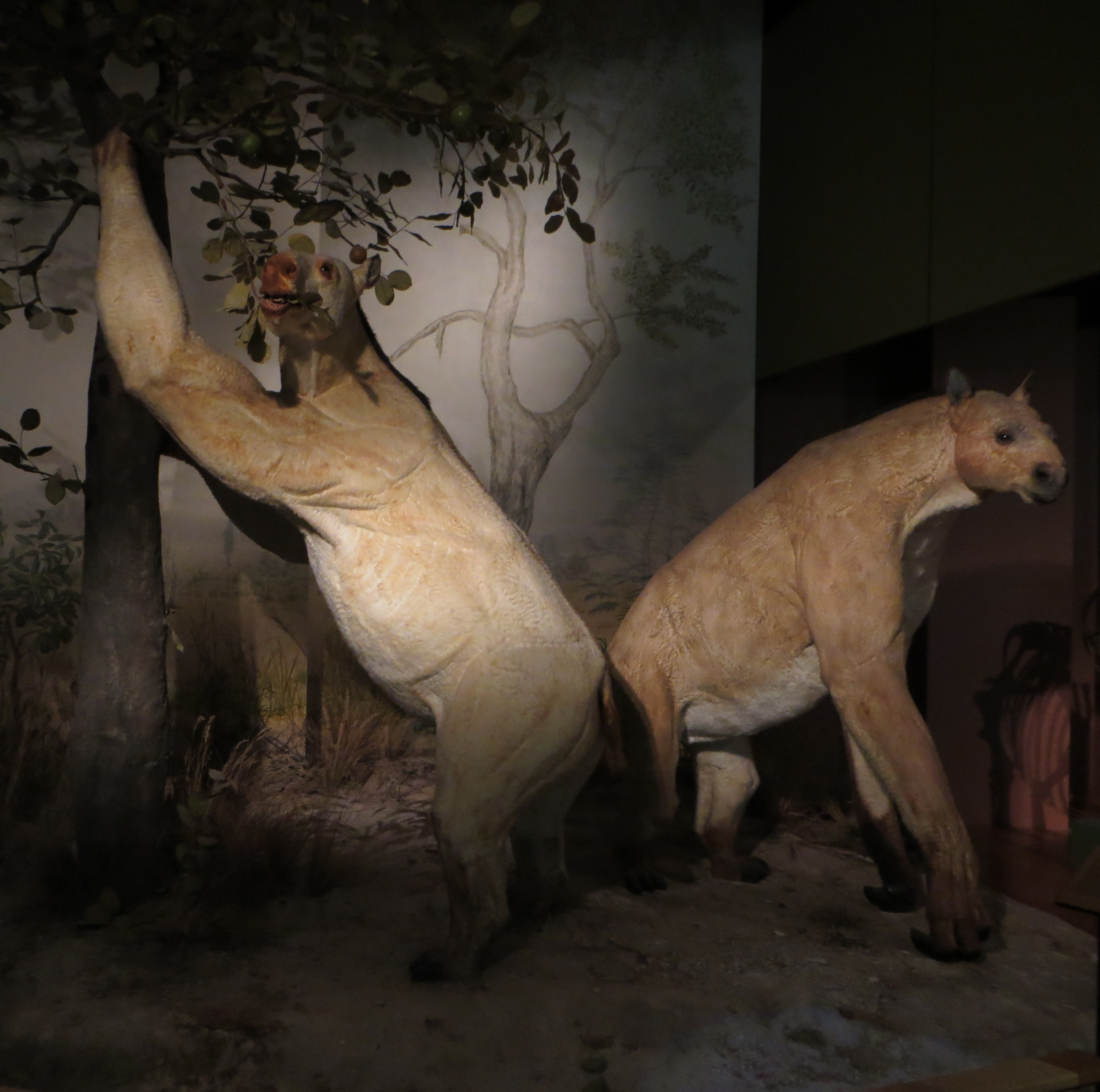
Models in Basel
