= Chalicotherium =

Chalicotherium Temporal range: Early to Late Miocene, 23.0–5.3 Ma
- Teeth of C. goldfussi

Scientific classification
- Kingdom: Animalia
- Phylum: Chordata
- Class: Mammalia
- Order: Perissodactyla
- Family: †Chalicotheriidae
- Subfamily: †Chalicotheriinae
- Genus: †Chalicotherium; Kaup, 1833

Type species
- †Chalicotherium goldfussi Kaup, 1833

Species
- See text

Synonyms
- Macrotherium Lartet, 1837

Extinct genus of mammals

Chalicotherium (from Ancient Greek χάλιξ (khálix), meaning "gravel", and θηρίον (theríon), meaning "beast") is an extinct genus of perissodactyls in the family Chalicotheriidae. It inhabited Europe and Asia from the Early Miocene to the Late Miocene, 23.0–5.3 million years ago. Like other chalicotheriids, the species was an unusual herbivore with elongated, clawed forelimbs and shorter, more robust weight-bearing hindlimbs.

The type species, Chalicotherium goldfussi, was described by Johann Jakob Kaup in 1833 from Late Miocene deposits in Europe. When French naturalist George Cuvier received a large, cleft claw from Eppelheim, Germany, he mistakenly identified it as the toe bone of a giant pangolin.

== Description ==
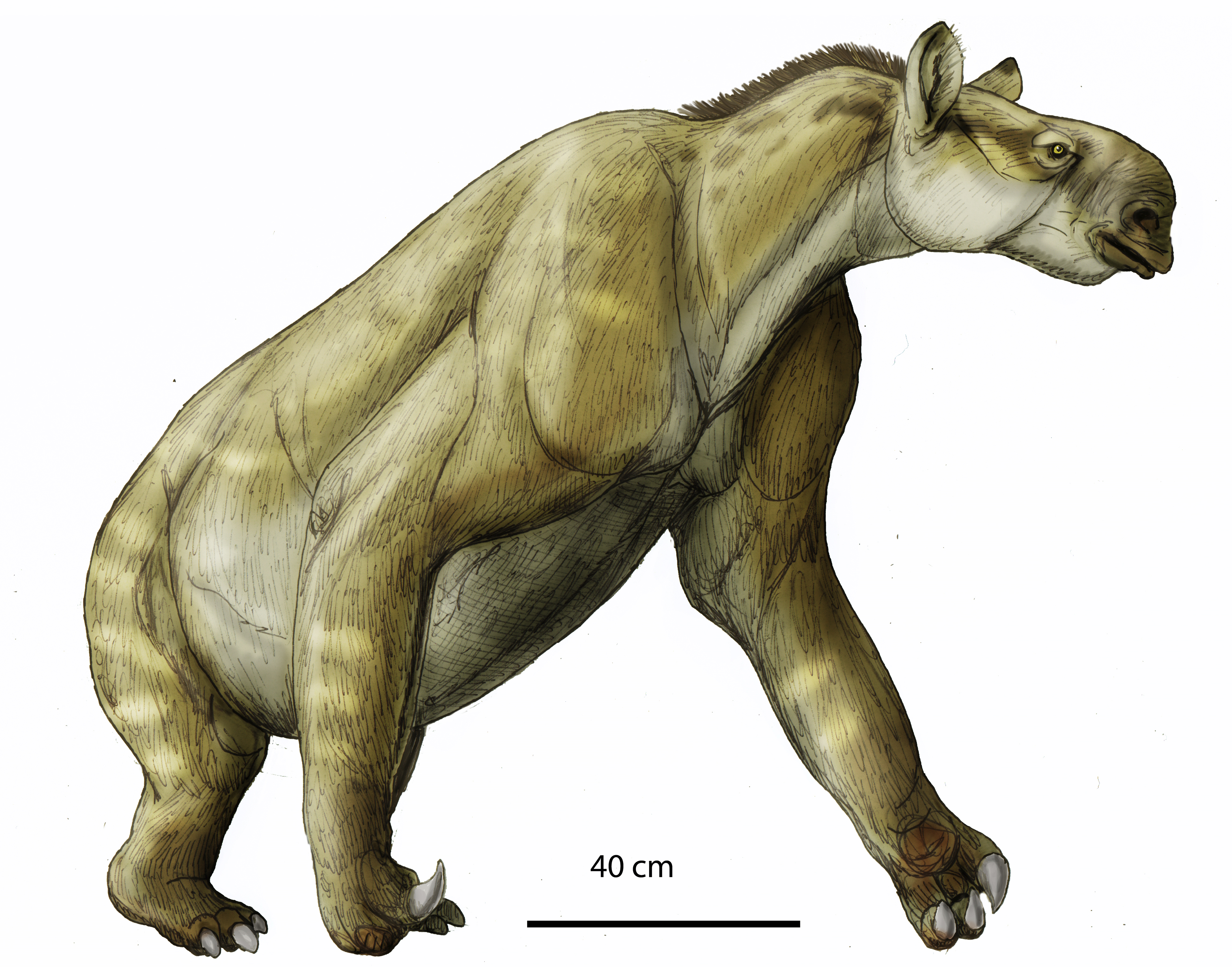
Life restoration of C. brevirostris

Chalicotherium, like many members of Perissodactyla, was adapted to browsing, though the chalicotheres were uniquely adapted to do so among ungulates. Its arms were long and heavily clawed, allowing them to walk on their knuckles only. The arms were used to reach for the branches of large trees and bring them close to its long head to strip them clean of leaves. The horse-like head itself shows adaptation to a diet of soft vegetation, since, as the animal reached sexual maturity, the incisors and upper canines were shed, suggesting that its muscular lips and the resulting gum pads were enough to crop fodder which was then processed by squarish, low-crowned molars.

Callosities on the ischium imply that these animals would sit on their haunches for extended periods of time, probably while feeding. Pad-supporting bony growth on the dorsal side of the manual phalanges is interpreted as evidence of knuckle-walking, which would probably be useful to avoid wearing down the claws, preserving them for use as either as a forage-collecting rake or as formidable defensive weapons, or both.

All of these characteristics show some convergence with such other creatures as ground sloths, great apes, bears (especially giant pandas), and a group of theropod dinosaurs known as therizinosaurs.

== Classification ==
=== Taxonomic history ===
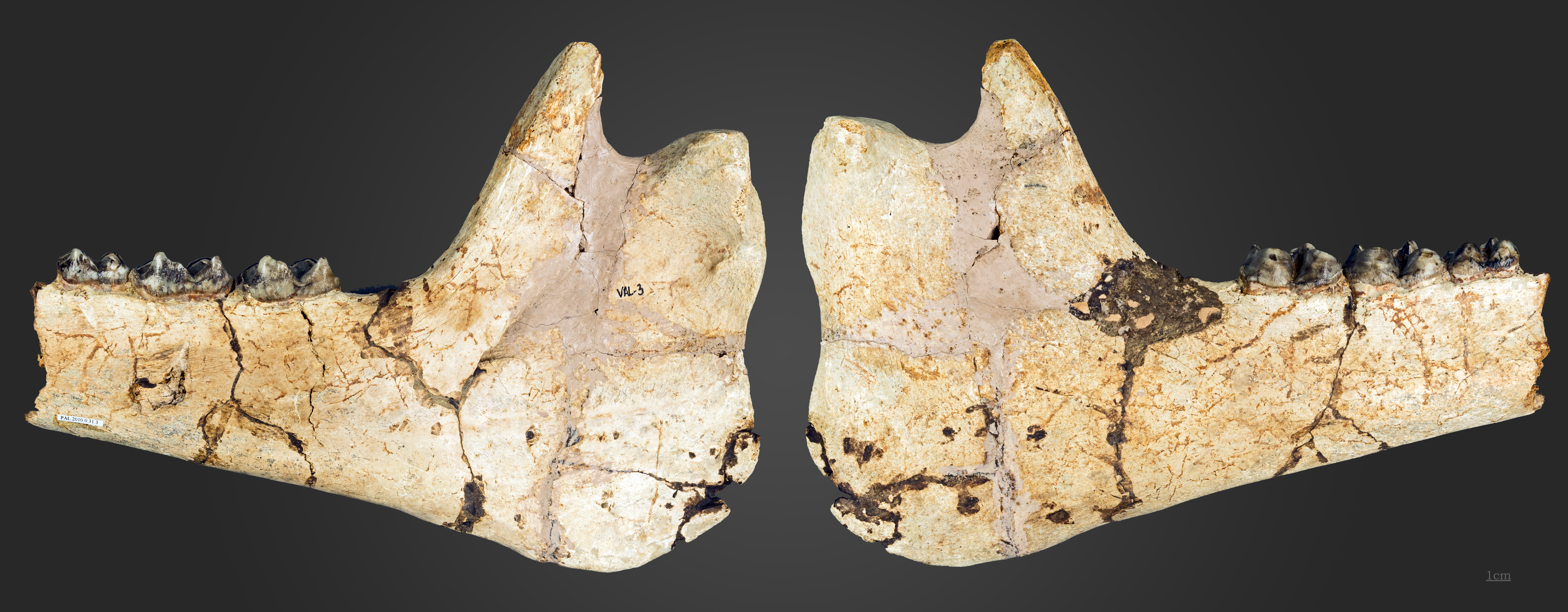
Chalicotherium goldfussi jaw

The type specimens for Chalicotherium goldfussi were found in the Upper Miocene strata of the Dinotherien-sande beds near Eppelsheim, in the Grand Duchy of Hesse, Germany. Johann Jakob Kaup, when describing this new animal in 1833, found the teeth to be pebble-like and named the creature accordingly. Later on, limbs found in strata located at Sansan in the department of Gers, Southwestern France, were first described as Macrotherium by Édouard Lartet in 1837. Further study of these fossil remains and subsequent finds by Filhol warranted a referral of the material described as Macrotherium to Chalicotherium.

Referral history for each species is detailed in the species list below along with morphological and geographical data where available.

=== Species ===
Valid

- Chalicotherium goldfussi (J.J. Kaup, 1833)

The chalicothere type species, was found in upper Miocene fossil beds located in Germany. It weighed around 1500 kg and was 2.6 m high at the shoulder.

- Chalicotherium brevirostris (Colbert, 1934)

First described as Macrotherium brevirostris, this species is from the upper Miocene Tung Gur Formation, Inner Mongolia, China.

Invalid

- Chalicotherium antiquum (J.J. Kaup, 1833)

Found at the same place as the type species and initially assigned as a separate species of chalicothere, but later determined deficient in distinctive diagnostic features, and merged into the type species C. goldfussi.
Misassigned specimens

- Chalicotherium cf. C. brevirostris (Wang et al., 2001)

From the Tsaidam Basin, northern Qinghai-Tibetan Plateau, China.

- "Chalicotherium modicum" (Stehlin, 1905)

A nomen nudum given to a tooth that was later identified as from a different chalicothere: Schizotherium priscum.

- "Chalicotherium bilobatum" (Cope)

From the Oligocene in Saskatchewan, this very fragmentary specimen was the type on which Russel erected the genus Oreinotherium.

- Chalicotherium spp.

Specimens found at two sites in Tajikistan, thought to include at least two different species.

- Chalicotherium salinum (Pickford, 1982)

First described as Macrotherium salinum by Forster Cooper, this species was first discovered from Specimens collected from the Sivalik Hills of northern Indian subcontinent, and its range has since been extended to China and Myanmar as well. However, it has later been referred to the genus Anisodon, leading to a new combination A. salinus.

== Palaeoecology ==
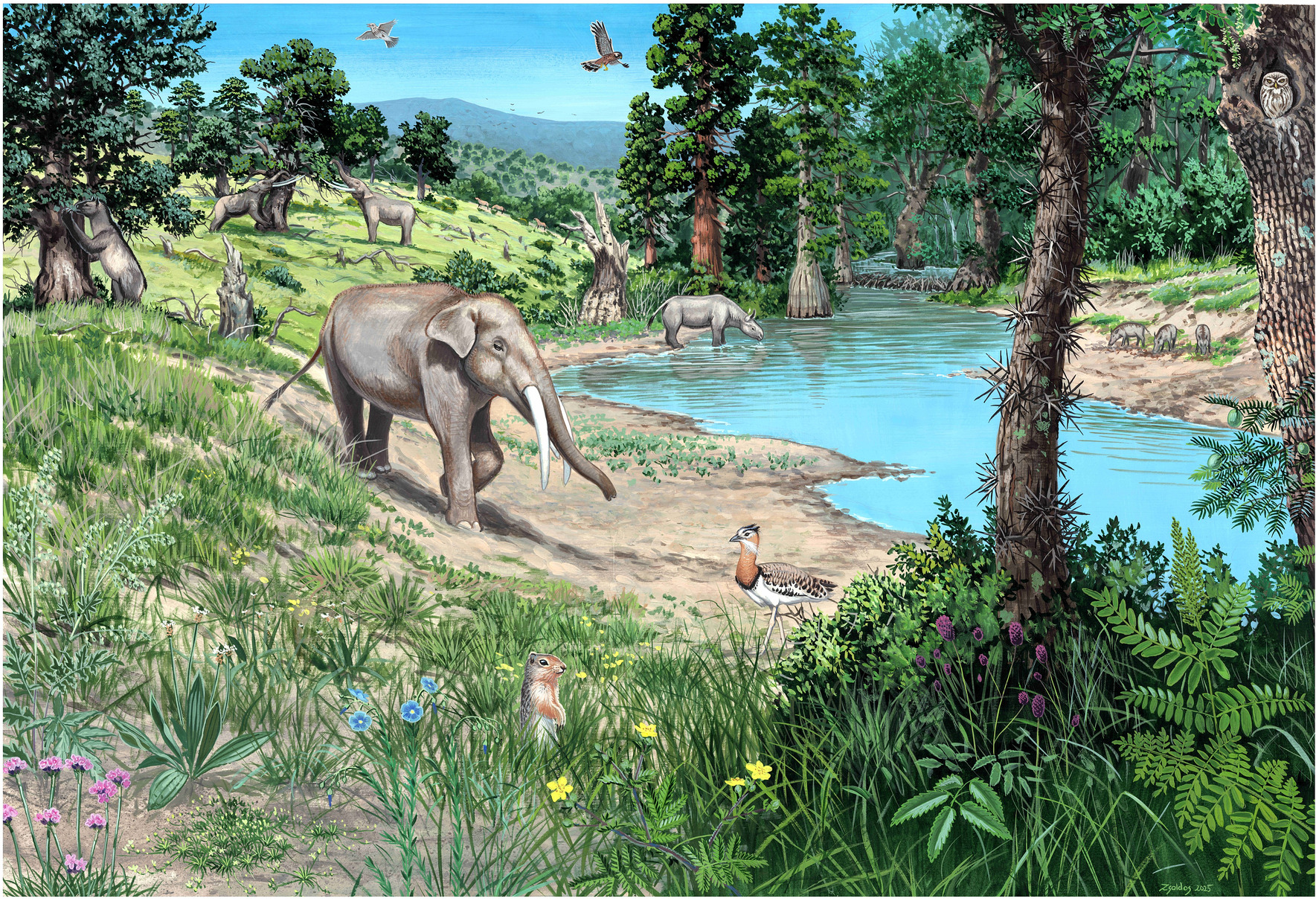
Late Miocene European landscape, including Chalicotherium goldfussi (midground left), as well as the proboscideans (elephant relatives) Gomphotherium angustidens and Zygolophodon turicensis, the rhinoceros Aceratherium, the swine Parachleuastochoerus, the equine Hipparion, the ground squirrel Spermophilinus as well as kestrel bustard, little owl and lark

Studies of the dental microwear and mesowear of C. goldfussi indicate that it was a browsing herbivore that consumed bark and twigs in addition to leaves, a finding consistent with morphological adaptations of chalicotheriines such as large ungual phalanges, protractible forelimbs, reduced hindlimbs, and highly pronounced insertion surfaces on the mandible for muscles involved in mastication that would suggest such a diet.

== See also ==
- Anisodon
- Moropus
