= Panda (disambiguation) =

The giant panda (Ailuropoda melanoleuca) is a bear from the family Ursidae.

Panda or Panda bear may also refer to:

== Animals and plants ==
- Ailuridae, the family of the red panda (Ailurus fulgens) and its extinct relatives
  - Red panda (Ailurus fulgens), the only living member in the family Ailuridae
- Ailuropoda, the genus of the panda bear and several other extinct species
  - Ailuropoda microta (pygmy giant panda), an extinct species, the earliest known ancestor of the giant panda
  - Qinling panda (Ailuropoda melanoleuca qinlingensis), a subspecies of the giant panda
- Trash panda, a slang term for a raccoon
- Panda oleosa, a plant species
- Corydoras panda, a species of catfish
- Panda cow, a breed of miniature cattle
- Panda German Shepherds, a type of German Shepherd dogs
- Appias panda, a species of butterfly
- Panda Telescope, a variant of Telescope goldfish

== Arts and entertainment ==
=== Fictional characters ===
- Panda (We Bare Bears), fictional panda bear
- Panda, a character from the Tekken video game series
- Panda, a character from the Hamtaro anime series
- Panda, a character from the Jujutsu Kaisen manga and anime series
- Panda, a character from the Shirokuma Cafe anime series
- Panda, H. Rider Haggard's fictional representation of Mpande kaSenzangakhona, King of the Zulus

=== Music ===
- Panda (band), a Mexican rock band
- "Panda" (song), a 2015 song by Desiigner
- Panda Bear (album), a 1999 album by Panda Bear
- "Panda", song by Grace Slick from the 1990 March for the Animals
- "Panda", a song by Astro from the 2011 album Astro
- "Panda Bear", a 2007 song by Owl City from Of June

=== Other uses in arts and entertainment ===
- Panda (comics), a Dutch comic strip series
- Canal Panda, a Portuguese television channel
- Panda Kids, a Portuguese television channel

== Businesses and organisations ==
- Panda (Finnish company), a confectionery company
- Panda Electronics, a Chinese manufacturer and brand for electronic products
- Panda Energy International, an American privately held company
- Panda Entertainment, a video game developer from Taiwan
- Panda Hotel, a hotel in Hong Kong
- Panda Restaurant Group
  - Panda Express, a fast casual restaurant chain
  - Panda Inn, a chain of sit-down Chinese restaurants in California
- Panda Security, a Spanish IT security company
- Panda Retail Company, a Saudi Arabian grocery retailing company

== People ==
- Panda (surname)
- Pænda (born 1988), Austrian singer
- Panda (musician) (Pieter Hooghoudt, born 1986), Dutch electronic musician
- Panda Bear (musician) (Noah Benjamin Lennox, born 1978), American experimental musician and one of the members of Animal Collective
- Panda (footballer) (born 1984), full name Márcio Gama Moreira, Brazilian footballer

== Places ==
- Panda, Comoros, a village on the island of Grande Comore
- Panda, Likasi, a commune in the Democratic Republic of the Congo
- Panda District, a district in Mozambique
- Panda Island, a coral island in the Caribbean Sea

== Science and technology ==
- Panda3D, a software game engine
- PANDA experiment, a particle physics experiment
- Ansco Panda, a camera
- Google Panda, a search-results ranking algorithm
- Panda, a brand of polarization-maintaining optical fiber

== Sports ==
- Panda Game, a Canadian rivalry football game
- Panda Global, an esports brand associated with Nintendo's Super Smash Bros

== Transportation ==
- Aero-Service Panda, a Polish ultralight aircraft
- Fiat Panda, a car
  - SEAT Panda, a car
- Geely Panda, a car
- Panda car, a small or medium-sized marked British police car
- Phillips Panda, a moped
- USS Panda (IX-125), a U.S. Navy tanker
- Panda crossing, a pedestrian crossing used in the UK in the 1960s

== Other uses ==
- Empanda or Panda, a Roman goddess
- Chinese Silver Panda, a silver coin
- Chinese Gold Panda, a gold coin
- Panda bond, a Chinese renminbi-denominated bond

== See also ==
- Giant panda (disambiguation)
- Kung Fu Panda (disambiguation)
- Pandan (disambiguation)
- Pandas (disambiguation)
- Chakulia panda, a sect in the Indian state of Odisha
- Pandanet, a server for players of the game of Go
- Apanda, a genus of moth
