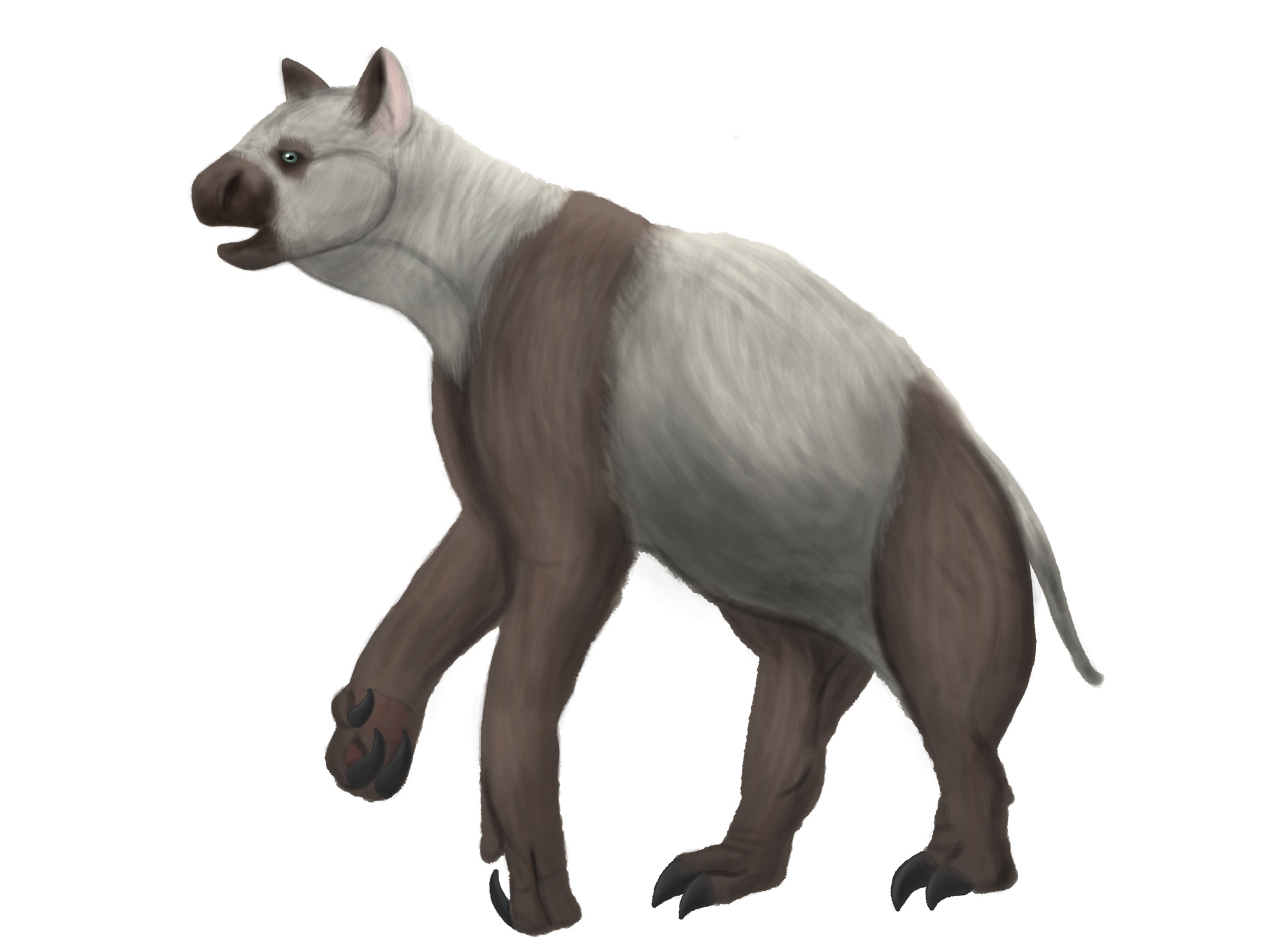
- Life restoration of Hesperotherium

Scientific classification
- Kingdom: Animalia
- Phylum: Chordata
- Class: Mammalia
- Order: Perissodactyla
- Family: †Chalicotheriidae
- Subfamily: †Chalicotheriinae
- Genus: †Hesperotherium; Qiu Zhan-Xiang, 2002
- Species: †H. sinense

Binomial name
- †Hesperotherium sinense Qiu Zhan-Xiang, 2002

= Hesperotherium =

Hesperotherium Temporal range: Early to Middle Pleistocene 0.781 Ma

Extinct genus of chalicotheres

Hesperotherium (from Ancient Greek ἕσπερος (hésperos), meaning "western, evening", and θηρίον (theríon), meaning "beast") is a genus of chalicothere from the Early to Middle Pleistocene of China. Along with Nestoritherium, it was one of the last of the chalicotheres to ever exist. It belonged to the subfamily Chalicotheriinae, which also includes Anisodon, Chalicotherium and Nestoritherium.

== Etymology ==
The genus name Hesperotherium comes from Ancient Greek ἕσπερος (hésperos), meaning "western, evening", and θηρίον (theríon), meaning "beast". The specific name means "from China".

== Palaeoecology ==
Hesperotherium would have coexisted with the proboscidean Sinomastodon, the giant ape Gigantopithecus, the pig Hippopotamodon, the mouse-deer Dorcabune, and the deer Cervavitus, as well as the pandas Ailuropoda wulingshanensis and Ailuropoda microta, the dhole Cuon antiquus, the tapir Tapirus sinensis and the proboscidean Stegodon. Other classic animals typically include orangutans, macaques, rhinos, hedgehogs, hyenas, horses, the cow Leptobos, pikas, the extinct pigs Sus xiaozhu and S. peii, muntjac, Cervus (a deer), gaur (a cow), the goat-antelope Megalovis, and more rarely the large saber-toothed cat Megantereon.
