= History of Chongqing =

The Chinese city of Chongqing has a history dating back at least 3,000 years.

== Prehistory ==
Evidence of human activity in Chongqing has been discovered dating back to the Paleolithic, approximately 20–30 thousand years ago. The fossils of a lower jawbone and teeth of an extinct non-hominin ape discovered near Wushan County in 1985 was originally thought to be a 2-million-year-old primitive human known as Wushan Man. This theory, originally proposed by Russell Ciochon, was reversed by the same scientist 15 years later – as it would have voided the "Recent African origin of modern humans" hypothesis. By the Neolithic era, the Daxi culture site (c. 4400 – c. 3300 BC) located in today's Wushan County in Chongqing belonged to the middle reaches of the Yangtze River culture. The Shaopengzui Culture site and culture found in today's Zhongxian County represent the indigenous culture of Chongqing in the late Neolithic period, contemporary with Shandong's Longshan Culture and the Liangzhu Culture in the Yangtze River Delta.

== Pre-unification ==
At the beginning of the Zhou dynasty in the 11th century BCE, the State of Ba was formed by the population of eastern Sichuan. However, this was no more than a loose confederation of independent clans which recognised a single king. During the Warring States period, the State of Ba fell into decline, until it was absorbed by the State of Qin in 316 BCE. It is unknown why the State of Ba fell so quickly into decline, but it is thought that due to a lack of unity, a powerful army could not be raised, leaving it open to attack by invaders.

== Imperial history ==
=== Qin and Han dynasties, Three Kingdoms period (221 BC – 280 AD) ===
In 316 BC, the state of Qin conquered Ba, bringing the Chongqing area under the control of various Central Plains dynasties. After the conquest, Qin established Ba Commandery in 314 BC, one of the 36 commanderies, with its seat in Jiangzhou (now Yuzhong District, Chongqing). In 206 BC, after Liu Bang of Han maintained the Qin system after seizing the Ba and Shu lands, and set up Ba Commandery. During the Eastern Han, Fuling and Badong Commanderies were added. A new city, North Prefecture City, was built in today's Jiangbei area, where the prefect of Ba Commandery sometimes worked.

The Three Kingdoms period left many legacies in the Chongqing area, including White Emperor City and Zhang Fei Temple. Many stories from Romance of the Three Kingdoms took place in what is now Chongqing.

=== Jin dynasty, Northern and Southern period (280–580) ===
After Cao Wei conquered Shu Han, Sichuan was divided into Yizhou and Liangzhou, with Chongqing under Liangzhou's jurisdiction. Subsequently, Chongqing belonged to the Western Jin, Northern Qin, Southern Song, Southern Liang, and Northern Zhou. During this period, the chaos in the Central Plains caused frequent population movements, significantly influencing Sichuan, with Chongqing at the forefront. Chongqing was known by several different names, including Jiangzhou, Ba Prefecture, Chu Prefecture (420–581), Yu Prefecture and Gong Prefecture during the Northern Song dynasty (960–1127).

=== Sui, Tang, and Song dynasties (581–1279) ===
In the first year of the Kaihuang era of Emperor Wen of Sui (581), Chuzhou was renamed to Yuzhou because the Yu River (the ancient name of the Jialing River) encircled the city. This is the origin of Chongqing's abbreviation Yu (渝).

During the Tang dynasty, the name Yuzhou was retained, and it was governed under the Shannan West Circuit.

The main city of Chongqing was under the jurisdiction of Kuizhou Roadduring the Song dynasty. As agriculture developed during the Song dynasty, the population of Chongqing rapidly expanded. Additionally, the area gradually developed into a major transportation hub connecting Sichuan with central China and the Jiangnan region, leading to a rapid growth in handicrafts. It was also during the Song that the name "Chongqing" originated and has continued to be used to this day. In 1102, Emperor Huizong of Song changed the name of Yuzhou to Gongzhou. The area was renamed Chongqing Fu by Prince Gong (the future Emperor Guangzong) in 1189. Chongqing (literally, 'redoubled celebration') was renamed as such by Emperor Guangzong as he was promoted from the ruler of a Zhou to a Fu (area of special importance) and also promoted from the position of a prince to Emperor Guangzong of the Song dynasty in the same year, hence the term 'redoubled celebration'.

=== Ming and Qing dynasties (1366–1912) ===
During the Ming and Qing dynasties, Chongqing Prefecture maintained its administrative structure despite political changes. In the Ming dynasty, after the fall of the Yuan Dynasty, Chongqing became an important regional center under different rulers.

In the Qing Dynasty, Chongqing Prefecture expanded its administrative reach, becoming a key political and economic hub in eastern Sichuan. The city's infrastructure, including its walls rebuilt by Dai Ding, shaped Chongqing's urban landscape for centuries.

In the early 20th century, particularly after the fall of the Qing dynasty in 1912, Chongqing continued to evolve. In 1891, the city's port was made open to the outside world, and a customs house was set up, marking its integration into global trade networks. In 1929, Chongqing was formally declared a city.

These additions provide a more comprehensive historical overview of Chongqing's name changes and its development during the Ming, Qing, and early 20th-century periods. They emphasize its role as a regional center under different ruling dynasties and its integration into international trade during the late Qing.

== Opening of Chongqing ==
In the second year of the Guangxu reign (1876 AD), citing the Margary Affair, Britain coerced the Qing government into signing the Treaty of Yantai, which stipulated in Article III, Clause 1: "Furthermore, the Chongqing Prefecture of Sichuan may have a British resident to oversee British commercial affairs. Before the arrival of steamships at Chongqing, British merchants and civilians are not allowed to reside or establish warehouses there. After the arrival of steamships, further arrangements can be negotiated," laying the groundwork for the formal opening of Chongqing. In March 1890, China and Britain signed the "Additional Articles to the Treaty of Yantai," which formally included a provision allowing "Chongqing to function as a treaty port, with no differences from other treaty ports. British merchants can transport goods between Yichang and Chongqing, either by hiring Chinese ships or using their own Chinese-style ships, as they prefer."

In 1895, following the Qing Dynasty's defeat in the First Sino-Japanese War, according to the Treaty of Shimonoseki signed in April of that year, the Qing government was required to open Chongqing (alongside Suzhou, Hangzhou, and Shashi) as a treaty port, marking Chongqing's engagement with the world.

In February 1898, after long preparation, British merchant Li Deluo piloted the steamship "Lichuan" to Chongqing, marking the first arrival of a steamship in Chongqing.

=== Political Activities in Late Qing ===
As early as 1897, reformist thinker and Sichuan's Song Yuren founded the first newspaper in Sichuan, "Yu Bao," advocating reformist ideas. "Yu Bao" ceased publication in April 1898. Revolutionary leader Zou Rong, author of "Revolutionary Army," was born in Chongqing, and today a street near Jiefangbei is named "Zou Rong Road."

In 1903, the first bourgeois revolutionary organization in Sichuan, Gong Qiang Hui, was established in Chongqing. In 1905, the Revolutionary Alliance was founded in Tokyo, Japan. Representatives from Gong Qiang Hui, Tong Xianzhang, and Chen Chonggong joined the Revolutionary Alliance in Tokyo under the command of Sun Yat-sen, returning to Chongqing to establish a branch of the Revolutionary Alliance.

== Republican era (1912–1949) ==
Following the Wuchang Uprising in 1911, responses emerged across the country. The Chongqing branch of the Revolutionary Alliance initiated an uprising, joining forces with the New Army led by Xia Zhishi to enter Chongqing on November 22, declaring Chongqing's independence. On November 23, the Sichuan Military Government was established, appointing Zhang Peijue of the Chongqing Revolutionary Alliance as the commander-in-chief and Xia Zhishi as the deputy commander-in-chief, marking Chongqing's entry into the Republic of China era.

In 1929, Chongqing was formally declared a city.

=== As wartime capital ===
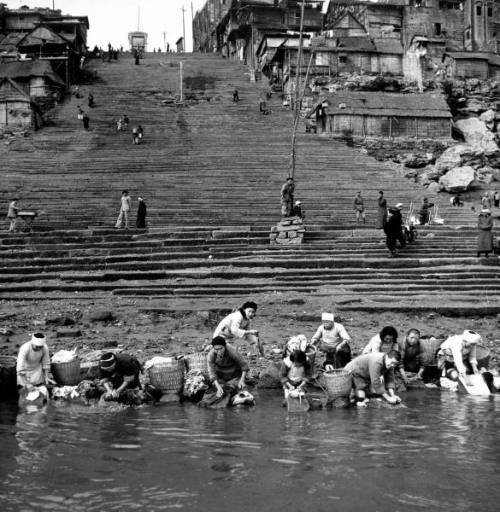
The mass migration from Chongqing in 1941

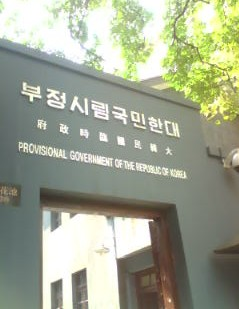
Former site of the Provisional Government of the Republic of Korea

After the outbreak of the Second Sino-Japanese War, with the frontline deteriorating, shortly after the start of the Battle of Shanghai, the Nationalist Army fell into passivity. To prevent chaos after the capital fell, the Republic of China government issued the "Declaration of the National Government's Relocation to Chongqing" on November 20, 1937, designating Chongqing as the wartime capital. On November 20, President Lin Sen of the National Government, following the plan to move the capital, ordered civilian and military officials to inventory important items such as the ROC flag and emblems, and left Nanjing for Chongqing overnight. Only 13 days later, Nanjing fell to the Japanese.

Chongqing officially became the capital on December 11, 1937.

- In September 1937, Liu Xiang's troops stationed in Chongqing attacked the Japanese concession and declared its recovery.
- In 1938, embassies of the United Kingdom, the United States, France, Belgium, Germany, and Switzerland were relocated to the Republic of China in Chongqing.
- In 1940, Chongqing was again designated as the permanent wartime capital.
- In December 1941, the government of the Republic of China declared war on Nazi Germany in Chongqing, leading to the closure of the German Embassy.
- In December 1941, the provisional government of the Republic of Korea relocated to Chongqing, with offices initially at Yangliu Street, Shibange, Wushiyeyao Lane No. 1, and Lianhuachi Street No. 38 (now the "Former Site of the Provisional Government of the Republic of Korea" for visiting).

As the wartime capital of China, Chongqing saw millions of migrants from the middle and lower reaches of the Yangtze basin from 1937 to 1944, including from Zhejiang, Hunan, Anhui, Hubei, Jiangsu, and Shanghai. This group was locally known as the "downriver people" in Chongqing. Meanwhile, thousands of enterprises, schools, and nearly 80,000 tons of gold were relocated to Chongqing, making it the political, economic, and cultural center of wartime China and the Far East command center for the anti-fascist war.

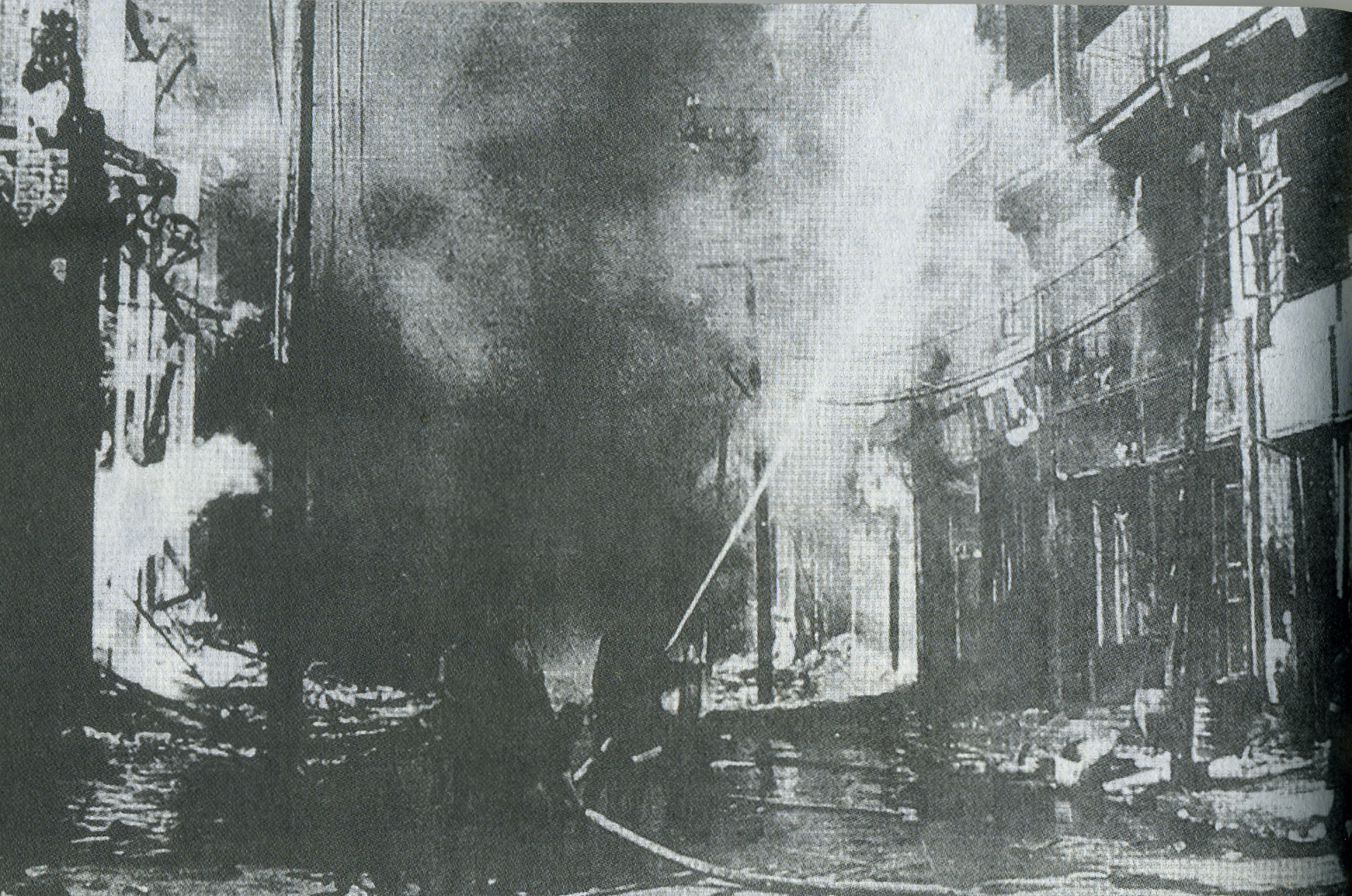
Chongqing after being bombed

During the war, Chongqing organized a total of 620,000 Sichuan soldiers, accounting for more than half of the total Sichuan forces, making it the main force of the Sichuan army. More than half of the 57 divisions that went out to fight were composed of soldiers from Chongqing.

Later, Chiang Kai-shek set up the "Spiritual Fortress" at the intersection of Zou Rong Road and May Fourth Road in Yuzhong District, declaring the determination of the National Government and the people of Chongqing to fight to the end, preferring to die in battle rather than surrender. In the People's Park in Yuzhong District, there is the Chongqing Firefighters Memorial Monument, and near the Urban Plaza at Linjiangmen, there is also a memorial site for the Bombing of Chongqing.

On June 5, 1941, 7,764 civilians suffocated to death in a public air raid shelter in Yuzhong District, while sheltering from a Japanese carpet bombing. The event became known as the "Tunnel Massacre", and was the single deadliest day in Chongqing during its tenure as the capital over three years.

According to incomplete statistics from the 1980s, there are nearly 400 relics of the wartime capital in Chongqing. With decades of large-scale construction, some sites no longer exist. The remaining representative sites mainly fall into two categories: residences of key figures such as Chiang Kai-shek and Soong Mei-ling, and memorial sites related to the cooperation between the Kuomintang and the Chinese Communist Party in Chongqing, such as the Chongqing Negotiations and the signing site of the Double Tenth Agreement. The Huangshan National Government Site and Presidential Residence on Nanshan Mountain in Chongqing, and the Hongyan Village site in Yuzhong District are well-preserved and relatively concentrated cultural relic sites of Chongqing's wartime history.

In 1946, the seat of government was moved back to Nanjing. After the founding of the People's Republic of China in 1949, Chongqing remained the cultural and economic centre of southwestern China. After the founding of the People's Republic of China in 1949, Chongqing remained the cultural and economic centre of southwestern China.

== People's Republic (1983 – present) ==
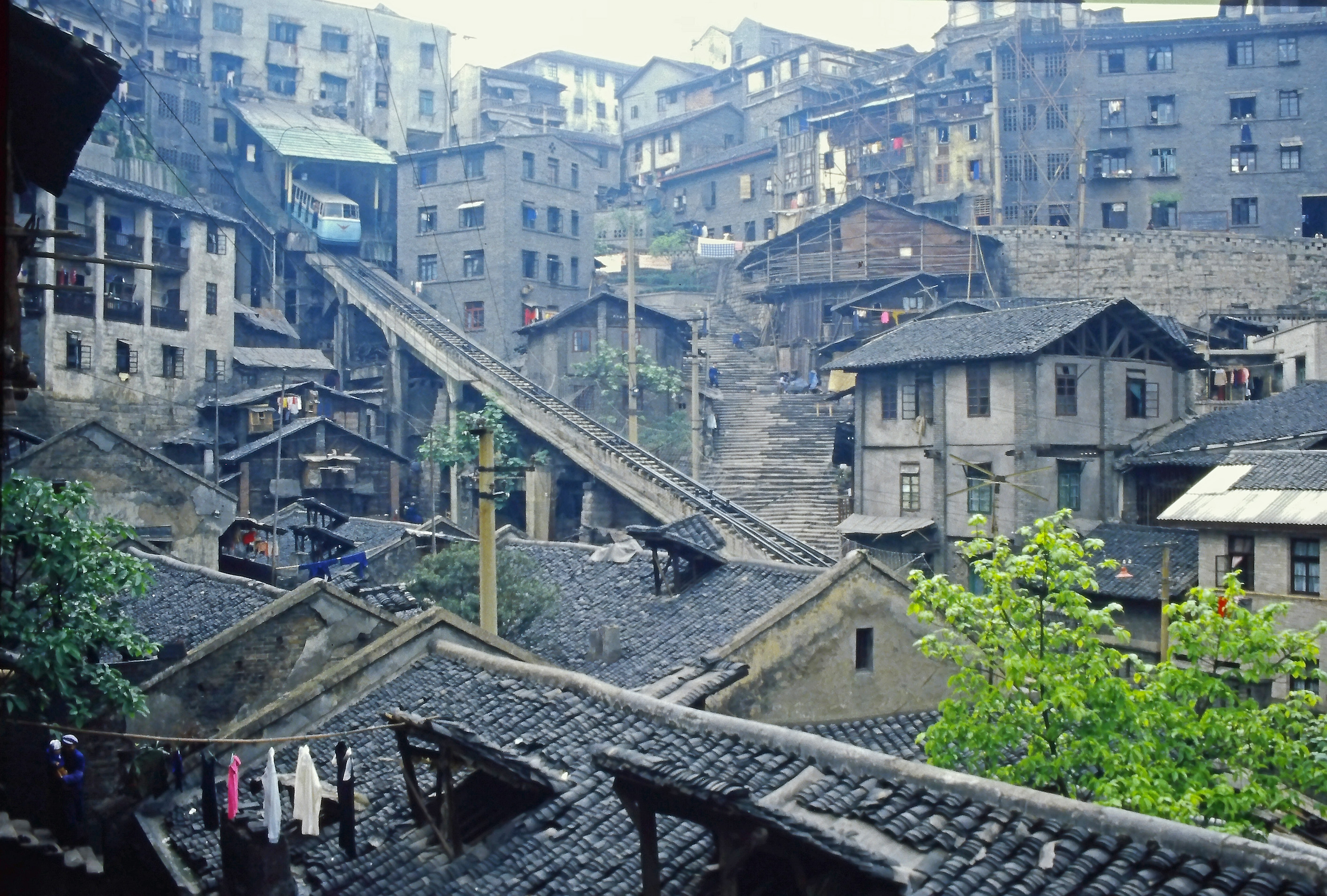
Chongqing in 1987.

In 1983, the economic reforms effected by Deng Xiaoping were trialled in the city. In 1997 Chongqing became the one of four municipalities directly under the central government in China, and the only one in western China.

A drought affected the area in the summer of 2022, with the Yangtze River dropping to levels unseen in decades if not centuries. It was accompanied by a sustained heatwave with temperatures up to 45 °C and remaining in the high 30s overnight, with the city becoming at the forefront of an unrelenting heatwave across a large part of China, including the Sichuan Basin.

== See also ==
- History of China
