= Wushan Man =

Fossil of an extinct non-hominin ape of central China from 2 mya

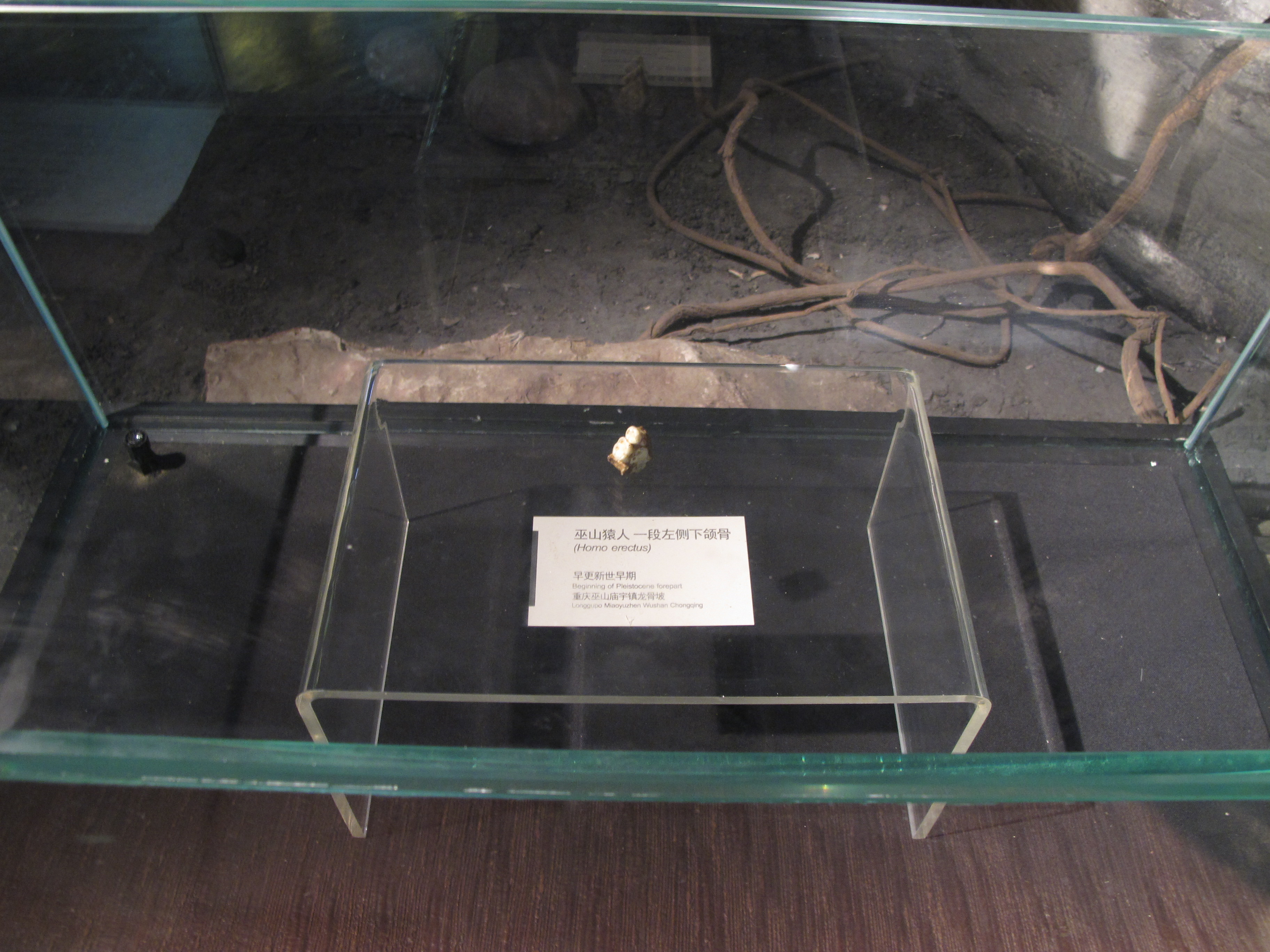
- Wushan Man fossil at Three Gorges Museum
- Common name: Wushan Man
- Species: Hominidae, species uncertain
- Age: 2 million years
- Place discovered: Chongqing, China
- Date discovered: 1985

Wushan Man (Chinese: 巫山人; pinyin: Wūshānrén, literally "Shaman Mountain Man") is a set of fossilised remains of an extinct, undetermined non-hominin ape found in central China in 1985. The remains are dated to around 2 million years ago and were originally considered to represent a subspecies of Homo erectus (H. e. wushanensis).

The fossils were found in 1985 in Longgupo (龙骨坡 or "Dragon Bone Slope"), Zhenlongping Village, Miaoyu Town of Wushan County, Chongqing in the Three Gorges.

== Background ==
=== 1984–1988: Discovery ===
The "Dragon Bone Slope" at Longgupo was discovered as a site containing fossils in 1984. From 1985 to 1988, it was excavated by a team of Chinese scientists, led by Huang Wanpo from the Institute of Vertebrate Paleontology and Paleoanthropology in Beijing and the Chongqing National Museum (Sichuan Province).

In 1986, three fore-teeth and a left mandible with two molars were unearthed along with animal fossils including teeth from the extinct large ape Gigantopithecus and pygmy giant panda Ailuropoda microta. Excavations from 1997 to 2006 have found additional stone tools and animal fossils including remains of 120 species of vertebrates, 116 of which are mammals. This suggests that the fossils originally existed in a subtropical forest environment. Remains of Sinomastodon, Nestoritherium, Equus yunnanensis, Ailuropoda microta in the jaw suggested that its remains belonged to the earliest part of the Pleistocene or late Pliocene.

Early reports of these excavation in Chinese journals did not garner attention outside of China. In 1992, Russell Ciochon was invited to Longgupo to examine and provide a reliable age for the jaw. In 1995, Ciochon then published the findings in the journal Nature, which brought attention to the fossils on a global scale.

=== Initial doubts ===
In a 1995 Science report, several doubts about the specimens were raised. Upon seeing the specimens on a trip to China, Milford Wolpoff of the University of Michigan is not convinced that the partial jaw is a hominin. He believed that the fossils might have belonged of an orangutan or Pongo, based on the shape of the missing neighboring tooth of a preserved premolar. Jeffrey Schwartz and Ian Tattersall also published a claim in Nature that the teeth found in Longgupo were those of an orangutan. However, it was found that the teeth did not fit in the range of variation of those found in orangutans, which ruled out this possibility.

More recently, it had been argued that the jaw fragment was indistinguishable from Late Miocene-Pliocene Chinese apes of the genus Lufengpithecus. The incisor was found to be more consistent with that of an East Asian person, who may have accidentally entered the fissure of the Longgupo Cave deposits because of natural forces such as flowing water.

== Retraction ==
In the 18 June 2009 issue of Nature, Russell Ciochon who first reported the jaw fragment from Longgupo as human, announced his retraction of the findings. He is convinced that the Longgupo fossil do not belong to a pre-erectus human, but rather to unknown apes that originated from primal forests in Pleistocene Southeast Asia. He mentioned that H. erectus arrived in Asia about 1.6 million years ago, but steered clear of the forest in pursuit of grassland game, which means that the pre-erectus species did not appear in southeast Asia.

Russell Ciochon no longer believes that Gigantopithecus and H. erectus coexisted in the same environment—an argument he had previously made in his book 1990 Other Origins: The Search for the Giant Ape in Human Prehistory. He states:

Without the assumption that Gigantopithecus and H. erectus lived together, everything changed: if early humans were not part of the Stegodon–Ailuropoda fauna, I had to envision a chimpanzee-sized ape in its place — either a descendant of Lufengpithecus, or a previously unknown ape genus.^{p. 911}

A key factor in changing his opinion about the fossil was a 2005 visit to the Guangxi Natural History Museum in Nanning, where he examined a large number of primate teeth from the Pleistocene. He believes that early humans hunted mammals on grasslands and did not live in sub-tropic forests that existed at Longgupo in that period, making it impossible for the set of fossils to have belonged to a human. While Russell Ciochon no longer believes the jaw to belonged to a human, he still claims that the two stone tools found with fossils were created by humans. However, according to him, "They must have been more recent additions to the site."^{p. 911}

Jeffrey Schwartz, one of the critics of the original claim, found Ciochon's retraction astonishing since it is not a common occurrence that a scientist announces a retraction after changing his mind, praising the openness as something positive.

== Importance ==
The discovery of the Wushan Man and its related materials such as stone various vertebrate fossils, and stone artifacts such as cores, points, scrapers, drilling tools, etc. show evidence of human agency. This is important because it suggests that the creators of these tools have made the change from tool-using to tool-making.

According to Nature:

The new evidence suggests that hominids entered Asia before 2 Myr, coincident with the earliest diversification of genus Homo in Africa. Clearly, the first hominid to arrive in Asia was a species other than true H. erectus, and one that possessed a stone-based technology. A pre-erectus hominid in China as early as 1.9 Myr provides the most likely antecedents for the in situ evolution of Homo erectus in Asia.^{p. 278}

This makes its status as a Homo fossil critically important to the study of human origins as it suggests that H. erectus was not the first human species to leave Africa and supports the argument made by some that H. erectus evolved in Asia instead of Africa. The discovery of Homo floresiensis is significant to this theory of pre-erectus hominin evolving in Asia. Recent research finds that its wrist and foot bones are anatomically like those of H. habilis or Australopithecus. Evidence for pre-erectus Homo in Asia would be consistent with such a possible origin.

A middle school textbook, The Chinese History (published by People's Education Press), has plans to include the discovery of "Wushan Man" as a part of its content.

== See also ==
- Lantian Man
- Peking Man
- Red Deer Cave people
- Tianyuan man
- Yuanmou Man
- Zhoukoudian
