= Giant panda (disambiguation) =

The giant panda (Ailuropoda melanoleuca) is a bear native to south central China.

Giant panda may also refer to:

== Animals ==
- Giant panda snail Hedleyella falconeri
- Ailuropoda (genus), the genus of the giant panda
  - Pygmy giant panda Ailuropoda microta
  - Qinling panda (Ailuropoda melanoleuca qinlingensis), a subspecies of the giant panda

== Places ==
- Giant Panda National Park, China
- Macao Giant Panda Pavilion, Macau, China

== Arts and entertainment ==
- Giant Panda (group), an American hip-hop group
- Giant Panda Guerilla Dub Squad, an American reggae and jam band

== Other uses ==
- Face of the giant panda sign or "giant panda" or "panda face", a pattern found in MRI scans of brains

== See also ==
- Panda (disambiguation)
- Pandas (disambiguation)
- Red Panda (disambiguation)
- Giant (disambiguation)
