= Mrs. Panda =

Mrs. Panda may refer to:

- Mrs. Panda, a character from Sherlock Yack
- Mrs. Panda, a character from Peppa Pig

== See also ==
- Panda (disambiguation)
- Pandas (disambiguation)
