= Pongo weidenreichi =

Chinese orangutan Temporal range: Middle Pleistocene–Late Pleistocene

Scientific classification
- Kingdom: Animalia
- Phylum: Chordata
- Class: Mammalia
- Infraclass: Placentalia
- Order: Primates
- Superfamily: Hominoidea
- Family: Hominidae
- Genus: Pongo
- Species: †P. weidenreichi

Binomial name
- †Pongo weidenreichi Hooijer, 1948

Synonyms
- P. hooijeri Schwartz, Long, Cuong, Kha & Tattersall, 1995; P. pygmaeus weidenreichi (Hooijer, 1948); P. pygmaeus ciochoni (Schwartz, Long, Cuong, Kha & Tattersall, 1995); P. pygmaeus fromageti (Schwartz, Long, Cuong, Kha & Tattersall, 1995); P. pygmaeus kahlkei (Schwartz, Long, Cuong, Kha & Tattersall, 1995)

Extinct species of orangutan

The Chinese orangutan (Pongo weidenreichi) is an extinct species of orangutan from the Pleistocene of South China and possibly Southeast Asia.

== Description ==
The dental dimensions of P. weidenreichi are approximately 20% bigger than those of living orangutans.

== Distribution ==
P. weidenreichi is known from fossil teeth found in the Sanhe Cave, as well as the Baikong, Juyuan, and Queque Caves in Chongzuo, Guangxi. The youngest known remains of the species date to between 66,000 and 57,000 years ago in Yincun Cave, Guangxi. An isolated canine from Thẩm Khuyên Cave, Vietnam, and a fourth premolar from Pha Bong, Thailand, could possibly be assigned to Gigantopithecus, though these could also represent Pongo weidenreichi. Two possible teeth previously attributed to Gigantopithecus from the Late Pleistocene deposit from Vietnam have been subsequently suggested to represent P. weidenreichi instead.

According to a 2025 study by Liang et al., in southern China, P. weidenreichi was ecologically replaced by a smaller Pongo species, Pongo devosi, by the late Middle Pleistocene, approximately 184,000 years ago.

== Palaeoecology ==
The dental microwear of P. weidenreichi reveals that it lived in forests and predominantly consumed soft fruits. P. weidenreichi had exceptionally similar dental microwear patterns to P. devosi, suggesting the latter species was likewise a frugivorous inhabitant of forested environments and that the two species did not differ substantially in their ecology.

In southern China during the Middle-Late Pleistocene, orangutans formed part of the "Ailuropoda-Stegodon fauna" alongside animals both living in the region today as well as those that are extinct, including the giant panda ancestor Ailuropoda baconi, the Asian elephant (Elephas maximus), the "giant tapir" (Tapirus augustus), the extinct elephant-relative Stegodon orientalis, the Sumatran rhinoceros (Dicerorhinus sumatrensis), the extinct rhinoceros Rhinoceros sinensis (which may in reality actually represent the living Indian rhinoceros, Rhinoceros unicornis), wild boar (Sus scrofa), muntjac, water buffalo, sika deer (Cervus nippon), gibbons (Hylobates), tigers (Panthera tigris), and the extinct cave hyena (Crocuta ultima).
