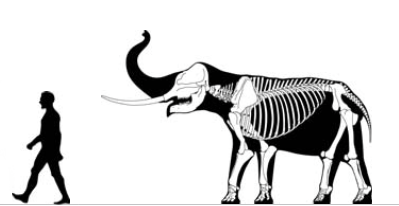
- Skeletal restoration

Scientific classification
- Kingdom: Animalia
- Phylum: Chordata
- Class: Mammalia
- Infraclass: Placentalia
- Order: Proboscidea
- Family: †Gomphotheriidae
- Genus: †Sinomastodon; Tobien et al., 1986

Type species
- †Sinomastodon intermedius Tobien et al., 1986

Species
- S. bumiajuensis Van der Maarel, 1932; S. hanjiangensis Tang et Zong, 1987; S. intermedius (Teilhard and Trassaert, 1937); S. jiangnanensis Wang et al. 2012; S. praeintermedius Wang et al., 2016; S. sendaicus Matsumoto, 1924; S. yangziensis (Chow, 1959)

= Sinomastodon =

Sinomastodon Temporal range: Late Miocene–Early Pleistocene

Extinct genus of gomphothere proboscidean

Sinomastodon ("Chinese mastodon") is an extinct gomphothere proboscidean known from the Late Miocene to Early Pleistocene of Asia, including China, Japan, Thailand, Myanmar, Indonesia and probably in Kashmir Valley, India.

== Description ==
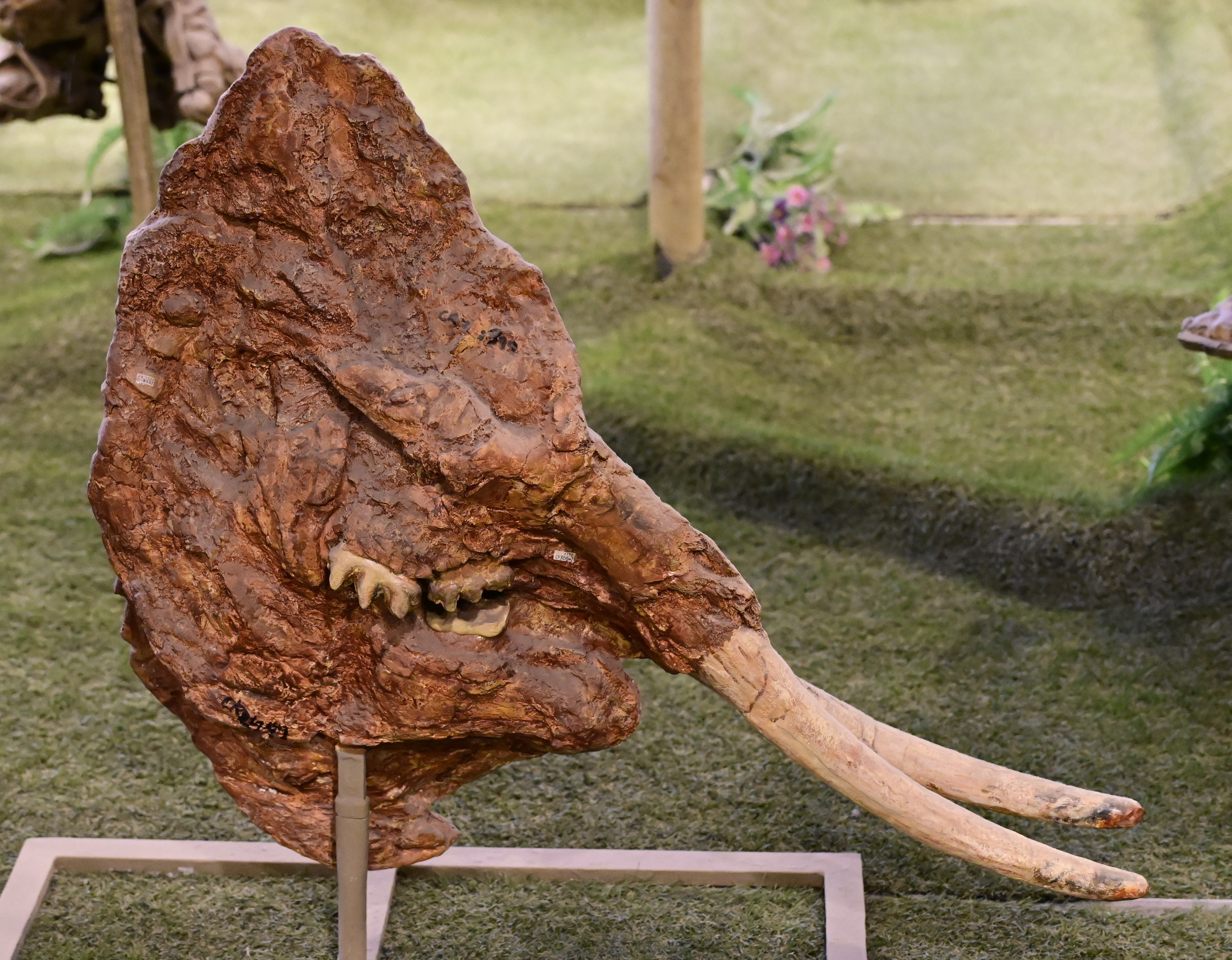
Skull of S. yangziensis, Paleozoological Museum of China

Sinomastodon, in comparison to earlier gomphotheres, had a shortened (brevirostrine) lower jaw that lacked permanent tusks/incisors. The skull was proportionally relatively short. The upper tusks, which are circular in cross-section, are upward curving and lack enamel bands. The molar teeth were triolophodont and bunodont. One individual of S. hanjiangensis, suggested to about 30-years-old, is estimated to have been about 2.07 metres (6.8 ft) tall and weighed 2.1 tonnes (4,600 lb).

== Taxonomy and evolution ==
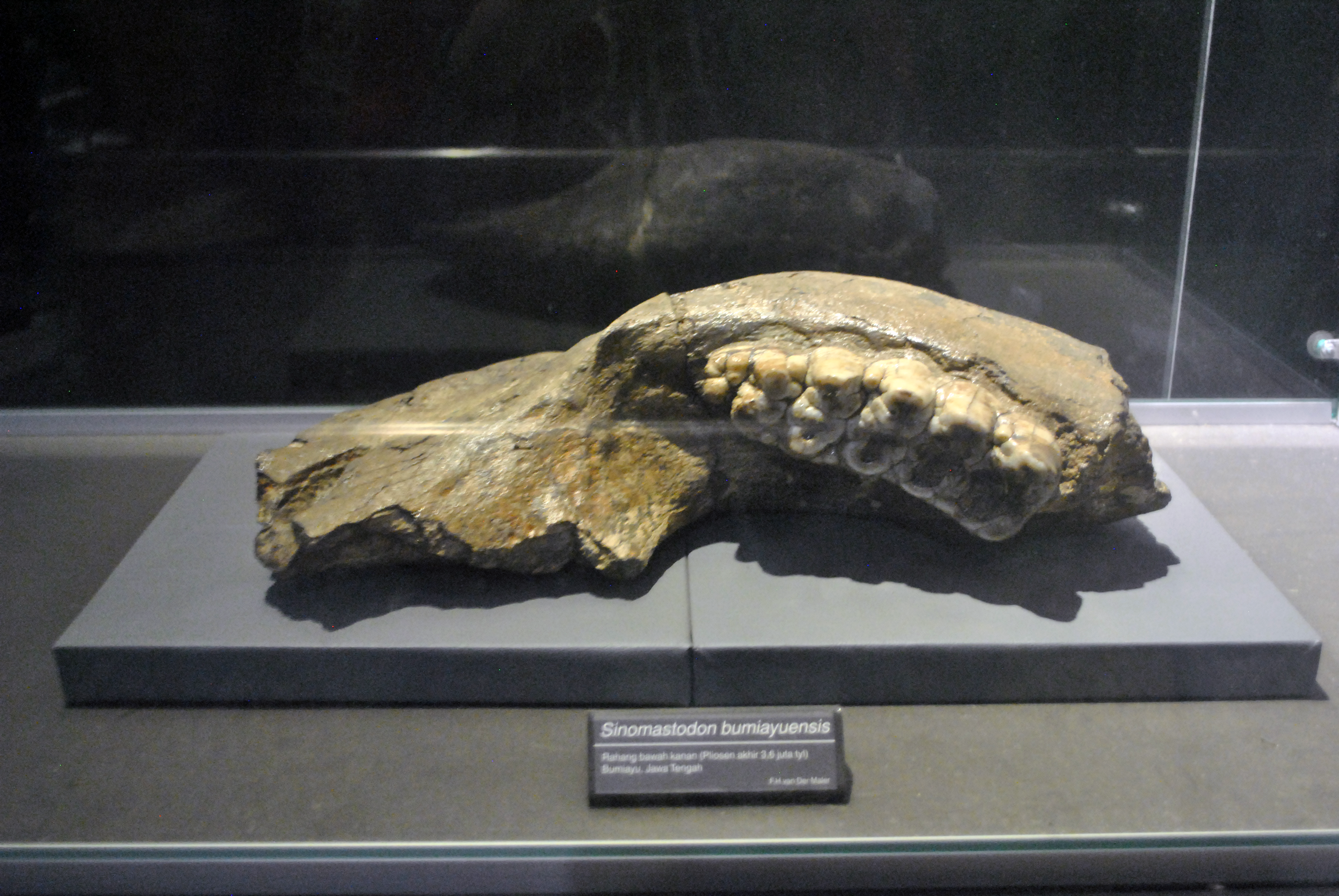
Sinomastodon bumiajuensis right jaw fossil from Bumiayu, Central Java, in display at the Bandung Geological Museum

The taxonomic position of Sinomastodon is disputed. Some authors suggest that Sinomastodon originated from North American gomphotheres that migrated into Asia. Position according to Mothé et al. 2016 supporting this hypothesis, showing Sinomastodon nested amongst North American gomphotheres:

- †Gomphotheriidae (Gomphotheres)
  - †Gomphotherium
  - - †Gnathabelodon
    - - †Eubelodon
      - Brevirostrine clade
        - †Stegomastodon
        - - †Sinomastodon
          - - †Notiomastodon
            - - †Rhynchotherium
              - †Cuvieronius

However, the molar teeth of the earliest Sinomastodon species from the Late Miocene are zygodont, a morphology unknown in North American gomphotheres. Therefore, is it is alternatively suggested that it derived from an Asian species of Gomphotherium, such as G. subtapiroideum or G. wimani.

The earliest members of the genus appeared during the Late Miocene, at least as early as 6-6.5 million years ago in China, assigned to the species Sinomastodon praeintermedius. Other Chinese species of Sinomastodon include Sinomastodon intermedius, known from the Early Pliocene of North China. as well as S. jiangnanensis, known from a skull from Renzidong Cave, Anhui Province, dating to the Early Pleistocene, approximately 2.15 million years ago. Other remains of the genus are known from Late Miocene-Early Pliocene of Japan, assigned to the species Sinomastodon sendaicus (of which the Chinese S. intermedius may be a junior synonym), as well as the island of Java in Indonesia, assigned to the species Sinomastodon bumiajuensis, spanning much of the Early Pleistocene from around 2 to 1.1 million years ago, Material of indeterminate species of Sinomastodon are known from Thailand, of an uncertain but possibly Early Pleistocene age, from Myanmar, of probably late Miocene age, and probably from Kashmir in the northern Indian subcontinent, of uncertain but possibly late Early Pleistocene age. The youngest members of the genus are known from the end of the Early Pleistocene, around 800,000 years ago in southern China, which are assigned to the species Sinomastodon yangziensis (which spans around 2.15-0.8 million years ago).

== Diet ==
Specimens of Sinomastodon from the Early Pleistocene of South China (S. jiangnanensis, S. yangziensis) are suggested to have had browsing diet based on dental microwear analysis, while Sinomastodon bumiajuensis from the Early Pleistocene of Java is suggested based on stable carbon isotope analysis to have been a variable feeder, with the majority of specimens found to have a predominantly grazing diet.

== Ecology ==
In the Early Pleistocene of South China, Sinomastodon lived alongside the giant panda ancestors Ailuropoda microta and its successor Ailuropoda wulingshanensis, the giant ape Gigantopithecus, orangutans (Pongo) the large tapir Tapirus sinensis, the fellow proboscideans Stegodon preorientalis and S. huananensis, the chevrotain Dorcabune, the chalicothere Nestoritherium, the deer Cervavitus the bovids Megalovis and Bibos, the giant hyena Pachycrocuta, the sabertooth cat Megantereon, and the archaic dhole Cuon antiquus. In the Early Pleistocene of Java, Sinomastodon bumiajuensis lived alongside the hippopotamus Hexaprotodon sivajavanicus, the proboscidean Stegodon trigonocephalus and a smaller unnamed pygmy Stegodon species, the dwarf elephant Stegoloxodon indonesicus, the Javan rhinoceros (Rhinoceros sondaicus), deer, and the giant tortoise Megalochelys.
