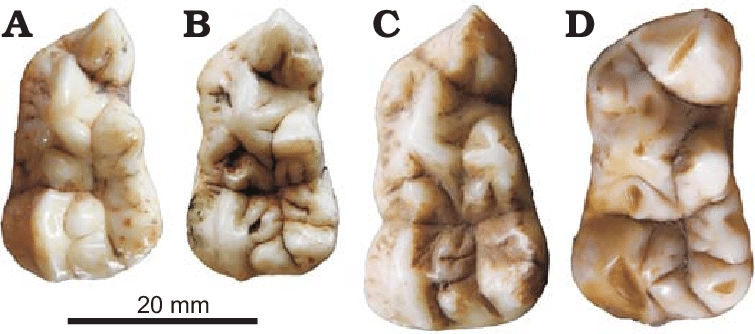

Scientific classification
- Kingdom: Animalia
- Phylum: Chordata
- Class: Mammalia
- Infraclass: Placentalia
- Order: Carnivora
- Family: Ursidae
- Genus: Ailuropoda
- Species: A. wulingshanensis

Binomial name
- Ailuropoda wulingshanensis (Wang et al., 1982)

= Ailuropoda wulingshanensis =

Ailuropoda wulingshanensis Temporal range: Early Pleistocene, 1.8–1.2 Ma

Extinct species of panda

Ailuropoda wulingshanensis is an extinct species of bear belonging to the giant panda (Ailuropoda) lineage that existed during the Early Pleistocene. It succeeded the earlier Ailuropoda microta, and in turn was succeeded by the later Ailuropoda baconi.

== Distribution ==
Ailuropoda wulingshanensis is known only from South China. It is best represented at Longgu Cave in Jianshi, Hubei, and its fossils have also been recovered from Bailong Cave. The species existed during the Early Pleistocene, around 1.8-1.2 million years ago.

== Description ==
Ailuropoda wulingshanensis was considerably smaller than the living giant panda, with an estimated average body mass of approximately 70–90 kilograms (150–200 lb) for individuals from Longgu Cave. Ailuropoda wulingshanensis is distinguished from the earlier Ailuropoda microta by its larger size and more complex cuspation of premolars, and from its successor Ailuropoda baconi by its smaller size and less developed premolar cuspation.

== Palaeoecology ==
A. wulingshanensis had the lowest δ^{13}C enamel values of the entire Longgu Cave fauna, suggesting a diet extremely heavy in C_{3} plants. Other animals found in contemporaneous deposits include the giant ape Gigantopithecus, orangutans (Pongo) the large tapir Tapirus sinensis, the elephant relative Stegodon, the gomphothere Sinomastodon, the chevrotain Dorcabune, the bovids Megalovis and Bibos, and the archaic dhole Cuon antiquus.

== Taxonomy ==
Ailuropoda wulingshanensis is suggested to be part of a potential succession of chronospecies, increasing in size from its ancestor Ailuropoda microta to Ailuropoda wulingshanensis and again to its descendant Ailuropoda baconi, before declining to Ailuropoda melanoleuca.
