= Tingyao =

In Chinese mythology, Tingyao (Chinese: 听𫍚; Chinese: 聼訞; pinyin: Tīngyāo) from the Sangshui (桑水, "Sang River") clan was the wife of Shennong (Emperor Yan). According to the ancient text Classic of Mountains and Seas, she came from Chi River (赤水, "Red River") and gave birth to Yanju (炎居), who was Zhurong's great-grandfather.

In Classic of Mountains and Seas, Emperor Yan also had two daughters: Yaoji and Nüwa (who later became a bird named Jingwei).
