= Red Panda =

A red panda (Ailurus fulgens) is a small mammal native to the eastern Himalayas and southwestern China.

Red Panda can also refer to:

- Red Panda (acrobat) (born 1970/1971), Chinese-American acrobat
- Red Panda Records, a record label active in the 2000s
- Red Panda Village, Zoo Knoxville, Knoxville, Tennessee, USA
- Red Panda FC (Namchi, Sikkim, India), a soccer team in the Sikkim Premier League
- Red Panda (superhero), a character from the Canadian radio drama Red Panda Adventures
- The Red Panda, a comic book from MonkeyBrain Books
- Red Panda (band), a U.S. band, a successor band to Home Grown

== See also ==
- Giant panda (disambiguation)
- Panda (disambiguation)
- Panda Bear (disambiguation)
- Red (disambiguation)
- Udo the Red Panda, the mascot of sports teams for the University of Mannheim, Germany
