= Yaoji =

Chinese goddess

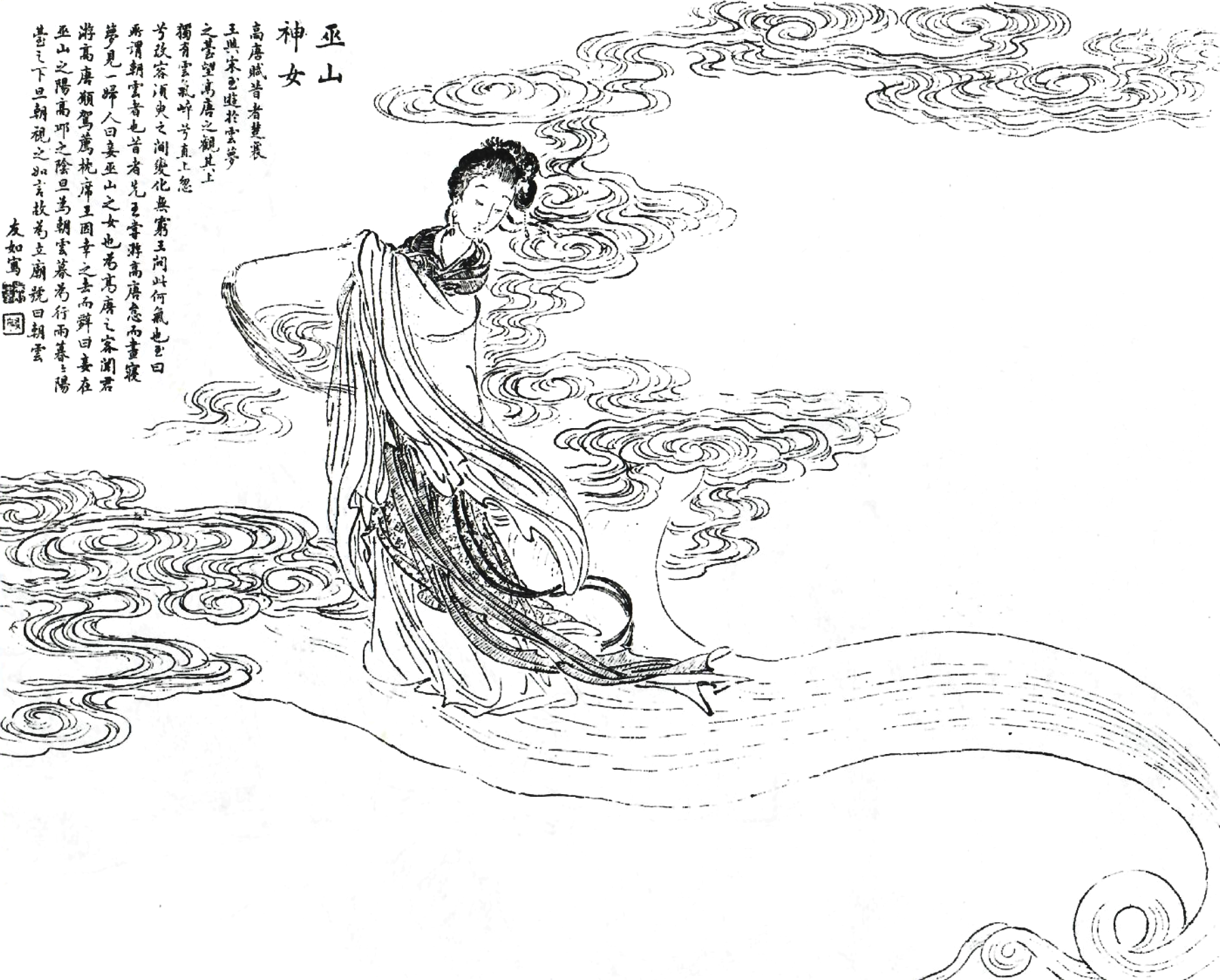
Yaoji in a Qing dynasty illustration

Yaoji (Chinese: 瑶姬), also known as the Wushan goddess (巫山神女), is a goddess of Mount Wu (Wushan) in Chinese mythology. Some traditions describe her as a daughter of the Yan Emperor. In the Daoist Yongcheng Jixianlu, she is called Yunhua Furen (雲華夫人) and is the twenty-third daughter of the Queen Mother of the West.

Yaoji is sometimes confused with Yunhua, the mother of Erlang Shen. In the Erlang Baojuan, Erlang Shen's mother is called Yunhua Nü (云花女), while the Yongcheng Jixianlu describes Yaoji as Yunhua Furen. The two figures are also combined in some modern adaptations, including the television series The Prelude of Lotus Lantern (宝莲灯前传).

== Legends ==
=== Yaoji ===
The Classic of Mountains and Seas tells of an emperor's daughter named Nüshi (女尸) who died at Guyao Mountain (姑媱之山). After her death, she became a plant called yaocao (䔄草). The plant had yellow flowers, and anyone who ate it would become attractive to others. The text does not give her the name Yaoji.

In the Water Classic Commentary, Yaoji is the youngest daughter of the Heavenly Emperor. She dies before marriage and is buried on the southern side of Wushan. Her spirit becomes a plant called lingzhi. She is also identified as the goddess who appears in the story of the King of Chu.

=== Yunhua and Yu the Great ===
In the Daoist Yongcheng Jixianlu (墉城集仙錄), compiled by Du Guangting, Yunhua is the twenty-third daughter of the Queen Mother of the West. Her name is Yaoji, and she is the younger sister of Taizhen Wang Furen (太真王夫人).

On her way back from the Eastern Sea, Yunhua stops at Wushan. Yu the Great is working to control the floods nearby. When a strong wind causes rocks to fall from the mountains, Yu asks her for help. She has an attendant give him a book for summoning gods and spirits. She also sends several divine beings to help him break through the rocks and clear the waterways.

Yu later visits Yunhua on a mountain peak. She changes into a stone, a cloud, rain, a dragon, and a crane. Yu doubts that she is a true immortal, but one of her attendants explains her powers. Yunhua had studied under the Three Primes (三元道君) and received Daoist scriptures. She was given the title Yunhua Shanggong Furen (雲華上宮夫人).

When Yu visits her again, she gives him further teachings and another sacred text to help him control the floods. With the help of the divine beings Gengchen and Yuyu, Yu completes his work.

=== Local traditions ===
A folk tale from Wushan County tells that Yaoji became a mortal woman and married a fisherman named Jiang Sheng (江生). One day, Jiang Sheng went fishing during a storm and never returned. Yaoji waited for him on a high peak overlooking the river. She remained there for many years until she turned into stone. The stone is now known as Goddess Peak (神女峰).

Another local story tells how Yaoji helped Yu the Great control the floods. The Book-Giving Platform (授书台), at the foot of Feifeng Peak, is said to be the place where she gave Yu a divine book. The platform stands across the river from Goddess Peak.

== In literature and poetry ==
The Gaotang fu (高唐赋) and Shennu fu (神女赋), traditionally believed to be by Song Yu, tell of the Wushan goddess and the King of Chu. In the Gaotang fu, an earlier king of Chu dreams of a woman who calls herself the goddess of Wushan. Before leaving, she tells him that she becomes a cloud in the morning and rain in the evening. The king then orders a shrine to be built for her. The Shennu fu describes another dream of the goddess and her beauty.

The goddess also appears in Tang poetry. Du Fu mentions her in his poem Yonghuai guji (咏怀古迹). Liu Fangping wrote Wushan Shennü (巫山神女), which describes the goddess as a cloud and rain and recalls her meeting with the King of Chu.

Li Bai wrote about Yaoji in his poem Ganxing (感兴). He calls her the daughter of the Heavenly Emperor and describes her becoming a morning cloud. The poem also tells of her entering a dream at night. Its final line, "虚传宋玉文", questions Song Yu's account of the goddess.

Li Bai also wrote Guan Yuan Danqiu zuo Wushan pingfeng (观元丹丘坐巫山屏风), about a painted screen showing Wushan. The poem mentions the King of Chu and the goddess, as well as the story of Yangtai.

Liu Yuxi wrote Wushan Shennü miao (巫山神女庙), a poem about the goddess's temple and the stone on the mountain that resembles a woman.

The Tang poet Li Xun also wrote about her in his Wushan yiduan yun (巫山一段云). The poem mentions her shrine and the story of the King of Chu.

== Worship ==
The Wushan goddess was worshipped at Ningzhen Temple (凝真观) near Wushan. She was also known by the Daoist title Miaoyong Zhenren (妙用真人).

The Southern Song poet Lu You visited the temple and recorded his visit in the Ru Shu Ji (入蜀记). He wrote that Miaoyong Zhenren was the goddess commonly known as the Wushan goddess. The temple stood opposite the mountains, with several of the Twelve Peaks visible from its grounds. Behind the shrine was a stone platform where Yu the Great was said to have received a divine book from the goddess.

The Southern Song writer Fan Chengda also visited the shrine. In his Wu Chuan Lu (吴船录), he recorded an inscription describing Yaoji as the daughter of the Queen Mother of the West. The inscription said that she helped Yu the Great clear the waterways and had received the title Miaoyong Zhenren. He also recorded the name Ningzhen Temple and mentioned a White Horse General (白马将军) worshipped there.

Historical gazetteers also record the shrine and the traditions about Yaoji and Yu the Great.
