= Pandas (disambiguation) =

The giant panda (Ailuropoda melanoleuca) is a bear from the family Ursidae.

Pandas may also refer to:

== Places ==
- Pandas, Iran, a village in Isfahan Province, Iran

== Science and technology ==
- PANDAS, pediatric autoimmune neuropsychiatric disorders associated with streptococcal infections
- PANDAS (Pandora Digital Archiving System), used to manage the Pandora Archive in Australia
- pandas (software), an open source data analysis library for Python
- Pan-Andromeda Archaeological Survey (PAndAS)

== Sports ==
- Rotterdam Pandas, a professional ice hockey team
- Alberta Pandas, the University of Alberta women's athletic teams

== See also ==
- Giant panda (disambiguation)
- Panda (disambiguation)
- Pandan (disambiguation)
