= Wushan =

Wushan may refer to the following locations in the People's Republic of China:

- Wushan County, Chongqing (巫山县)
  - Wu Mountains, or Wushan (巫山), mountainous region
- Wushan County, Gansu (武山县), county of Tianshui City, Gansu
- Wushan, Lechang (五山), town of Lechang, Guangdong
- Wushan, Shandong (吾山), town of Anqiu, Shandong
- Wushan Subdistrict, Guangzhou (五山街道), subdistrict in Tianhe District, Guangzhou, Guangdong
- Wushan Subdistrict, Changsha (乌山街道), subdistrict in Wangcheng District, Changsha, Hunan
- Wushan, Sui County (吴山镇), town in Sui County, Suizhou, Hubei, China

== See also ==
- Wushan Man
