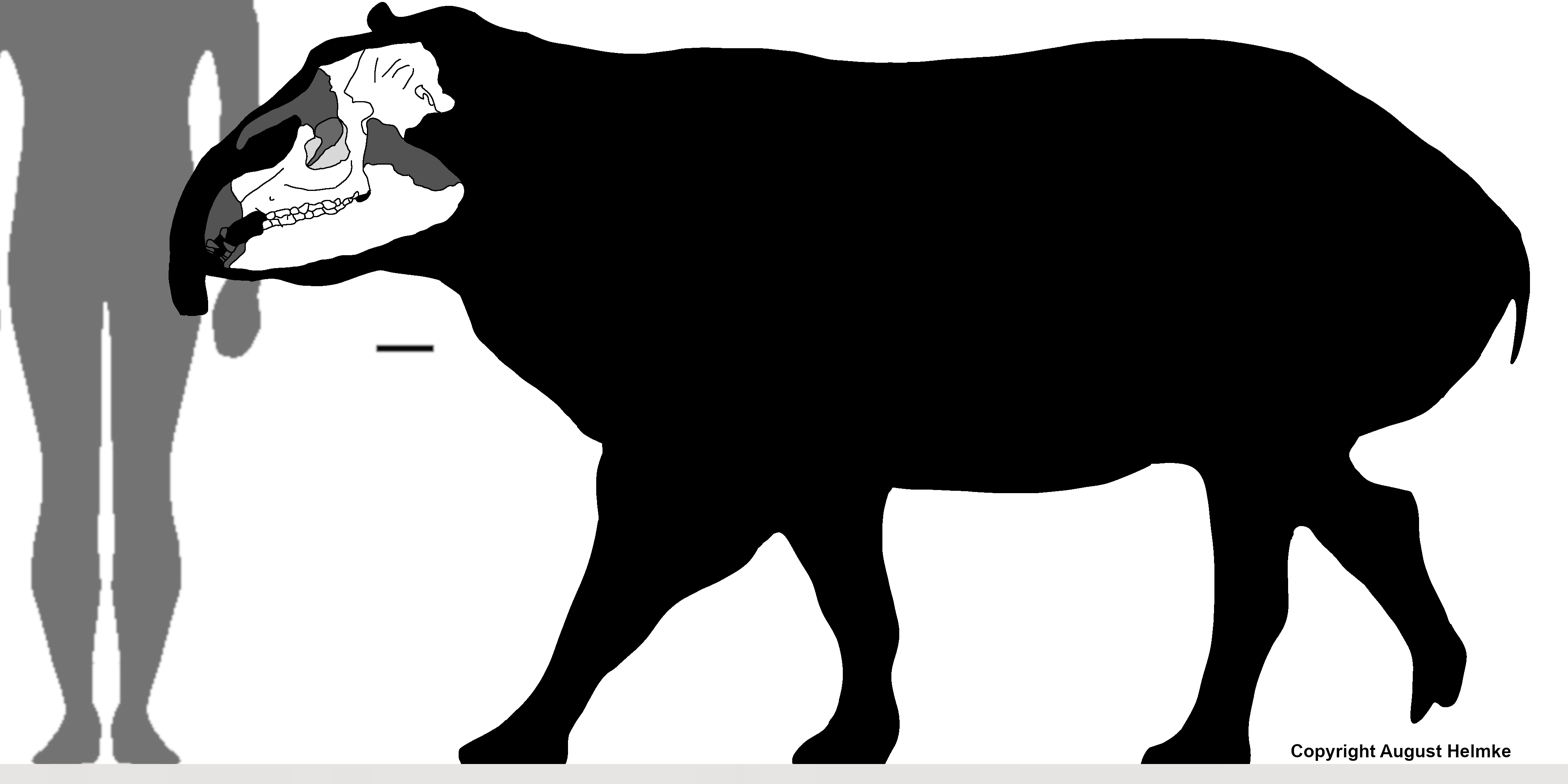
- Skeletal reconstruction of the holotype.
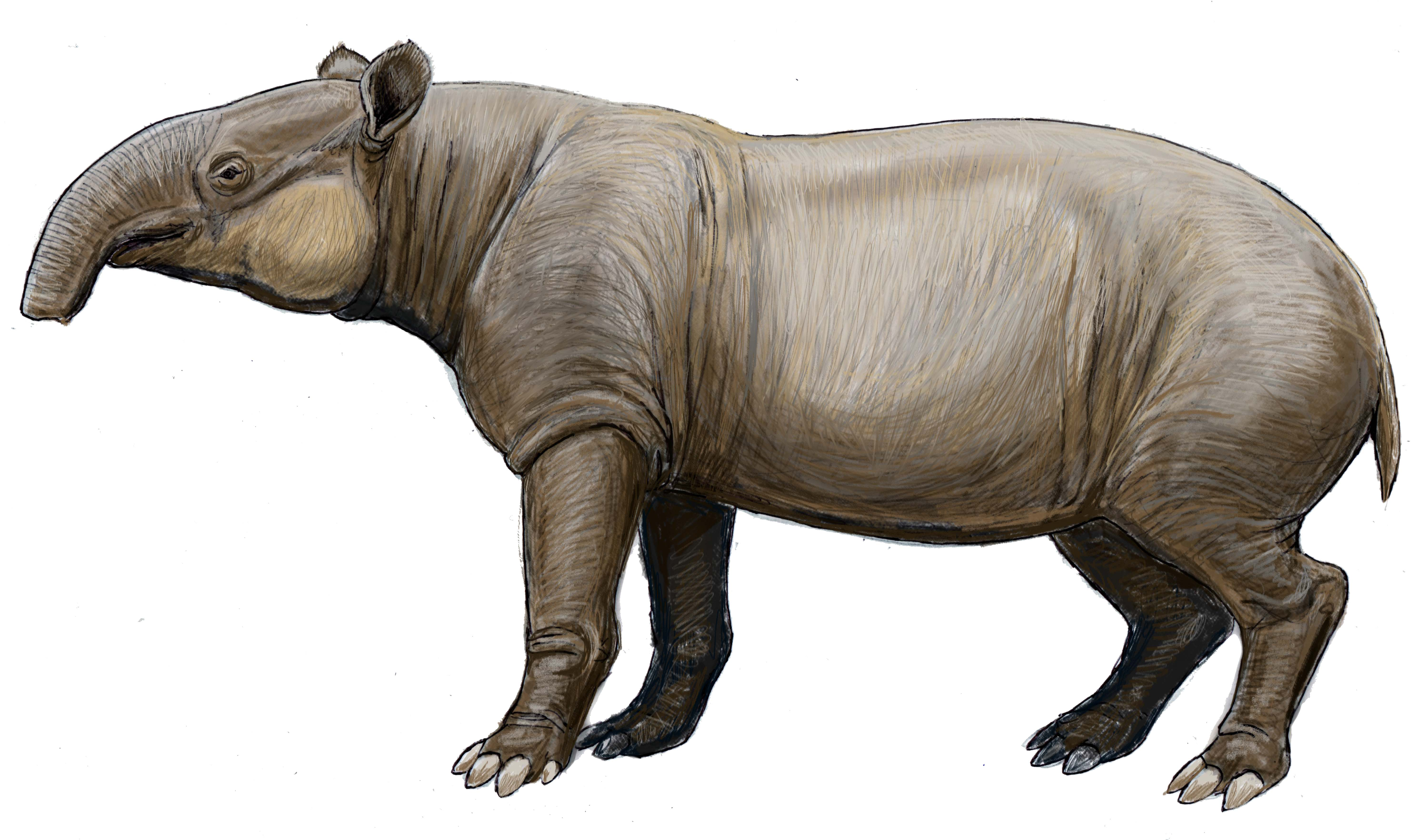
- A restoration of Tapirus augustus

Scientific classification
- Kingdom: Animalia
- Phylum: Chordata
- Class: Mammalia
- Order: Perissodactyla
- Family: Tapiridae
- Genus: Tapirus
- Species: †T. augustus

Binomial name
- †Tapirus augustus Matthew & Granger, 1923

Synonyms
- Megatapirus augustus (Matthew & Granger, 1923); Tapirus (Megatapirus) augustus Matthew & Granger, 1923

= Giant tapir =

Giant tapir Temporal range: Middle to Late Pleistocene

Extinct species of large Tapir

Tapirus augustus, also known as the giant tapir is an extinct species of large tapir that lived in East and Southeast Asia during the Pleistocene epoch. Remains have been reported from across southern China, as well as in Vietnam and Laos, spanning the Middle and Late Pleistocene. Evidence for a Holocene survival is considered questionable. Tapirus augustus is the largest known tapir, with an estimated weight of about 623 kilograms (1,373 lb). The species is often placed in its own genus Megatapirus, but its placement in a separate genus has been questioned.

== History of discovery, taxonomy and evolution ==
The paleontologist Max Schlosser of the Palaeontological Museum, Munich was the first to discover what would later be recognised to be remains of Tapirus augustus while purchasing teeth from Chinese drug stores in 1903 (fossils such as these were regarded as "dragon bones" and were collected to be used in traditional Chinese medicine) which he assigned to the species Tapirus sinensis. The species was first described in 1923 by William Diller Matthew and Walter Granger based on a skull, an upper jaw fragment of another skull, and two lower jaws found by the American Museum of Natural History during the museum's 1920s "Central Asiatic Expeditions" (which despite their name, took place almost entirely in China and Mongolia) in the fissure fill deposits of Yen-ching-kao (now romanised to Yanjinggou), near Wanzhou in what was then part of Sichuan but what is now part of Chongqing province in southwest China. They regarded it as being so distinctive as to tentatively warrant being placed in the new subgenus Megatapirus, (from Greek μέγας, megas, meaning 'big', 'tall' or 'great'). A number of authors have later considered Megatapirus to be a valid genus in its own right, but phylogenetic analyses suggest that the species is nested within the genus Tapirus, and as such other authors have continued to argue for Megatapirus to be treated a subgenus of Tapirus rather than as a separate genus.

The closest living relative of Tapirus augustus is suggested to be the Malayan tapir (Tapirus indicus), based on phylogenetic analysis. Tapirus augustus is suggested to be related to the earlier large tapir species Tapirus sinensis, known from the Early Pleistocene of China, and has been argued to have probably descended from this species. The earliest fossils attributed to the species date to the Middle Pleistocene, at least as early as 300–400,000 years ago.

== Description ==
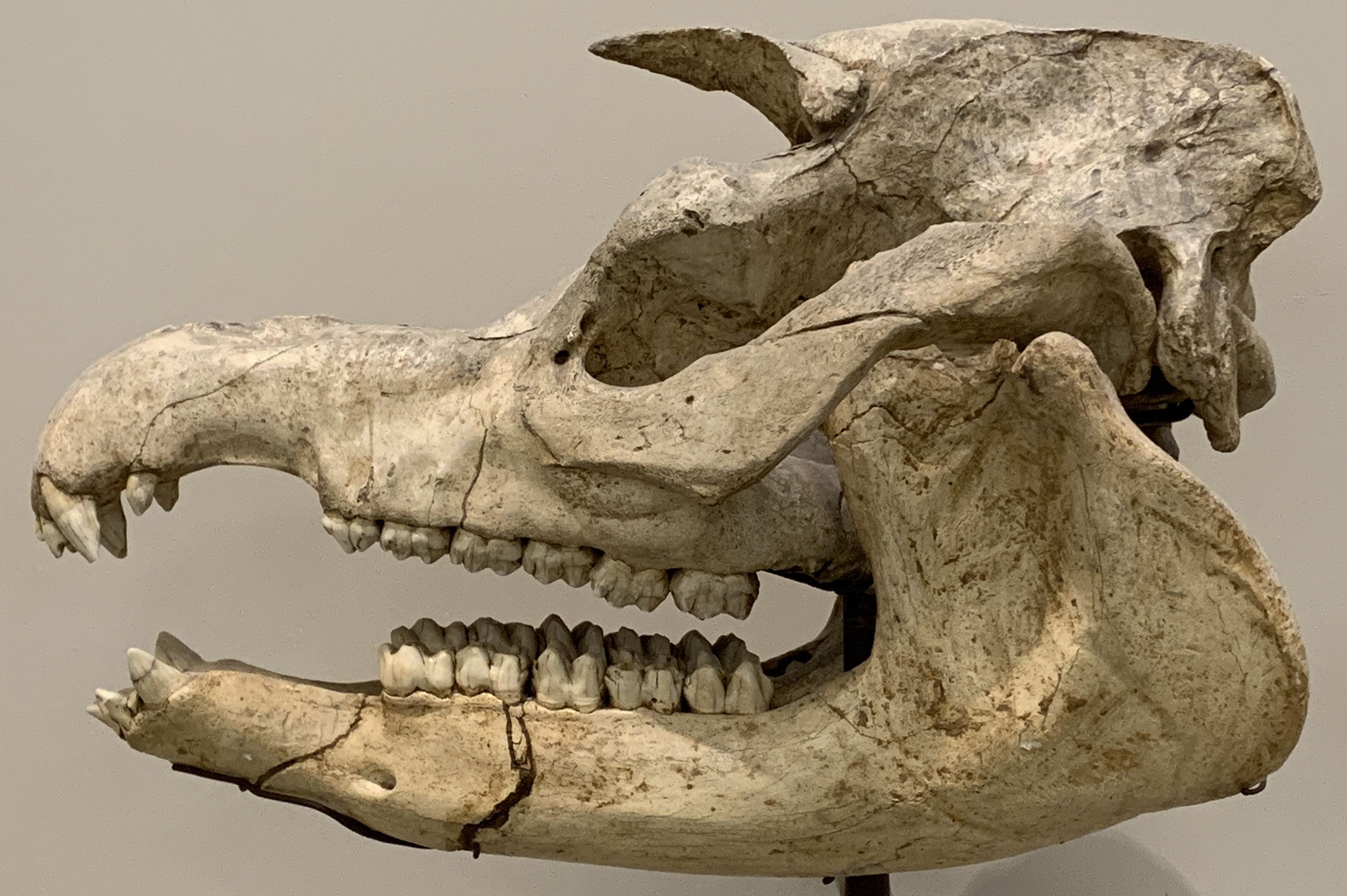
Restored holotype skull from Yanjinggou, China, on display at the American Museum of Natural History

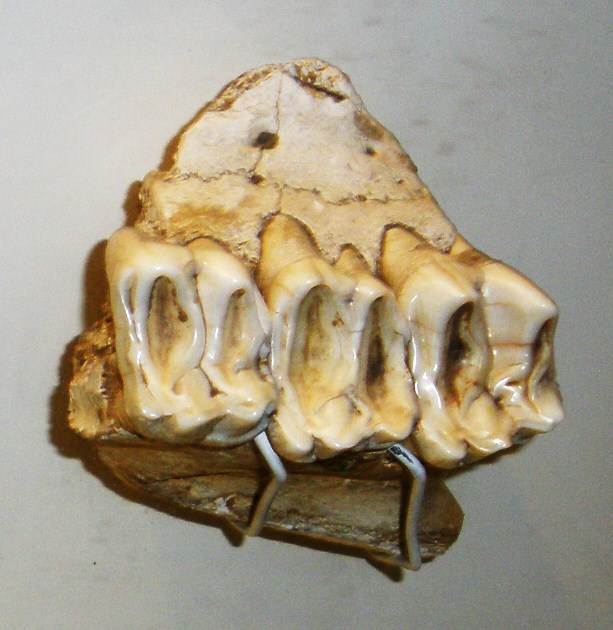
Teeth.

The skull of Tapirus augustus is large, on average 25% larger than those of living tapirs such as the Malayan tapir and the South American tapir (Tapirus terrestris), and proportionally is distinctly short and deep in comparison to other Tapirus species, with a high and thick vomer bone, noticeably moreso than in the Malayan or South American tapir. The top of the skull has a well developed high sagittal crest. The frontmost premolar teeth are more molar-like in their morphology than their counterparts in the Malayan tapir, and they have better developed inner cusps and cingulum, particularly on the upper first premolar (P^{1}). Tapirus augustus is the largest known species of Tapirus and of Tapiridae, with a 2018 study estimating a body mass of approximately 623 kilograms (1,373 lb). In comparison to the living Malayan tapir, its forelimb bones, in particular the humerus, are considerably less robust and more similar to those American Tapirus species.

== Distribution ==
Tapirus augustus is known from localities across Southern China, ranging as far north as Chongqing and Hubei, eastwards to Fujian, southwards to Guangdong and Guangxi, and westwards to Yunnan. It also occurred in southeast Asia, with records from Vietnam and Laos. Although historically suggested to be present in Taiwan, this suggestion is not supported by current research.

== Ecology ==
Tapirus augustus is considered like other tapirs to have probably been a browsing animal. It is thought to have lived in tropical rainforest environments, likely in close vicinity of water, such as marshland and river banks. Some authors have suggested that it fulfilled a similar ecological role to hippopotamuses, given the absence of hippotamuses in the region which Tapirus augustus inhabited. In southern China, Tapirus augustus formed part of the "Ailuropoda-Stegodon fauna" alongside animals both living in the region today as well as those that are extinct, including the giant panda ancestor Ailuropoda baconi, the Asian elephant (Elephas maximus) the extinct elephant-relative Stegodon orientalis, the Sumatran rhinoceros (Dicerorhinus sumatrensis), the extinct rhinoceros Rhinoceros sinensis (which may in reality actually represent the living Indian rhinoceros, Rhinoceros unicornis), wild boar (Sus scrofa), muntjac, water buffalo, sika deer (Cervus nippon), extinct species of orangutans (Pongo), gibbons (Hylobates), tigers (Panthera tigris), and the extinct cave hyena (Crocuta ultima).

== Relationship with humans ==
Remains of Tapirus augustus are frequently associated with stone tools and human remains in Late Pleistocene cave sites across the species range in southern China and Southeast Asia, which may suggest that they were consumed by people, but there is generally not direct evidence of hunting. Remains of Tapirus augustus alongside those of other animals found in Ma’anshan cave in Guizhou Province, southwest China, in two layers dating to around 55,000 and 31–19,000 years ago respectively, are suggested to have been brought into the cave and butchered by humans.

== Extinction ==
Although Tapirus augustus has been suggested to have survived into the Holocene, perhaps as recently as 5,600-4,200 years ago based on indirect associated radiocarbon dates on the bones of other animals and wood, the quality of these dates, like those of other southern Chinese Pleistocene megafauna have been considered questionable, and the youngest reliable dates for Tapirus augustus are considered to date to the Late Pleistocene. At Qingshuiyuan Dadong cave in Guizhou, remains of Tapirus augustus may date as recently as 13–11,000 years ago.
