= Box camera =

Cardboard or plastic box with a lens

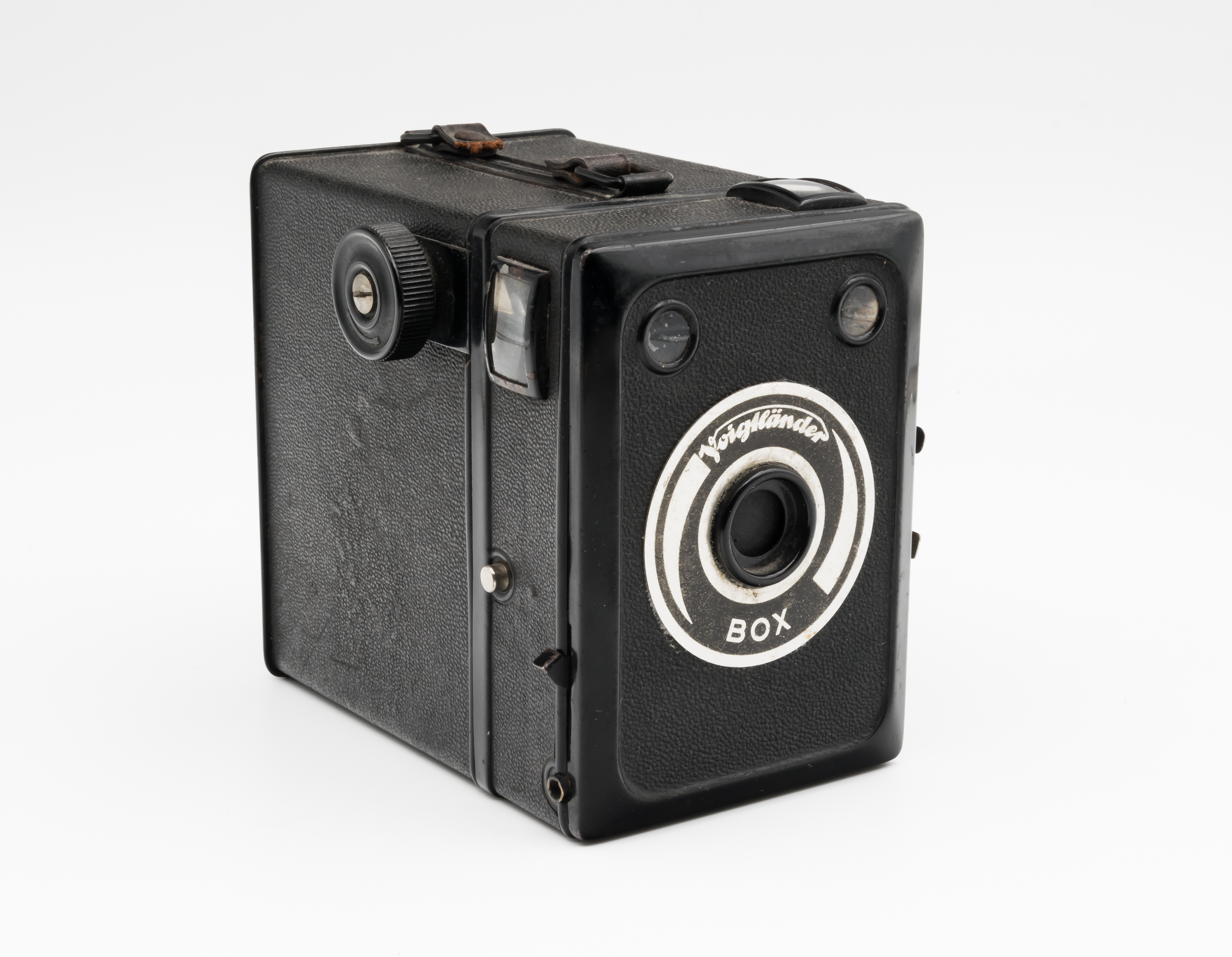
A classic box camera.

A box camera is a simple type of camera, the most common form being a cardboard or plastic box with a lens in one end and film at the other. They were sold in large numbers from the late 19th until the middle 20th centuries. The lenses are often single element designs meniscus fixed focus lens, or in better quality box cameras a doublet lens with minimal (if any) possible adjustments to the aperture or shutter speeds. Because of the inability to adjust focus, the small lens aperture and the low sensitivity of the sensitive materials available, these cameras work best in brightly lit day-lit scenes when the subject is within the hyperfocal distance for the lens and of subjects that move little during the exposure. Eventually, box cameras with photographic flash, shutter and aperture adjustment were introduced, allowing indoor photos.

== Purpose ==
The Kodak camera introduced in 1888 was the first box camera to become widely adopted by the public and its design became the archetype for box camera designs introduced by many different manufacturers. The use of flexible roll film meant that the cameras were light and portable and could be used without the encumbrance of tripods and the attendant difficulty of using glass photographic plates which were typical of professional cameras. Before the introduction of the Kodak, photographers were responsible for making their own arrangements for the development and printing of their pictures. The first Kodak came pre-loaded with film and the customer returned the camera to Kodak for processing and to be reloaded with film for the customer. In 1900, a Yale plate box camera cost US$2 (about $77.00 in 2025 dollars). and a Kodak rollfilm box sold for US$1 (about $39.00 in 2025 dollars)

== Typical box cameras ==
- Kodak introduced in May 1888 the first commercially successful box camera for roll film with 100 exposures — the advertising slogan being You press the button – we do the rest.
- The Kodak Brownie, a long lasting series of classical box cameras using roll film.
- The Ansco Panda was designed to compete directly with the Brownies. It used 620 film.
- The Kodak Instamatic using 126 film, later 110 film.
- The modern disposable camera using 135 film.
- The Zeiss Ikon Box-Tengor for roll film.

== Other box cameras ==
Although many cameras of the mid nineteenth century were wooden and "boxy" in appearance with a brass fitted lens on the front they should not be confused with the mass-produced box cameras that exploded in popularity after the introduction of the first Kodak.

=== Le Phoebus 1870 ===
The "Le Phoebus" camera was typical, it was built of mahogany wood with a brass mounted lens in a rack-and-pinion focuser to adjust the projected image sharply onto a ground glass at the back. Most cameras like this used glass plates. The lens did not come equipped with a shutter; instead, the lenscap was removed and replaced to control the exposure time.

=== Pocket Kodak 1895–1896 ===
Pocket Kodaks were small (2 3/16 by 3 by 4 inches; 56 mm × 76 mm × 102 mm) and lightweight (6 ounces; 170 g), and took roughly 2-inch (51 mm) exposures on 102 size rollfilm. This camera had a new feature, a small view box that told how many exposures of film were left. They were first available in 1895 with either black or red leather covering.

=== Crown Camera 1896 ===
Patent GB189602965 was granted on February 10, 1896, to Thomas Peter Bethell of Crown Works, Boundary Place, Liverpool for a "simple construction of camera to be made of cardboard of metal, or a combination of both". The Crown Camera had a quarter-plate cardboard-body with two waist level finders, cardboard rubber-band powered shutter, four-position rotary stops marked 1 2 3 4, a single meniscus lens, removable ground glass screen, rear sliding sheath and leather carrying strap.

=== le Papillon 1905–1908 ===
Meaning "the butterfly," le Papillon was a small French stereo camera which made 45 mm × 107 mm (1 3/4 in × 4 3/16 in) stereoscopic images on glass plates in single plateholders.

=== No. 00 Cartridge Premo Camera, 1916–1922 ===
The No. 00 Cartridge Premo was Kodak's smallest box camera ever. It was only 2 1/2 inches (64 mm) tall. It uses a simple rotary shutter with meniscus lens, and does not have a viewfinder. The photographer must use the leatherette covering to attempt to see the subject of the photograph.

== See also ==
- List of camera types
- Diana Mini Camera
