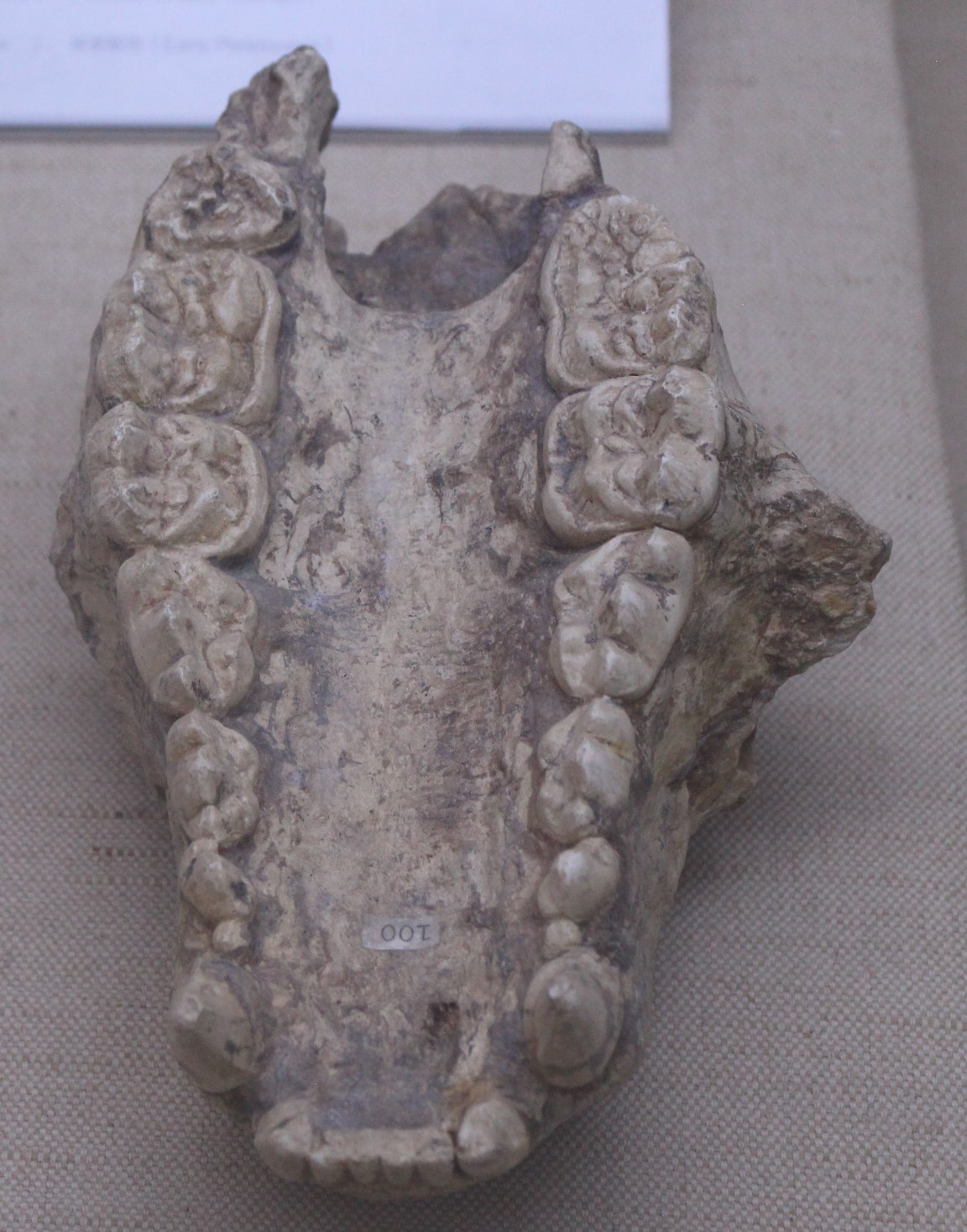
- Skull (IVPP V4715), Paleozoological Museum of China

Scientific classification
- Kingdom: Animalia
- Phylum: Chordata
- Class: Mammalia
- Infraclass: Placentalia
- Order: Carnivora
- Family: Ursidae
- Genus: Ailuropoda
- Species: †A. baconi

Binomial name
- †Ailuropoda baconi (Woodward, 1915)

= Ailuropoda baconi =

Ailuropoda baconi Temporal range: Late Pleistocene

Extinct species of bear

Ailuropoda baconi is an extinct species or subspecies of bear known from cave deposits in South China, Laos, Vietnam, Myanmar, and Thailand spanning the Middle and Late Pleistocene and into the Middle Holocene. It is the direct ancestor of the living giant panda (A. melanoleuca). It was preceded by A. wulingshanensis. Its distinctiveness from the living giant panda is disputed, and it has been argued that it should be treated as a paleosubspecies of the giant panda as A. melanoleuca baconi.

== Description ==
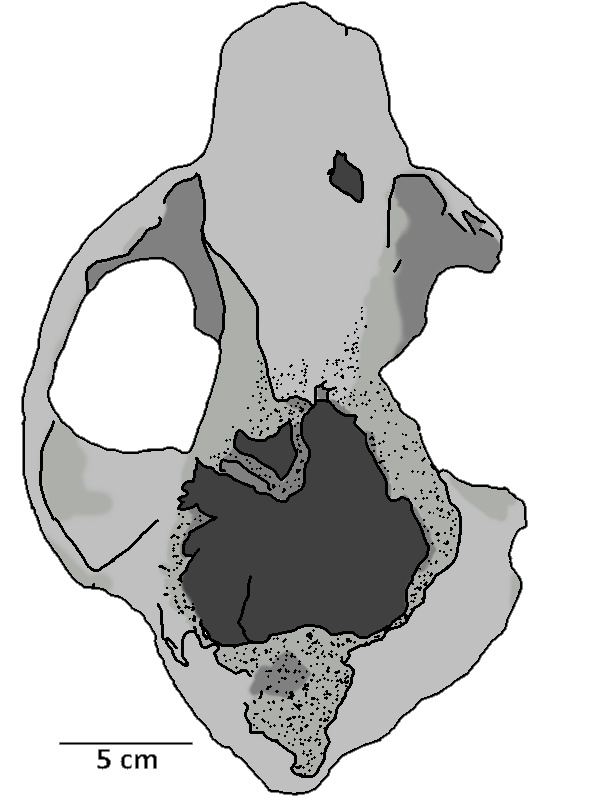
Skull

Members of A. (melanoleuca) baconi were the largest members of the giant panda lineage, considerably larger than the preceding species A. wulingshanensis, and somewhat larger than the living giant panda. The average body mass of A. (m.) baconi some localities was estimated in a 2024 study at approximately 120–130 kilograms (260–290 lb), with some individuals estimated to exceed 140 kilograms (310 lb), compared to the around 120 kilograms (260 lb) and 100 kilograms (220 lb) average weight estimated for captive mature male and female giant pandas, respectively. The zygomatic arches of the skull are very well developed, though the sagittal crest at the top of the skull is only moderately developed.

== Palaeoecology ==
Unlike the living giant panda, which is confined to mountainous areas higher than 1,000 metres (3,300 ft) above sea level, A. (m.) baconi ranged widely across southern China and into southeast Asia, from altitudes below 200 metres (660 ft) to above 2,000 metres (6,600 ft). δ^{13}C values derived from A. baconi specimens indicate that it had a preference for open forest habitat. Its diet was probably broader than that of the primarily bamboo consuming giant panda, though it was still predominantly plant based. Ailuropoda baconi was a titular member of the "Ailuropoda-Stegodon fauna" in southern China in the Middle-Late Pleistocene, alongside species such as the giant tapir Tapirus augustus,the Asian elephant (Elephas maximus) the extinct elephant-relative Stegodon orientalis, the Sumatran rhinoceros (Dicerorhinus sumatrensis), the extinct rhinoceros Rhinoceros sinensis (which may in reality actually represent the living Indian rhinoceros, Rhinoceros unicornis), wild boar (Sus scrofa), muntjac, water buffalo, sika deer (Cervus nippon), the extinct orangutan species Pongo weidenreichi, gibbons (Hylobates), tigers (Panthera tigris), and the extinct cave hyena (Crocuta ultima).

== Extinction ==
Ailuropoda baconi saw a dramatic range collapse from the end of the Pleistocene to the middle Holocene, becoming restricted to upland areas above 1,000 metres (3,300 ft), where it evolved into the modern giant panda. The morphological transition between A. baconi and the living giant panda may be due to ecological changes as a result of the restriction to mountainous environments.
