= Diana Mini Camera =

Box camera

Overview
- Maker: Lomographische AG,
- Type: Box camera

Lens
- Lens: 24mm (Square Format: 30mm equivalent, Half Frame format: 35mm equivalent)
- F-numbers: f/8, f/11

Sensor/medium
- Sensor type: Film
- Sensor size: 24mm × 24mm OR 24mm × 17mm
- Recording medium: 35mm film

Focusing
- Focus: 0.6m-inf.

Shutter
- Shutter speeds: 1/60, Bulb

The Diana Mini Camera is a plastic box camera that utilizes 35mm film, and is a part of a long line of toy cameras known for taking photos vibrant in color with deep saturation and vignettes shot through a plastic lens. It is capable of taking 72 exposures per roll of film in "half-frame" mode and 36 exposures in "square" mode. It can also take multiple exposures. Modeled after the original Diana camera, the Diana Mini is one of many reproductions and re-imaginings of the Diana camera by the Austria-based company, Lomographische AG FN: FN 134784. The Diana Mini is one of several new production versions of the Diana camera currently available as the Diana+ series, produced by Lomography.

Diana Mini Camera with flash, hot shoe adapter and converter, lens cap, and color gels

== History ==
The Diana Mini came about after the reincarnation of the original Diana camera, the Diana F+ Camera, released in 2007. The Diana Mini brought with it the ability of the photographer to choose between the half-frame format that allows the user to shoot twice the amount of exposures for any 35mm film roll, or the less common square format that allows for 24x24mm exposures to be shot on 35mm film.

Photo taken with Diana Mini camera

== See also ==
- Diana camera
- Holga camera
- Impressionism
- Lomography
- Pictorialism
- Soft focus
