= Panda (surname) =

Panda is an Indian Odia surname that may refer to the following notable people:

- Antonija Panda (born 1977), Serbian canoeist
- Baijayant Panda, Indian politician
- Bibhudutta Panda (born 1989), Indian cricketer
- Brahmananda Panda (1949–2010), Indian politician
- Braja Mohan Panda (1890–1965), Indian educator and poet
- Dulal Panda (born 1964), Indian cell biologist
- Gayatribala Panda (born 1977), Indian poet, fiction writer and journalist
- Gopal Chandra Panda (born 1940), Odissi musician
- Nila Madhab Panda (born 1973), Indian film producer and director
- Prabodh Panda (1946–2018), Indian politician
- Rajendra Kishore Panda (1944–2025), Indian poet and novelist
- Rama Chandra Panda (born 1949), Indian politician
- Ruchira Panda (born 1975), Indian vocalist
- Rutaparna Panda (born 1999), Indian badminton player
- Sanju Panda (born 1959), Indian judge
- Satchidananda Panda (born 1971), Indian-American chronobiologist
- Sriram Panda (born 1954), Indian actor, director and writer
- Subrat Kumar Panda (born 1954), Indian virologist
- Sumit Panda (born 1979), Indian cricketer
- Swetaparna Panda (born 2005), Indian badminton player, sister of Rutaparna
