= Li Xun =

Li Xun may refer to:

- Li Xun (Western Liang) (died 421), final ruler of Western Liang
- Li Xun (Tang dynasty) (died 784), Tang dynasty prince
- Li Zhongyan (died 835), Tang dynasty politician, known as Li Xun in 835
- Li Xun (footballer) (born 1992)
