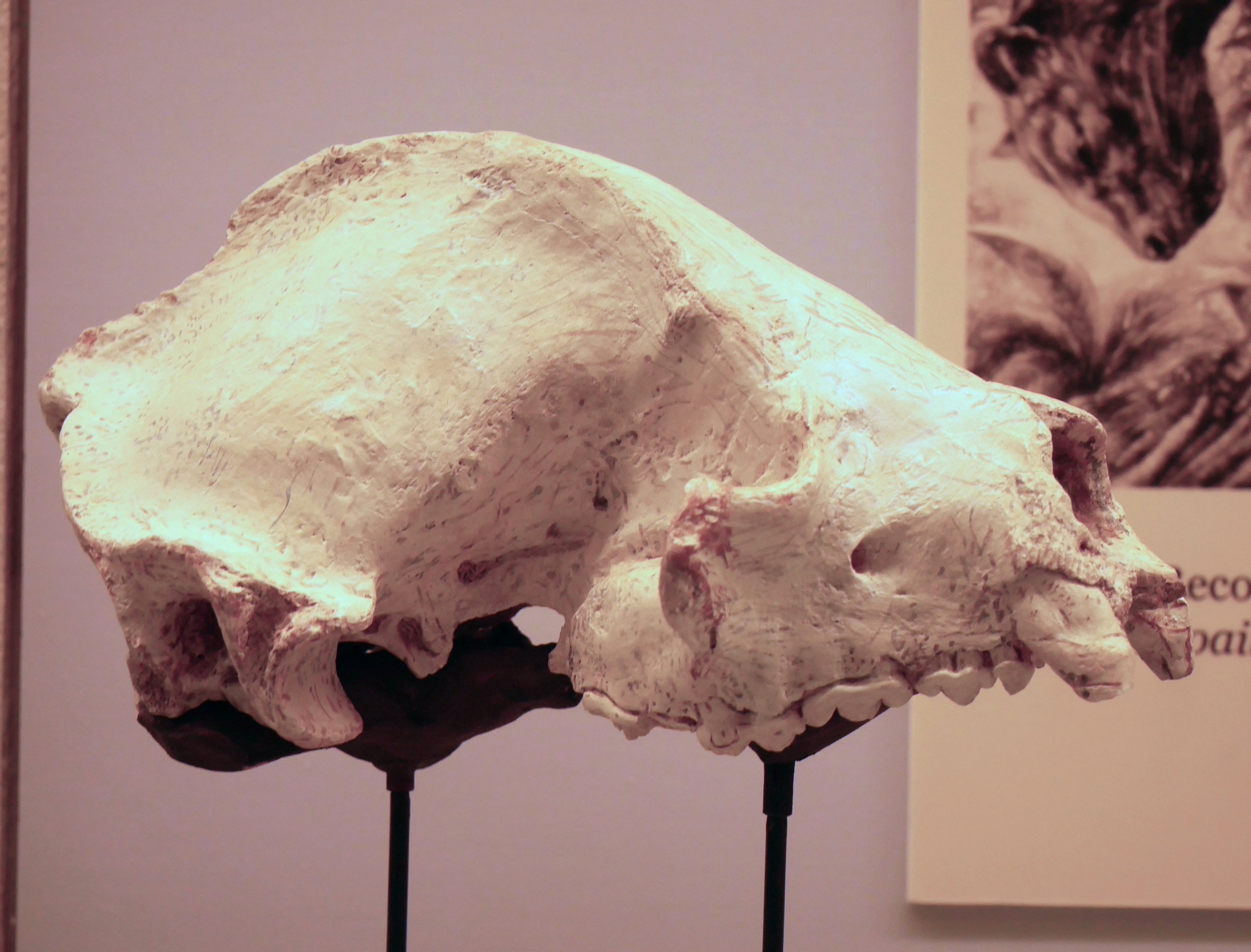

Scientific classification
- Kingdom: Animalia
- Phylum: Chordata
- Class: Mammalia
- Order: Carnivora
- Family: Ursidae
- Genus: Ailuropoda
- Species: †A. microta

Binomial name
- †Ailuropoda microta Pei, 1962

= Ailuropoda microta =

Ailuropoda microta Temporal range: Early Pleistocene

Extinct species of bear

Ailuropoda microta is the earliest known member of the genus Ailuropoda, which includes the living giant panda (Ailuropoda melanoleuca). It is the smallest and most primitive member of the genus, with an estimated body mass of around 70 kilograms (150 lb). It measured 1 m (3 ft) in length; the modern giant panda grows to a size in excess of 1.5 m (5 ft). The discovery of a nearly complete skull of A. microta in Guangxi, China, revealed cranial and dental features intermediate between earlier panda ancestors such as Ailuractos and the living giant panda. The shape of its cheek teeth indicates that like the living giant panda they were adapted for herbivory, but the cheek tooth morphology is relatively simple in comparison to the progressively increasingly complex cheek tooth morphology of later Ailuropoda species, including its direct successor Ailuropoda wulingshanensis. A herbivorous diet for A. microta has been confirmed by isotopic analysis. Wear patterns on its teeth has let to suggestions that it lived on a diet of bamboo, the primary food of the giant panda. However, due its small size, less complex cheek teeth and less powerful jaw muscles (due to the less verticalized occiput region of the skull than the giant panda) has led to suggestions that it may have only consumed leaves, shoots and fruits of bamboo, rather than the highly fibrous stems like living giant panda.

A. microta lived during the Early Pleistocene in southern China, around 2.5-1.8 million years ago. Other animals that lived alongside Ailuropoda microta include the giant ape Gigantopithecus blacki, the chalicothere (ungulates with gorilla-like forelimbs) Hesperotherium, the elephant relatives Sinomastodon jiangnanensis and Stegodon huananensis, the tapir Tapirus sanyuanensis, the swines Sus peii and Sus xiaozhu, the deer Cervavitus fenqii , the chevrotain Dorcabune, and the bovid Megalovis guangxiensis.
