= Ansco Panda =

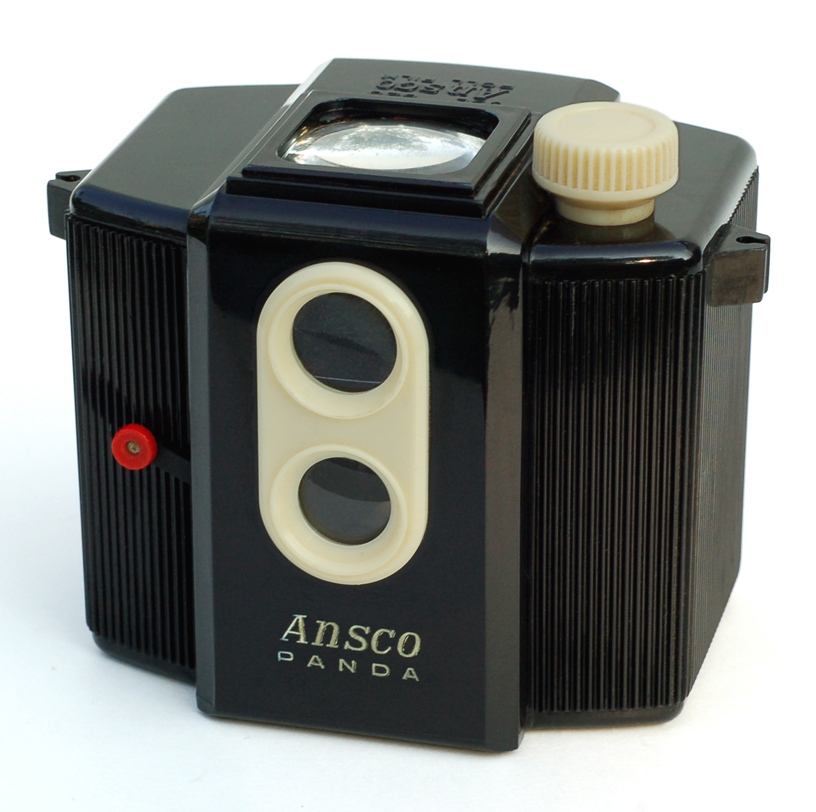
An Ansco panda camera.

The Ansco Panda was a simple child's box camera made by the Ansco camera corporation of Binghamton, New York in the 1940s. Its appearance is quite similar to the Kodak Baby Brownie and was designed to compete directly with it. The camera features a black plastic body with cream accents around the lenses, a cream colored wind knob and a TLR style viewing lens above the taking lens. Images are composed via a waist level viewfinder and taken by means of a traditional Ansco red shutter trigger button depressed by the right index finger. The camera produces 12 square photographs on a single roll of 620 format film (Ansco No. 20 film). Focal length of the camera is 60 mm and it has an f/16 lens. Focus is fixed and objects from about 6' to infinity are in focus.
