= Song Yuren =

Early-period positive-reformist philosopher of China

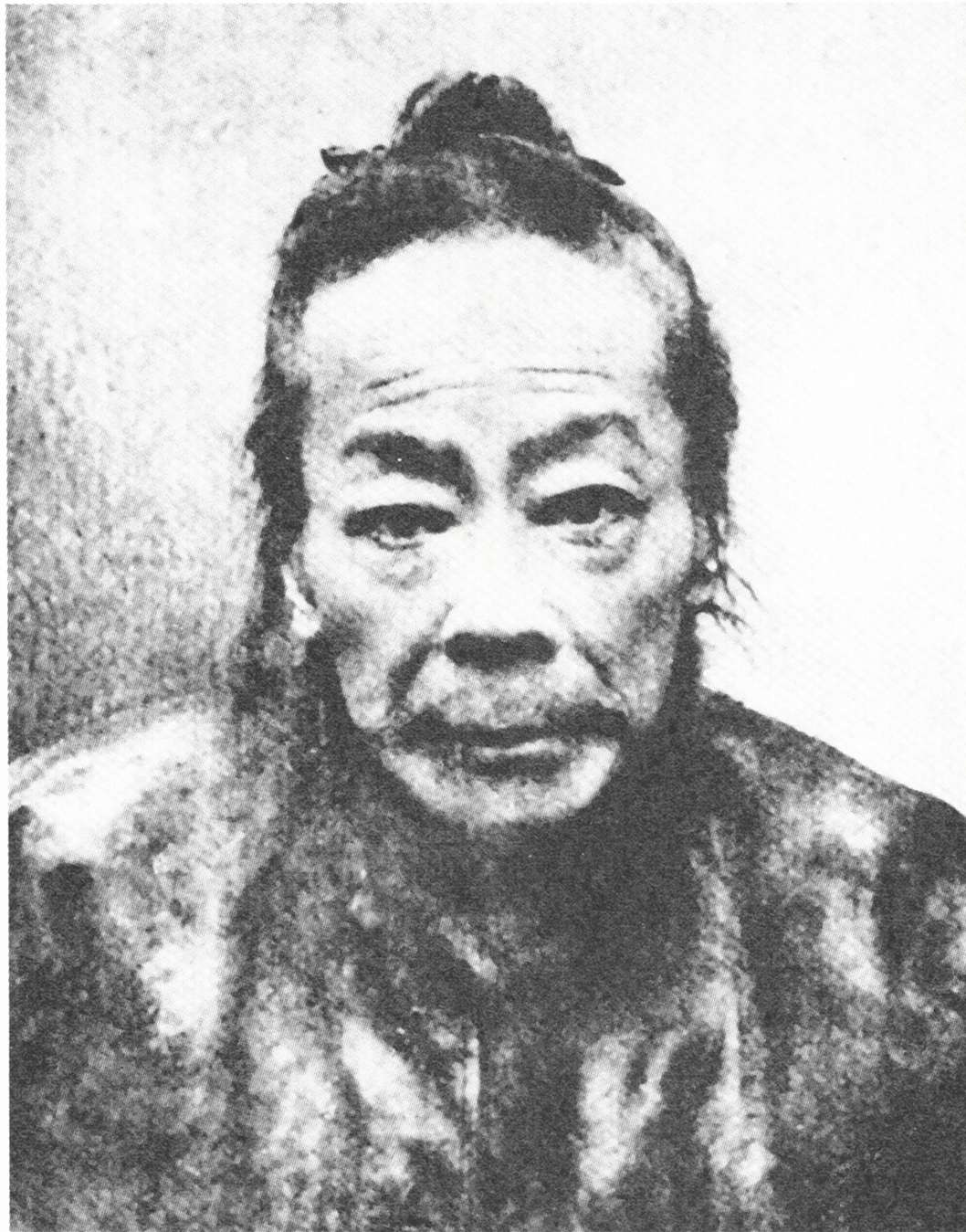

Song Yuren (Chinese: 宋育仁; 1857-1931), word name Ziyun and Daofu, from Fushun, Sichuan, was a Qing Dynasty Jinshi and early period positive reformist philosopher of China.

== Experience ==
In Guangxu 12th year (1886), he became Jinshi of the Dynasty court, then he was granted Shujishi and Jiantao of Hanlin Academy. In Guangxu 13th year (1887), he finished his literature current affairs theory for learning western countries and reform of monarch system. About seven years later, he was appointed as diplomatic officer to the British. In the period, he connected with western scholars and officials to exchange opinions, such as Max Muller, between western and eastern culture. He discussed with Japanese politician Mochizuki Kotaro (望月小太郎) about consistent standard pronunciation of Chinese characters in historical evolving.

During the Sino-Japanese War, he urged to form a marine fleet of Australia, sailing from the Philippines to Japan´s main island and Nagasaki to destroy the defense force of Japan. However, the Dynasty court stopped the plan and instructed him back from overseas.

In 1896, he began to hold business and mineral activities in Sichuan and Chongqing. He died in 1931 in Chengdu, Sichuan.
