= Pandan =

Pandan may refer to:

== Plants ==
- Pandanus, a genus of tropical trees, the screw-pines
  - Pandanus amaryllifolius, a tropical plant used in Southeast Asian cuisine

== Places ==
=== Brunei ===
- Kampong Pandan, Brunei

=== Malaysia ===
- Pandan-Tebrau, a location in Johor, Malaysia
- Pandan (federal constituency), represented in the Dewan Rakyat

=== Philippines ===
- Pandan, Antique, a municipality in the Philippines
- Pandan, Catanduanes, a municipality in the Philippines
- Pandan, Angeles, a barangay in Angeles, Philippines
- Pandan Islands, two islands part of Sablayan, Occidental Mindoro, Philippines
- Pandan Niog, a barangay in Pangutaran, Sulu, Philippines
- Pandan, a barangay in Real, Quezon, Philippines
- Pandan, a barangay in Caoayan, Ilocos Sur, Philippines
- Pandan, a barangay in Cabusao, Camarines Sur, Philippines

=== Singapore ===
- Pandan Gardens, a housing estate in Jurong East, Singapore
- Pandan Reservoir, a reservoir in Singapore
- Selat Pandan, a strait south of Singapore's main island
- Pandan, a subzone of Clementi planning area

== Other uses ==
- Paan dan, a type of container for storing paan (betel leaf)
- Pandan cake, a type of dessert popular in Southeast Asia
