= Russell Ciochon =

Russell L. Ciochon (born March 11, 1948) is an American paleoanthropologist. He was born in Altadena, California and received three degrees (B.A. in 1971; M.A. in 1974; and PhD. in 1986) in anthropology from the University of California, Berkeley. He is a professor emeritus of anthropology at the University of Iowa. He is known primarily for his research into Gigantopithecus.

== Awards and honors ==
- 1971 – Phi Beta Kappa
- 1972–1976 – U.S. National Institutes of Health (NIGMS) Predoctoral Fellowship
- 1986 – American Men and Women of Science
- 1990–1993 – University of Iowa Faculty Scholar Award
- 1992 – Who's Who in Science and Engineering
- 1995 – Who's Who in the World
- 1999 – International Authors and Writers Who's Who
- 2001 – Fellow National, The Explorer's Club, New York

== Television appearances ==
He has appeared in the documentaries: Sasquatch: Legend Meets Science on the Discovery Channel, and most recently on Giganto: The Real King Kong which aired on the History Channel. Both of those shows dealt with Gigantopithecus, one of Ciochon's specialties.
