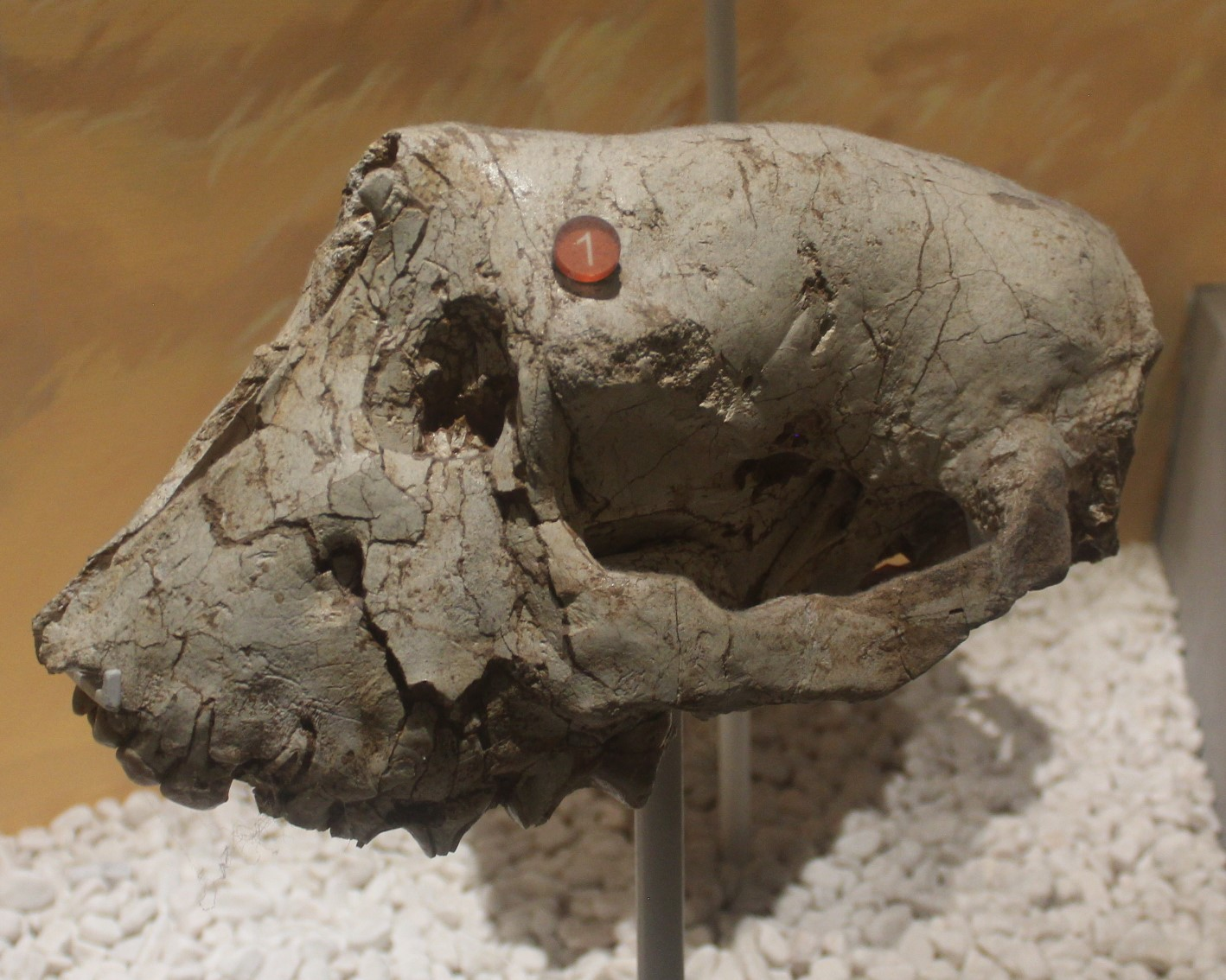
- Skull of N. linxiaense, National Natural History Museum of China

Scientific classification
- Kingdom: Animalia
- Phylum: Chordata
- Class: Mammalia
- Order: Perissodactyla
- Family: †Chalicotheriidae
- Subfamily: †Chalicotheriinae
- Genus: †Nestoritherium; Kaup, 1859

Type species
- †Nestoritherium sivalense (Falconer & Cautley, 1837)

Species
- †N. fuguense; †N. linxiaense; †N. sivalense; †N. wuduense

= Nestoritherium =

Nestoritherium Temporal range: 11.6–0.781 Ma Late Miocene to Early Pleistocene

Extinct genus of chalicothere

Nestoritherium is an extinct genus of chalicothere; it has been dated to have lived from the late Miocene to the Early Pleistocene (11.6–0.781 mya). This range makes Nestoritherium, along with the related Hesperotherium, one of the most recently dated chalicotheres. It has been found in fossil sites in India(Pinjor Formation), Indonesia, Myanmar and China.

The genus Nestoritherium was erected by German paleontologist Johann Jakob Kaup in 1859 for the species then known as Chalicotherium sivalense, itself named in 1843 by Falconer and Cautley from early Pleistocene material from India, that were collected from the region west of Yamuna alongside Giraffa sivalensis, Sivatherium, Camelus sivalensis, and numerous others. Later in 1868, a nearly complete anterior portion of the skull from the Dadoopoor collection of Messrs, Baker and Durand(most likely collected from the hills between Markanda pass and Pinjor, which is where most of the Dadupur collection specimens come from), was referred to Nestoritherium sivalense. Robert Hardwicke, London The shortened faced and brachyodont dentition suggests it belongs to the subfamily Chalicotheriinae.

Nestoritherium fuguense was named from partial lower jaw and palate material from Miocene beds in Fugu County, China in 2014.

Material consisting of a fragmentary upper and lower molar recovered from the (early Pleistocene) Irrawaddy Formation in Myanmar has been referred to the genus Nestoritherium. A femur of possible chalicothere origin was recovered from Pliocene deposits in Yenangyaung in 1897.
