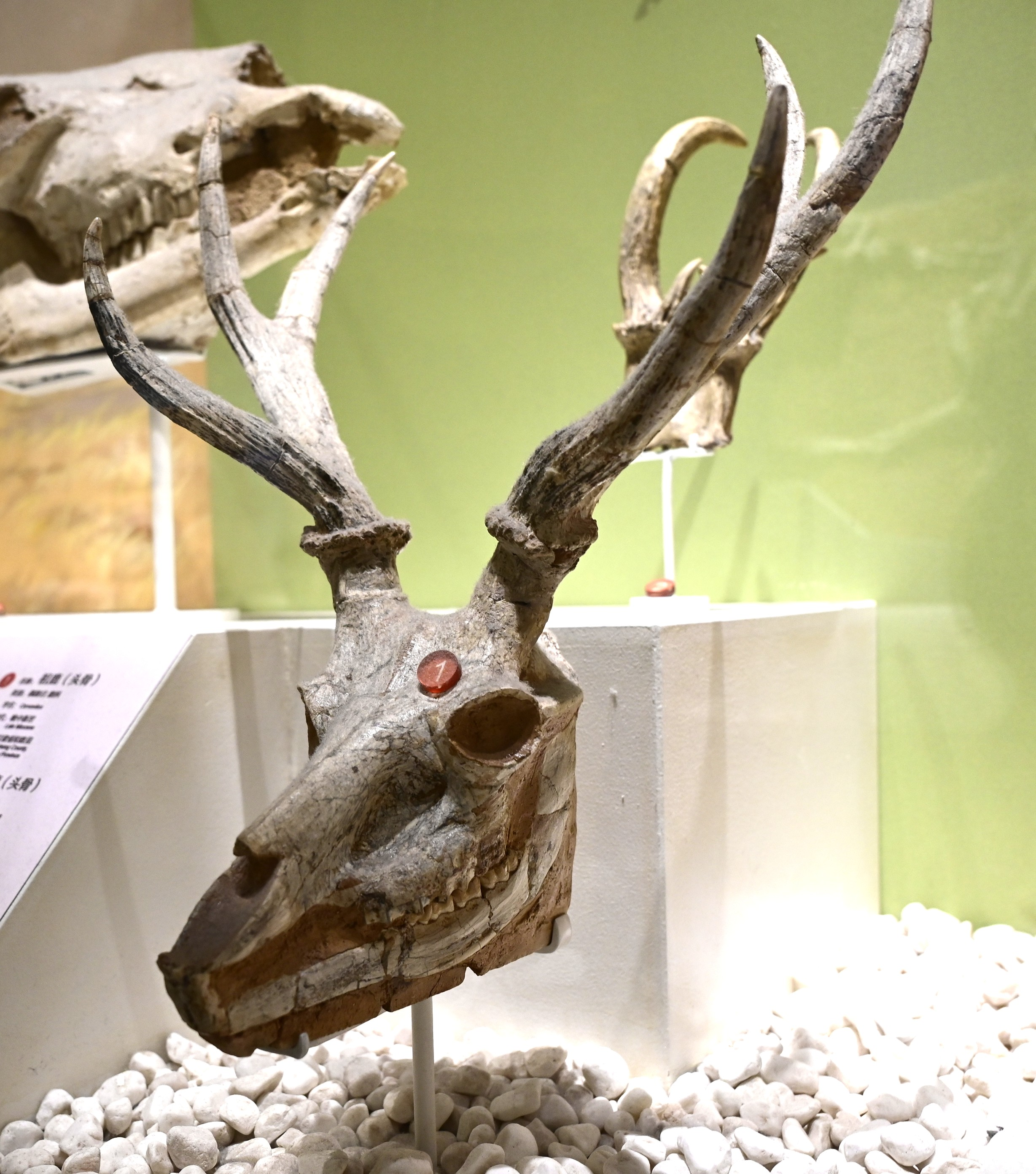
- Fossil skull, National Natural History Museum of China

Scientific classification
- Kingdom: Animalia
- Phylum: Chordata
- Class: Mammalia
- Infraclass: Placentalia
- Order: Artiodactyla
- Family: Cervidae
- Genus: †Cervavitus; Chomenko, 1913

Species
- Cervavitus cauvieri; Cervavitus fenqii; Cervavitus flerovi; Cervavitus huadeensis; Cervavitus novorossiae; Cervavitus shanxius; Cervavitus ultimus; Cervavitus variabilis

Synonyms
- Cervoceros Khomenko 1913; Cervocerus Khomenko 1913; Damacerus Khomenko 1913; Metadicrocerus Schlosser 1924; Procervus Alexejev 1913

= Cervavitus =

Cervavitus Temporal range: 9–0.9 Ma Miocene to Early Pleistocene

Genus of mammals (fossil)

Cervavitus is a genus of prehistoric deer that lived from the late Miocene (Vallesian age) to the Early Pleistocene (Villafranchian age) in parts of Western and Eastern Europe, Central Asia and China.

== Description ==
It is characterized by having thorny antlers finished in two or three points, brachyodont teeth, molars with a primitive fold (known as the "Palaeomeryx fold") and complete lateral metacarpals on their feet, which would serve to move through slope areas.

== Taxonomy ==
Due to its particular position in the systematics and phylogeny of deer, is considered to form part of the first branches of cervids more advanced than the muntiacines, and perhaps is closely related to the branch that would give rise to the modern genus Cervus, although it has traditionally been classified as part of a separate subfamily called Pliocervinae.

== Evolution ==
Cervavitus probably evolved in forested areas of Eastern Europe and then disperse during the Miocene to Western Europe and East Asia, taking advantage of the moist forests of Eurasia at the time, but the progressive aridity of parts of Asia and Europe since the Pliocene and the beginning of the Pleistocene, as a result of changes like the elevation of the Himalayas, forced these deer to take refuge in southern China, where they evolved into or were replaced by the modern deer genera Rusa and Axis.
