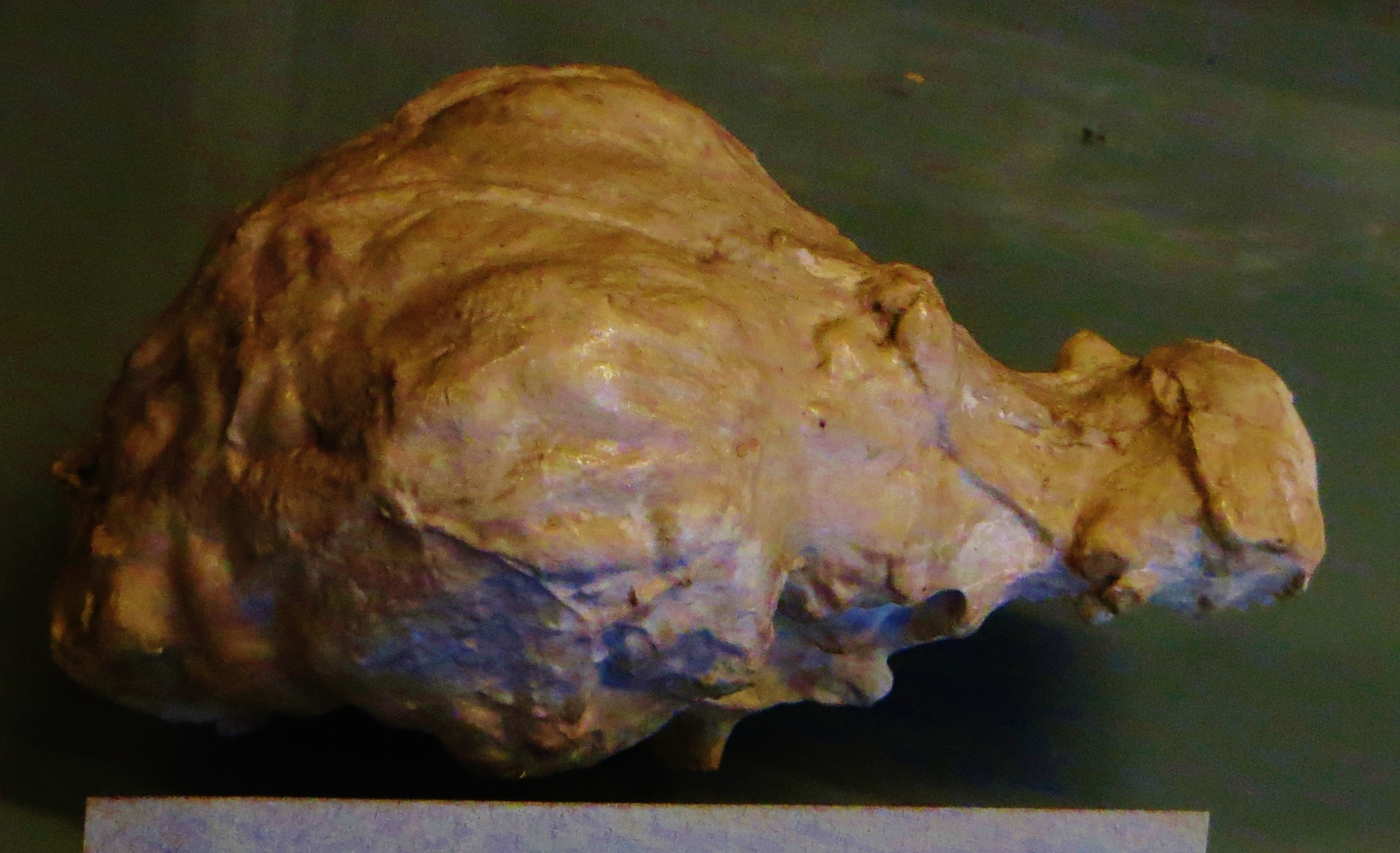
- Endocranial fossil of Megalovis latifrons

Scientific classification
- Domain: Eukaryota
- Kingdom: Animalia
- Phylum: Chordata
- Class: Mammalia
- Order: Artiodactyla
- Family: Bovidae
- Subfamily: Caprinae
- Tribe: Ovibovini
- Genus: †Megalovis; Schaub, 1923

Type species
- †Megalovis latifrons Schaub, 1923

Species
- M. balcanicus; M. guangxiensis; M. latifrons; M. piveteaui?; M. wimani?

= Megalovis =

Megalovis Temporal range: Late Pliocene - Lower Pleistocene 3–1 Ma

Extinct genus of mammal

Megalovis is an extinct genus of bovid that lived in Eurasia during the Plio-Pleistocene.

== Taxonomy ==
Megalovis is typically considered a member of the subtribe Ovibovina of the Caprini tribe within the Antilopinae subfamily, which includes the living musk-ox. However, certain cranial characteristics like the teeth and horns are more similar to goats in the subtribe Caprina. Three to five species are recognized including M. latifrons, the (type species) from Central and Southern Europe, the recently discovered M. balcanicus from the Balkans and M. guangxiensis from China. Megalovis survived until the end of Villafranchian, approximately 1 million years ago.

== Description ==
Megalovis was a large animal, resembling a musk-ox in general morphology and weighing around half a ton.

However, its skull and horns more resembled that of a typical goat or sheep. It horns were short, with a circular section at the base. The horns curved upwards and slightly back. Its dentition was hypsodont, indicating it was a grazer.
