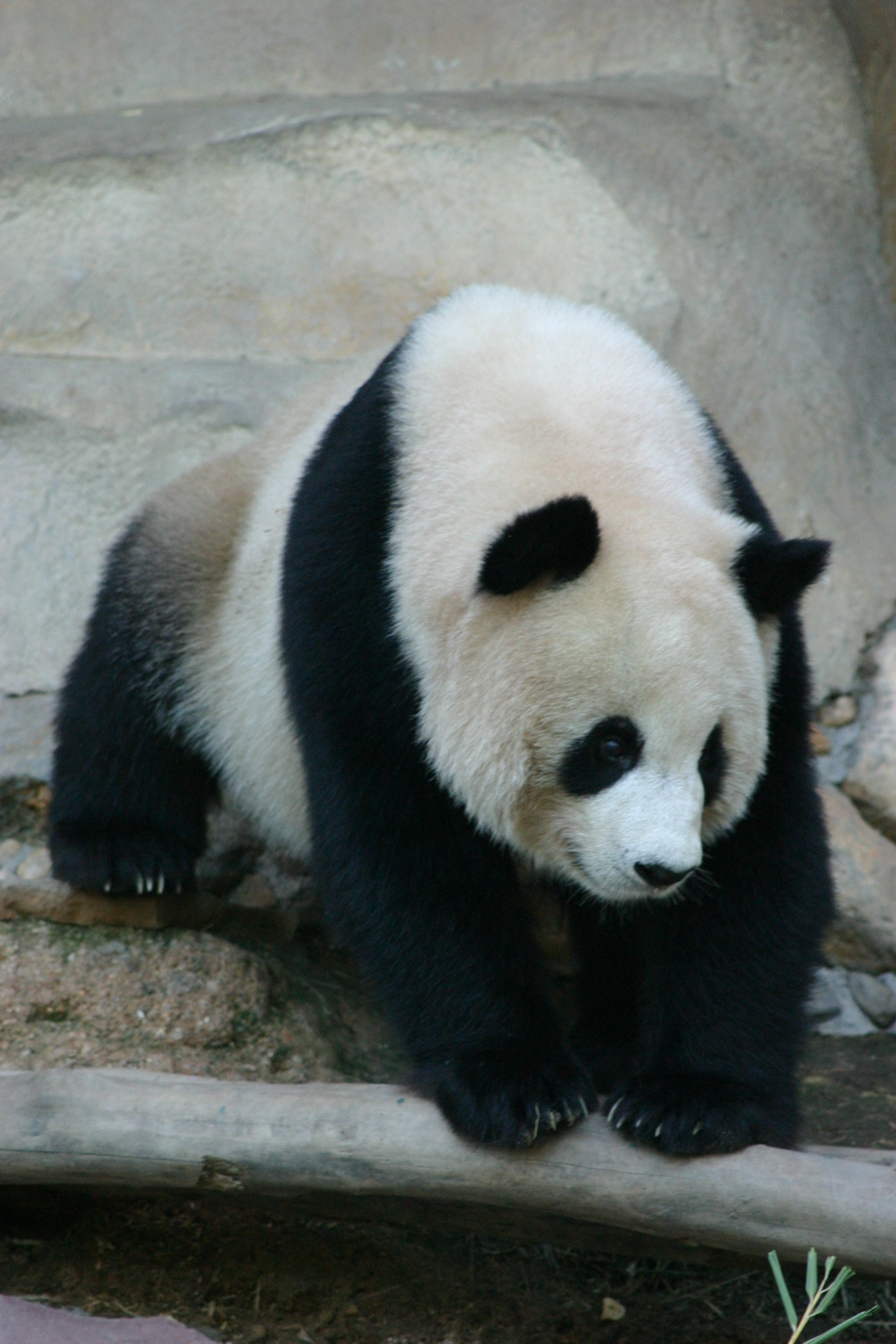
- The giant panda, the only extant species in the genus and subfamily
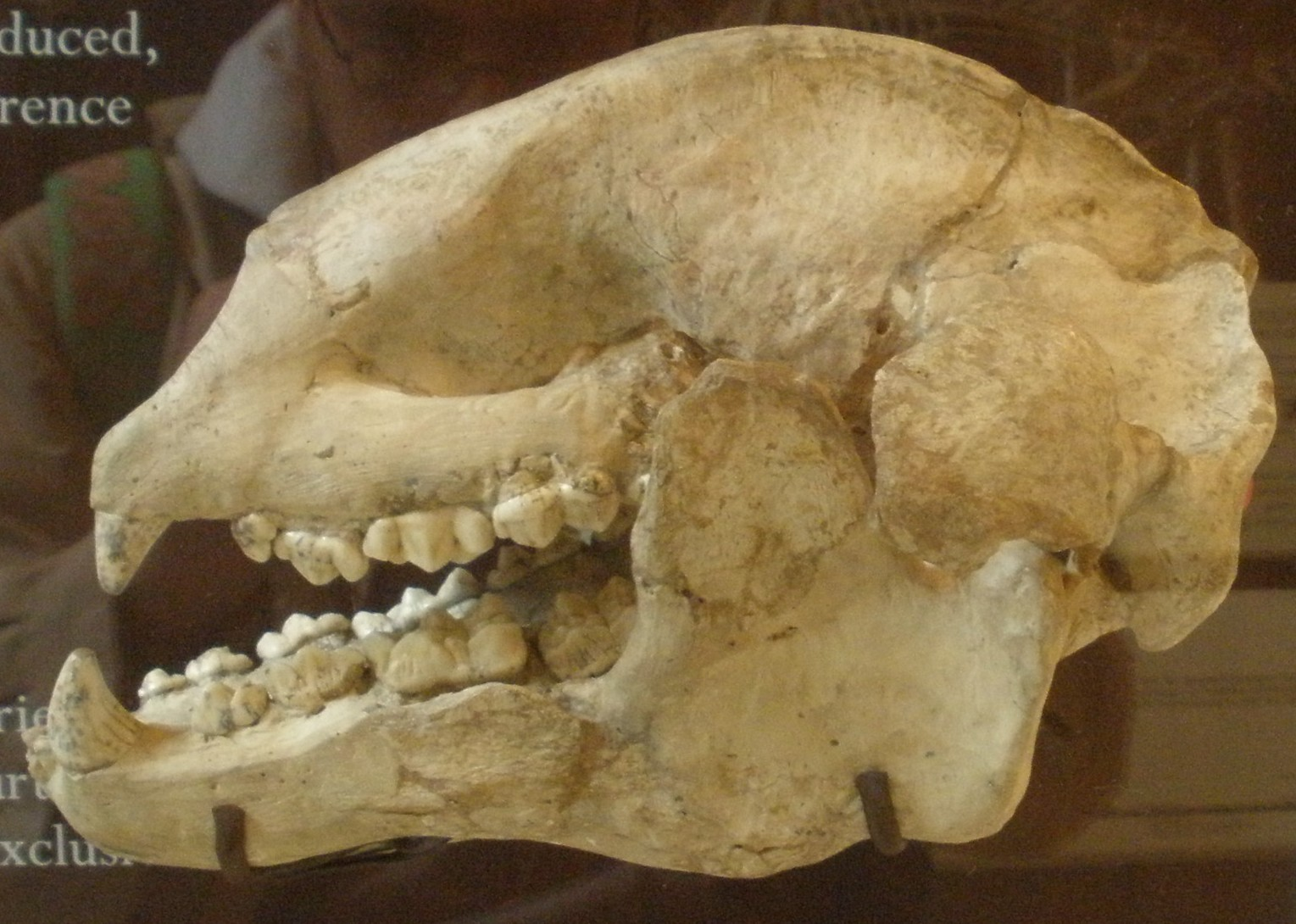
- Ailuropoda fovealis (=A. melanoleuca baconi=) skull

Scientific classification
- Kingdom: Animalia
- Phylum: Chordata
- Class: Mammalia
- Infraclass: Placentalia
- Order: Carnivora
- Family: Ursidae
- Subfamily: Ailuropodinae
- Genus: Ailuropoda; Milne-Edwards, 1870

Type species
- Ursus melanoleucus David, 1869

Species
- †A. baconi A. melanoleuca †A. microta †A. wulingshanensis

= Ailuropoda =

Panda

Genus of bears

Ailuropoda is the only extant genus in the ursid (bear) subfamily Ailuropodinae. It contains one living and one or more fossil species of panda.

Only one species—Ailuropoda melanoleuca—currently exists; the other three species are prehistoric chronospecies. Despite its taxonomic classification as a carnivoran, the giant panda has a diet that is primarily herbivorous, which consists almost exclusively of bamboo.

Giant pandas have descended from Ailurarctos, which lived during the late Miocene.

== Etymology ==
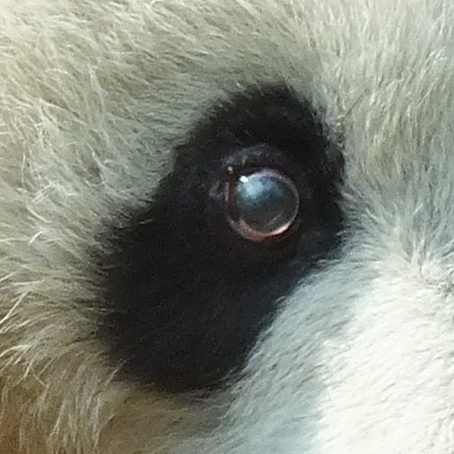
Giant panda eye

From Greek αἴλουρος aílouros "cat" + ‒ποδός ‒podós "foot" (gen. sg.). Unlike most bears, giant pandas do not have round pupils, but instead have vertical slits, similar to those of cats. This has not only inspired the scientific name, but in Chinese the giant panda is called "large bear cat" (大熊猫, dà xióngmāo).

== Classification ==
- †Ailuropoda microta Pei, 1962 (late Pliocene)
- †Ailuropoda wulingshanensis Wang et al. 1982 (late Pliocene–early Pleistocene)
- †Ailuropoda baconi (Woodward 1915) (Pleistocene)
- Ailuropoda melanoleuca (giant panda) (David, 1869)
  - Ailuropoda melanoleuca melanoleuca (David, 1869)
  - Ailuropoda melanoleuca qinlingensis Wan Q.H., Wu H. & Fang S.G., 2005

Alternatively, Ailuropoda wulingshanensis and Ailuropoda baconi may be treated as subspecies of Ailuropoda melanoleuca.

== Other pandas ==
The red, or lesser panda (Ailurus fulgens) was formerly considered closely related to the giant panda. It is no longer considered a bear, however, and is now classified as the sole living representative of a different carnivore family (Ailuridae).
