= Orangutan–human last common ancestor =

The phylogenetic split of Hominidae into the subfamilies Homininae and Ponginae is dated to the middle Miocene, roughly 18 to 14 million years ago. This split is also referenced as the "orangutan–human last common ancestor" by Jeffrey H. Schwartz, professor of anthropology at the University of Pittsburgh School of Arts and Sciences, and John Grehan, director of science at the Buffalo Museum.

== Phylogeny ==
- Hominidae (18)
  - Ponginae (14)
    - Kenyapithecus (†13 Mya)
    - Sivapithecus (†9)
    - Crown Ponginae
    - Ankarapithecus (†9)
    - Giganthopithecus (†0.1)
    - Khoratpithecus (†7)
  - (13)
    - (12)
      - Pierolapithecus (†11)
      - Hispanopithecus (†10)
    - - Lufengpithecus (†7)
      - Khoratpithecus (†9)
  - Homininae (13)
    - - Hominini (7)
        - - hominini (incl. Homo)
          - Pan
        - Graecopithecus (†8)
      - Ouranopithecus (†7)
      - Gorillini
        - Crown Gorillini
        - Chororapithecus (†)
    - Nakalipithecus (†9.8)
    - Samburupithecus (†9)

Hominoidea (commonly known as apes) are thought to have evolved in Africa by about 18 million years ago. Among the genera thought to be in the ape lineage leading up to the emergence of the great apes (Hominidae) about 13 million years ago are Proconsul, Rangwapithecus, Dendropithecus, Nacholapithecus, Equatorius, Afropithecus and Kenyapithecus, all from East Africa. During the early Miocene, Europe and Africa were connected by land bridges over the Tethys Sea. Apes showed up in Europe in the fossil record beginning 17 million years ago. Great apes show up in the fossil record in Europe and Asia beginning about 12 million years ago. Apart from humans, the only living great ape in Asia is the orangutan.

Various genera of dryopithecines have been identified and are classified as an extinct sister clade of the Homininae. Possible further members of this tribe, indicated within Ponginae in the cladistic tree above, or of Homininae or else third or more tribes yet unnamed include extinct Pierolapithecus, Hispanopithecus, Lufengpithecus and Khoratpithecus.

Dryopithecines' nominate genus Dryopithecus was first uncovered in France, and it had a large frontal sinus which ties it to the African great apes. Orangutans which are only found in Asia do not. They did have thick dental enamel, another ape-like characteristic. Orangutans do not have a large frontal sinus. The study of Dryopithecini as an outgroup to Hominidae suggests a date earlier than 8 million years ago for the Homininae-Ponginae split. It also suggests that the Homininae group evolved in Africa or Western Eurasia, against the theory that Homininae was originally an Asian line which later recolonized Africa after the Great Apes went extinct in Africa.

During the later Miocene, the climate in Europe started to change as the Himalayas were rising, and Europe became cooler and drier. About 9.5 million years ago, tropical forest in Europe was replaced by woodlands which were less suitable for great apes, and European Homininae (close to the Dryopithecini-Hominini split) appear to have migrated back to Africa where they would have diverged into Gorillini and Hominini.

Plant fossils reveal that forests use to once extend "from southern Europe, through Central Asia, and into China prior to the formation of the Himalayas". This suggests that the ancestral hominoid once lived throughout a vast area and as the Earth's climate and ecosystems changed, the ancestral hominoids ultimately became geographically isolated from one another.

== Appearance and ecology ==
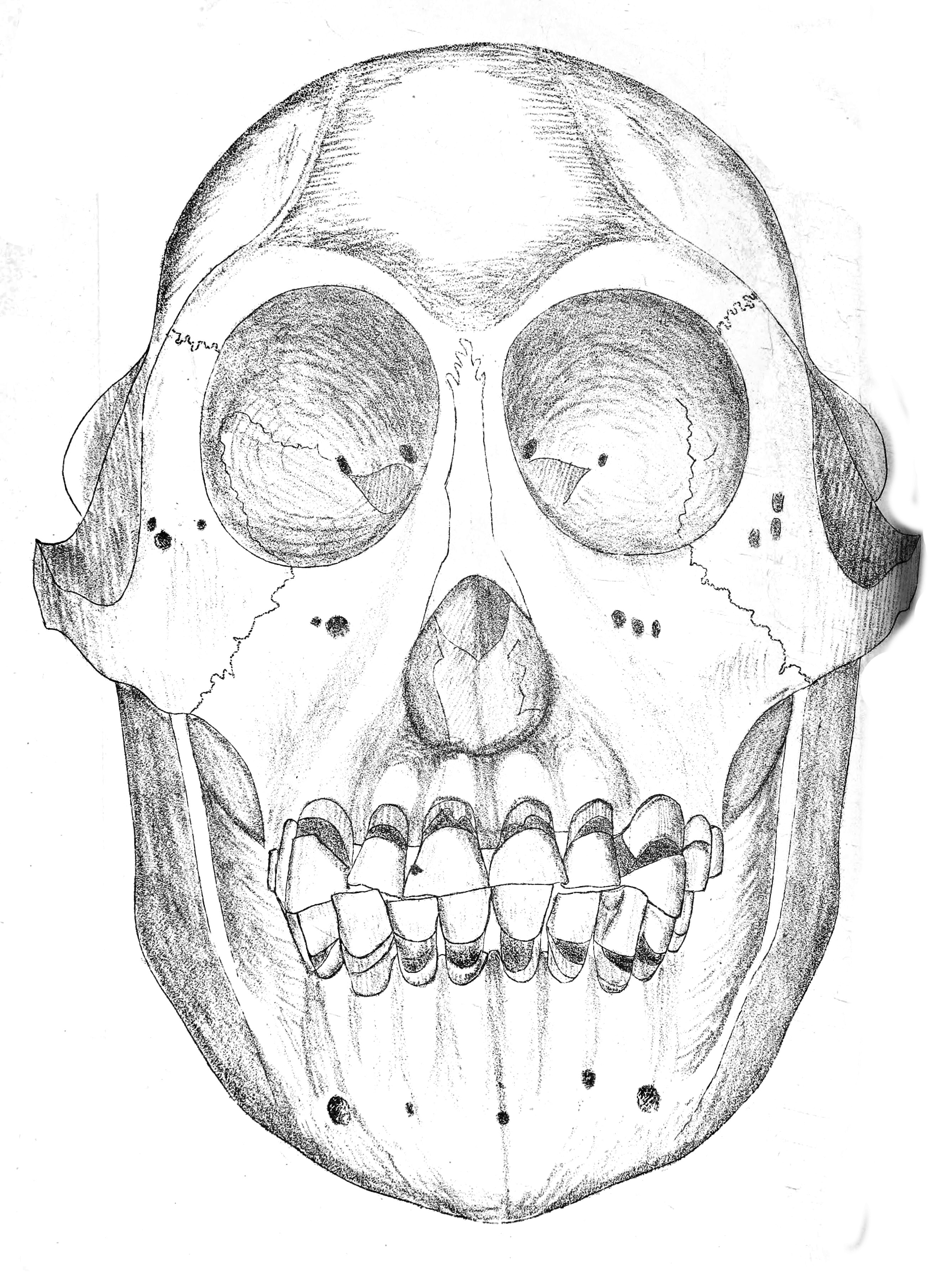
Orangutan skull showing brow ridge similar to humans

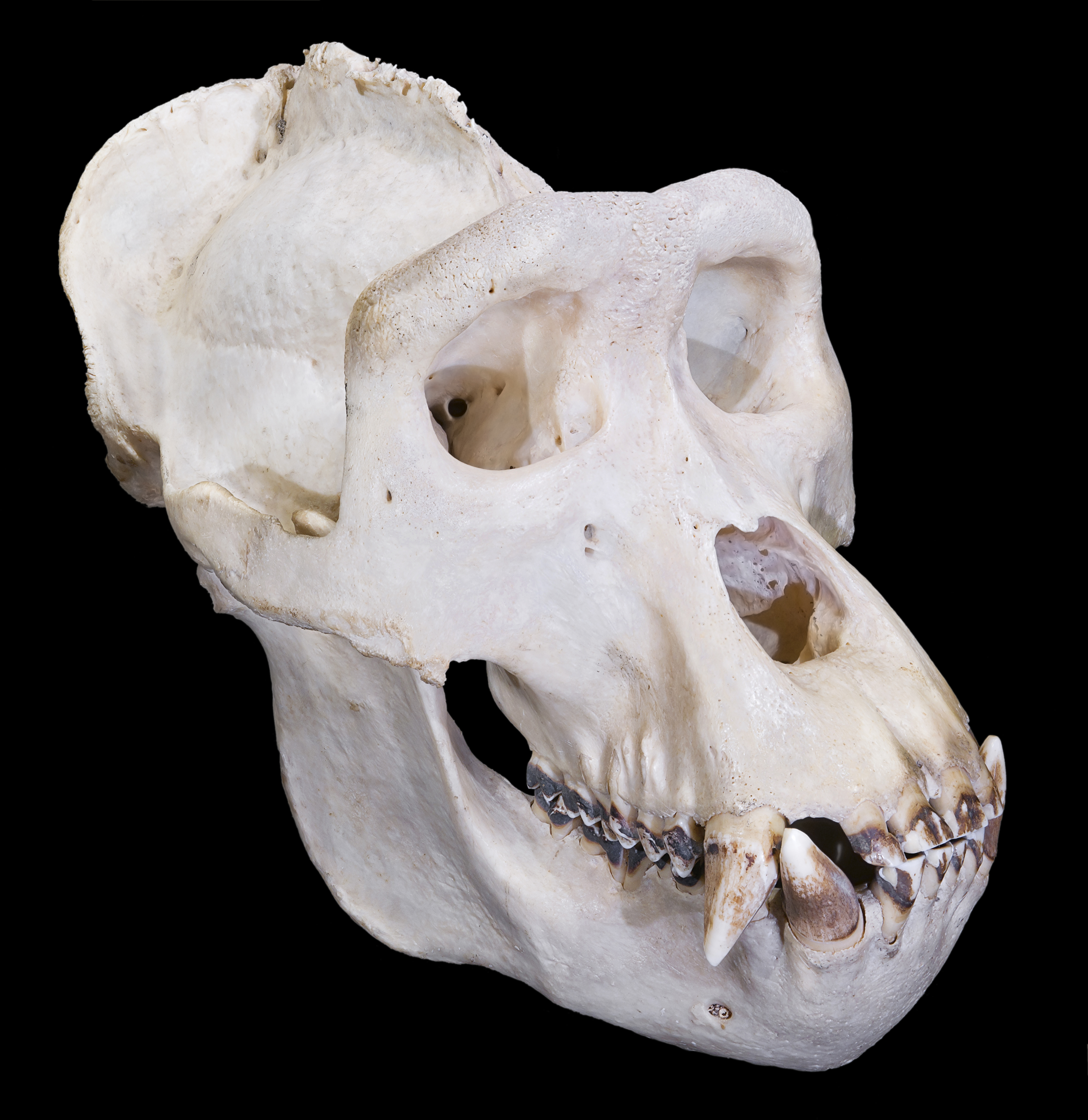
Gorilla skull showing brow ridge

The orangutan–human last common ancestor was tailless and had a broad flat rib cage, a larger body size, larger brain, and in females, the canine teeth had started to shrink like their descendants. Great apes have sweat glands in the armpits versus in the chest like lesser monkeys.

Orangutans have anterior lingual glands and sparse terminal hair like the hominines.

Terminal hairs are those hairs that are easy to see. As compared to the tiny light-colored hairs called Vellus hairs. Certainly, there is some correlation with the size of the mammal. The larger the mammal, the fewer terminal hairs.

Near the tip of the tongue on the underside are the submandibular glands, which secrete amylase. These are only found in the great apes so it is understood that the last common ancestor would also have these.

Concerning the skull, this is an example where humans share more in common with orangutans than with later great apes. We have two small ridges, one over each eye called superciliary arches.

The great apes other than humans and orangutans have brow ridges.

== Genomes and ecology ==
The orangutan genome has many unique features. Structural evolution of the orangutan genome has proceeded much more slowly than other great apes, evidenced by fewer rearrangements, less segmental duplication, and a lower rate of gene family turnover. Diversity among the orangutan populations may not be maintained with continued habitat loss and population fragmentation. Evolutionary evidence from other species suggests fragmentation will not halt diversity, but their slow reproduction rate and arboreal lifestyle may leave the orangutan species especially vulnerable to rapid dramatic environmental change.

Orangutans represent an older lineage of great apes dating from 12–16 million years ago. Though orangutans are the most phylogenetically distant great apes from humans, they nonetheless share significant similarities: equally large brains, high intelligence, slow lives, hunting, meat-eating, reliance on technology, culture, and language capacity. Experts often argue that orangutans resemble humans the most closely, showing greater bipedalism, subtle intellectual advantages, and the longest childhood growth and period of dependency.

== See also ==
- History of hominoid taxonomy
- Gibbon–human last common ancestor
- Gorilla–human last common ancestor
- Chimpanzee–human last common ancestor
- List of human evolution fossils
