= GHLCA =

GHLCA, G/H LCA, or GLCA may refer to:

- Gibbon–human last common ancestor
- Gorilla–human last common ancestor
