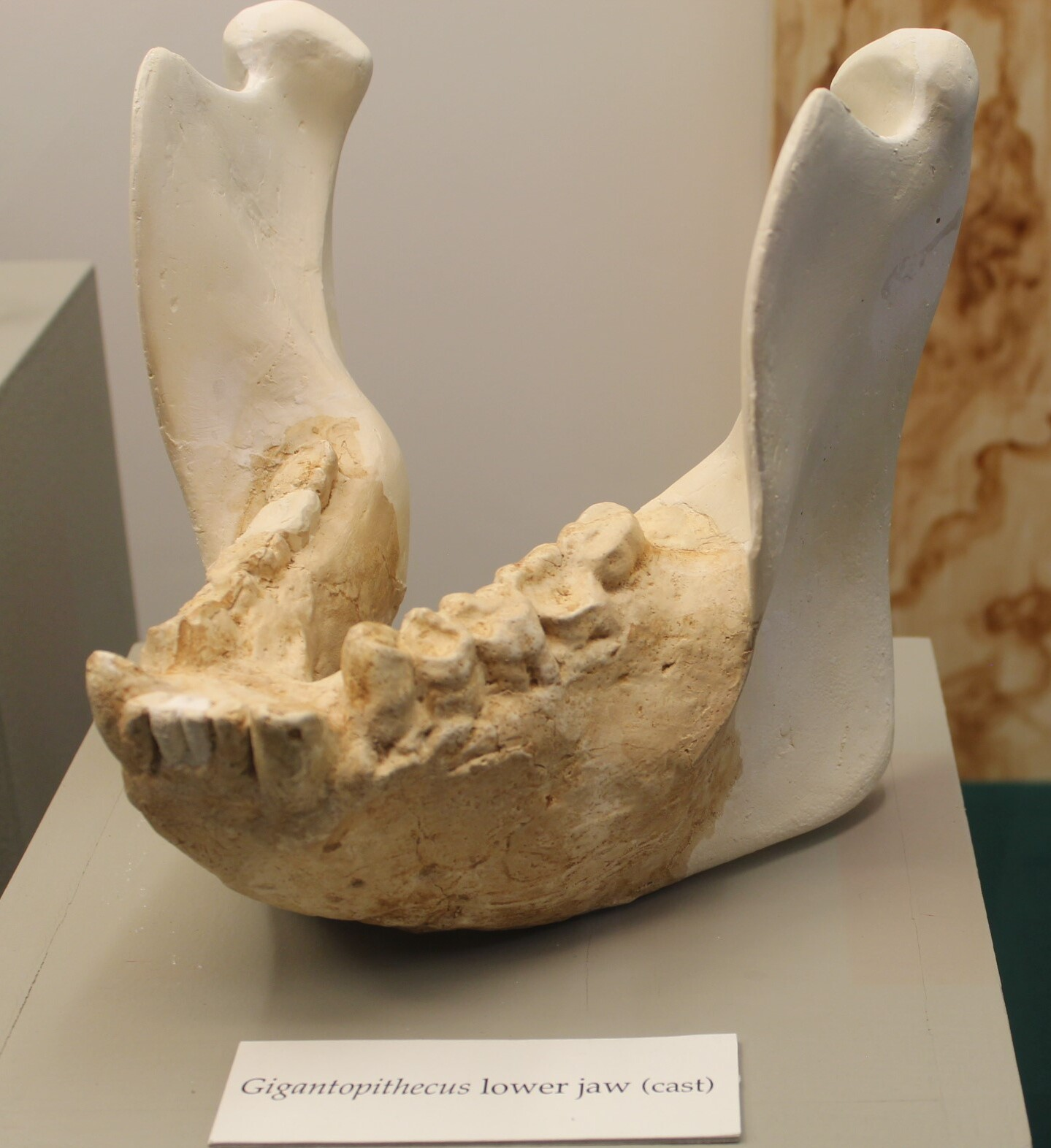
- Reconstructed Gigantopithecus mandible at the University of Iowa Museum of Natural History

Scientific classification
- Kingdom: Animalia
- Phylum: Chordata
- Class: Mammalia
- Order: Primates
- Superfamily: Hominoidea
- Family: Hominidae
- Subfamily: Ponginae
- Genus: †Gigantopithecus von Koenigswald, 1935
- Species: †G. blacki

Binomial name
- †Gigantopithecus blacki von Koenigswald, 1935

= Gigantopithecus =

Gigantopithecus Temporal range: Gelasian to Chibanian, 2–0.215 Ma

Extinct genus of primate

Gigantopithecus (/dʒaɪˌɡæntoʊpɪˈθikəs, ˈpɪθɪkəs, dʒɪ-/ jy-gan-toh-pih-THEE-kəs, -PITH-ih-kəs, jih-) (Note: lit. 'giant ape'; from Ancient Greek γίγας (gígas), meaning 'giant', and πίθηκος (píthekos), meaning 'ape') is an extinct genus of great ape that lived in central to southern China from two million to approximately 215,000–295,000 years ago during the Early to Middle Pleistocene, represented by one species, Gigantopithecus blacki. The first remains of Gigantopithecus, two third-molar teeth, were identified in a drugstore by anthropologist Ralph von Koenigswald in 1935 in Hong Kong, who subsequently described the ape. In 1956, the first mandible and more than 1,000 teeth were found in Liucheng, and numerous more remains have since been found in at least 16 sites. Only teeth and four mandibles are known currently. Other skeletal elements were likely consumed by porcupines before they could fossilize. Gigantopithecus was once argued to be a hominin, a member of the human line, but it is now thought to be closely allied with orangutans, classified in the subfamily Ponginae.

Gigantopithecus has traditionally been restored as a massive, orangutan-like ape, potentially 200–300 kilograms (440–660 lb) when alive, but the few remains make total size estimates highly speculative. The species may have been sexually dimorphic, with males much bigger than females. The incisors are reduced and the canines appear to have functioned like cheek teeth (premolars and molars). The premolars are high-crowned, and the fourth premolar is very molar-like. The molars are the largest of any known ape, and have a relatively flat surface. Gigantopithecus had the thickest enamel by absolute measure of any ape, up to six millimetres (0.24 in) in some areas, though this is only fairly thick when tooth size is taken into account.

Gigantopithecus appears to have been a generalist herbivore of C_{3} forest plants, with the jaw adapted to grinding, crushing, and cutting through tough, fibrous plants, and the thick enamel functioning to resist foods with abrasive particles such as stems, roots, and tubers with dirt. Some teeth bear traces of fig family fruits, which may have been important dietary components. It primarily lived in subtropical to tropical forest, and went extinct about 300,000 years ago likely because of the retreat of preferred habitat due to climate change, and potentially archaic human activity. Gigantopithecus has become popular in cryptozoology circles as the identity of the Tibetan yeti or the American bigfoot, apelike creatures in local folklore.

== Discovery ==
=== Research history ===
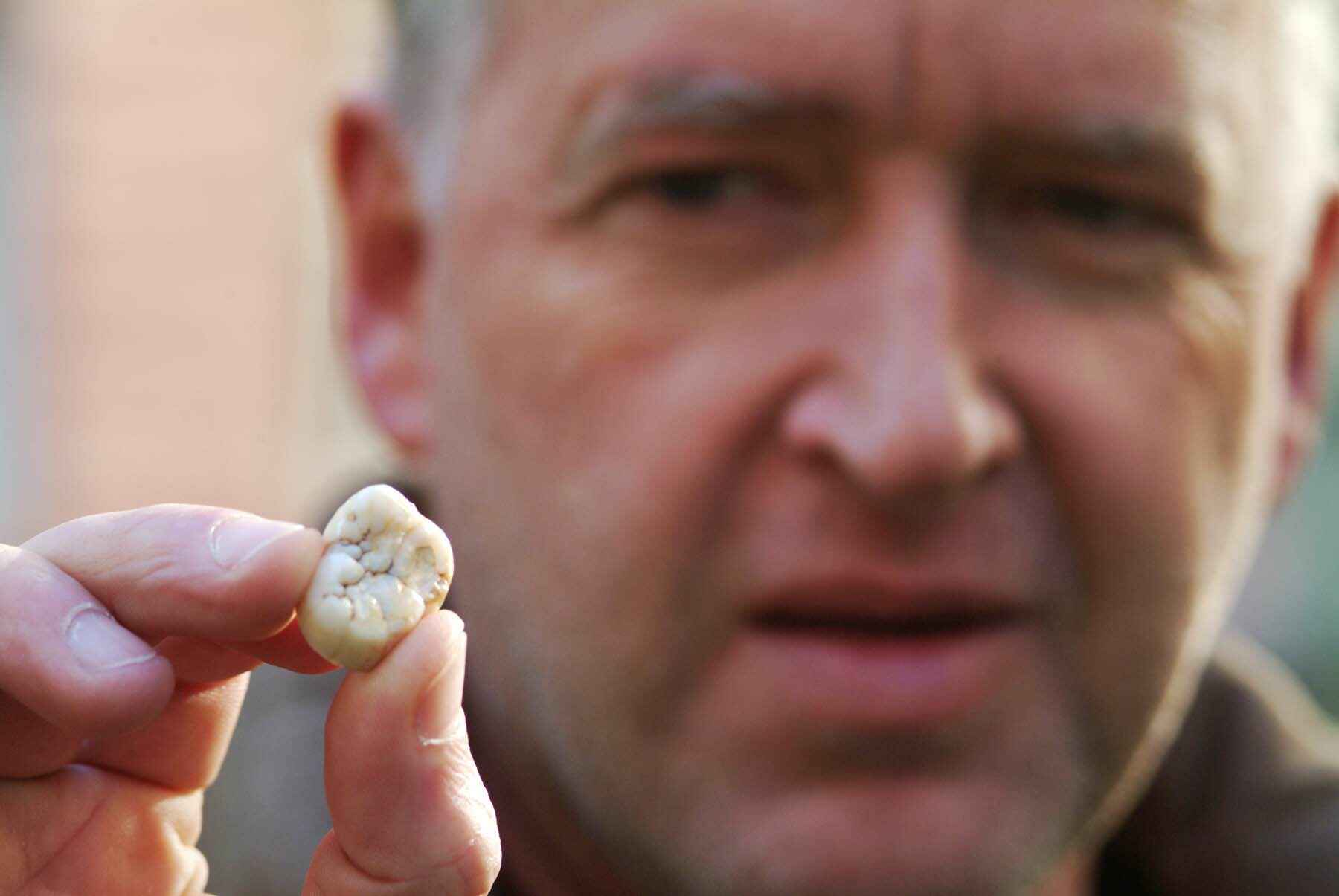
Friedemann Schrenk holding the holotype Gigantopithecus blacki molar

Gigantopithecus blacki was named by anthropologist Ralph von Koenigswald in 1935 based on two third lower molar teeth, which, he noted, were of enormous size (the first was "Ein gewaltig grosser (...) Molar", the second was described as "der enorme Grösse besitzt"), measuring 20 mm × 22 mm (3/4 by 7/8 inch). The specific name blacki is in honour of Canadian palaeoanthropologist Davidson Black, who had studied human evolution in China and had died the previous year. Von Koenigswald, working for the Dutch East Indies Mineralogical Survey on Java, had found the teeth in a drugstore in Hong Kong where they were being sold as "dragon bones" to be used in traditional Chinese medicine. By 1939, after purchasing more teeth, he determined they had originated somewhere in Guangdong or Guangxi. He could not formally describe the type specimen until 1952 due to his internment by Japanese forces during World War II. The originally discovered teeth are part of the collection of the University of Utrecht. While on Java, with the onset of World War II, von Koenigswald put the Gigantopithecus teeth in a milk bottle and buried them in a friend's backyard before being interned by Japanese forces. After the war, he recovered the fossils and moved to New York City and could not continue research on the subject.

In 1955, a survey team that was led by Chinese palaeontologist Pei Wenzhong was tasked by the Chinese Institute of Vertebrate Palaeontology and Palaeoanthropology (IVPP) with finding the original Gigantopithecus locality. They collected 47 teeth among shipments of "dragon bones" in Guangdong and Guangxi. In 1956, the team discovered the first in situ remains, a third molar and premolar, in a cave (subsequently named "Gigantopithecus Cave") in Niusui Mountain, Guangxi. Also in 1956, Liucheng farmer Tan Xiuhuai discovered more teeth and the first mandible on his field. From 1957 to 1963, the IVPP survey team carried out excavations in this area including most especially Yanyan Cave and recovered two more mandibles and more than 1,000 teeth. As of 2024, Yanyan Cave is the most productive Gigantopithecus site. In 2014, a fourth confirmed mandible was discovered in Yanliang, Central China. Indicated by extensive rodent gnawing marks, teeth primarily accumulated in caves likely due to porcupine activity. Porcupines gnaw on bones to obtain nutrients necessary for quill growth, and can haul large bones into their underground dens and consume them entirely, except the hard, enamel-capped crowns of teeth. This may explain why teeth are typically found in great quantity, and why remains other than teeth are so rare.

Confirmed Gigantopithecus remains have since been found in 16 different sites across southern China. The northernmost sites are Longgupo and Longgu Cave, just south of the Yangtze River, and southernmost on Hainan Island in the South China Sea. An isolated canine from Thẩm Khuyên Cave, Vietnam, and a fourth premolar from Pha Bong, Thailand, could possibly be assigned to Gigantopithecus, though these could also represent the extinct orangutan Pongo weidenreichi. In 2016, two Gigantopithecus mandibular fragments each preserving the last two molars were reported from Semono in Central Java, Indonesia. They were collected by a local named Dakri in 2014 who found them at the surface within 4 km^{2} (1.5 sq mi) of the Semono site; they may have been imported from China and left there since Chinese "dragon bones" were commonly sold in Javanese drugstores. The oldest remains date to 2.2 million years ago from Baikong Cave, and the youngest to 295 to 215 thousand years ago from Shuangtan and Gongjishan Caves.

=== Classification ===
==== G. blacki ====
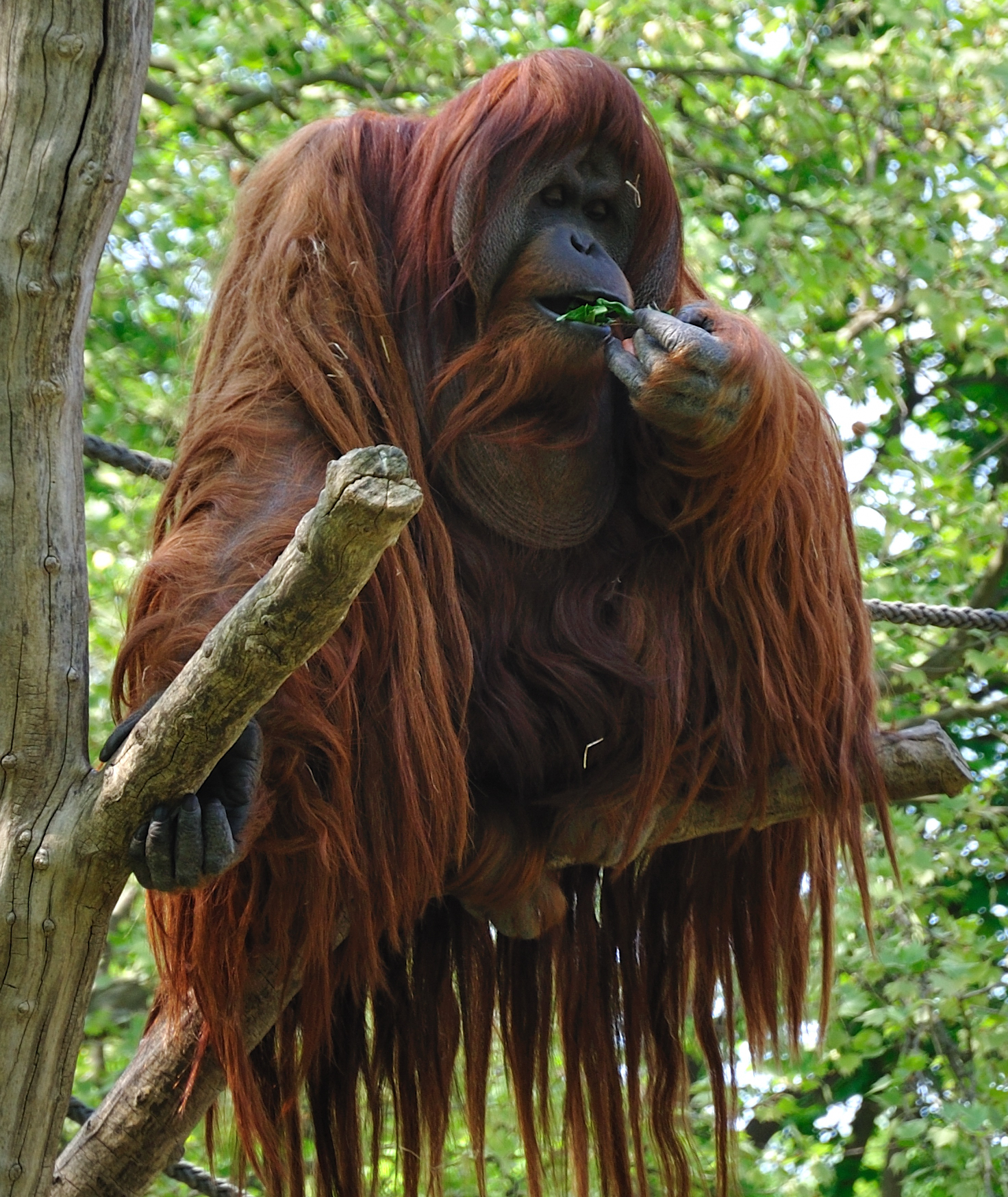
Gigantopithecus is in the subfamily Ponginae along with orangutans (a male Bornean orangutan above).

In 1935, von Koenigswald considered Gigantopithecus to be closely allied with the Late Miocene Sivapithecus from India. In 1939, South African palaeontologist Robert Broom hypothesised that it was closely allied with Australopithecus and the last common ancestor of humans and other apes. In 1946, Jewish German anthropologist Franz Weidenreich described Gigantopithecus as a human ancestor as "Gigantanthropus", believing that the human lineage went through a gigantic phase. He stated that the teeth are more similar to those of modern humans and Homo erectus (at the time "Pithecanthropus" for early Javan specimens), and envisioned a lineage from Gigantopithecus, to the Javan ape Meganthropus (then considered a human ancestor), to "Pithecanthropus", to "Javanthropus", and finally Aboriginal Australians. This was part of his polycentric hypothesis, that all modern races and ethnicities evolved independently from a local archaic human species rather than sharing a more recent and fully modern common ancestor. In 1952, von Koenigswald agreed that Gigantopithecus was a hominin, but believed it was an offshoot rather than a human ancestor. Much debate followed whether Gigantopithecus was a hominin or not for the next three decades until the Out of Africa hypothesis overturned the Out of Asia theory and multiregional hypotheses, firmly placing humanity's origins in Africa.

Gigantopithecus is now classified in the subfamily Ponginae, closely allied with Sivapithecus and Indopithecus. This would make its closest living relatives the orangutans. However, there are few similar traits (synapomorphies) linking Gigantopithecus and orangutans due to fragmentary remains, with the main morphological argument being its close affinities to Sivapithecus, which is better established as a pongine based on skull features. In 2017, Chinese palaeoanthropologist Yingqi Zhang and American anthropologist Terry Harrison suggested that Gigantopithecus is most closely allied with the Chinese Lufengpithecus, which went extinct 4 million years prior to Gigantopithecus.

In 2019, peptide sequencing of dentine and enamel proteins of a Gigantopithecus molar from Chuifeng Cave indicates that Gigantopithecus was indeed closely allied with orangutans, and, assuming the current mutation rate in orangutans has remained constant, shared a common ancestor about 12–10 million years ago in the Middle to Late Miocene. Their last common ancestor would have been a part of the Miocene radiation of apes. The same study calculated a divergence time between the Ponginae and African great apes about 26–17.7 million years ago.

Cladogram according to Zhang and Harrison, 2017:

- Hominoidea (apes)
  - Hylobates (gibbons)
  - - Oreopithecus
    - Hominidae
      - - - Ouranopithecus
          - Dryopithecus
        - Homininae
          - Gorilla (gorillas)
          - Hominini
            - Pan (chimpanzees)
            - Australopithecus and Homo (humans)
      - Ponginae
        - Gigantopithecus
        - - Lufengpithecus
          - - Ankarapithecus
            - - Sivapithecus
              - Pongo (orangutans)

==== "G. bilaspurensis" ====
In 1969, an 8.6 million year old mandible from the Sivalik Hills in northern India was classified as "G. bilaspurensis" by palaeontologists Elwyn L. Simons and Shiv Raj Kumar Chopra, who believed it was the ancestor of G. blacki. This bore resemblance to a molar discovered in 1915 in the Pakistani Pothohar Plateau then classified as "Dryopithecus giganteus". Von Koenigswald reclassified "D. giganteus" in 1950 into its own genus, Indopithecus, but this was changed again in 1979 to "G. giganteus" by American anthropologists Frederick Szalay and Eric Delson until Indopithecus was resurrected in 2003 by Australian anthropologist David W. Cameron. "G. bilaspurensis" is now considered a synonym of Indopithecus giganteus, leaving Gigantopithecus monotypic (with only one species), G. blacki.

== Description ==
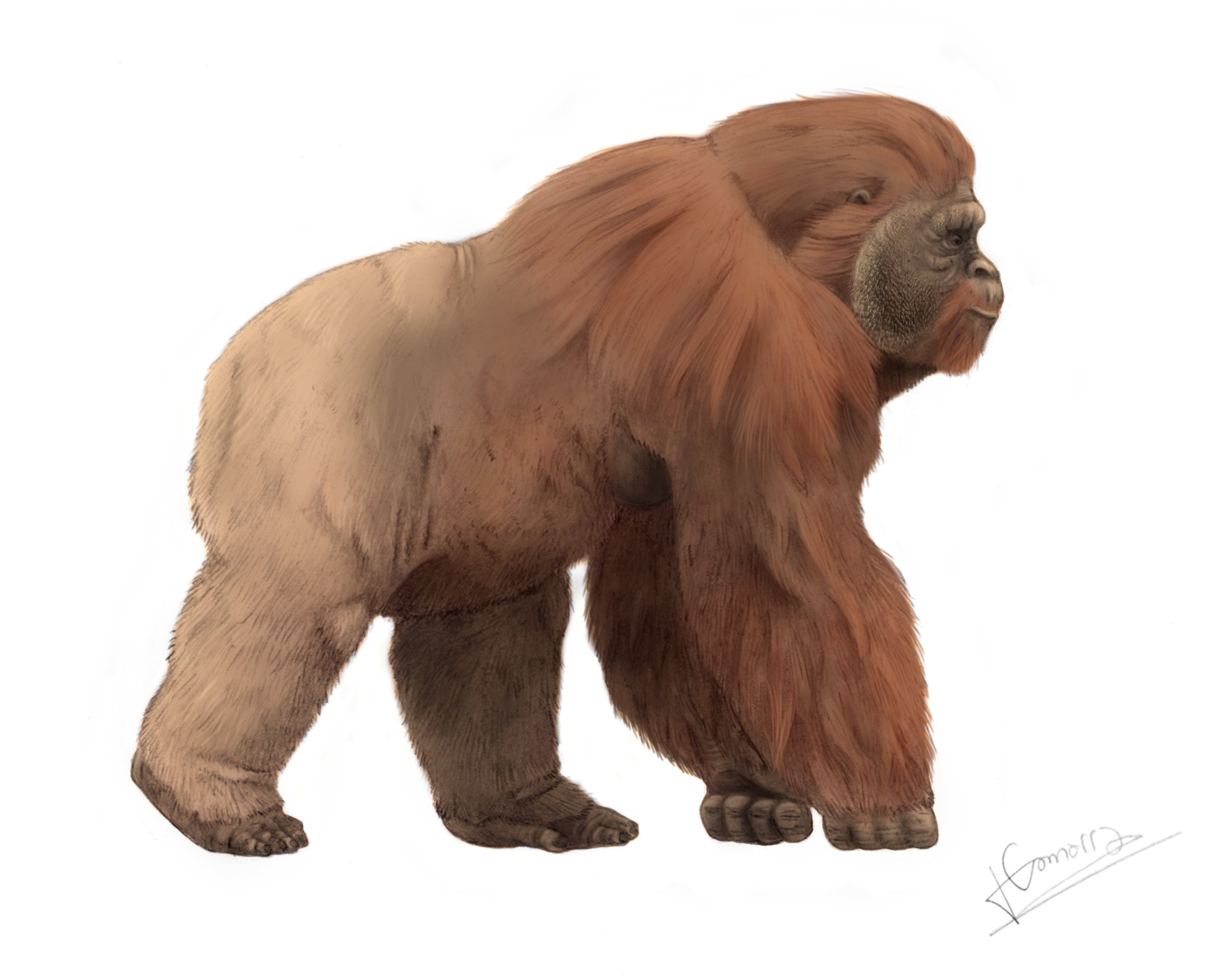
Speculative reconstruction of Gigantopithecus with a large build, gorilla-like posture, and orange hair

=== Size ===
Total size estimates are highly speculative because only tooth and jaw elements are known. Molar size and total body weight do not always correlate, such as in the case of postcanine megadontia hominins (small-bodied primates exhibiting massive molars and thick enamel). Still, Gigantopithecus is normally reconstructed as the biggest primate ever recorded.

- In 1946, Weidenreich hypothesised that Gigantopithecus was twice the size of male gorillas.
- In 1957, Pei estimated a total height of about 3.7 m (12 feet).
- In 1970, Simons and American palaeontologist Peter Ettel approximated a height of almost 2.7 m (9 feet) and a weight of up to 270 kg (600 pounds), which is about 40% heavier than the average male gorilla.
- In 1978, David P. Willoughby estimated a height of 1.85 m (6 ft 1 in) and a weight of 250 kg (550 lb).
- In 1979, American anthropologist Alfred E. Johnson Jr. used the dimensions of gorillas to estimate a femur length of 54.4 cm (1 ft 9 in) and humerus length of 62.7 cm (2 ft 1 in) for Gigantopithecus, about 20–25% longer than those of gorillas.
- In 2017, Chinese palaeoanthropologist Yingqi Zhang and American anthropologist Terry Harrison suggested a body mass of 200–300 kg (440–660 pounds), though conceded that it is impossible to obtain a reliable body mass estimate without more complete remains.
- In 2019, R. J. Hawley from the Tate Geological Museum wrote that it is unreasonable to reconstruct Gigantopithecus with bipedal standing height over 230 cm (7 ft 7 in).

The average maximum length of the upper canines for presumed males and females are 21.1 mm (3/4 inch) and 15.4 mm (1/2 inch), respectively, and Mandible III (presumed male) is 40% larger than Mandible I (presumed female). These imply sexual dimorphism, with males being larger than females. Such a high degree of dimorphism is only surpassed by gorillas among modern apes in canine size, and is surpassed by none for mandibular disparity.

=== Teeth and jaws ===
Like other apes, Gigantopithecus had a dental formula of 2.1.2.32.1.2.3, with two incisors, one canine, two premolars, and three molars in each half of the jaw for both jaws. The canines, due to a lack of honing facets (which keep them sharp) and their overall stoutness, have been suggested to have functioned like premolars and molars (cheek teeth). Like other apes with enlarged molars, the incisors of Gigantopithecus are reduced. Wearing on the tongue-side of the incisors (the lingual face), which can extend as far down as the tooth root, suggests an underbite. Overall mandibular anatomy and tooth wearing suggests a side-to-side movement of the jaw while chewing (lateral excursion). The incisors and canines have extremely long tooth roots, at least double the length of the tooth crown (the visible part of the tooth). These teeth were closely packed together.

In the upper jaw, the average size of the 1st premolar (P^{3}), 2nd premolar (P^{4}), 1st and 2nd molar (which are difficult to distinguish, M^{1/2}), and 3rd molar (M^{3}) are:

- P^{3} 20.3 mm × 15.2 mm (13/16 by 19/32 inch) in surface area
- P^{4} 15.2 mm × 16.4 mm (19/32 by 21/32 inch)
- M^{1/2} 19.8 mm × 17.5 mm (25/32 by 11/16 inch)
- M^{3} 20.3 mm × 17.3 mm (13/16 by 11/16 inch).

In the lower jaw:

- P_{3} 15.1 mm × 20.3 mm (19/32 by 13/16 inch)
- P_{4} 13.7 mm × 20.3 mm (17/32 by 13/16 inch)
- M_{1/2} 18.1 mm × 20.8 mm (23/32 by 13/16 inch),
- M_{3} 16.9 mm × 19.6 mm (21/32 by 25/32 inch).

The molars are the biggest of any known ape. Teeth continually evolved to become larger and larger. The premolars are high-crowned, and the lower have two tooth roots, whereas the upper have three. The lower molars are low-crowned, long and narrow, and waist at the midline—which is more pronounced in the lower molars—with low-lying and bulbous cusps and rounded-off crests.

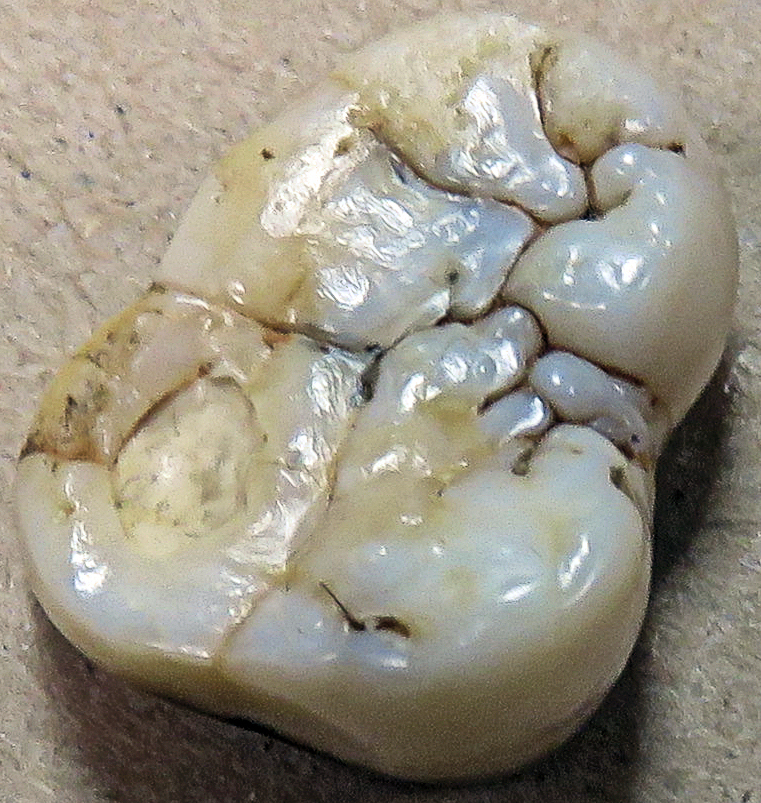
Gigantopithecus molar

The tooth enamel on the molars is in absolute measure the thickest of any known ape, averaging 2.5–2.9 mm (3/32–1/8 inch) in three different molars, and over 6 mm (1/4 inch) on the tongue-side (lingual) cusps of an upper molar. This has attracted comparisons with the extinct Paranthropus hominins, which had extremely large molars and thick enamel for their size. However, in relation to the tooth's size, enamel thickness for Gigantopithecus overlaps with that of several other living and extinct apes. Like orangutans and potentially all pongines (though unlike African apes) the Gigantopithecus molar has a large and flat (tabular) grinding surface, with an even enamel coating, and short dentine horns (the areas of the dentine layer which project upwards into the top enamel layer). The molars are the most hypsodont (where the enamel extends beyond the gums) of any ape.

== Palaeobiology ==
=== Diet ===
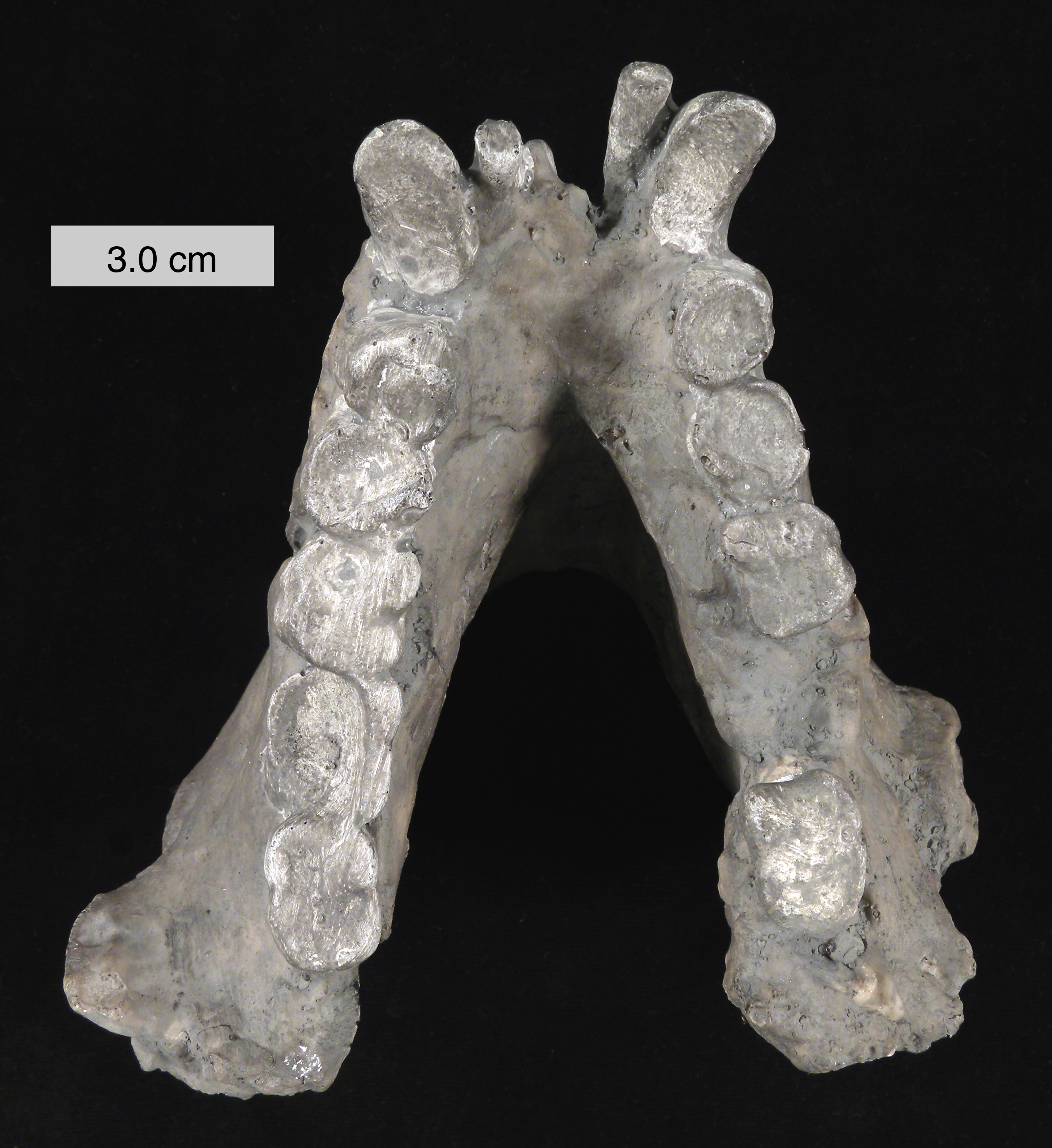
Gigantopithecus mandible, top view Scale 3 cm (1 1/4 inches)

Gigantopithecus is considered to have been a herbivore. Carbon isotope analysis suggests consumption of C_{3} plants, such as fruits, leaves, and other forest plants. The robust mandible of Gigantopithecus indicates it was capable of resisting high strains while chewing through tough or hard foods. However, the same mandibular anatomy is typically seen in modern apes which primarily eat soft leaves (folivores) or seeds (granivores). Gigantopithecus teeth have a markedly lower rate of pitting (caused by eating small, hard objects) than orangutans, more similar to the rate seen in chimpanzees, which could indicate a similarly generalist diet.

The molar-like premolars, large molars, and long rooted cheeked teeth could point to chewing, crushing, and grinding of bulky and fibrous materials. Thick enamel would suggest a diet of abrasive items, such as dirt particles on food gathered near or on the ground (like bamboo shoots). Similarly, oxygen isotope analysis suggests Gigantopithecus consumed more low-lying plants such as stems, roots, and grasses than orangutans. Dental calculus indicates the consumption of tubers. Gigantopithecus does not appear to have consumed the commonplace savanna grasses (C_{4} plants). Nonetheless, in 1990, a few opal phytoliths adhering to four teeth from Gigantopithecus Cave were identified to have originated from grasses; though, the majority of phytoliths resemble the hairs of fig family fruits, which include figs, mulberry, breadfruit, and banyan. This suggests that fruit was a significant dietary component for at least this population of Gigantopithecus. Additionally, the extremely high δ^{44/42}Ca values of G. blacki are indicative of the species likely making frequent use of mineral licks derived from rocks and soils.

The 320,000–400,000-year-old Middle Pleistocene Gigantopithecus teeth from Hejiang Cave in southeastern China (near the time of extinction) show some differences from Early Pleistocene material from other sites, which could potentially indicate that the Hejiang Gigantopithecus were locally adapting to a changing environment with different food resources. The Hejiang teeth display a less level (more crenulated) outer enamel surface due to the presence of secondary crests emanating from the paracone and protocone on the side of the molar closer to the midline (medially), as well as sharper major crests. That is, the teeth are not as flat.

In 1957, based on hoofed animal remains in a cave located in a seemingly inaccessible mountain, Pei had believed that Gigantopithecus was a cave-dwelling predator and carried these animals in. This hypothesis is no longer considered viable because its dental anatomy is consistent with herbivory. In 1975, American palaeoanthropologist Tim D. White drew similarities between the jaws and dentition of Gigantopithecus and those of the giant panda, and suggested they both occupied the same niche as bamboo specialists. This garnered support from some subsequent researchers, but thicker enamel and hypsodonty in Gigantopithecus could suggest different functionality for these teeth.

=== Growth ===
A Gigantopithecus permanent third molar, based on an approximate 600–800 days required for the enamel on the cusps to form (which is quite long), was estimated to have taken four years to form, which is within the range (albeit, far upper range) of what is exhibited in humans and chimpanzees. Like many other fossil apes, the rate of enamel formation near the enamel-dentine junction (dentine is the nerve-filled layer beneath the enamel) was estimated to begin at about 4 μm per day; this is seen in only baby teeth for modern apes.

Protein sequencing of Gigantopithecus enamel identified alpha-2-HS-glycoprotein (AHSG), which, in modern apes, is important in bone and dentine mineralisation. Because it was found in enamel, and not dentine, AHSG may have been an additional component in Gigantopithecus teeth which facilitated biomineralisation of enamel during prolonged amelogenesis (enamel growth).

=== Pathology ===
Gigantopithecus molars have a high cavity rate of 11%, which could mean fruit was commonly included in its diet. The molars from Gigantopithecus Cave frequently exhibit pitting enamel hypoplasia, where the enamel improperly forms with pits and grooves. This can be caused by malnutrition during growth years, which could point to periodic food shortages, though it can also be induced by other factors.

Specimen PA1601-1 from Yanliang Cave shows evidence of tooth loss of the right second molar before the eruption of the neighboring third molar (which grew slantedly), which suggests this individual was able to survive for a long time despite impaired chewing abilities.

Gigantopithecus as well as orangutan fossil teeth from Queque, Shuangtan, and Chuifeng cave systems have high levels of lead, some upwards of 50 parts per million. Concentrations this high may have caused lead poisoning, which can affect general health, development, and social behaviour.

=== Society ===
The high levels of sexual dimorphism could indicate relatively intense male–male competition, though considering the upper canines only projected slightly farther than the cheek teeth, canine display was probably not very important in agonistic behaviour, unlike modern non-human apes.

== Palaeoecology ==
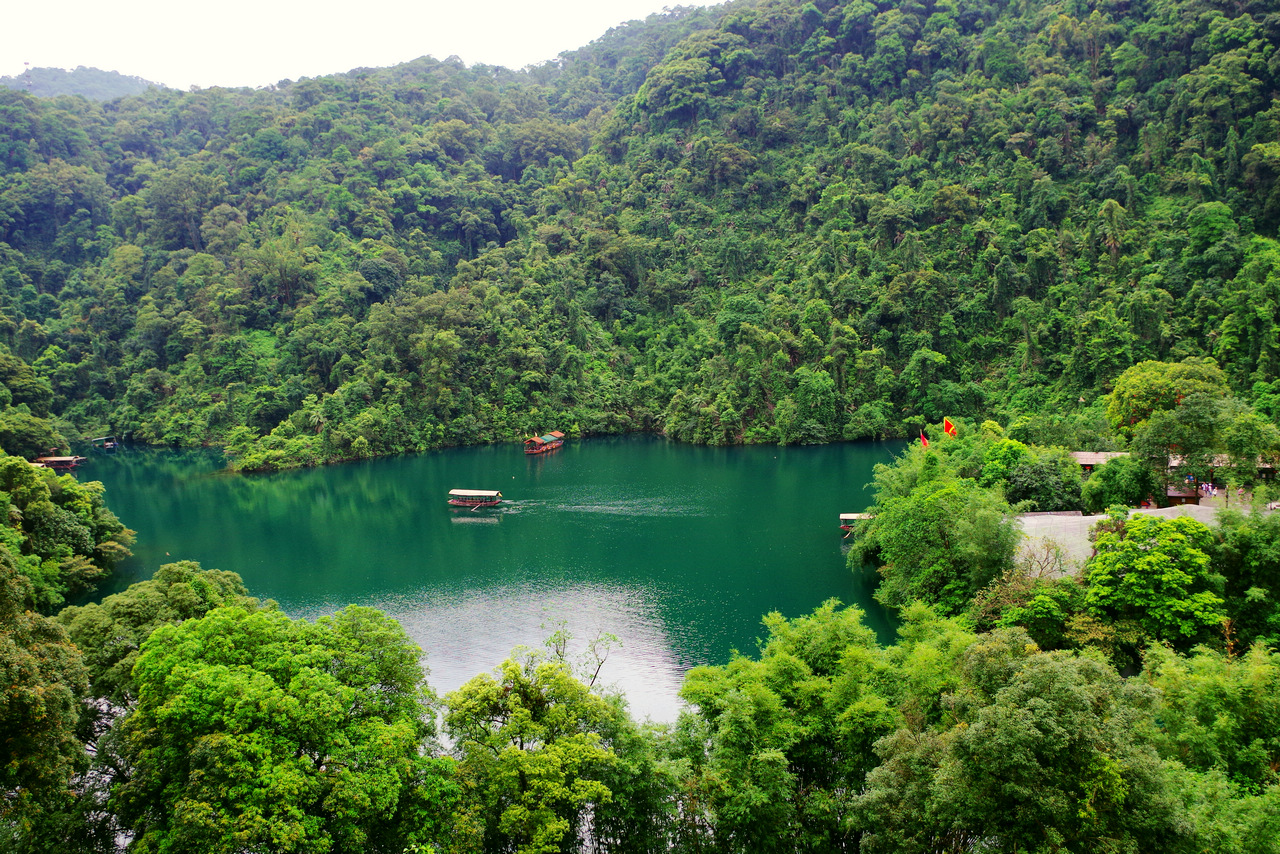
Dinghu Mountain (above) may be a modern analogue to Early Pleistocene Gigantopithecus habitats.

Gigantopithecus remains are generally found in what were subtropical evergreen broadleaf forest in South China, except in Hainan which featured a tropical rainforest. Carbon and oxygen isotope analysis of Early Pleistocene enamel suggests Gigantopithecus inhabited dense, humid, closed-canopy forest. Queque Cave featured a mixed deciduous and evergreen forest dominated by birch, oak, and chinkapin, as well as several low-lying herbs and ferns.

The "Gigantopithecus fauna", one of the most important mammalian faunal groups of the Early Pleistocene of southern China, includes tropical or subtropical forest species. This group has been subdivided into three stages spanning 2.6–1.8 million years ago, 1.8–1.2 million years ago, and 1.2–0.8 million years ago. The early stage is characterised by more ancient Neogene animals such as the gomphotheriid proboscidean (relative of elephants) Sinomastodon, the chalicothere Hesperotherium, the suid Hippopotamodon, the tragulid Dorcabune, and the deer Cervavitus. The middle stage is indicated by the appearance of the panda Ailuropoda wulingshanensis, the dhole Cuon antiquus, and the tapir Tapirus sinensis. The late stage features more typical Middle Pleistocene animals such as the panda Ailuropoda baconi and the stegodontid proboscidean Stegodon. Other classic animals typically include orangutans, macaques, rhinos, the extinct pigs Sus xiaozhu and Sus peii, muntjac, Cervus (a deer), gaur (a cow), the bovid Megalovis, and more rarely the large saber-toothed cat Megantereon. In 2009, American palaeoanthropologist Russell Ciochon hypothesised an undescribed, chimp-sized ape he identified from a few teeth coexisted with Gigantopithecus, which in 2019 was identified as the closely related Meganthropus. Longgudong Cave may have represented a transitional zone between the Palaearctic and Oriental realms, featuring, alongside the typical Gigantopithecus fauna, more boreal animals such as hedgehogs, hyenas, horses, the bovid Leptobos, and pikas.

== Extinction ==
Gigantopithecus fossil sites range across Guangxi, Guizhou, Hainan, and Hubei Provinces, but those post-dating about 400,000 years ago are only known from Guangxi. Its youngest definitive remains in China are roughly 295,000 to 215,000 years old. Two possible teeth (PIN 5792/439 and PIN 5792/490) have been reported from the Late Pleistocene deposit in Vietnam, but these could actually belong to P. weidenreichi. The extinction of Gigantopithecus correlates with a cooling trend marked by intensifying seasonality and monsoon strength in the region, which led to the encroachment of open grasslands on rainforest habitats. Because Gigantopithecus teeth dating to this time show evidence of dietary shifts and chronic nutritional stress, Gigantopothecus may have been less successful at adapting to these environmental stressors compared to contemporary great apes — namely P. weidenreichi and Homo — which could have led to its extinction. Similarly, Gigantopithecus seems to only have been consuming C_{3} forest plants, instead of the C_{4} savannah plants which were becoming more common during this time. Savannas remained the dominant habitat of Southeast Asia until the Late Pleistocene.

Human activity in southern China is known as early as 800,000 years ago but does not become prevalent until after the extinction of Gigantopithecus, so it is unclear if pressures such as competition over resources or overhunting were factors. In 2024, Zhang and colleagues found no evidence of archaic hominin involvement in the extinctions of any southern Chinese animal.

== Cryptozoology ==
Gigantopithecus has been used in cryptozoology circles as the identity of the Tibetan yeti or American bigfoot, apelike monsters in local folklore. This began in 1960 with zoologist Wladimir Tschernezky, who briefly described in the journal Nature a 1951 photograph of alleged yeti tracks taken by Himalayan mountaineers Michael Ward and Eric Shipton. Tschernezky concluded that the yeti walked like a human and was similar to Gigantopithecus. Subsequently, the yeti attracted short-lived scientific attention, with several more authors publishing in Nature and Science, but this also incited a popular monster hunting following for both the yeti and the similar American bigfoot which has persisted into the present day. The only scientist who continued trying to prove such monsters exist was anthropologist Grover Krantz, who continued pushing for a connection between Gigantopithecus and bigfoot from 1970 to his death in 2002. Among the binomial names he came up with for bigfoot included "Gigantopithecus canadensis". Scientists and amateur monster hunters both dismissed Krantz's arguments, saying he readily accepted clearly false evidence.

== See also ==
- Bunopithecus
- Khoratpithecus
- Lufengpithecus
- Meganthropus
- Pongo hooijeri
- Sivapithecus
