= Griphopithecus =

Griphopithecus Temporal range: 13.65–11.1 Ma

Scientific classification
- Kingdom: Animalia
- Phylum: Chordata
- Class: Mammalia
- Order: Primates
- Superfamily: Hominoidea
- Family: Hominidae
- Tribe: †Kenyapithecini
- Genus: †Griphopithecus; Abel 1902

Species
- †Griphopithecus alpani Tekkaya, 1974; †Griphopithecus suessi Abel, 1902

Extinct genus of primates

Griphopithecus is a prehistoric ape from the Miocene of Turkey and Central Europe.

== Description ==
Griphopithecus has been consistently grouped with stem hominoids. The material therefore indicates the range of hominoid locomotor anatomy in mid-Miocene Europe, rather than a specifically crown hominoid anatomy.

== Species ==
- †Griphopithecus alpani Tekkaya, 1974
- †Griphopithecus suessi Abel, 1902

== See also ==
- Graecopithecus
- Pierolapithecus
- Anoiapithecus
- Ouranopithecus
- Sivapithecus
- Lufengpithecus
- Gigantopithecus
- Khoratpithecus
- Chororapithecus
