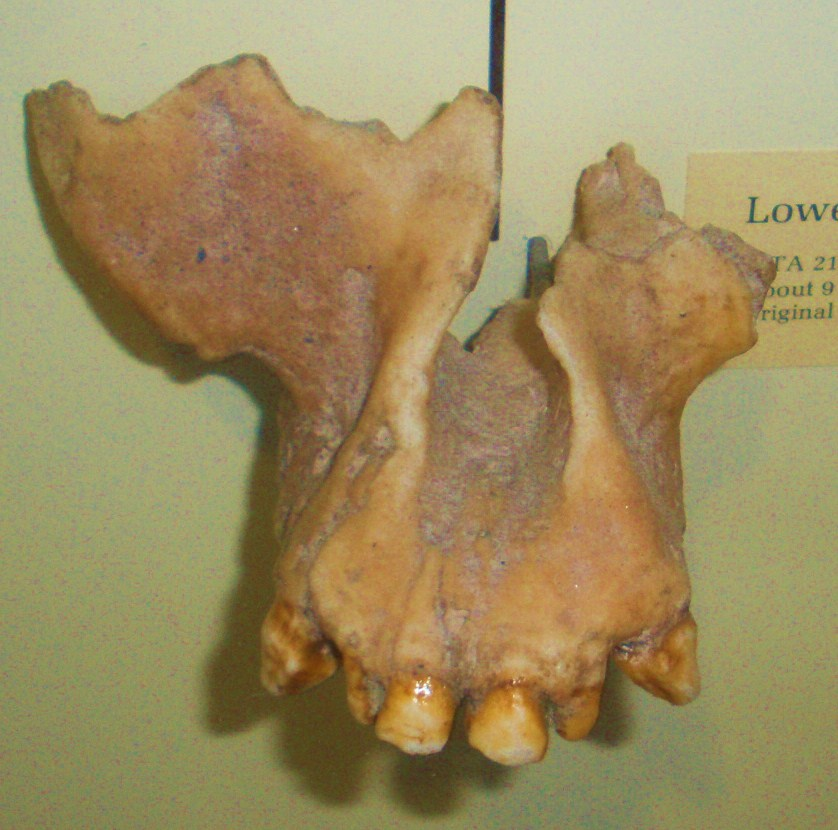
- part of the skull at the Natural History Museum, London

Scientific classification
- Kingdom: Animalia
- Phylum: Chordata
- Class: Mammalia
- Order: Primates
- Family: Hominidae
- Subfamily: Ponginae
- Tribe: †Sivapithecini
- Genus: †Ankarapithecus; Alpagut et al., 1996
- Species: †A. meteai

Binomial name
- †Ankarapithecus meteai Alpagut et al., 1996

= Ankarapithecus =

Ankarapithecus Temporal range: Late Miocene

Extinct genus of primates

Ankarapithecus (from Ankara and Ancient Greek πίθηκος (píthēkos), meaning "ape, monkey") is a genus of extinct ape. It was probably frugivorous, and would have weighed about 27 kilograms (60 lb). Its remains were found close to Ankara in central Turkey beginning in the 1950s. It lived during the Late Miocene and was similar to Sivapithecus. The genus has one species, Ankarapithecus meteai, known as the Ankara monkey.

Phylogénie des James Birx (2010) and David Begun (2015):

- Ponginae
  - Ankarapithecus †
  - - Sivapithecini †
      - - Sivapithecus †
        - - Indopithecus †
          - Gigantopithecus †
    - Pongini
      - Khoratpithecus †
      - Pongo
