= Pongini =

Pongini Temporal range: Miocene–Recent

Scientific classification
- Kingdom: Animalia
- Phylum: Chordata
- Class: Mammalia
- Order: Primates
- Superfamily: Hominoidea
- Family: Hominidae
- Subfamily: Ponginae
- Tribe: Pongini; Andrews, 1992

Genera
- Pongo; †Khoratpithecus

Tribe of apes

Pongini is a tribe containing the orangutan and the fossil genus Khoratpithecus.
