= Griphopithecus alpani =

Griphopithecus alpani Temporal range: Miocene

Scientific classification
- Domain: Eukaryota
- Kingdom: Animalia
- Phylum: Chordata
- Class: Mammalia
- Order: Primates
- Suborder: Haplorhini
- Infraorder: Simiiformes
- Family: Hominidae
- Genus: †Griphopithecus
- Species: †G. alpani

Binomial name
- †Griphopithecus alpani Tekkaya, 1974

Extinct species of primate

Griphopithecus alpani is a species of prehistoric ape from the Miocene of Turkey.
