= Gibbon–human last common ancestor =

Hominoid family tree

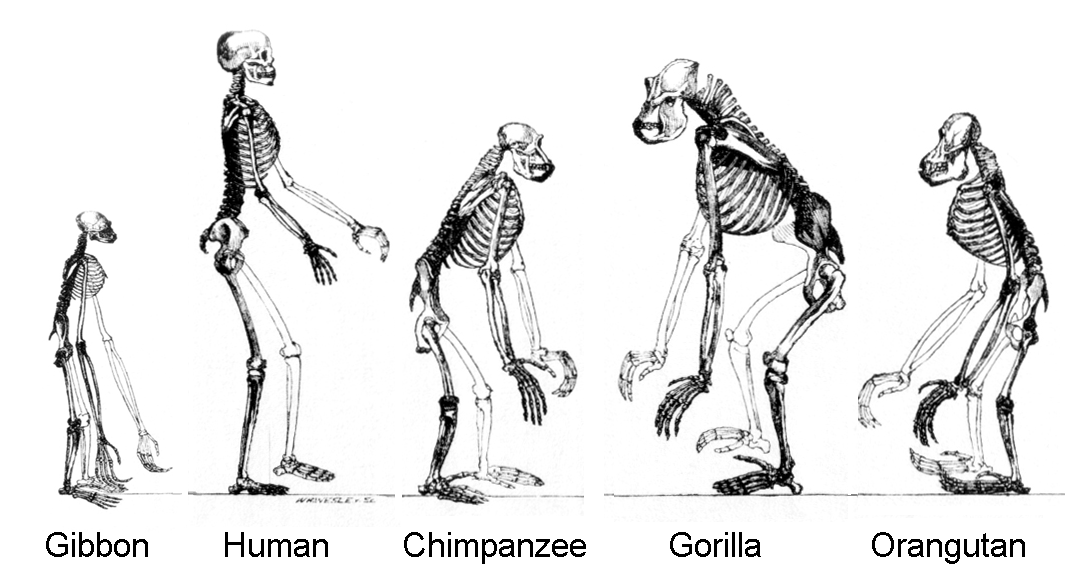
Skeletons of members of the ape superfamily, Hominoidea. There are two extant families: Hominidae, the "great apes"; and Hylobatidae, the gibbons, or "lesser apes".

The gibbon–human last common ancestor is the last common ancestor of the superfamily Hominoidea (apes), dating to the split of the Hylobatidae (gibbons) and Hominidae (great apes) families. It is dated to the early Miocene, roughly 20 to 16 million years ago.

Hylobatidae has four gibbon genera (Hylobates with 9 species, Hoolock with 3 species, Nomascus with 7 species and Symphalangus with only 1 species) containing 20 different species. Hominidae has two subfamilies, Ponginae (orangutans) and Homininae (African apes, including the human lineage).

== Evolutionary history ==
A 2014 whole-genome molecular dating analysis indicated that the gibbon lineage diverged from that of great apes (Hominidae) around 17 million years ago (16.8±0.9 Mya), based on certain assumptions about the generation time and mutation rate.

The extinct Bunopithecus sericus was a gibbon or gibbon-like ape. Adaptive divergence associated with chromosomal rearrangements led to rapid radiation of the four genera within the Hylobatidae lineage between about 7 to 5 Mya. Each genus comprises a distinct, well-delineated lineage, but the sequence and timing of divergences among these genera have been hard to resolve due to radiative speciations and extensive incomplete lineage sorting. Recent coalescent-based analysis of both the coding and noncoding parts of the genome suggests that the most likely sequence of species divergences in the Hylobatidae lineage is (Hylobates, (Nomascus, (Hoolock, Symphalangus))). Though other studies have also found different topology.

- Hominoidea (hominoids, apes)
  - Hylobatidae
    - (gibbons)
      - Hylobates
      - - Nomascus
        - - Hoolock
          - Symphalangus
  - Hominidae (hominids, great apes)
    - Ponginae
      - (Orangutans)
    - Homininae
      - Gorillini
        - (Gorilla)
      - Hominini
        - Panina
          - (chimpanzees)
        - - Hominina (Humans)

== Appearance and ecology ==
Because fossils are so scarce, it is not clear what GHLCA looked like. A 2019 study found that the species was "smaller than previously thought" and about the size of a gibbon.

It is unknown whether GHLCA was tailless and had a broad, flat rib cage like their descendants. But it is likely that it was a small animal, probably weighing only 12 kilograms (26 lb). This contradicts previous theories that they were the size of chimpanzees and that apes moved to hang and to swing from trees to get off the ground because they were too big. There might have been an arms race in brachiating to reach the best food. Also, the Hominidae, which came later, were smaller than their ancestors, which is contrary to normal evolution where animals get larger over their evolutionary development.

== See also ==
- Chimpanzee–human last common ancestor
- Gorilla–human last common ancestor
- Orangutan–human last common ancestor
- History of hominoid taxonomy
- List of human evolution fossils (with images)
