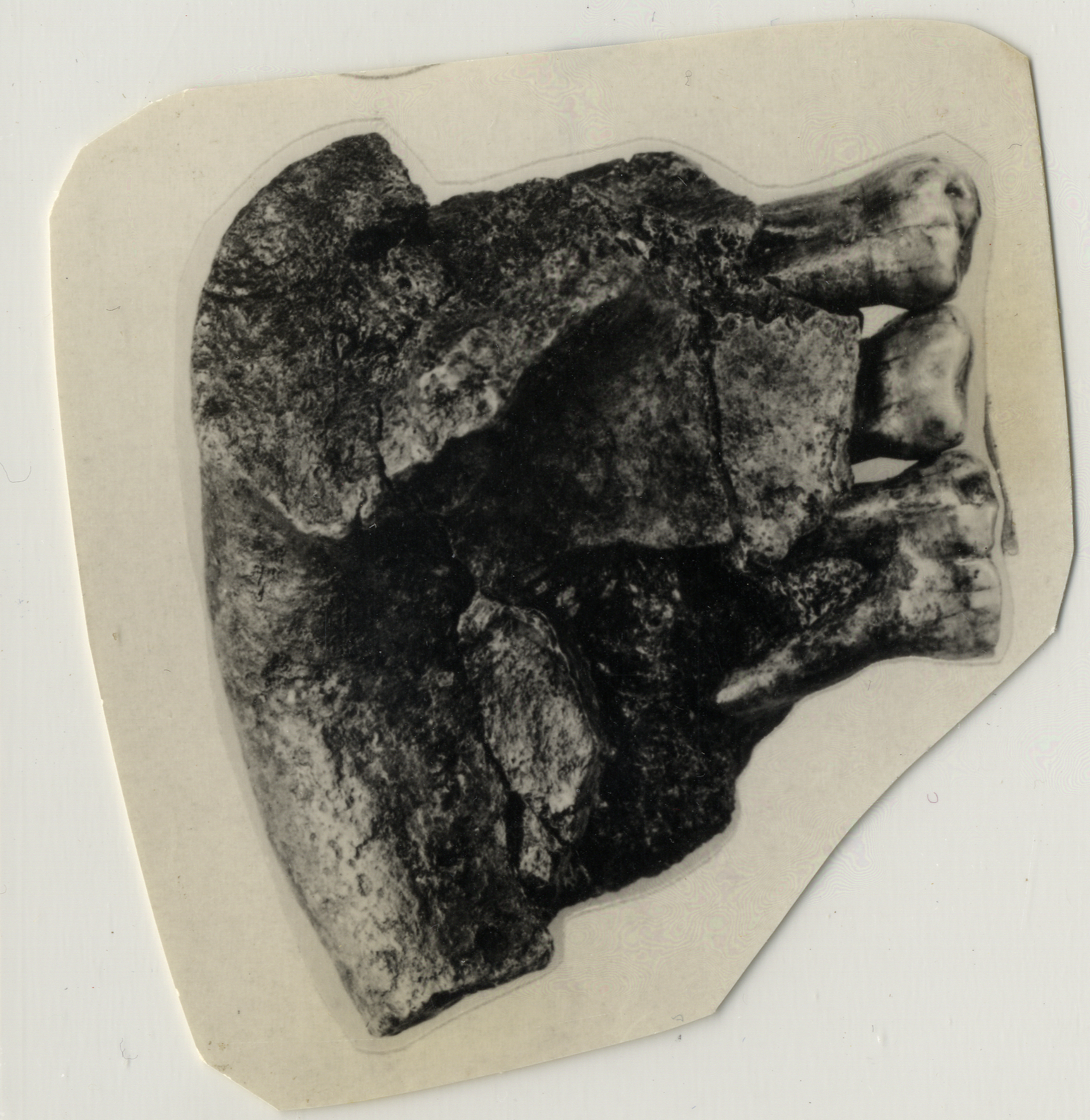
- Lower jaw of a Megananthropus, found in found in Sangiran, Central Java.

Scientific classification
- Kingdom: Animalia
- Phylum: Chordata
- Class: Mammalia
- Order: Primates
- Superfamily: Hominoidea
- Family: Hominidae
- Genus: †Meganthropus
- Species: †M. palaeojavanicus

Binomial name
- †Meganthropus palaeojavanicus von Koenigswald, 1950

Synonyms
- †Homo erectus palaeojavanicus; †Pithecanthropus dubius

= Meganthropus =

Meganthropus Temporal range: Early Pleistocene–Middle Pleistocene

Hominin fossil

Meganthropus is an extinct genus of pongine hominid ape, known from the Pleistocene of Indonesia. It is known from a series of large jaw and skull fragments found at the Sangiran site near Surakarta in Central Java, Indonesia, alongside several isolated teeth. The genus has a long and convoluted taxonomic history. The original fossils were ascribed to a new species, Meganthropus palaeojavanicus, and for a long time was considered invalid, with the genus name being used as an informal name for the fossils.

In the mid-2000s the taxonomy and phylogeny for the specimens were uncertain, and most paleoanthropologists considered them related to Homo erectus in some way. However, the names Homo palaeojavanicus and even Australopithecus palaeojavanicus were used as well, indicating the classification uncertainty.

After the discovery of a robust skull in Swartkrans in 1948 (SK48), the name Meganthropus africanus was briefly applied. However, that specimen is now formally known as Paranthropus robustus and the earlier name is a junior synonym. Some of these finds were accompanied by evidence of tool use similar to that of Homo erectus; this is why Meganthropus was often linked with that species as H. e. palaeojavanicus. In 2019, a study of tooth morphology found Meganthropus a valid genus of non-hominin hominid ape, most closely related to Lufengpithecus.

== Fossil finds ==
The number of fossil finds has been relatively small, and it is a distinct possibility that they are a paraphyletic assemblage. Due to this, they will be discussed in detail separately.

=== Meganthropus A/Sangiran 6 ===
This large jaw fragment was first found in 1941 by Gustav von Koenigswald. Koenigswald was captured by the Japanese in World War II, but managed to send a cast of the jaw to Franz Weidenreich. Weidenreich described and named the specimen in 1945, and was struck by its size, as it was the largest hominid jaw then known. The jaw was roughly the same height as a gorilla's, but had a different form. Whereas in anthropoids the mandible has its greatest height at the symphysis, that is, where the two rami of the lower jaw meet, this is not the case in Sangiran 6, where the greatest height is seen at about the position of the first molar (M1).

Weidenreich considered acromegalic gigantism, but ruled it out for not having typical features such as an exaggerated chin and small teeth compared to the jaw's size. Weidenreich never made a direct size estimate of the hominid it came from, but said it was 2/3 the size of Gigantopithecus, which was twice as large as a gorilla, which would make it somewhere around 8 feet (2.44 m) tall and approximately 400 to 600 lbs (181 – 272 kg) if scaled on the same proportions as a robust man or erect hominid. In his book Apes, Giants, and Man, Weidenreich states the following:

Therefore, it may not be too far from the truth if we suggest the Java giant [Meganthropus] was much bigger than any living gorilla and that the Chinese giant [Gigantopithecus] was correspondingly bigger than the Java giant – that is, one-and-a-half times as large as the Java giant, and twice as large as a male gorilla.

The jawbone was apparently used in part of Grover Krantz's skull reconstruction, which was only 21 cm (8.3 in) tall.

=== Meganthropus B/Sangiran 8 ===
This was another jaw fragment described by Marks in 1953. It was around the same size and shape as the original mandible, but it was also severely damaged. Recent work by a Japanese/Indonesian team repaired the fossil, which was an adult, and showed it to be smaller than known specimens of H. erectus. Curiously, the specimen did retain several traits unique to the first mandibular find and not known in H. erectus. No size estimates have been made yet.

=== Meganthropus C/Sangiran 33/BK 7905 ===
This jaw fragment was discovered in 1979, and has some characteristics in common with previous mandible finds. Its connection with Meganthropus appears to be the most tenuous out of the mandibular discoveries.

=== Meganthropus D ===
This mandible and ramus was acquired by Sartono in 1993, and has been dated to between 1.4 and 0.9 million years ago. The ramus portion is badly damaged, but the mandible fragment appears relatively unharmed, although details of the teeth have been lost. It is slightly smaller than Meganthropus A and very similar in shape. Sartono, Tyler, and Krantz agreed that Meganthropus A and D were very likely to be representations of the same species, whatever it turns out to be.

=== Meganthropus I/Sangiran 27 ===
Tyler described this specimen as being a nearly complete but crushed cranium within the size limit of Meganthropus and outside the (assumed) limit of H. erectus. The specimen was unusual for having a double temporal ridge (sagittal crest), which almost meets at the top of the cranium, and a heavily thickened nuchal ridge.

=== Meganthropus II/Sangiran 31 ===
This skull fragment was first described by Sartono in 1982. Tyler's analysis came to the conclusion that it was out of the normal range of H. erectus. The cranium was deeper, lower vaulted, and wider than any specimen previously recovered. It had the same double sagittal crest or double temporal ridge with a cranial capacity of around 800–1000cc. Since its presentation at the AAPA meeting in 1993, Tyler's reconstruction of Sangiran 31 has been accepted by most authorities.

As with most fossils it was heavily damaged, but given the completeness of the post facial cranium the chances of error in its reconstruction are very small. Tyler's accepted reconstruction of Sangiran 31 shows a double temporal ridge. The temporal muscles extend to the top of the parietal where they almost join. There are no other Homo erectus specimens that exhibit this trait. Krantz's reconstruction of Sangiran 31 as a giant Homo habilis has been found to be dubious at best.

=== Meganthropus III ===
This is another fossil with only tenuous ties to Meganthropus. It is what seems to be the posterior part of a hominid cranium, measuring about 10 to 7 cm. It has been described by Tyler (1996), who found that the occipital angle of the whole cranium must have been at about 120°, which according to him would be out of the known range of Homo erectus, the latter having a much more angled occiput. His interpretation of the cranial fragment was, however, questioned by other authorities, to include doubts that the fragment was actually the part of a skull that Tyler had thought it to be.

== Scientific interpretation ==
=== H. erectus ===
The majority of paleoanthropologists considered the Meganthropus fossil remains as falling within the variation of H. erectus. As Kaifu et al. (2005) note: "If we take the conservative standpoint that all earlier Homo populations that are sufficiently derived from African early Homo belong to H. erectus, the Grenzbank/Sangiran group is allocated to a primitive group of this species." However, there are alternate views that argue Meganthropus fossils warrant a separate species or H. erectus subspecies, proposing the names H. palaeojavanicus or H. e. palaeojavanicus based on their overall primitiveness, such as low cranial capacity (Tyler, 2001). Against this view, Wolpoff (1999) argued for strong similarities between earlier and later Javanese fossils and no species nor subspecies distinction.

=== Australopithecine ===
Robinson (1953) first suggested that Meganthropus (based on the Sangiran 6 mandibular fragment) could be a Southeast Asian representative of robust australopithecines. A similar theory was proposed by Krantz (1975) who argued that Sangiran 6 is: "entirely outside the possible size range of Homo erectus and should be classed as Australopithecus africanus" (i.e. gracile as opposed to robust australopithecine). According to Koenigswald (1973) both robust and gracile australopithecine traits can be found in Sangiran 6: "In certain respects the lower jaw of Meganthropus combines characteristics of A. africanus (premolars) with those of A. robustus (size)."

A study by Orban-Segebarth & Procureur (1983) of the Sangiran 6 mandible also concluded: "Asiatic Meganthropus 'Sangiran 6' has marked australopithecoid traits" but Kramer and Konigsberg (1994) challenge this view. According to Cartmill and Smith (2009): "there is no compelling reason to remove any of the 'Meganthropus' specimens from H. erectus".

=== Non-hominin hominid ===
The concept of a "mystery ape" most closely related to Lufengpithecus in the Javan Pleistocene was first raised by Russell Ciochon in 2009, though he still considered Meganthropus conspecific with H. erectus. A detailed analysis of tooth morphology published in 2019 found that it is a valid distinct genus of non-hominin hominid ape, distinguished from the contemporaneous Pongo and Homo by numerous characters, and again being most similar to Lufengpithecus, thus satisfying the criteria for the "mystery ape". ''Pithecanthropus dubius'' was found to be a junior synonym.

== See also ==
- Island gigantism
- Gigantopithecus
- Morotopithecus

== Sources ==
- Kaifu, Y.; et al. (2005). "Taxonomic affinities and evolutionary history of the Early Pleistocene hominids of Java: dentognathic evidence". American Journal of Physical Anthropology. 128 (4): 709–726. doi:10.1002/ajpa.10425. PMID 15761880.
- Koenigswald, G. H. R. (1973). "Australopithecus, Meganthropus and Ramapithecus". Journal of Human Evolution. 2 (6): 487–491. Bibcode:1973JHumE...2..487V. doi:10.1016/0047-2484(73)90126-7.
- Kramer, A.; Konigsberg, L. W. (1994). "The phyletic position of Sangiran 6 as determined by multivariate analysis". Courier Forschungsinstitut Senckenberg. 171: 105–114.
- Krantz, G. S. (1975). "An explanation for the diastema of Javan erectus Skull IV". In: Paleoanthropology, Morphology and Paleoecology. La Hague: Mouton, 361-372.
- Orban-Segebarth, R.; Procureur, F. (1983). "Tooth size of Meganthropus palaeojavanicus". Journal of Human Evolution. 12 (8): 711–720. doi:10.1016/s0047-2484(83)80126-2.
- Robinson, J T (1953). "Meganthropus, australopithecines and hominids". American Journal of Physical Anthropology. 11 (1): 1–38. doi:10.1002/ajpa.1330110112. PMID 13040502.
- Tyler, D E (2001), "Meganthropus cranial fossils from Java", Human Evolution, 16 (2): 81–101, doi:10.1007/BF02438642, S2CID 84714976
- Wolpoff, Milford H (1999). Paleoanthropology. McGraw-Hill. ISBN 9780070716766.
- Durband, AC (2003). "A re-examination of purported "Meganthropus" cranial fragments". American Journal of Physical Anthropology. Archived from the original on 2003-03-18.
- Kramer, Andrew (1994). "A critical analysis of claims for the existence of Southeast Asian australopithecines". Journal of Human Evolution. 26 (1): 3–21. Bibcode:1994JHumE..26....3K. doi:10.1006/jhev.1994.1002.
- Ciochon, Russell; Olsen, John; James, Jamie (1990). Other Origins: The Search for the Giant Ape in Human Prehistory. Bantam Books. ISBN 0553070819.
- Heuvelmans, Bernard (1962). On the Track of Unknown Animals. Rupert Hart Davis. ISBN 9781317848127.
