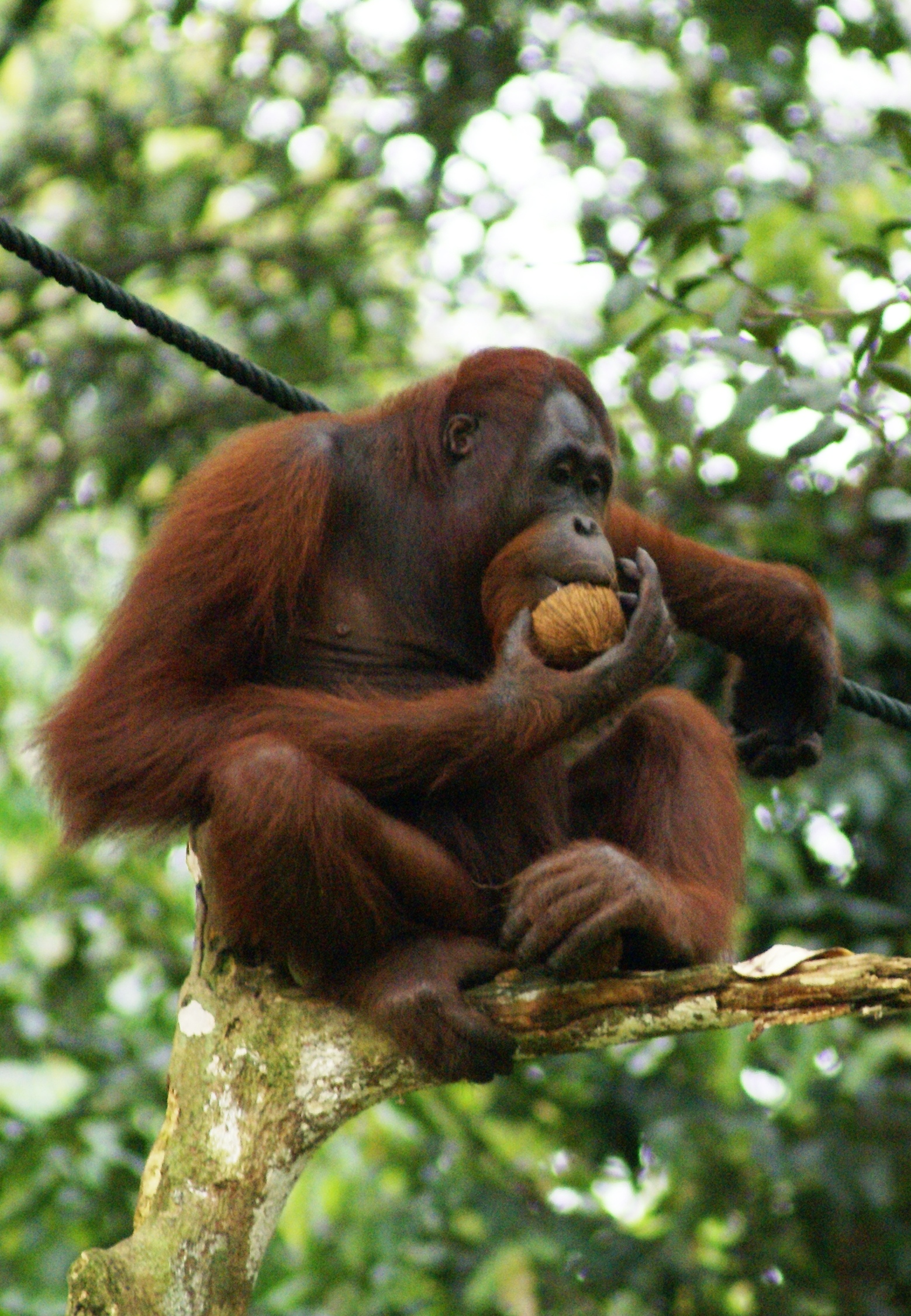
- Pongo pygmaeus (Bornean orangutan)

Scientific classification
- Kingdom: Animalia
- Phylum: Chordata
- Class: Mammalia
- Order: Primates
- Superfamily: Hominoidea
- Family: Hominidae
- Subfamily: Ponginae; Elliot, 1913

Type genus
- Pongo Lacépède, 1799

Genera
- †Lufengpithecus †Meganthropus †Ankarapithecus †Sivapithecus †Gigantopithecus †Indopithecus †Khoratpithecus; Pongo sister: Homininae

= Ponginae =

Ponginae Temporal range: 18.5–0 Ma

Orangutan subfamily of apes

Ponginae /pɒnˈdʒaɪniː/, also known as the Asian hominids, is a subfamily in the family Hominidae. Once a diverse lineage of Eurasian apes, the subfamily has only one extant genus, Pongo (orangutans), which contains three extant species; the Sumatran orangutan (Pongo abelii), the Tapanuli orangutan (Pongo tapanuliensis) and the Bornean orangutan (Pongo pygmaeus). All three species are listed as critically endangered by the International Union for Conservation of Nature (IUCN).

== Evolutionary history ==
The first pongine genera appear in the Miocene, Sivapithecus and Khoratpithecus, six or seven million years before evidence of orangutans was found from Pleistocene southeast Asia and southern China. Ponginae may also include the genera Lufengpithecus, Ankarapithecus, and Gigantopithecus. However, phylogenetic analysis in 2004, which originally found Lufengpithecus and Ankarapithecus to be most closely related to the orangutan, gave different results "under an analytical method that attempted to reduce stratigraphic incongruence", instead placing them on the base of the stem of the African ape-human clade.

Meganthropus was considered by the majority of paleoanthropologists as falling within the variation of Homo erectus. However, a study from 2019 of tooth morphology found Meganthropus a valid genus of non-hominin hominid ape, most closely related to Lufengpithecus.

The most well-known fossil genus of Ponginae is Sivapithecus, consisting of several species from 12.5 million to 8.5 million years ago. It differs from orangutans in dentition and postcranial morphology.

The largest fossil species of Ponginae is Gigantopithecus blacki, being the largest known member of the family Hominidae.

=== Taxonomy ===
Ponginae

- †Lufengpithecini
  - †Lufengpithecus
    - Lufengpithecus lufengensis
    - Lufengpithecus keiyuanensis
    - Lufengpithecus hudienensis
  - †Meganthropus
    - Meganthropus palaeojavanicus
- †Sivapithecini
  - †Ankarapithecus
    - Ankarapithecus meteai
  - †Sivapithecus
    - Sivapithecus parvada
    - Sivapithecus sivalensis
    - Sivapithecus indicus
  - †Gigantopithecus
    - Gigantopithecus bilaspurensis
    - Gigantopithecus blacki
  - †Indopithecus
    - Indopithecus giganteus
- Pongini
  - †Khoratpithecus
    - Khoratpithecus ayeyarwadyensis
    - Khoratpithecus piriyai
    - Khoratpithecus chiangmuanensis
  - Pongo (orangutans)
    - †Pongo hooijeri
    - †Pongo weidenreichi
    - Sumatran orangutan, Pongo abelii
    - Bornean orangutan, Pongo pygmaeus
    - Tapanuli orangutan, Pongo tapanuliensis
