= Griphopithecus suessi =

Griphopithecus suessi Temporal range: Miocene

Scientific classification
- Kingdom: Animalia
- Phylum: Chordata
- Class: Mammalia
- Order: Primates
- Suborder: Haplorhini
- Infraorder: Simiiformes
- Family: Hominidae
- Genus: †Griphopithecus
- Species: †G. suessi

Binomial name
- †Griphopithecus suessi Abel, 1902

Extinct species of primate

Griphopithecus suessi (or Griphopithecus darwini) is a prehistoric species of hominid from the Miocene of Austria and Slovakia, dated to approximately 15 million years ago. G. suessi is based on a single lower molar, with three other isolated teeth and two fragmentary pieces of postcrania referred to it. Austriacopithecus is a synonym.

G. suessi has an estimated mean body weight of 48 kg (106 lb), similar to that observed in the common chimpanzee.
