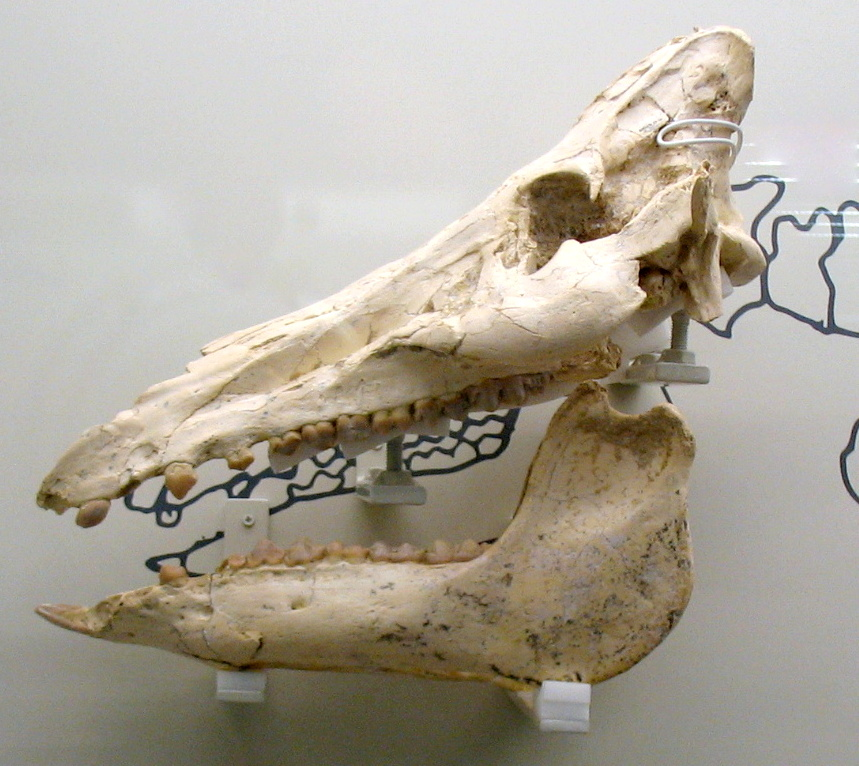
- Hippopotamodon major skull

Scientific classification
- Kingdom: Animalia
- Phylum: Chordata
- Class: Mammalia
- Order: Artiodactyla
- Family: Suidae
- Genus: †Hippopotamodon; Lydekker, 1877

= Hippopotamodon =

Hippopotamodon Temporal range: 11.608–1.806 Ma

Extinct genus of even-toed ungulates

Hippopotamodon is a genus of extinct suid even-toed ungulates that existed during the Miocene to the Pleistocene in Europe and Asia.
