= Gorilla–human last common ancestor =

The gorilla–human last common ancestor (GHLCA, GLCA, or G/H LCA) is the last species that the tribes Hominini and Gorillini (i.e. the chimpanzee–human last common ancestor on one hand and gorillas on the other) share as a common ancestor. It is estimated to have lived 8 to 10 million years ago (T_{GHLCA}) during the late Miocene.

The fossil find of Nakalipithecus nakayamai are closest in age to the GHLCA.

The GHLCA marks a pivotal evolutionary split within the Homininae subfamily, separating the lineage that led to gorillas (Gorilla gorilla and Gorilla beringei) from the lineage that eventually gave rise to chimpanzees, bonobos and humans.

This ancestor is part of the larger African ape lineage, which also includes the chimpanzee—human last common ancestor (Pan and Homo genera).

The divergence of the gorilla lineage likely coincided with significant environmental changes, such as the shrinking of tropical forests during the Miocene. Based on genomic analysis, this ancestor lived around 10 million years ago.

== See also ==
- Gibbon–human last common ancestor
- History of hominoid taxonomy
- List of human evolution fossils (with images)
- Orangutan–human last common ancestor
