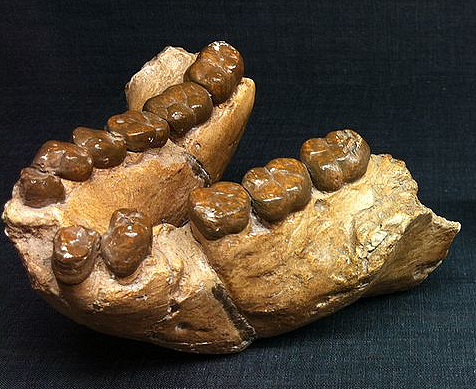
- Indopithecus jaw at the Institut Català de Paleontologia Miquel Crusafont in Sabadell, Catalonia

Scientific classification
- Kingdom: Animalia
- Phylum: Chordata
- Class: Mammalia
- Infraclass: Placentalia
- Order: Primates
- Superfamily: Hominoidea
- Family: Hominidae
- Genus: †Indopithecus von Koenigswald, 1950
- Species: †I. giganteus

Binomial name
- †Indopithecus giganteus (Pilgrim, 1915)

= Indopithecus =

Indopithecus Temporal range: Miocene

Extinct genus of primates

Indopithecus giganteus (lit. 'Indian ape') is an extinct species of large great ape that lived in the late Miocene of the Siwalik Hills in northern India. Although frequently assigned to the more well-known genus Gigantopithecus, recent authors consider it to be a distinct genus in its own right.

== Fossils and description ==
Indopithecus is known only from teeth and jawbones found in the late Miocene of the Siwalik Hills, India. Based on the slim fossil finds, it was a large, ground-dwelling herbivore that ate primarily bamboo and foliage. Despite the specific name, it was approximately half the length of its Chinese relative, Gigantopithecus blacki.

Indopithecus giganteus was originally named as a species of the European ape Dryopithecus, D. giganteus, by Guy Ellcock Pilgrim in 1915, based on a large lower third molar, holotype GSI-D175. However, George Edward Lewis in 1937 decided that Pilgrim's taxon was not congeneric with Dryopithecus and instead referred the molar to the co-eval ape Sivapithecus indicus. Gustav Heinrich Ralph von Koenigswald in 1950 recognized D. giganteus as being distinct from Dryopithecus and Sivapithecus and erected a new genus for it, Indopithecus ("ape from India"). Szalay and Delson (1979) found similarities of the Indopithecus material to Gigantopithecus and synonymized the two genera, treating I. giganteus as a referred species, G. giganteus. However, recent authors, including David Cameron (2001, 2003), Pickford (2010), Patnaik (2014), Begun (2015), and Welker et al. (2019), have argued that Indopithecus should be treated as generically distinct in its own right.

Gigantopithecus bilaspurensis was erected by Elwyn LaVerne Simons and Chopra (1969) for paired lower jaw bones and teeth from deposits in the Siwalk Hills of India dating to approximately 6 to 9 million years ago in the Miocene, specimen Chandigarh-Yale Project No. 359/68, in April 1968 found by G.E. Meyer. The specific name refers to Bilaspur. Szalay and Delson (1979) recognized G. bilaspurensis as indistinguishable from known remains of Gigantopithecus giganteus, and synonymized the two taxa. Although giganteus is clearly related to G. blacki, Kelly (2002) and Cameron (2001, 2003) agreed with Szalay and Delson (1979) that bilaspurensis is a junior synonym of giganteus.
