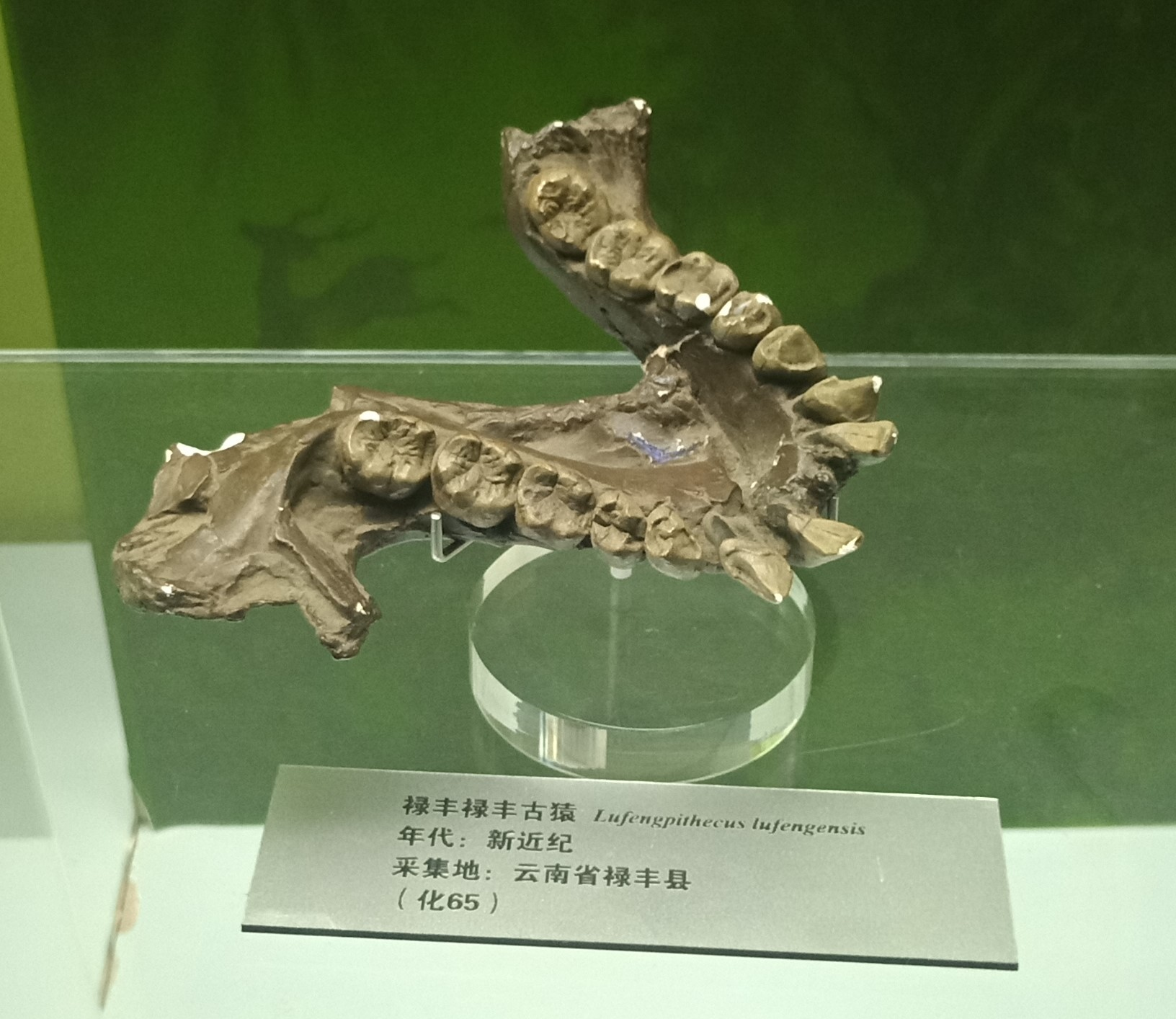
- A lower jaw fossil collected in Yunnan Provincial Museum

Scientific classification
- Kingdom: Animalia
- Phylum: Chordata
- Class: Mammalia
- Infraclass: Placentalia
- Order: Primates
- Superfamily: Hominoidea
- Family: Hominidae
- Tribe: †Lufengpithecini
- Genus: †Lufengpithecus; Wu, 1987

Species
- See text

Synonyms
- Ramapithecus lufengensis Xu et al., 1978

= Lufengpithecus =

Lufengpithecus Temporal range: Late Miocene

Extinct genus of primates

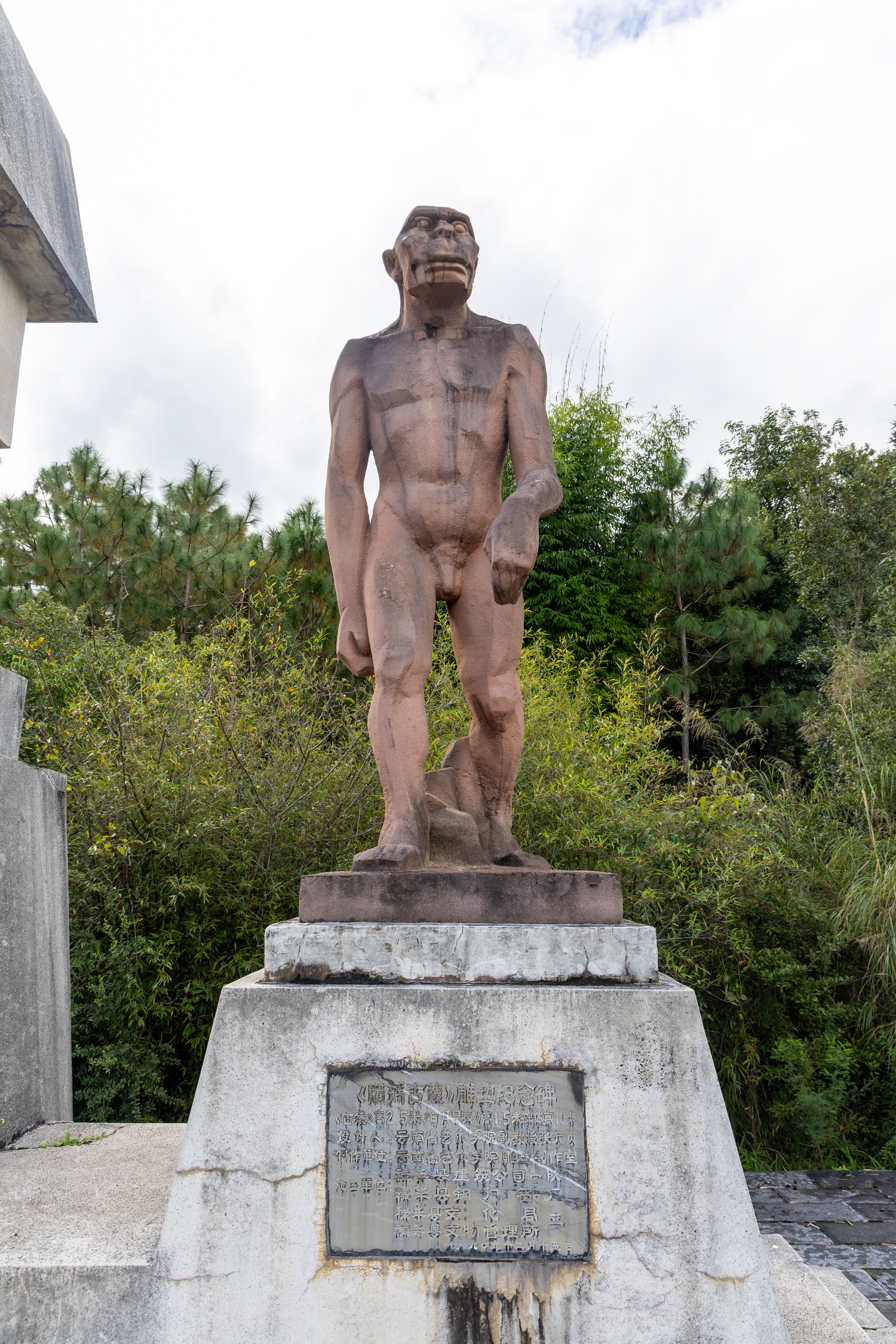
Statue of Lufengpithecus at Shihuiba, Lufeng, Yunnan, where the fossil unearthed

Lufengpithecus (from Lufeng County, and Ancient Greek πίθηκος (píthēkos), meaning "ape, monkey") is an extinct genus of ape, known from the Late Miocene of East Asia. It is known from thousands of dental remains and a few skulls and probably weighed about 50 kg (110 lb). It contains three species: L. lufengensis, L. hudienensis and L. keiyuanensis. Lufengpithecus lufengensis is from the Late Miocene found in China, named after the Lufeng site and dated around 6.2 Ma. Lufengpithecus is either thought to be the sister group to Ponginae, or the sister to the clade containing Ponginae and Homininae.

== Characteristics ==
Like Sivapithecus, Lufengpithecus had heavy molars and large canine teeth. The lower third premolars sometimes have a slight second cusp, denoting a shift from their principal role as cutting teeth in other ape species.

While Lufengpithecus is generally considered to be a primitive pongine by most Western observers, Chinese scientists have noted a set of features that are more reminiscent of hominines. These include a broad interorbital distance, an "African" subnasal morphology, frontal sinuses, and a number of dental similarities. Also, basicranial and postcranial remains indicate it may have had adaptations for a significant degree of bipedalism. The ultimate position of Lufengpithecus in hominoid phylogeny requires more research.

A single mandibular fragment with P4 and M1 from the site of Longgupo in Sichuan, China, originally assigned to the genus Homo, has been argued to be similar to Lufengpithecus, suggesting the genus may have survived until as recently as two million years ago, possibly overlapping with both Gigantopithecus and ancient Pongo in the region. One of the original authors who assigned the Longgupo specimen to Homo now considers it to be a "mystery ape".

A possibly related species from Thailand was assigned to the genus Khoratpithecus under the specific name chiangmuanensis. The species is known only from teeth, which appear to be intermediate in morphology between Sivapithecus and modern orangutans. The species lived about 10 million years ago and may have been the ancestor of modern orangutans.

== Taxonomy ==
There are three known species of Lufengpithecus: L. keiyuanensis from near Kaiyuan in the Xiaolongtan Basin (10-11mya), L. hudienensis from Yuanmou Basin (7.1-8.2mya), and L. lufengensis from Shihuiba in the Lufeng Basin (6.2-6.9mya). Some argue that this taxa is a distinct clade of late Miocene East Asian hominoids that are not closely related to any extant taxa. In fact, compared to YV0999 (a cranium of L. hudienensis from Yuanmou), there may have been a high degree of local endemism of apes during this time, due to the wide differences between the two species. This fits with the topographic data of Southwest China at the time, which was subject to uplift and erosion, which created the complex topography of mountain ranges and basins that is still present in current day.

=== Lufengpithecus lufengensis ===
Lufengpithecus lufengensis is an extinct ape recovered from lignite (soft coal) beds at the Shihuiba Locality in Lufeng County, Yunnan, China, dating to the latest Miocene. It was originally thought to represent two distinct species, Sivapithecus yunnanensis, thought to be an ancestor of Pongo (orangutans), and Ramapithecus lufengensis, thought to be an early human ancestor. The recognition in the 1980s that "Ramapithecus" fossils were females of Sivapithecus led to the creation of the new genus and species Lufengpithecus lufengensis to accommodate the large collection of hominoid fossils recovered at Lufeng in the 1970s. The species was recognized to have a very large degree of sexual dimorphism, more comparable to that seen in cercopithecoid monkeys than in any living ape. The fossil remains from Shihuiba included a number of relatively complete but badly crushed crania of both male and female specimens.

A series of excavations were done between 1975 and 1983 which recovered five skulls, tens of mandibles, hundreds of isolated teeth and some post-cranial bones of the species.

=== Lufengpithecus hudienensis ===
Lufengpithecus hudienensis was excavated in the 1980s and 1990s from a number of localities in Yuanmou County, Yunnan, China. The specimens include a large number of teeth, mandibular and maxillary fragments and the facial skeleton of a juvenile. The skull is quite distinct from that of L. lufengensis, suggesting high rates of endemism in this time and region.

=== Lufengpithecus keiyuanensis ===
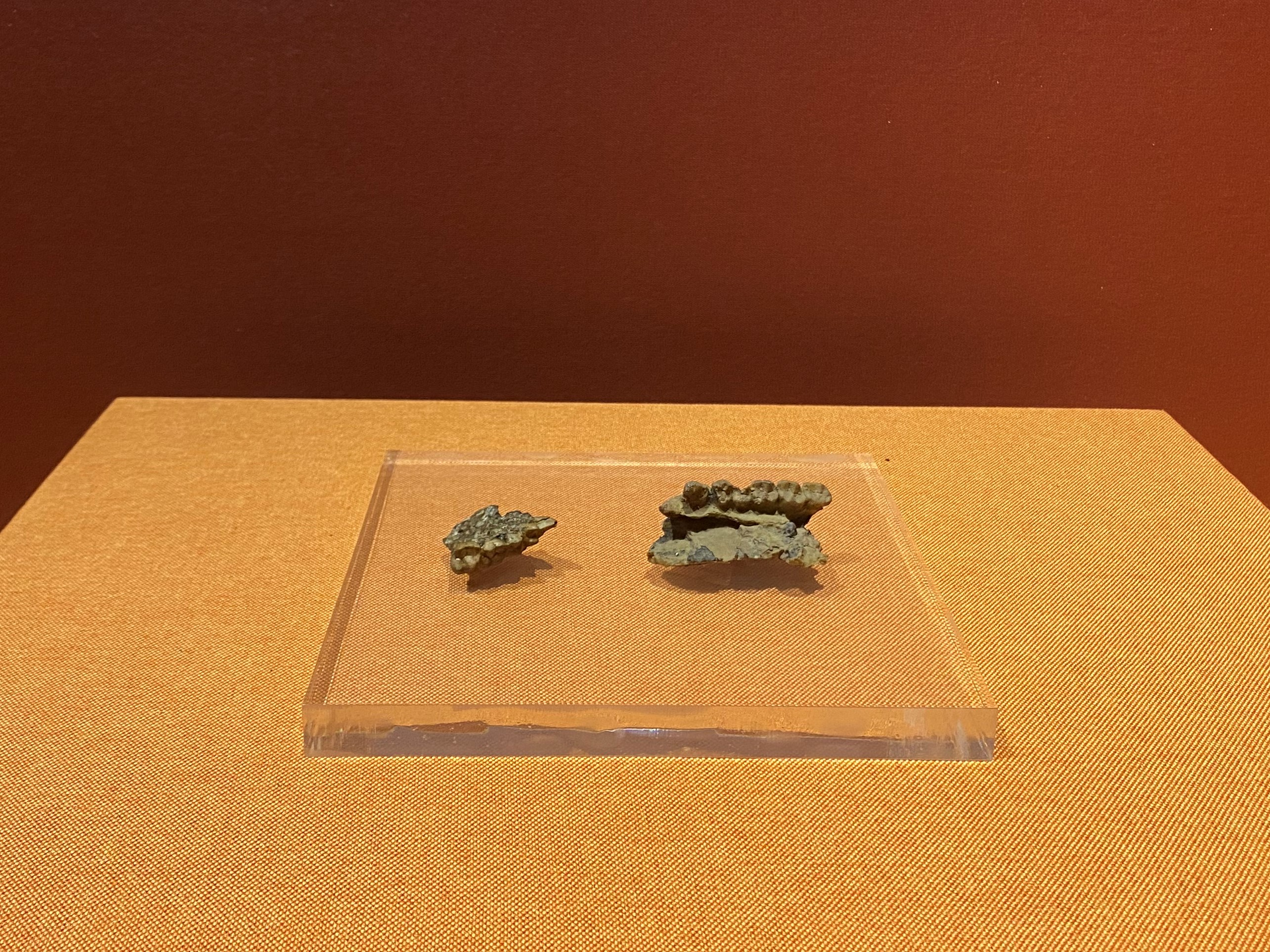
A replica of maxillary tooth fossil of keiyuanensis, collected in Honghe Prefectural Museum

Ape fossils collected in the 1950s at Keiyuan County in Yunnan originally attributed to Dryopithecus keiyuanensis were subsequently assigned to Lufengpithecus keiyuanensis.

== Discovery ==
In the Lufeng region of China, a Miocene hominoid site, a series of excavations were untaken between 1975 and 1983 which recovered five skulls, tens of mandibles, hundreds of isolated teeth and some post-cranial bones of the species.

Specimens include:

- ZT 299, a relatively complete juvenile male cranium found in the Zhaotong Basin in Yunnan Province of Southeast China. While it was partly broken during recovery, it encountered almost no distortion beforehand. It has prominent, robust arching supraorbital costae, and eye orbits that are broader than they are tall, more so than any extant great apes. However, these still fall within the range of Pongo orbital height and width, although it does not have any of the key features of the genus or any of the African apes. It is only the second relatively complete cranium uncovered of this species.
- PA 644, an adult crania discovered in 1987 that has been reconstructed, but is different in both age and development than ZT299.
- PA 868, a juvenile mandible of Lufengpithecus lufengensis, which was in process of sprouting its first molar, found in the Yunnan Province in southwestern China around the late 1950s.
- PA 869, a juvenile mandible of Lufengpithecus lufengensis discovered in 1980 in Shihuiba Village, Lufeng County, Yunnan Province in China.

== Anatomy ==
Using an equation derived by Conroy (1987) based on the mesiodistal length of preserved teeth found, it is estimated that Lufengpithecus had a body mass between 55.4 and 67.6 kg (122 and 149 lb).

Lufengpithecus possess prominent and rounded brow (supraorbital) ridges; in females the supraorbital ridges are predicted to be squarer. The brow ridges do not form a single bar. The midsagittal line of the face is also concave. The mandibular symphysis has a moderate superior transverse torus and prominent robust inferior torus. The orbits are approximately square in outline and the interorbital contains a wide region. The maximum height of the nasal opening is at the same level as the lower margins of the eye sockets.

The glabellar region which is located between the eyebrows and above the nose along with the frontal triangle are both very depressed. The midsagittal line of the face is also concave.

The orbits are approximately square in outline and the interorbital contains a wide region. The glabella appear to be broad and depressed. There is a superior margin of nasal aperture higher than inferior margin of orbits. The nasoalveolar clivus is also relatively short.

=== Dentition ===
Postcanine records show that Lufengpithecus was more dimorphic than all modern ape species. Due to the extremely high molar dimorphism, there is no overlap between male and female molar size. With respect to postcanines, Lufengpithecus has expanded the known range of sexual dimorphism. The molars have thick enamel, peripheralized cusp apices with expansive basin and a dense, complex pattern of occlusal crenulations. The pattern of compactness of the small transverse ridges in the enamel of permanent teeth of L. lufengensis are very similar to that of modern humans. The first upper incisors are high-crowned and proportionally thick (labiolingual length) compared to their breadth (mesiodistal length), with a distinct, high relief median lingual pillar. In contrast, the lower incisors are high crowned and relatively narrow mesiodistal and moderately procumbent. Male lower canines taper sharply toward the apex, and are relatively very high-crowned.

The age of molars in the assumed-female specimen PA868 was estimated 3.2-3.3 years, crown formation taking about 0.25-0.75 years, cspal enamel formation 0.4–1 years, and lateral enamel 686–1078 days. This is consistent with the growth rate of non-human great apes. She may have had gum disease.

== Diet ==
Lufengpithecus probably had a diet that consisted of both hard and soft fruits. It similarly developed molar shearing crests similar to other Miocene hominids such as Proconsul, Ouranopithecus, and Dendropithecus, indicating a general preference for harder fruits. Though, Lufengpithecus has smaller incisors indicating a preference for softer foods such as leaves or berries. Dental microwear of L. lufengensis teeth confirm that the species fed on tough leaves.

An alternative theory that was developed about L. lufengensis is that their diet was strictly leaves and berries. Research was done on a set of upper and lower molars and measurements of both the mesiodistal and buccolingual cusps were done and compared with other indigenous apes of the area in the time period. L. lufengensis's molars were much larger than all the other hominoids in size. The ratio of M1 to M3 shows a pattern and when there is a high M1 to M3 ratio it indicates a consumption of more fruits rather than leaves and berries. L. lufengensis's ratio was much lower than compared to the ratio of L. hudienensis. Due to the shearing crest size of the teeth that belongs to L. lufengensis researchers believe that the species' diet consisted primarily of leaves and berries. Because the enamel on the cusp of the molars is still relatively thick, this displays they were not worn down by tough foods. The crowns on their teeth tend to be less worn than those L. hudienensis.

== Paleoecology ==
Before Lufengpithecus evolved, the vegetation in the area was dominated by subtropical evergreen broad-leaved taxa with a few temperate deciduous taxa. During its time, the landscape changed and evergreen broad-leaved forests and grasses began to take over. The dominant species at the times were Quercus and Alnus. The vegetation was mostly angiosperms, followed by gymnosperms, and low-lying pteridophytes. Conifers began to decrease in this time, indicating a gradual warming of the climate. The greater diversity and warm humid climate during the late Miocene would have favored this ape's survival. Lake or wetland environments were also common, and it is postulated that Lufengpithecus lived in forests adjacent to open areas with grasses, which began expanding along with other C4 plants.

Other animals include elephants, the beaver Sinocastor, the rodent Kowalskia, the flying squirrel Pliopetaurista, the rabbit Alilepus, and the saber-toothed cat Longchuansmilus. Animals found near the fossil include tapirs, insectivores, flying squirrels, bamboo rats, freshwater birds, fish, frogs, turtles, crocodiles, beavers, otters and terrestrial birds, all which point to a swampy or lacustrine environment.

== Relation to other species ==
Fossils from the genus Lufengpithecus from the late Miocene are crucial in understanding hominoid evolution in Asia. The fossil being studied may be a member of the Homininae and a study wants to show an estimated age of molars in Lufengpithecus lufengensis at time of death. The results of the paper will help understand "Life History" in Miocene and Plio-Pleistocene hominids and great apes and humans. The author uses fossil PA868 as baseline and the fossil is thought to be a juvenile. They use the right mandibular of the fossil which has right four premolar and permanent first molar (M1)and also has five right permanent tooth crown germs which are I1, I2, C, P3, and P4 and the author concludes that PA868 was most likely a female. Age at time of death of PA868 was estimated using the number of perikymata on the surface of the cusp to the developing cervix. Age was 2.4-4.5 years based on the central incisor germ and 2.5-4.7 years based on the canine germ. The author discovers that first molar emergence was younger than the age of death due to the emergence of symptoms resembling gingivitis. The age of molars in the PA868 was estimated 3.2-3.3 years. The age of the crown formation took about 0.25-0.75 years for PA868. Cuspal enamel formed within 0.4–1 years. Lateral enamel formed in 686–1078 days. The age of first molar emergence for PA868 resembles that of extant great apes and is less in relation to modern humans. Lufengpithecus lufengensis is more similar to great apes and the hominoids and less related to monkeys and modern humans.

In the juvenile mandible of Lufengpithecus, the superior part of the anterior surface and the vertical implantation of the anterior teeth are a lot like the adults of the same species. Additionally, the juvenile and the adult species have these features in common with early Homo species and early great apes. The superior transverse torus is more prominent and developed in the adult species whereas the juvenile (PA869) has a less developed superior transverse torus. In the juvenile and the adult species the lateral prominences are separated into two branches which are only similar in a single orangutan species (based on the species discussed in the paper) and not related to humans. In the juvenile there are double mental foramina on the corpora whereas the adult species and every other species mentioned in the paper have single mental foramina. Results indicates that the corpus of juvenile mandible of Lufengpithecus possessed the basic structural framework of the adult mandible of same species and other species such as Sivapithecus, Australopithecus, early Homo, but possess a different framework from modern humans.

== See also ==
- Griphopithecus
- Meganthropus
