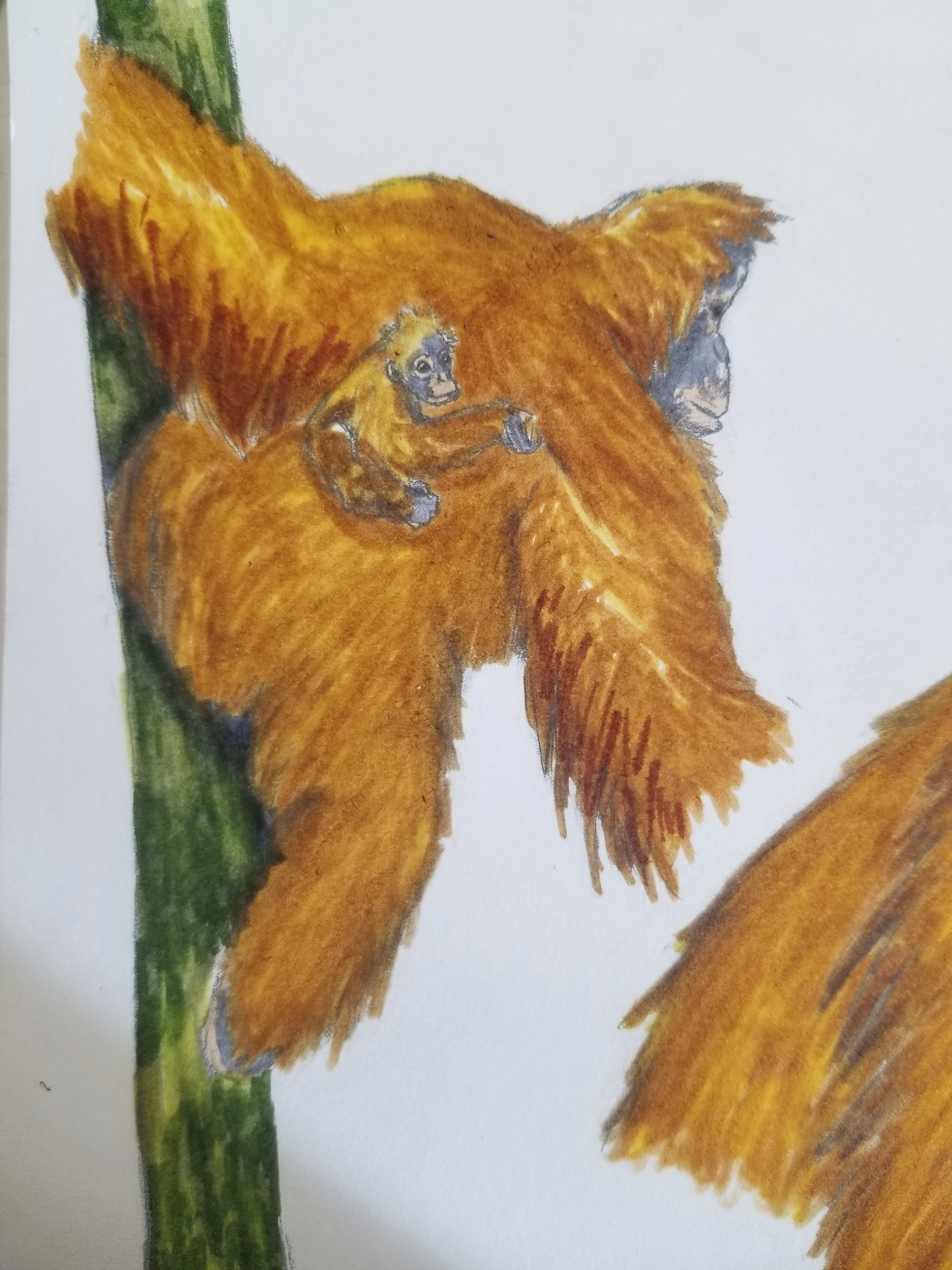
- Restoration of an adult female and infant

Scientific classification
- Kingdom: Animalia
- Phylum: Chordata
- Class: Mammalia
- Order: Primates
- Family: Hominidae
- Genus: Pongo
- Species: †P. hooijeri

Binomial name
- †Pongo hooijeri Schwartz et al., 1995

= Pongo hooijeri =

Pongo hooijeri Temporal range: Pleistocene

Extinct species of orangutan

Pongo hooijeri is an extinct species of orangutan from the Pleistocene of Vietnam. It was named in honor of paleontologist Dirk Albert Hooijer. Fossils of the ape were found in the Tham Hai Cave.

== Description ==
Pongo hooijeri is only known from isolated teeth. In its initial description, it was distinguished from other orangutan species by its generally larger tooth size than living orangutans, as well as a number of morphological characters of the teeth, differing from Pongo pygmaeus "in lacking significant crenelation on the occlusal surfaces of the molars and upper premolars, and on the basins of the lower premolars. Incisors are not known. Molar cusp disposition similar to that of P. pygmaeus, but the cusps themselves are puffier and more rounded occlusally as well as on their external slopes. The occlusal surfaces are thus more poorly defined, and the occlusal basins are more constricted."

== Taxonomy ==
Harrison et al. 2014 argued that the species should be considered a junior synonym of the more widespread extinct species Pongo weidenreichi.
