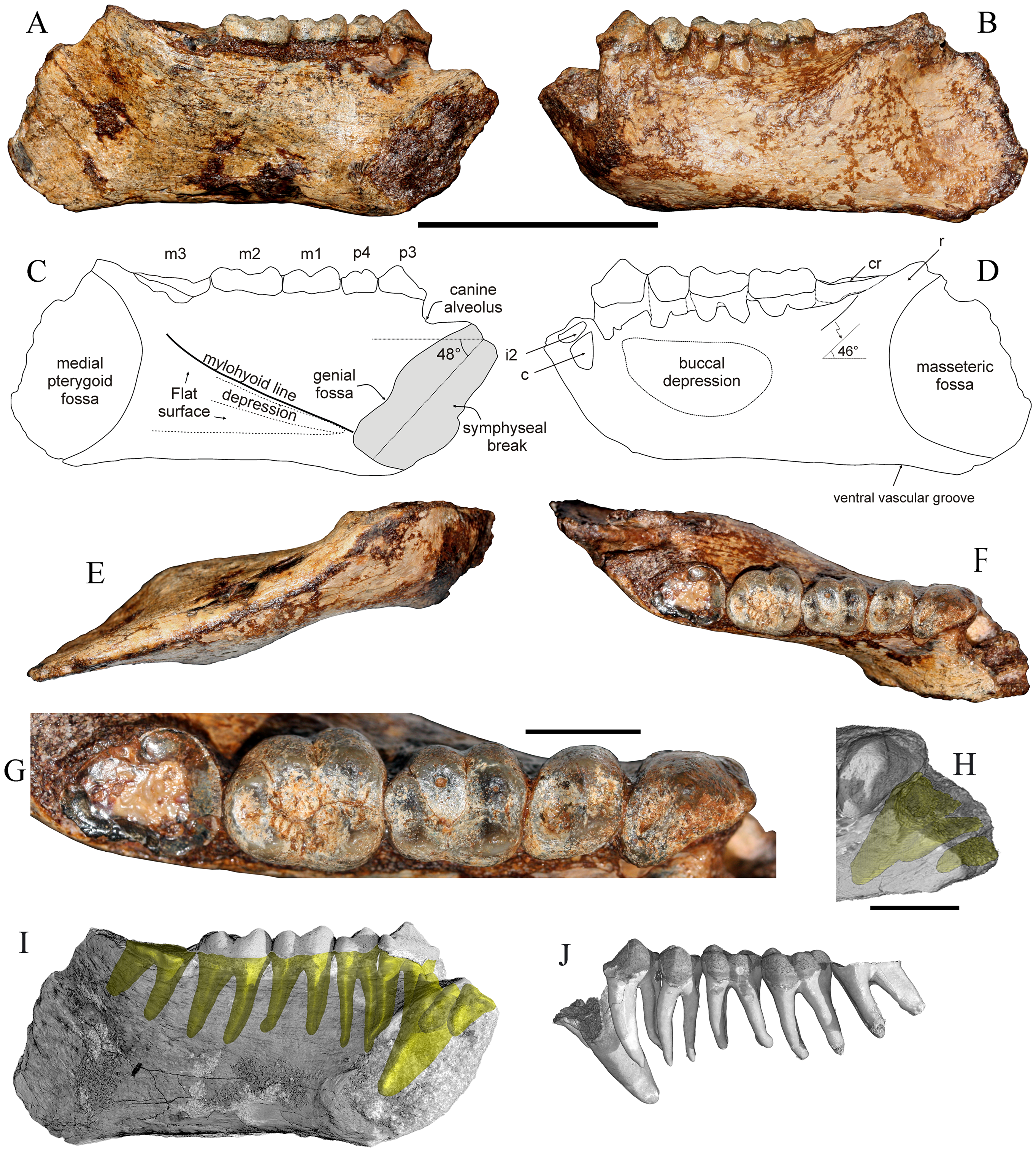
- Holotype mandible of Khoratpithecus ayeyarwadyensis from Myanmar

Scientific classification
- Kingdom: Animalia
- Phylum: Chordata
- Class: Mammalia
- Infraclass: Placentalia
- Order: Primates
- Superfamily: Hominoidea
- Family: Hominidae
- Subfamily: Ponginae
- Tribe: Pongini
- Genus: †Khoratpithecus; Chaimanee et al. 2004

Type species
- †Khoratpithecus piriyai Chaimanee et al. 2004

Species
- K. piriyai K. ayeyarwadyensis K. chiangmuanensis

= Khoratpithecus =

Khoratpithecus Temporal range: Late Miocene, ~9–7 Ma

Extinct genus of primates

Khoratpithecus is an extinct genus of pongin primates that lived during the Late Miocene (7–9 million years ago) in Myanmar and Thailand.

Three species belong to this genus:

- Khoratpithecus chiangmuanensis from Thailand (Chaimanee, Jolly, Benammi, Tafforeau, Duzer, Moussa & Jaeger, 2003) (formerly Lufengpithecus chiangmuanensis)
- Khoratpithecus piriyai from Thailand Chaimanee, Suteethorn, Jintasakul, Vidthayanon, Marandat & Jaeger, 2004
- Khoratpithecus ayeyarwadyensis from Myanmar Jaeger, Soe, Chavasseau, Coster, Emonet, Guy, Lebrun, Maung, Shwe, Tun, Oo, Rugbumrung, Bocherens, Benammi, Chaivanich, Tafforeau & Chaimanee, 2011

== Palaeobiology ==
Stable isotopic analysis consisting of paired δ^{13}C and δ^{18}O measurements shows that K. ayeyarwadyensis inhabited the treetops of highly forested habitats and fed exclusively on C_{3} vegetation. Dental microwear and dental topography both indicate that Khoratpithecus was frugivorous, preferring soft fruits over seeds and hard fruits.

== See also ==
- Lufengpithecus
- Griphopithecus
- Sivapithecus
