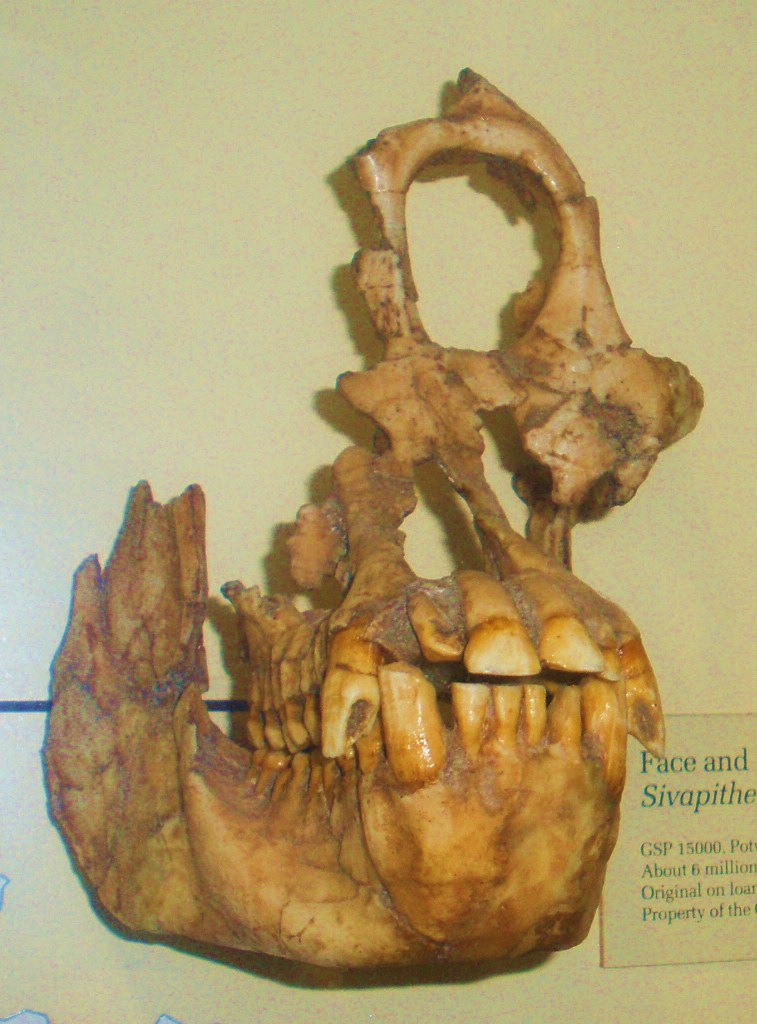
- S. indicus GSP 15000, on loan at the Natural History Museum, London

Scientific classification
- Kingdom: Animalia
- Phylum: Chordata
- Class: Mammalia
- Order: Primates
- Superfamily: Hominoidea
- Family: Hominidae
- Subfamily: Ponginae
- Tribe: †Sivapithecini
- Genus: †Sivapithecus; Pilgrim, 1910

Species
- S. sivalensis; S. parvada; S. indicus; S. hysudricus

Synonyms
- Brahmapithecus; Ramapithecus; Palaeopithecus sivalensis

= Sivapithecus =

Sivapithecus Temporal range: 12.5–8.5 Ma

Genus of extinct Asian ape

Sivapithecus (lit. 'Shiva's Ape') (syn: Ramapithecus) is a genus of extinct apes. Fossil remains of animals now assigned to this genus, dated from 12.2 million years old in the Miocene, have been found since the 19th century in the Sivalik Hills of the Indian subcontinent as well as in Kutch. Any one of the species in this genus may have been the ancestor to the modern orangutans.

Some early discoveries were given the separate names Ramapithecus (Rama's Ape) and Bramapithecus (Brahma's Ape), and were thought to be possible ancestors of humans.

== Discovery ==
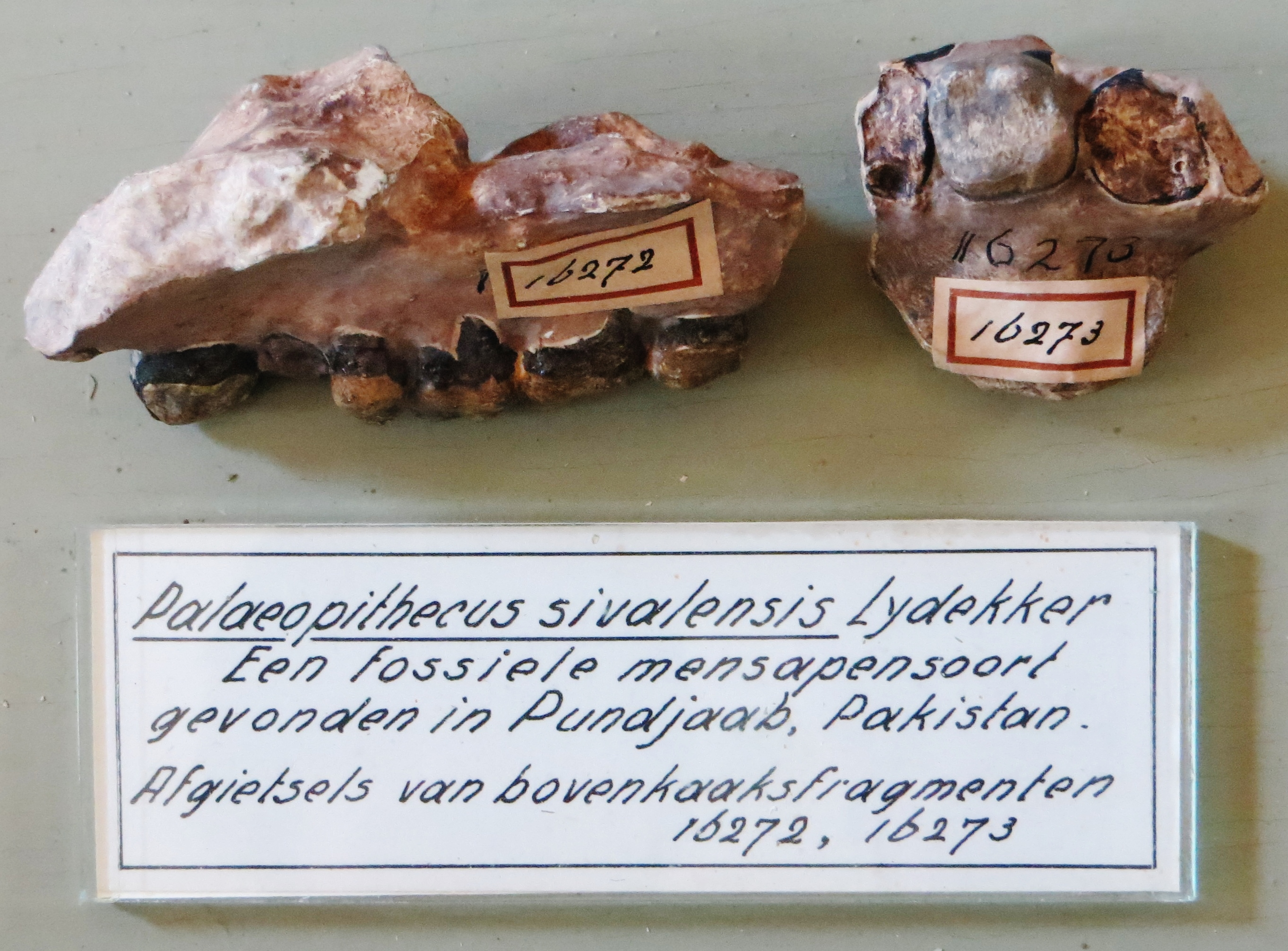
Jaw fragments of S. sivalensis.

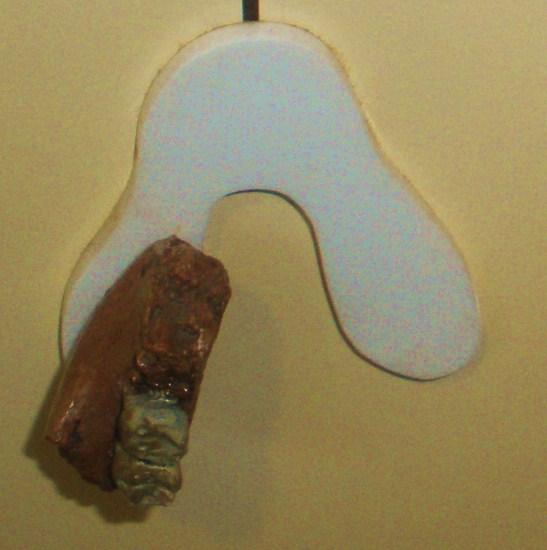
S. punjabicus jaw

The first incomplete specimens of Sivapithecus were found in northern India in the late 19th century.

Another find was made in Nepal on the bank of the Tinau River situated in Palpa District; a western part of the country in 1932. This find was named "Ramapithecus". The discoverer, G. Edward Lewis, claimed that it was distinct from Sivapithecus, as the jaw was more like a human's than any other fossil ape then known, a claim revived in the 1960s. At that time, it was believed that the ancestors of humans had diverged from other apes 14 million years ago. Biochemical studies upset this view, suggesting that there was an early split between orangutan ancestors and the common ancestors of chimpanzees, gorillas and humans.

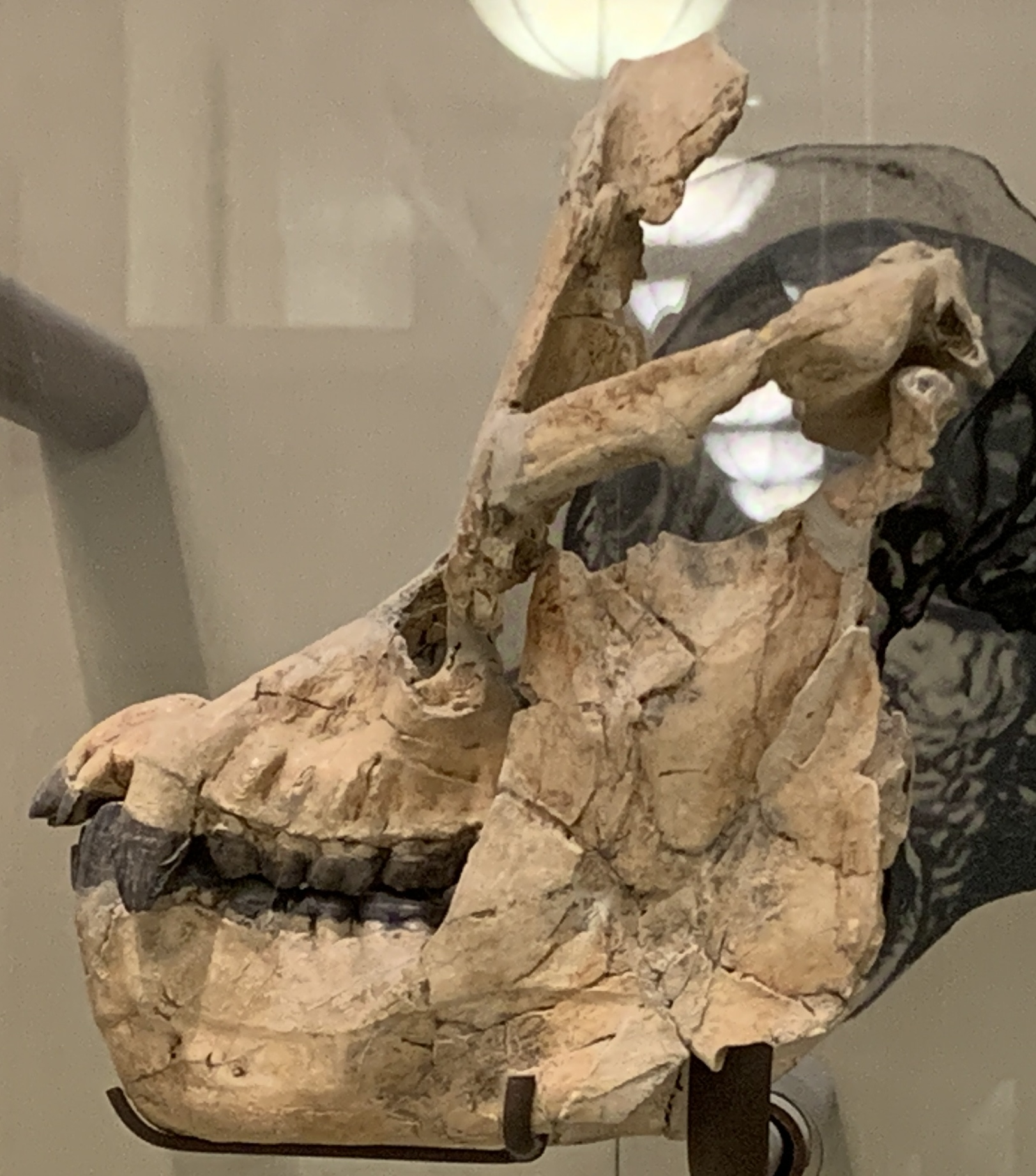
S. indicus skull cast of GSP 15000. At the AMNH.

Meanwhile, more complete specimens of Ramapithecus were found in 1975 and 1976, which showed that it was less human-like than had been thought. It began to look more and more like Sivapithecus, meaning that the older name must take priority. It is also possible that fossils assigned to Ramapithecus belonged to the female form of Sivapithecus. They were definitely members of the same genus. It is also likely that they were already separate from the common ancestor of chimpanzees, gorillas and humans, which may be represented by the prehistoric great ape Nakalipithecus nakayamai. Siwalik specimens once assigned to the genus Ramapithecus are now considered by most researchers to belong to one or more species of Sivapithecus. Ramapithecus is no longer regarded as a likely ancestor of humans.

In 1982, David Pilbeam published a description of a significant fossil find from Potwar Plateau, Pakistan, formed by a large part of the face and jaw of a Sivapithecus. The partial skull was likely scavenged after death. The specimen (GSP 15000) bore many similarities to the orangutan skull and strengthened the theory (previously suggested by others) that Sivapithecus was closely related to orangutans.

In 2011, a 10.8 million-year old (Neogene period) upper jawbone of Sivapithecus was found in Kutch district of Gujarat, India. The find also extended Sivapithecus' southern range in Indian subcontinent significantly. The species can not be identified.

== Description ==
Sivapithecus was about 1.5 metres (5 ft) in body length, similar in size to a modern orangutan. In most respects, it would have resembled a chimpanzee, but its face was closer to that of an orangutan. The shape of its wrists and general body proportions suggest that it spent a significant amount of its time on the ground, as well as in trees. It had large canine teeth, and heavy molars, suggesting a diet of relatively tough food, such as seeds and savannah grasses.

Similarities to orangutans in what are chiefly jaw and partial skull fossils are a concave face with large zygomatic arch bones, narrow setting of eyes from each other, smoothness of nasal floor, and central incisor enlargement. However Sivapithecus' "dental characteristics and postcranial skeleton do not confirm this phylogenetic position" say Yaowalak Chaimanee of the Paleontology section of Thailand's Department of Mineral Resources and colleagues, while reporting a find in 2003, so neat affinities are not the state of finding to date.

== Species ==
Currently three species are generally recognized:

- Sivapithecus indicus fossils date from about 12.5 million to 10.5 million years ago.
- Sivapithecus sivalensis lived from 9.5 million to 8.5 million years ago. It was found at the Pothwar plateau in Pakistan as well as in parts of India. The animal was about the size of a chimpanzee but had the facial morphology of an orangutan; it ate soft fruit (detected in the toothwear pattern) and was probably mainly arboreal.
- Sivapithecus parvada described in 1988, this species is significantly larger and dated to about 10 million years ago.

== See also ==
- Ankarapithecus
- Griphopithecus
- History of hominoid taxonomy
- Human evolutionary genetics
- Khoratpithecus
- Lufengpithecus
