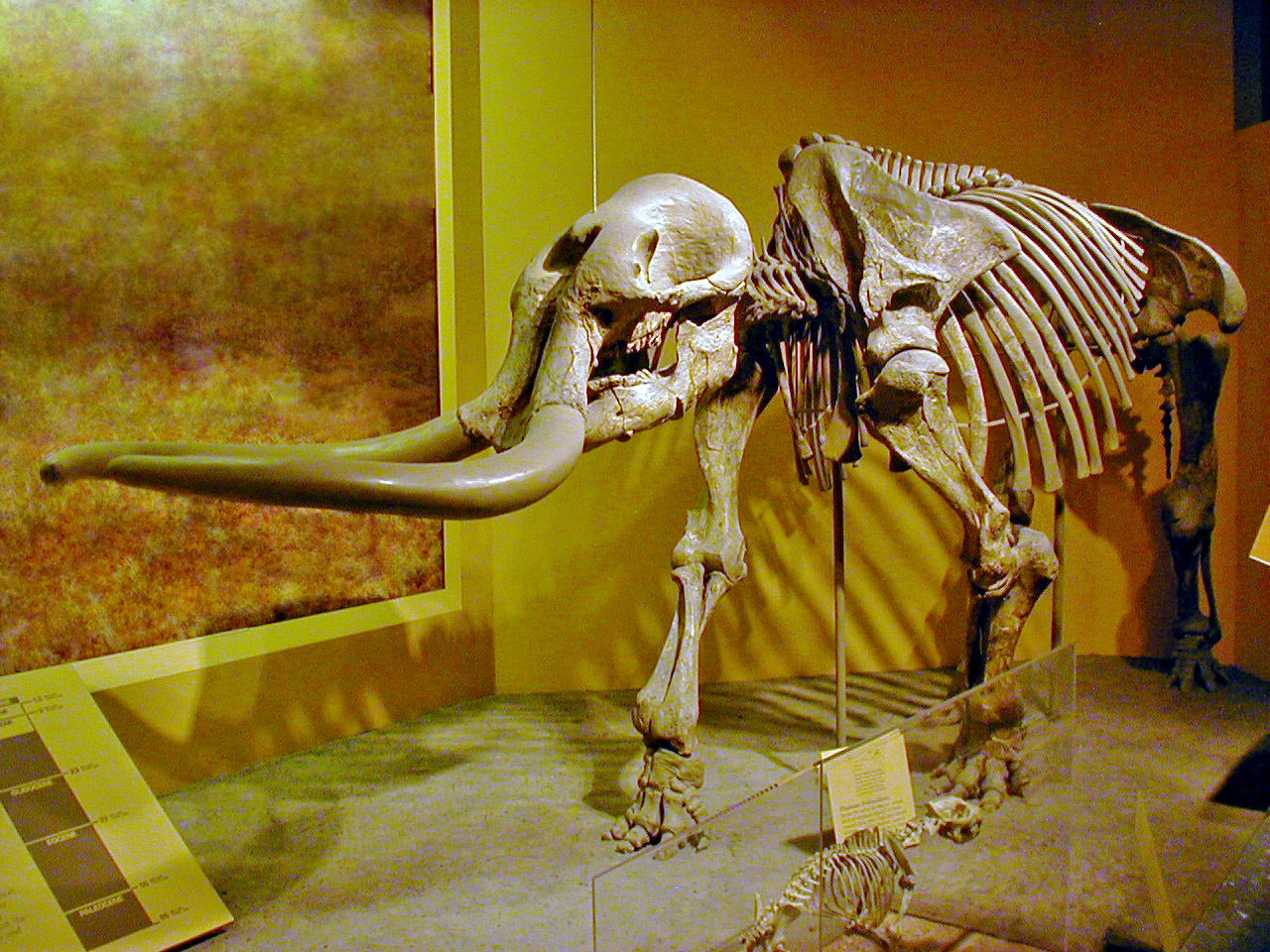
- S. mirificus fossil at the Smithsonian Natural History Museum

Scientific classification
- Kingdom: Animalia
- Phylum: Chordata
- Class: Mammalia
- Infraclass: Placentalia
- Order: Proboscidea
- Family: †Gomphotheriidae
- Genus: †Stegomastodon; Pohlig, 1912

Species
- †S. aftoniae; †S. mirificus; †S. nebrascensis; †S. primitivus

Synonyms
- Morrillia

= Stegomastodon =

Stegomastodon Temporal range: ~3.58–1.07 Ma Blancan - Early Irvingtonian

Extinct genus of mammals

Stegomastodon ('roof breast tooth') is an extinct genus of gomphotheres. It ranged throughout North America from the Pliocene (early Blancan ~3.58 Ma), to the Early Pleistocene (early Irvingtonian, ~1.07 Ma). The former South American species have been synonymized with Notiomastodon platensis.

== Description ==
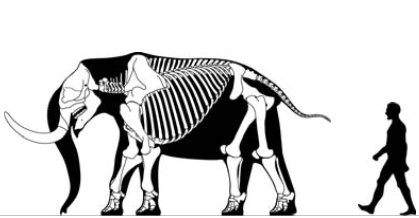
Skeleton of Stegomastodon compared with a human

Stegomastodon mirificus is known from NMNH 10707, a roughly 30-year-old male, of which most of the skeleton has been found. Alive, it stood about 2.6 m (8.5 ft) tall, with a weight around 4.7 tonnes (4.6 long tons; 5.2 short tons). Unlike more primitive gomphotheres like Gomphotherium, it lacked lower tusks and had a shortened lower jaw. The upper tusks curved upward and were about 3.5 m (11.5 ft) long, and lacked enamel bands. The tall head and robust lower jaw suggest a strong vertical bite. Stegomastodon's third molars had at least 5 lophs (ridge-like structures), greater than previous gomphotheres. The strong bite and increased tooth complexity are suggested to be adaptations to a grazing diet. The neologism 'cornady' (pl. cornadies) has been proposed in some literature as an English name for the members of this genus.

== Origin and evolution ==
Stegomastodon is suggested to have ultimately originated from New World populations of Gomphotherium, possibly via the intermediate genus Rhynchotherium. The earliest species of the genus appeared during the Pliocene (Blancan) around 3-4 million years ago. During the early Irvingtonian, around 1.07 million years ago, Stegomastodon became extinct, which is suggested to be due to competition with the recently arrived mammoths, which were more efficient grazers. Originally, some specimens from Jalisco, Mexico were estimated to date to 28,000 years Before Present, but this age was rejected in 2011 by Spencer G. Lucas et al., who stated that the date was far too young to be viable and that it actually dates to the Blancan.

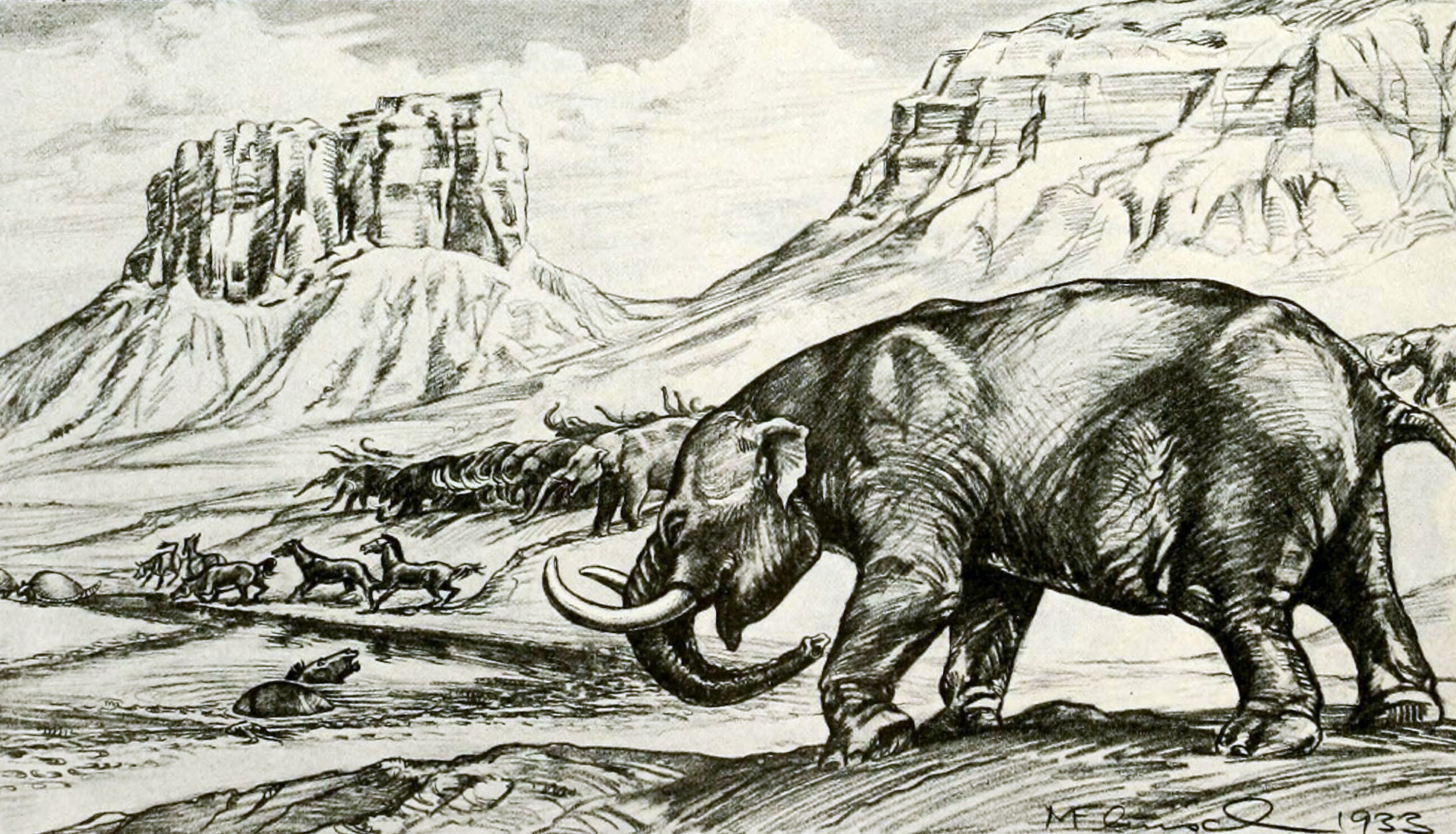
Restoration of an S. mirificus herd

== Taxonomy ==
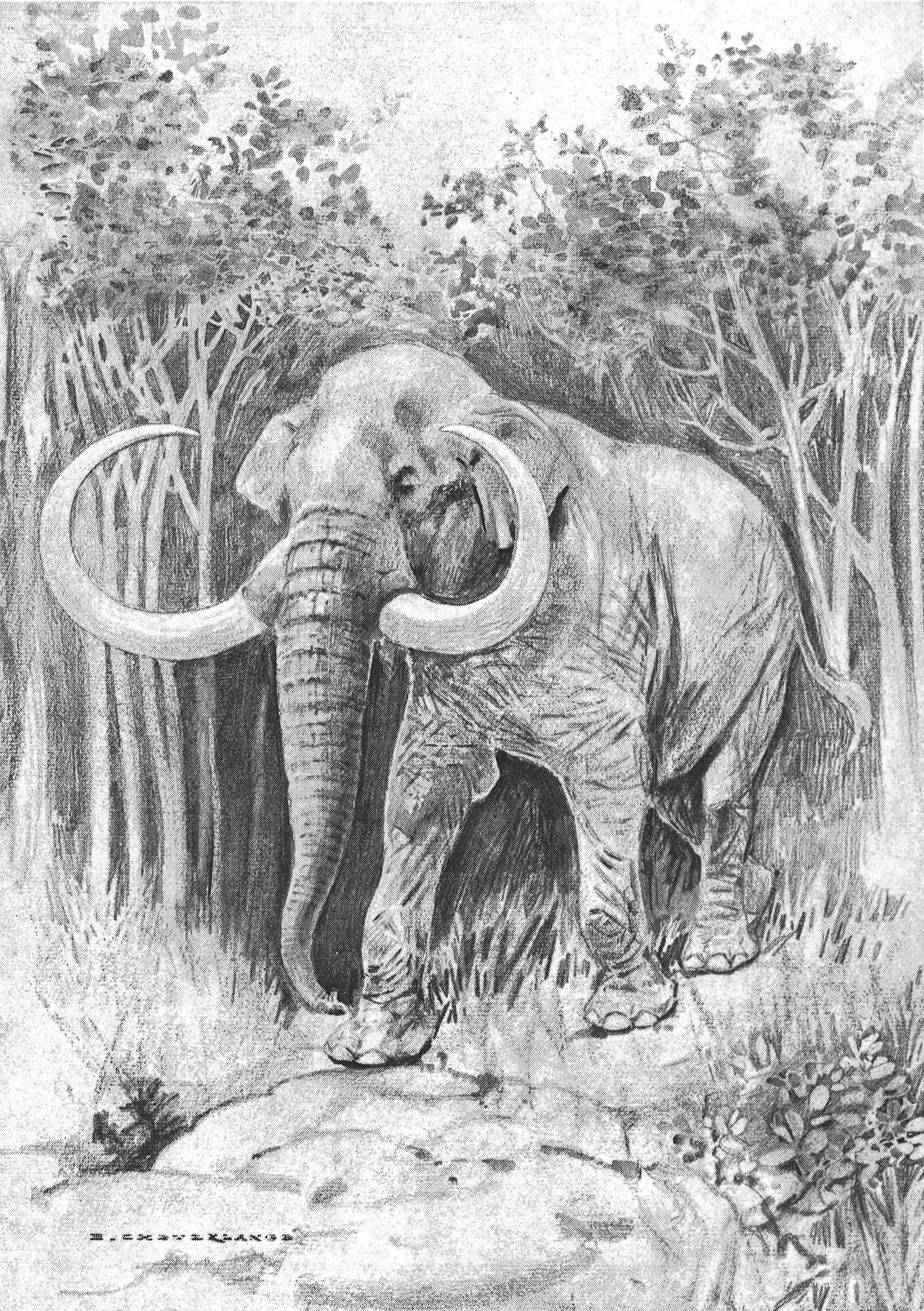
Restoration of S. mirificus

The number of species within the genus has varied between S. mirificus being the only valid species, to Osborn's seven species of “ascending mutations” (S. primitivus, S. successor, S. mirificus, S. chapmani, S. texanus, S. arizonae and S. aftoniae) Lucas et al., 2013 accepted three overlapping chronospecies: S. primitivus, S. mirificus S. aftoniae. The South American Stegomastodon fossils have been reassigned to Notiomastodon by the majority of recent authors. Stegomastodon and Notiomastodon differ in numerous characters, including of the skull and limbs. Revised taxonomy of Stegomastodon and other trilophodont gomphotheres according to Mothé et al., 2017:

- †Gomphotheriidae (Gomphotheres)
  - †Gomphotherium
  - - †Gnathabelodon
    - - †Eubelodon
      - Brevirostrine clade
        - †Stegomastodon
        - - †Sinomastodon
          - - †Notiomastodon
            - - †Rhynchotherium
              - †Cuvieronius
