= El Fin del Mundo =

Ancient Pleistocene site near Pitiquito in northwestern Sonora, Mexico

El Fin del Mundo (Spanish: 'End of the World') is an ancient Pleistocene site near Pitiquito in northwestern Sonora, Mexico. It features Clovis culture period occupation proposed to date to 13,390 calibrated years Before Present, though this is contested.

El Fin del Mundo is suggested to be one of the oldest Clovis sites in North America, roughly similar chronologically to the Aubrey site in Denton County, Texas, which produced a radiocarbon date that is almost identical.

== Clovis hunters ==
In 2011, remains of the gomphothere (elephant relative) Cuvieronius dating around 13,390 calibrated years BP were found. This was the first such association found in a northern part of the continent where gomphotheres had been thought to have gone extinct 30,000 years ago. In July 2014, it was announced that the "position and proximity of Clovis weapon fragments relative to the gomphothere bones at the site suggest that humans did in fact kill the two animals there. Of the seven Clovis points found at the site, four were in place among the bones, including one with bone and teeth fragments above and below. The other three points had clearly eroded away from the bone bed and were found scattered nearby." However, a later study considered the dating of both El Fin del Mundo and Aubrey unreliable, so the sites may be younger.

Bones of horse and bison, as well as horse teeth, were also found at the site.

== See also ==
- Paleo-Indians

== Bibliography ==
- Ferring, C. Reid (2001) The Archaeology and Paleoecology of the Aubrey Clovis Site (41DN479) Denton County, Texas. (Center for Environmental Archaeology, Dept. of Geography, Univ. of North Texas, Denton
- Holliday, Vance, Guadalupe Sánchez, and Ismael Sánchez-Morales, eds, "El Fin Del Mundo: A Clovis Site in Sonora, Mexico Volume 84", Vol. 84., University of Arizona Press, 2024
- Sanchez, Guadalupe, Vance T. Holliday, Edmund P. Gaines, Joaquín Arroyo-Cabrales, Natalia Martínez-Tagüeña, Andrew Kowler, Todd Lange, Gregory W. L. Hodgins, Susan M. Mentzer, and Ismael Sanchez- Morales. Human (Clovis)gomphothere (Cuvieronius sp.) association ~13,390 calibrated yr BP in Sonora, Mexico. Proceedings of the National Academy of Sciences, 111: 10972-10977 doi:10.1073/pnas.1404546111
