= Irvingtonian =

North American faunal stage according to the North American Land Mammal Ages chronology

The Irvingtonian North American Land Mammal Age on the geologic timescale is the North American faunal stage according to the North American Land Mammal Ages chronology (NALMA), spanning from 1.8 million – 250,000 years BP. Named after an assemblage of fossils from the Irvington District of Fremont, California, the Irvingtonian is usually considered to overlap the Lower Pleistocene and Middle Pleistocene epochs. The Irvingtonian is preceded by the Blancan and followed by the Rancholabrean NALMA stages.

The Irvingtonian can be further divided into substages:

- Irvingtonian I - approximately 1.9 MA TO 0.85 MA
- Irvingtonian II - approximately 0.85 MA TO 0.4 MA
- Irvingtonian III - approximately 0.4 MA TO 0.25 MA

The beginning of the Irvingtonian is defined by the first appearance of Mammuthus south of 55° N in North America, and the beginning of the succeeding Rancholabrean is defined by the first appearance of Bison.

In South America, it chronologically overlaps with the Ensenadan and early Lujanian in South American Land Mammal Ages.

== Fauna ==
=== Notable mammals ===
Artiodactyla - even-toed ungulates

- Platygonus, peccaries
- Titanotylopus, camels

Carnivora - carnivores

- Borophagus, bone-crushing dogs
- Canis, wolves
- Chasmaporthetes, hyenas
- Machairodontinae, saber-toothed cats
- Lynx, lynxes, bobcats
- Ursus, bears

Lagomorpha - lagomorphs

- Hypolagus, rabbits

Perissodactyla - odd-toed ungulates

- Nannippus, horses
- Plesippus, horses - may belong in Equus

Proboscidea - elephants

- Elephantidae, mammoths
- Mammutidae, mastodons
- Rhynchotherium, gomphotheres
- Stegomastodon, gomphotheres
- Cuvieronius , gomphotheres

Rodentia - rodents

- Paenemarmota, giant marmots

=== Notable birds ===
Charadriiformes

- unknown scolopacid (archaic calidrid or turnstone?)

Falconiformes - diurnal raptors

- Falco sp., a falcon

Passeriformes

- unknown corvid (archaic magpie?)
