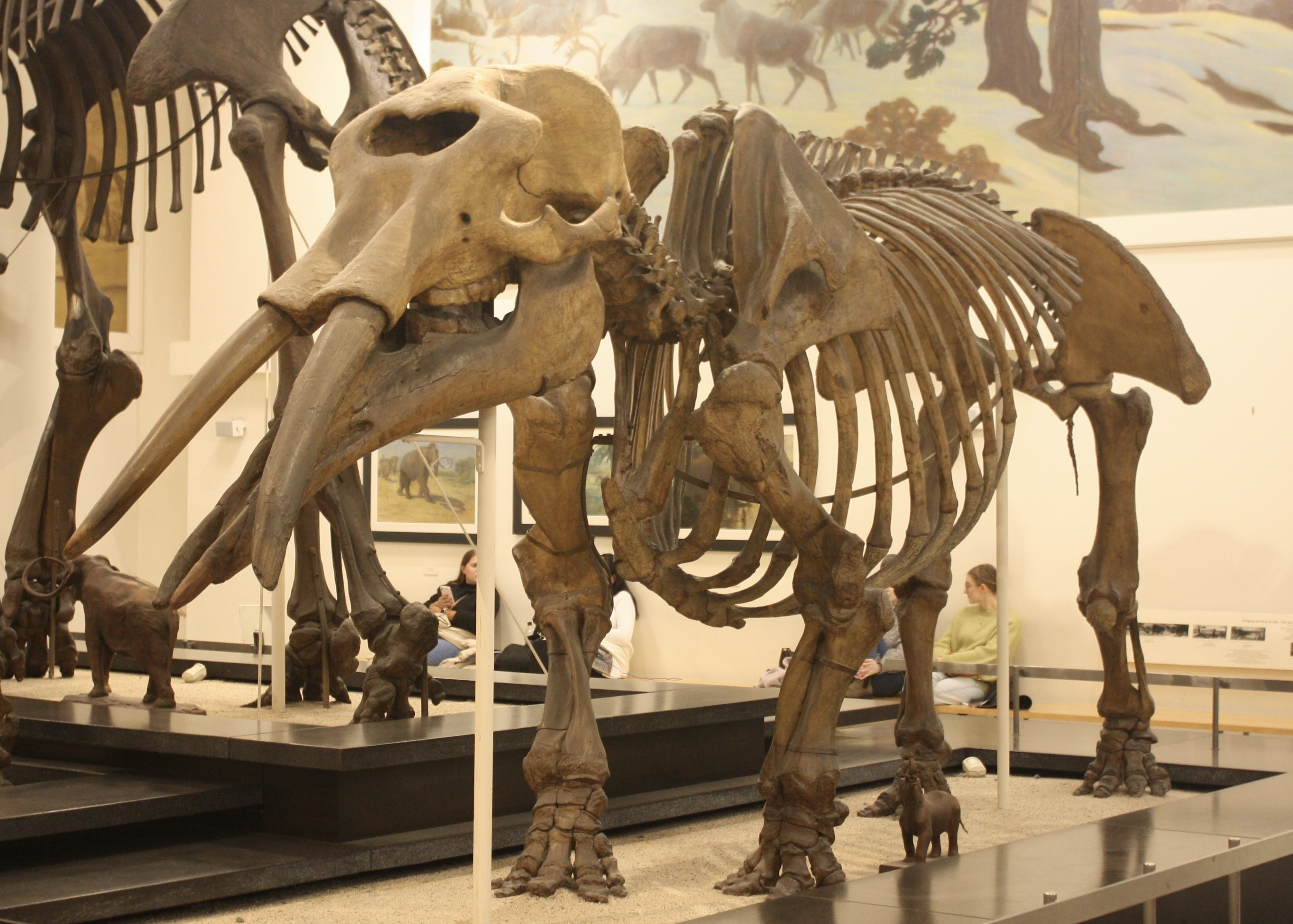
- Specimen of Gomphotherium productum at the American Museum of Natural History
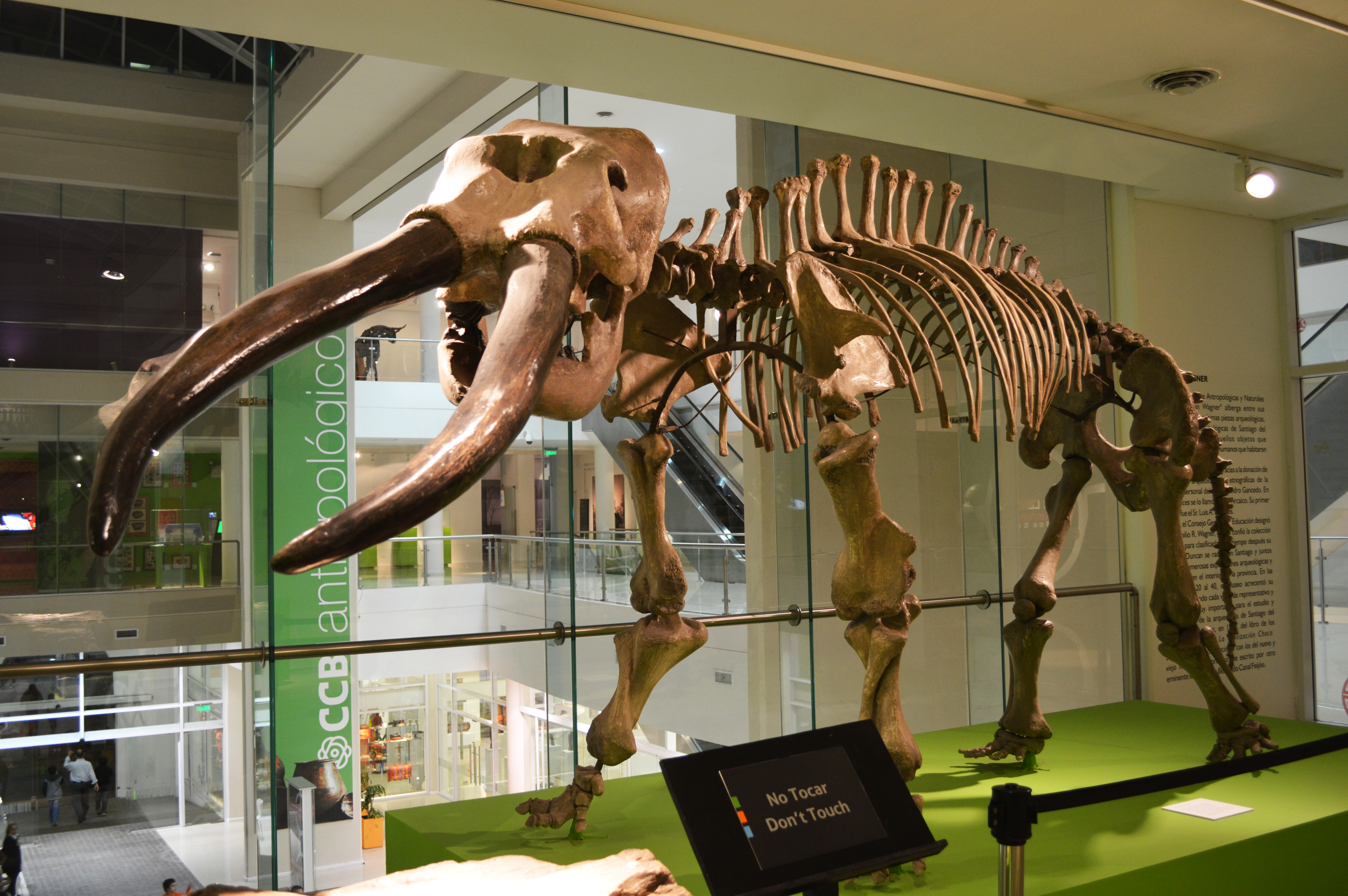
- Notiomastodon platensis Centro Cultural del Bicentenario de Santiago del Estero in Argentina

Scientific classification
- Kingdom: Animalia
- Phylum: Chordata
- Class: Mammalia
- Order: Proboscidea
- Clade: Elephantimorpha
- Clade: Elephantida
- Superfamily: †Gomphotherioidea
- Family: †Gomphotheriidae (Hay, 1922) A. Cabrera 1929

Genera
- "Trilophodont gomphotheres"; †Blancotherium; †Cuvieronius; †Eubelodon?; †Gnathabelodon?; †Gomphotherium; †Megabelodon?; †Notiomastodon; †Rhynchotherium; †Sinomastodon; †Stegomastodon; † Amebelodontinae?; † Choerolophodontinae?; "Tetralophodont gomphotheres"; †Anancus; †Chesalophodon?; †Konobelodon?; †Paratetralophodon; †Pediolophodon?; †Tetralophodon

= Gomphothere =

Gomphotheres Temporal range: 28–0.01 Ma Early Oligocene - Early Holocene Descendant taxon Elephantidae survives to present

Extinct family of proboscidean mammals

Gomphotheres are an extinct group of proboscideans related to modern elephants. First appearing in Africa during the Oligocene, they dispersed into Eurasia and North America during the Miocene and arrived in South America during the Pleistocene as part of the Great American Interchange. Gomphotheres are a paraphyletic group ancestral to Elephantidae, which contains modern elephants, as well as Stegodontidae.

While the most well-known forms like Gomphotherium had long lower jaws with tusks, the ancestral condition for the group, some later members developed shortened (brevirostrine) lower jaws with either vestigial or no lower tusks, which survived considerably later than the long-jawed gomphotheres. This change made them look very similar to modern elephants, an example of parallel evolution. During the Pliocene and Early Pleistocene, the diversity of gomphotheres declined, ultimately becoming extinct outside of the Americas. The last two genera, Cuvieronius ranging from southern North America to northwestern South America, and Notiomastodon, ranging over most of South America, continued to exist until the end of the Pleistocene around 12,000 years ago, when they became extinct along with most other American megafauna species following the arrival of humans.

The name "gomphothere" comes from Ancient Greek γόμφος (gómphos), "peg, pin; wedge; joint" plus θηρίον (theríon), "beast".

== Description ==
Gomphotheres differed from elephants in their tooth structure, particularly the chewing surfaces on the molar teeth. The teeth are considered to be bunodont, that is, having rounded rather than sharp cusps. They are thought to have typically chewed differently from modern elephants, using an oblique movement (combining back to front and side to side motion) over the teeth rather than the proal movement (a forwards stroke from the back to the front of the lower jaws) used by modern elephants and stegodontids, with this oblique movement being combined with vertical (orthal) motion that served to crush food. Like modern elephants and other members of Elephantimorpha, gomphotheres had horizontal tooth replacement, where teeth would progressively migrate towards the front of the jaws before they were taken place by more posterior teeth. Unlike modern elephants, many gomphotheres retained permanent premolar teeth though they were absent in some gomphothere genera.

Comparison of teeth and lower jaws
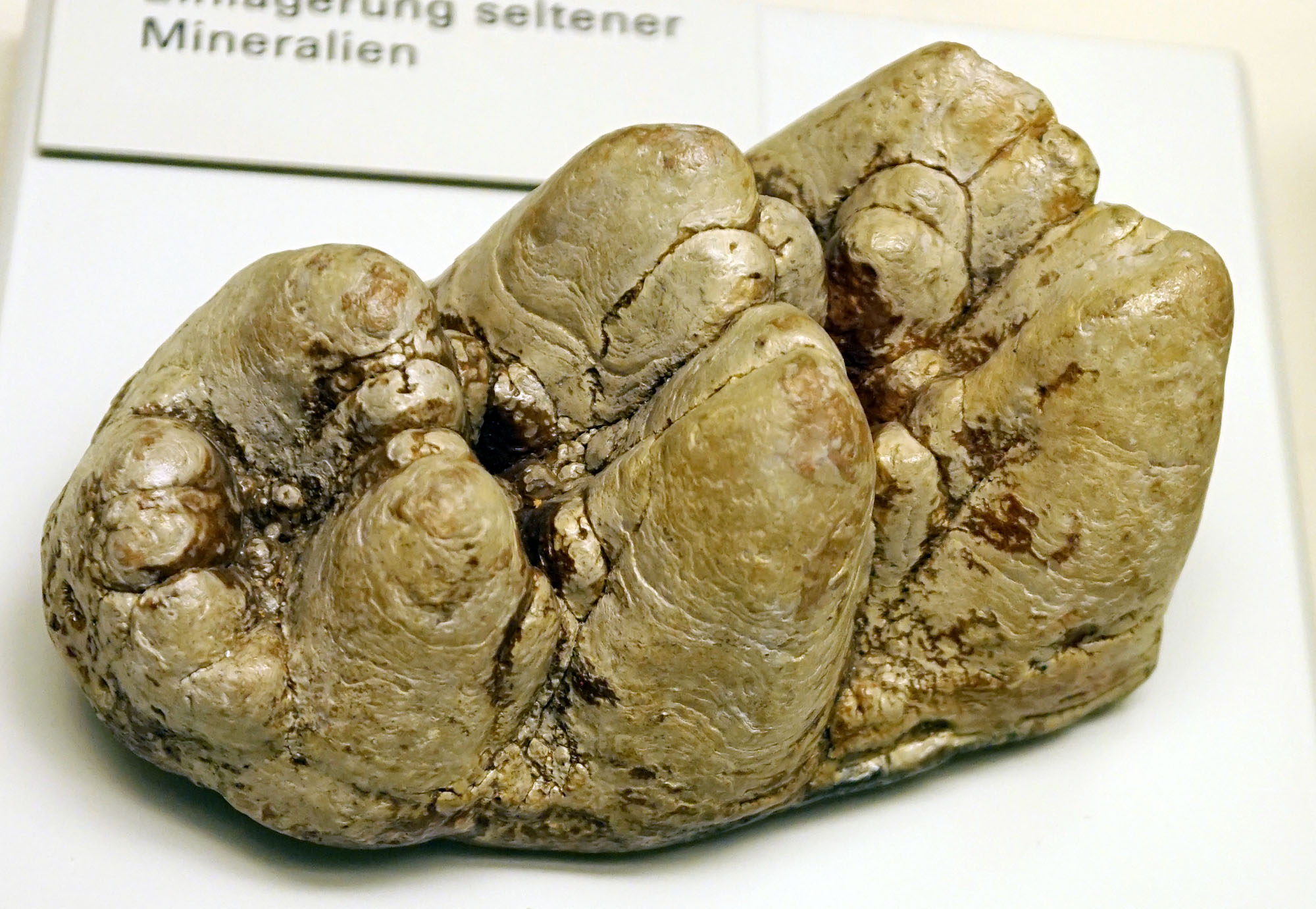
Largely unworn molar of Gomphotherium angustidens, a "trilophodont gomphothere"

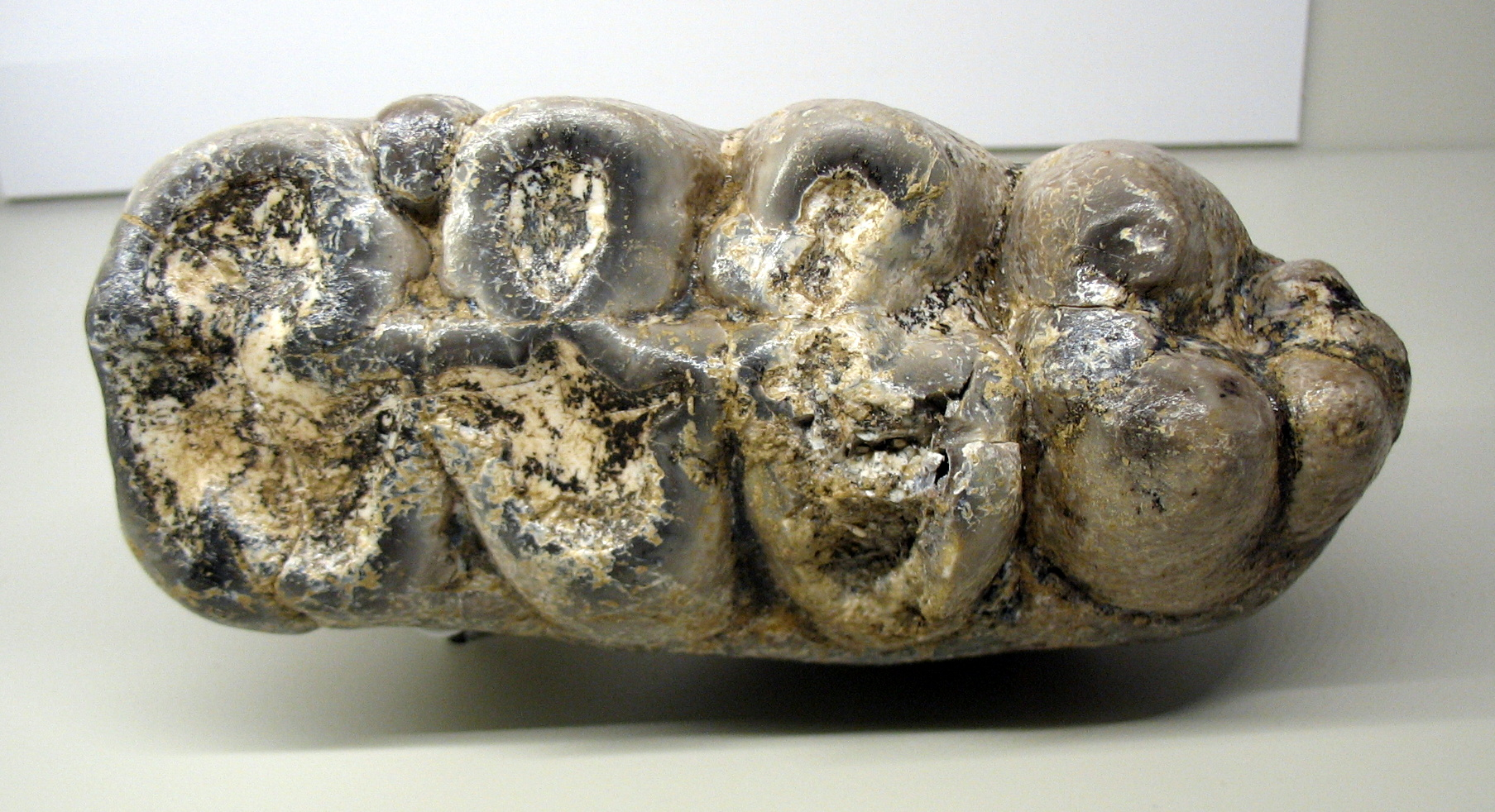
Worn molar of Gomphotherium angustidens

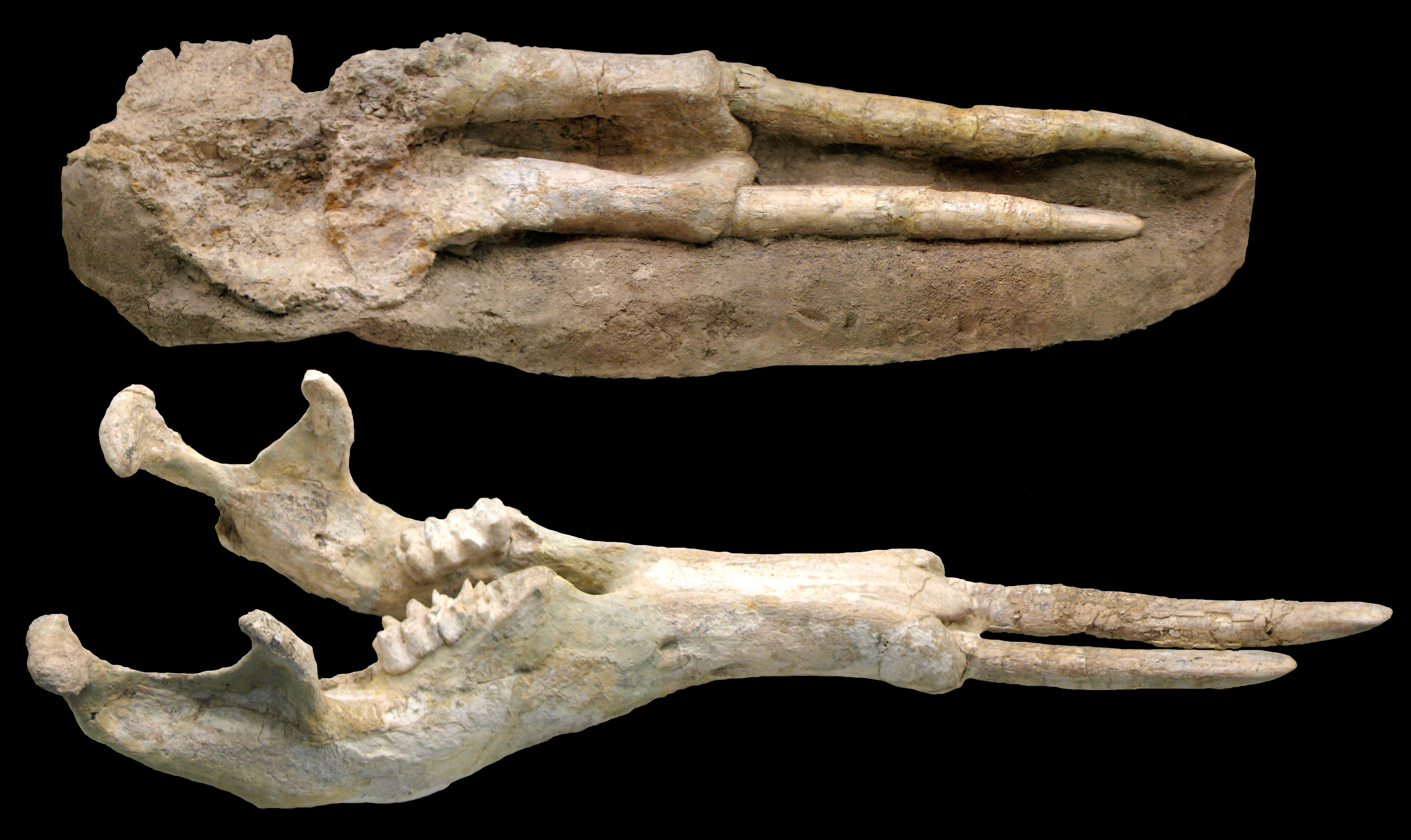
Lower jaw of Tetralophodon longirostris (bottom) showing elongate and robust mandibular symphysis and elongate lower tusks at its apex

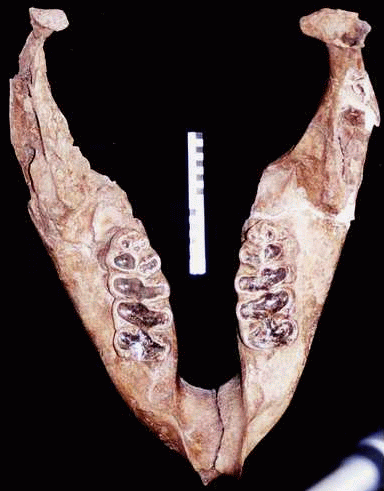
Shortened (brevirostrine) and tuskless lower jaw of Cuvieronius hyodon

Early gomphotheres had lower jaws with an elongate (longirostrine) mandibular symphysis (the fused front-most part of the lower jaw) and lower tusks, the primitive condition for members of Elephantimorpha. Later members developed shortened (brevirostrine) lower jaws and/or vestigial or no lower tusks, a convergent process that occurred multiple times among gomphotheres, as well as other members of Elephantimorpha. In Gomphotheriidae, these elongate mandibular symphysis tend to be narrow, while the lower tusks tend to be club-shaped. While the musculature of the trunk of longirostrine gomphotheres was likely very similar to that of living elephants, the trunk was likely shorter (probably no longer than the tips of the lower tusks), and rested upon the elongate lower jaw, though the trunks of later brevirostrine gomphotheres were likely free hanging and comparable to those of living elephants in length.

The upper tusks of primitive longirostrine gomphotheres typically gently curve downwards, and generally do not exceed 2 metres (6.6 ft) in length nor were heavier than 35 kilograms (77 lb) in life, though some later brevirostine gomphotheres developed considerably larger upper tusks. Upper tusks of brevirostine gomphotheres include those which are straight and upwardly curved. As is ancestral for elephantimorphs, many gomphotheres had a band of enamel running along the entire length of the lateral (facing outwards to the side of the animal) surface of the upper tusks from the tip to the root (or alternatively spiraling along the whole length if the tusk was twisted as in some gomphotheres), which was otherwise largely made of dentine like modern elephants. Another lateral enamel band is also present in the lower tusks. Such a feature is found in the tusks of early juvenile living elephants but is quickly lost and is not present in adults. Some gomphothere genera convergently lost the tusk enamel band in adults like living elephants.

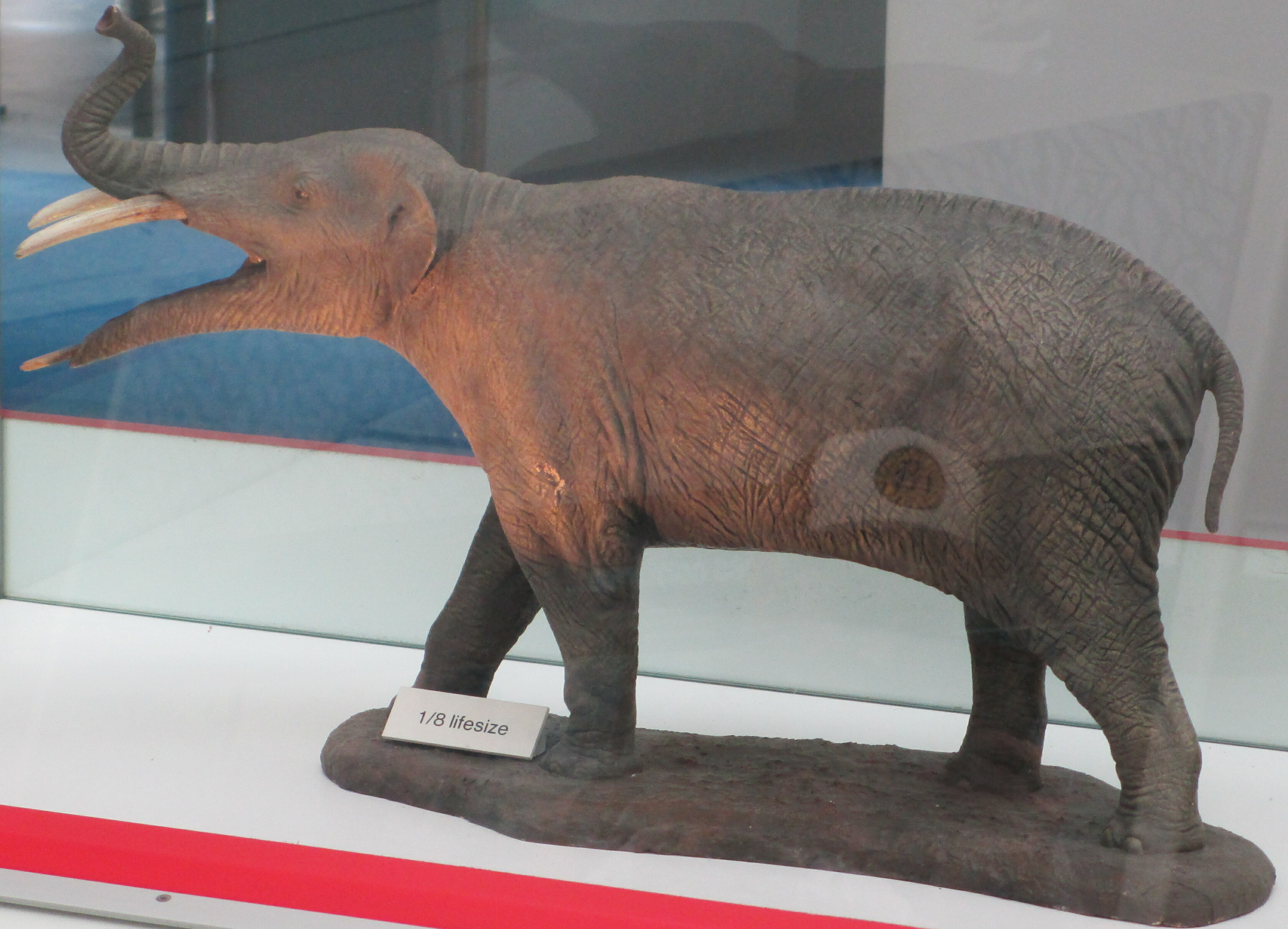
Miniature model restoration of Gomphotherium

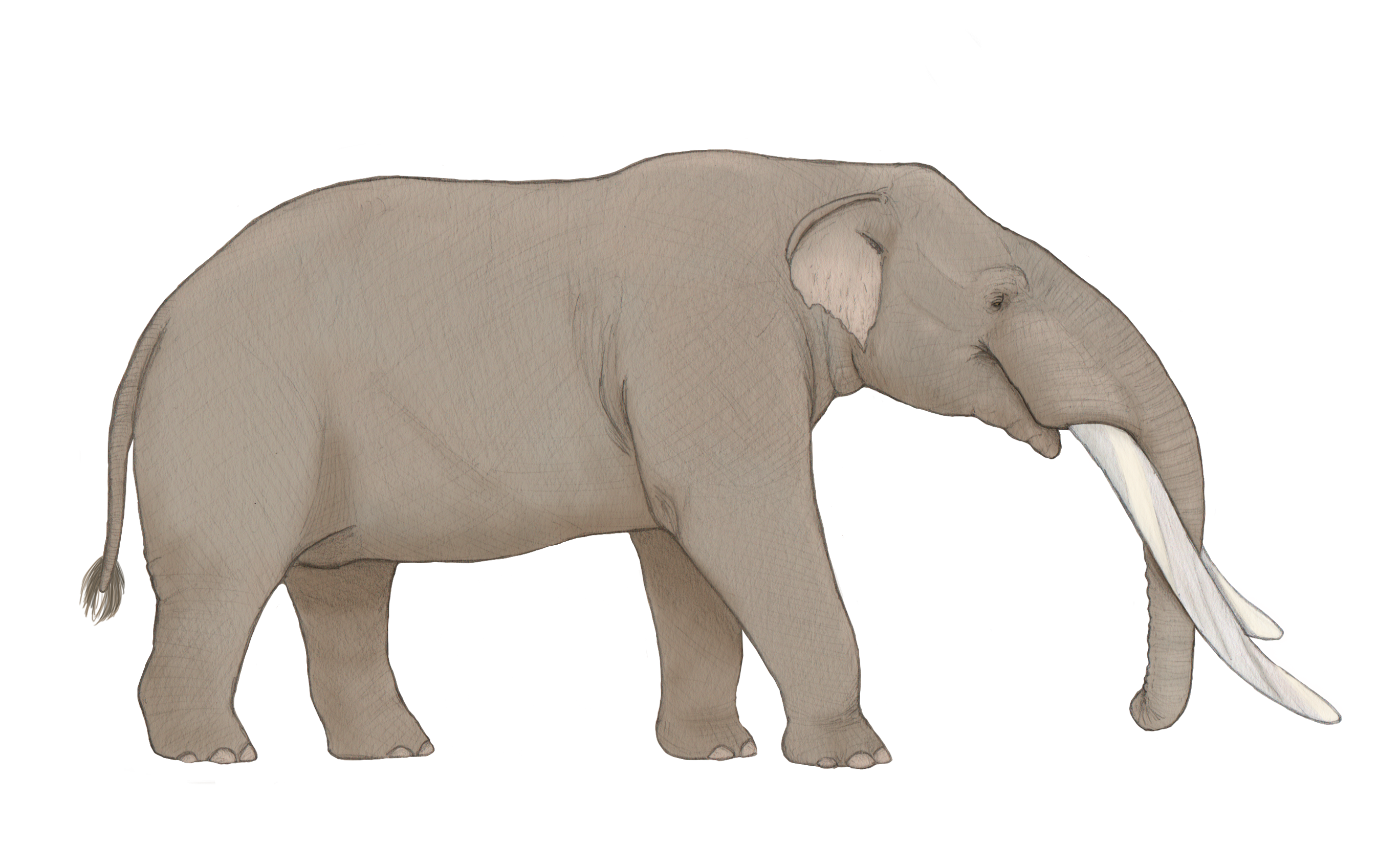
Life restoration of Cuvieronius, a brevirostrine gomphothere

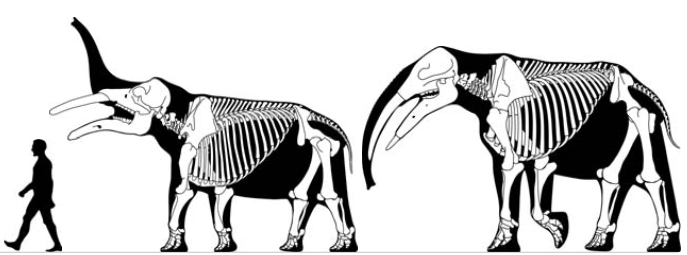
Skeletons of Gomphotherium productum (left) and Gomphotherium steinheimense (right) compared to a 1.8-metre (5 ft 11 in) tall human

Most gomphotheres reached sizes equivalent to those of those of the modern Asian elephant (Elephas maximus), though some gomphotheres reached sizes comparable to or somewhat exceeding African bush elephants (Loxodonta africana). The limb bones of gomphotheres like those of mammutids are generally more robust than elephantids, with the legs also tending to be proportionally shorter. Their bodies also tend to be more proportionally elongate than those of living elephants, resulting in gomphotheres being heavier than an elephant at the same shoulder height.

== Taxonomy ==
"Gomphotheres" are assigned to their own family, Gomphotheriidae, but are widely agreed to be a paraphyletic group. The families Choerolophodontidae and Amebelodontidae (the latter of which includes "shovel tuskers" with flattened lower tusks like Platybelodon) are often considered gomphotheres sensu lato, and sometimes considered subfamilies of Gomphotheriidae. Gomphotheres are divided into two informal groups, "trilophodont gomphotheres", and "tetralophodont gomphotheres". "Tetralophodont gomphotheres" are distinguished from "trilophodont gomphotheres" by the presence of four ridges on the fourth premolar and on the first and second molars, rather than the three present in trilophodont gomphotheres. Some authors choose to exclude "tetralophodont gomphotheres" from Gomphotheriidae, and instead assign them to the group Elephantoidea. "Tetralophodont gomphotheres" like Tetralophodon are thought to have evolved from "trilophodont gomphotheres", in particular having a close relationship with the Gomphotherium species G. steinhemense. "Tetralophodont gomphotheres" are suggested to be ancestral to Elephantidae, the group which contains modern elephants. It has been suggested that the Stegodontidae emerged from the species "Gomphotherium" annectens, which may fall outside of Gomphotheriidae proper.

While the North American long jawed proboscideans Gnathabelodon, Eubelodon and Megabelodon been assigned to Gomphotheriidae in some studies other studies suggest that they should be assigned to Amebelodontidae (Eubelodon, Megabelodon) or Choerolophodontidae (Gnathabelodon).

Cladogram of Elephantimorpha after Li et al. 2023, showing a paraphyletic Gomphotheriidae.

- Elephantimorpha
  - Mammutidae (mastodons)
  - Elephantida (gomphotheres s.l.)
    - Eritreum
    - Gomphotherium annectens
    - - Choerolophodontidae
      - - Amebelodontidae (shovel tuskers)
        - "Gomphotheriidae"
          - - Gomphotherium angustidens
            - - Gomphotherium steinheimense
              - Tetralophodon + Elephantidae
          - - Gomphotherium sylvaticum
            - - Gomphotherium inopinatum
              - - - Gomphotherium browni
                  - Gomphotherium tassyi
                - - Gomphotherium productum + American gomphotheres

== Ecology ==
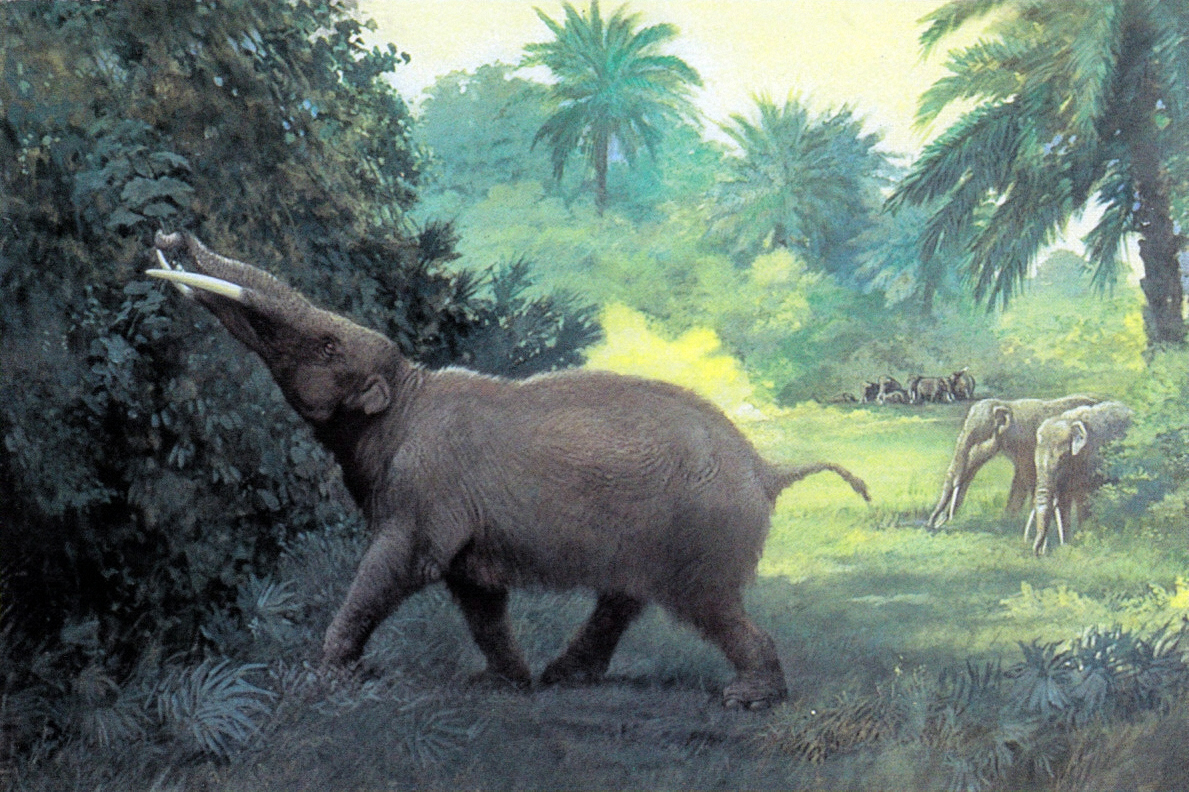
Historic 1901 illustration of Gomphotherium angustidens feeding. By Charles R. Knight.

Gomphotheres are generally supposed to have been flexible feeders, with the various species having differing browsing, mixed feeding and grazing diets, with the dietary preference of individual species and populations being shaped by local factors such as climatic conditions and competition. The tusk-tipped elongate lower jaws of longirostrine gomphotheres were likely used for cutting vegetation, with a secondary contribution in acquiring food using the trunk, while brevirostrine gomphotheres relied primarily on their probably more elongate trunks to acquire food similar to modern elephants.

Analysis of the tusks of a male Notiomastodon individual suggest that it underwent musth, similar to modern elephants. Notiomastiodon is also suggested to have lived in social family groups, like modern elephants. Like other elephantimorphs and modern elephants, gomphotheres are thought to have utilized infrasonic sound for communication, with the morphology of their hyoid bones and inner ear suggesting that they were both capable of hearing and producing infrasonic calls.

== Evolutionary history ==
Gomphotheres originated in Afro-Arabia during the mid-Oligocene, with remains from the Shumaysi Formation in Saudi Arabia dating to around 29-28 million years ago. Gomphotheres were uncommon in Afro-Arabia during the Oligocene. Gomphotheres arrived in Eurasia after the connection of Afro-Arabia and Eurasia during the Early Miocene around 19 million years ago, in what is termed the "Proboscidean Datum Event". Gomphotherium arrived in North America around 16 million years ago, and is suggested to be the ancestor of later New World gomphothere genera. "Trilophodont gomphotheres" dramatically declined during the Late Miocene, likely due to the increasing C_{4} grass-dominated habitats, while during the Late Miocene "tetralophodont gomphotheres" were abundant and widespread in Eurasia, where they represented the dominant group of proboscideans. During the Late Miocene, the "tetralophodont gomphothere" Tetralophodon is suggested to have given rise to the family Elephantidae in Afro-Arabia. All trilophodont gomphotheres, with the exception of the Asian Sinomastodon, became extinct in Eurasia by the beginning of the Pliocene, along with the global extinction of the "shovel tusker" amebelodontids as well as the choerolophodontids. The last gomphotheres in Africa, represented by the "tetralophodont gomphothere" genus Anancus, became extinct around the late Pliocene. The New World gomphothere genera Notiomastodon and Cuvieronius dispersed into South America during the Pleistocene, around or after 2.5 million years ago as part of the Great American Biotic Interchange due to the formation of the Isthmus of Panama, becoming widespread across the continent. The last gomphothere native to Europe, Anancus arvernensis became extinct during the Early Pleistocene, around 1.6–2 million years ago Sinomastodon became extinct at the end of the Early Pleistocene, around 800,000 years ago. From the latter half of the Early Pleistocene onwards, gomphotheres were extirpated from most of North America, likely due to competition with mammoths and mastodons.

The extinction of gomphotheres in Afro-Eurasia has generally been supposed to be the result the expansion of Elephantidae and Stegodon. The morphology of elephantid molars being more efficient than gomphotheres in consuming grass, which became more abundant during the Pliocene and Pleistocene epochs. In southern North America, Central America and South America, gomphotheres did not become extinct until shortly after the arrival of humans to the Americas, approximately 12,000 years ago, as part of the Late Pleistocene megafauna extinctions of most large mammals across the Americas. Bones of the last gomphothere genera, Cuvieronius and Notiomastodon, dating to shortly before their extinction have been found associated with human artifacts produced by Paleoindians, the first humans in the Americas, suggesting that hunting played a role in their extinction.
