= Gnathabelodon =

Gnathabelodon Temporal range: Middle Miocene–Late Miocene

Scientific classification
- Domain: Eukaryota
- Kingdom: Animalia
- Phylum: Chordata
- Class: Mammalia
- Order: Proboscidea
- Family: †Gomphotheriidae
- Subfamily: †Gnathabelodontinae
- Genus: †Gnathabelodon; Barbour and Sternberg, 1935
- Species: †G. thorpei

Binomial name
- †Gnathabelodon thorpei Barbour and Sternberg, 1935

Extinct genus of proboscidean

Gnathabelodon is an extinct genus of gomphothere (a sister group to modern elephants) endemic to North America that includes species that lived during the Middle to Late Miocene.

"Gnathabelodon" buckneri Sellards, 1940 has been renamed Blancotherium.

== Description ==
It has been called the "spoon-billed mastodon" since its lower jaw was elongated and shaped like a shoe-horn or spoon. The flaring of the tip of the lower jaw was similar to that of the "shovel-tuskers" (Platybelodon and Amebelodon); however, Gnathabelodon species are distinct in having no lower tusks whilst the "shovel tuskers" have broad, flattened lower tusks. The presence of a long lower jaw but no lower tusks is highly unusual among proboscideans, and only shared with Eubelodon and Choerolophodon. The upper tusks are large and curve outwards and upwards. With respect to dentition and overall body form, it was similar to species of Gomphotherium, but Mothe et al. (2016) recover Gnathabelodon as closer to brevirostrine gomphotheriids than to Gomphotherium.

== Taxonomy ==
While some studies have assigned the genus to Gomphotheriidae, other have suggested that it may have closer affinities with Choerolophodontidae.

== Sources ==
- A Pictorial Guide to Fossils by Gerard Ramon Case
- Classification of Mammals by Malcolm C. McKenna and Susan K. Bell
