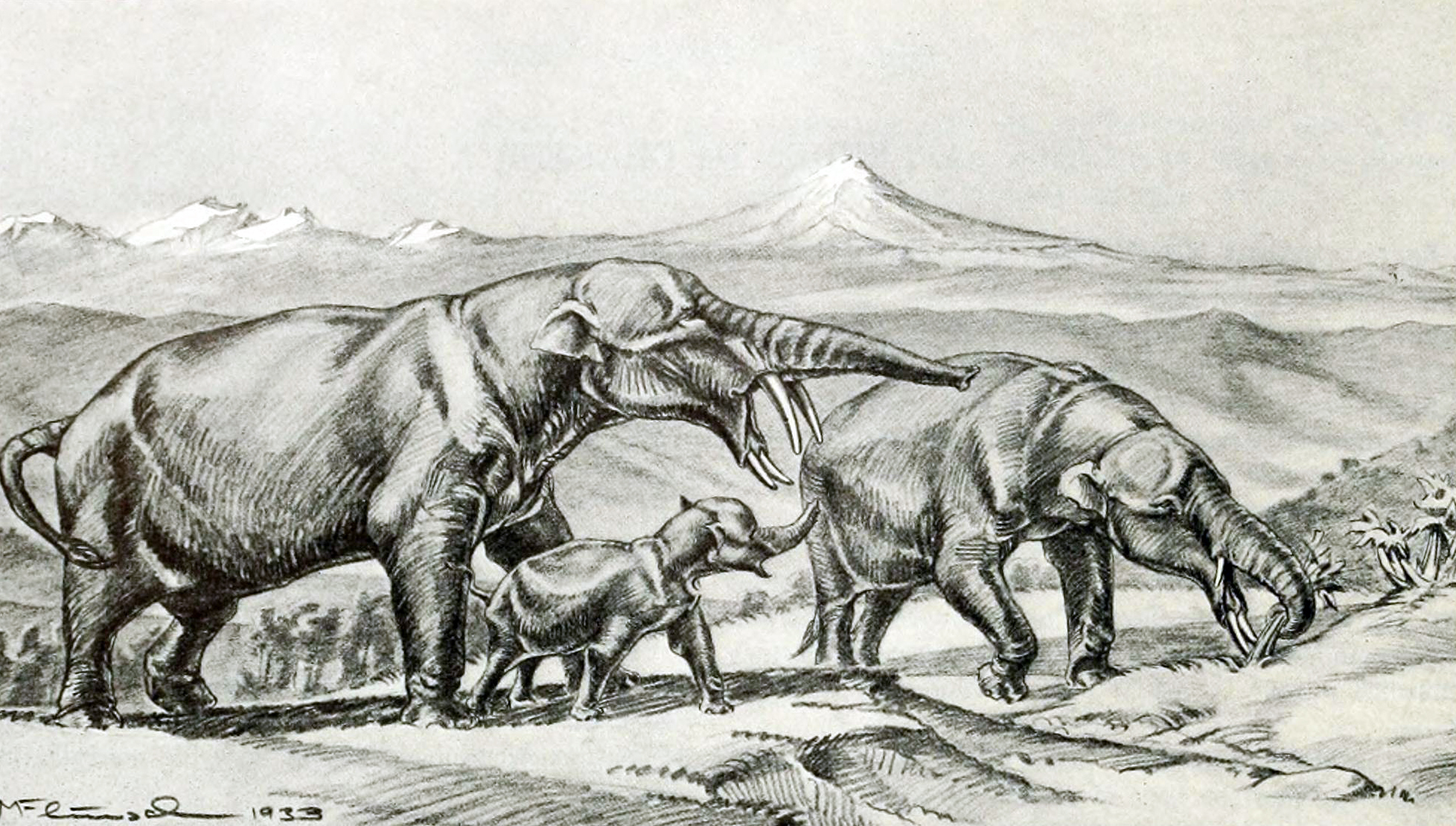
- Restoration

Scientific classification
- Kingdom: Animalia
- Phylum: Chordata
- Class: Mammalia
- Order: Proboscidea
- Family: †Gomphotheriidae
- Genus: †Rhynchotherium; Falconer, 1868

Type species
- †Rhynchotherium falconeri Osborn, 1923

Species
- R. browni; R. edensis; R. falconeri; R. paredensis; R. simpsoni

= Rhynchotherium =

Rhynchotherium Temporal range: 5.9–2.2 Ma Late Hemphillian - Blancan

Extinct genus of proboscid

Rhynchotherium is an extinct genus of gomphothere endemic to the southern USA and Mexico from the Miocene to the Early Pleistocene (5.9 to 2.2 Ma). This temporal range also corresponds from the late Hemphillian faunal stage (Hh4) to the Late Blancan faunal stage, with Rhynchotherium being considered by some researchers as a taxon emblematic of the Blancan faunal stage. Rhynchotherium had two tusks and likely evolved from Gomphotherium.

== Taxonomy ==
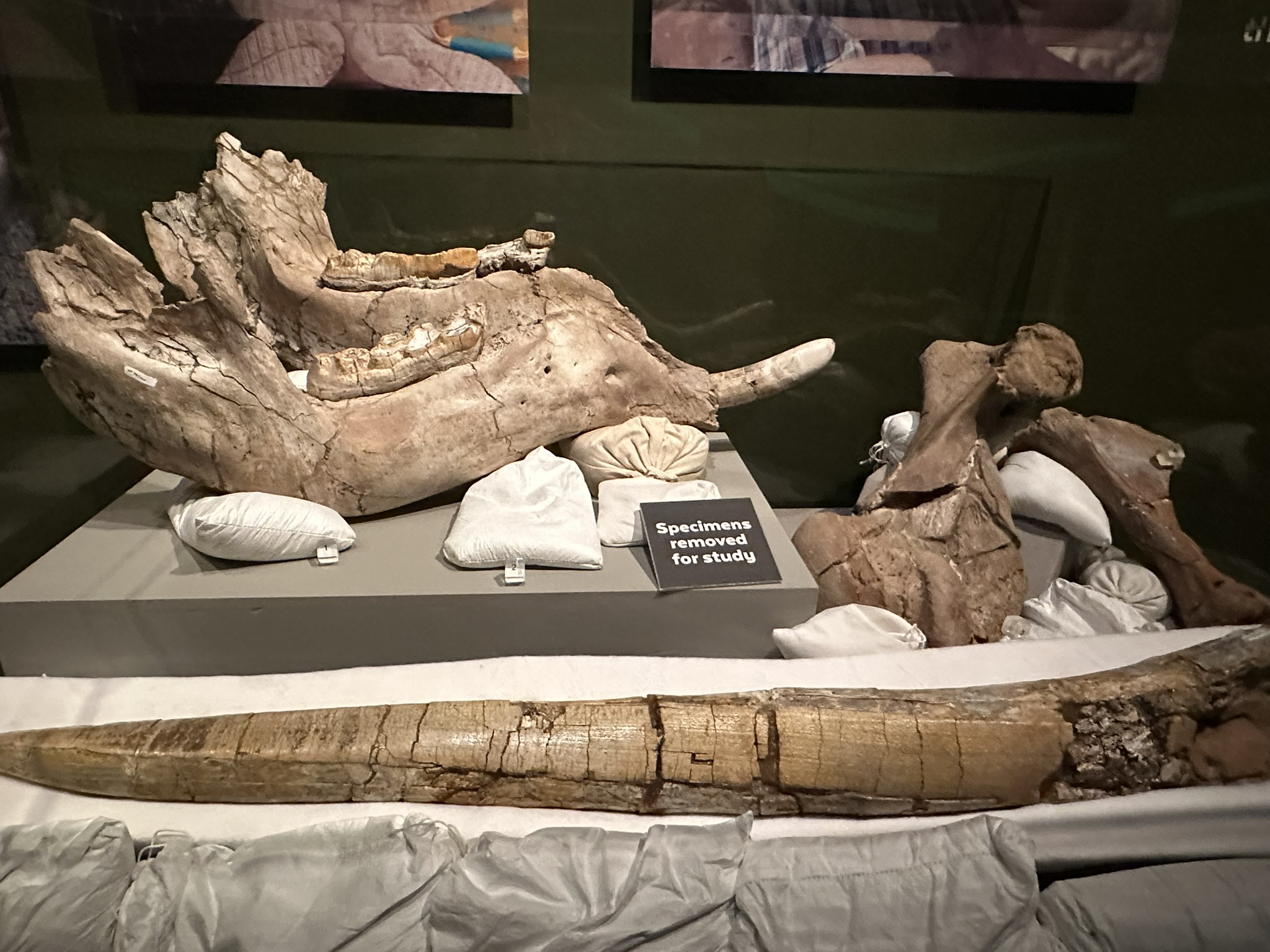
Jaw, tusk, and vertebrae of Rhynchotherium, Florida Museum of Natural History

Rhynchotherium was first described in 1868 on the basis of a lower jaw from the Miocene of Tlaxcala, Mexico. Later, the type species epithet R. tlascalae was erected for the jaw by Henry Fairfield Osborn in 1918. In 1921, a gomphothere skull from the Mt. Eden area of southern California was described as a subspecies of Trilophodon shepardi (a now-defunct combination for Mastodon shepardi), T. s. edensis, but was subsequently reassigned to Rhynchotherium. Other species subsequently assigned to Rhynchotherium included R. falconeri, R. paredensis, R. browni, and R. simpsoni. It was the closest relative to Cuvieronius, and may be ancestral to it.

Lucas and Morgan (2008) reviewed the taxonomy of Rhynchotherium and concluded that only R. edensis, R. falconeri, R. paredensis, R. browni, and R. simpsoni could be confidently referred to Rhynchotherium. Because the genotype of Rhynchotherium is referable to Gomphotherium, the ICZN was petitioned to conserve the genus by designating R. falconeri as the type species, which it did.

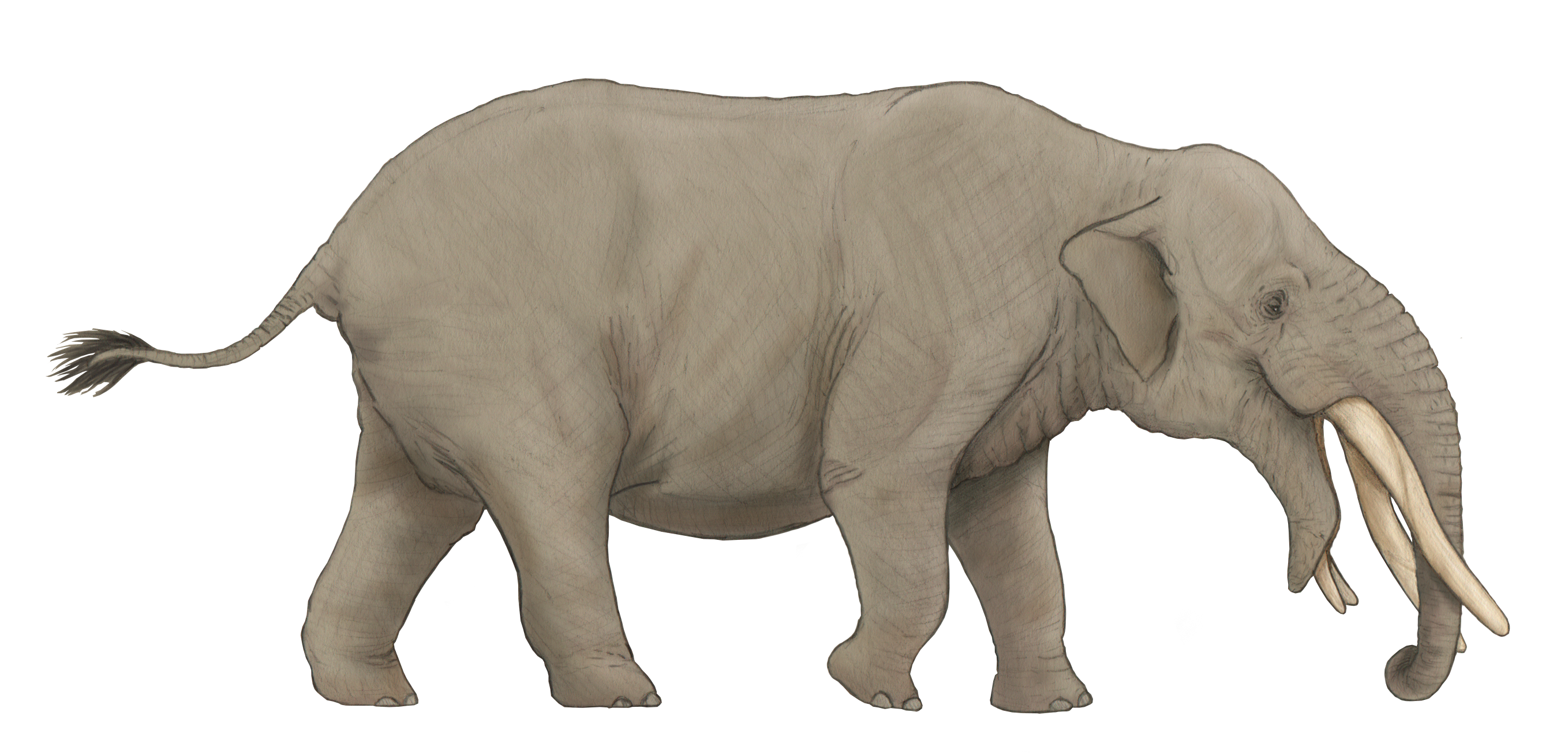
Life restoration of Rhynchotherium falconeri, a North American species of the genus.

=== Misassigned species ===
- Mastodon shepardi Leidy, 1871
- Mastodon euhypodon Cope, 1884 - likely a species of Gomphotherium
- Tetrabelodon brevidens Cope, 1889
- Dibelodon praecursor Cope, 1893
- Rhynchotherium rectidens Osborn, 1923
- Aybelodon hondurensis Frick, 1933
- Blickotherium blicki Frick, 1933
- Rhynchotherium anguirivale Osborn, 1936

Phylogenetic position according to Mothé et al. (2016)

- †Gomphotheriidae (Gomphotheres)
  - †Gomphotherium
  - - †Gnathabelodon
    - - †Eubelodon
      - Brevirostrine clade
        - †Stegomastodon
        - - †Sinomastodon
          - - †Notiomastodon
            - - †Rhynchotherium
              - †Cuvieronius

== Life history ==
Rhynchotherium appears to have travelled in large mixed-age herds. At least two Rhynchotherium death assemblages, dubbed "elephant graveyards", are known from opposite sides of the continent, in California and Florida. The Florida site contains 3,000 individual fossils representing 38 individuals, including at least one complete adult and seven complete juveniles. The site appears to represent an area where Rhynchotherium herds repeatedly became trapped and died, potentially around the curve of a river that they periodically crossed. Some individuals may have also been washed into the site from upstream.

== Palaeoecology ==
Although traditionally thought to be a browser, analysis of enamel δ^{13}C of Rhynchotherium teeth from the Bone Valley deposits of Florida dating to the Early Pliocene suggests that they fed almost exclusively on C_{4} grasses.
