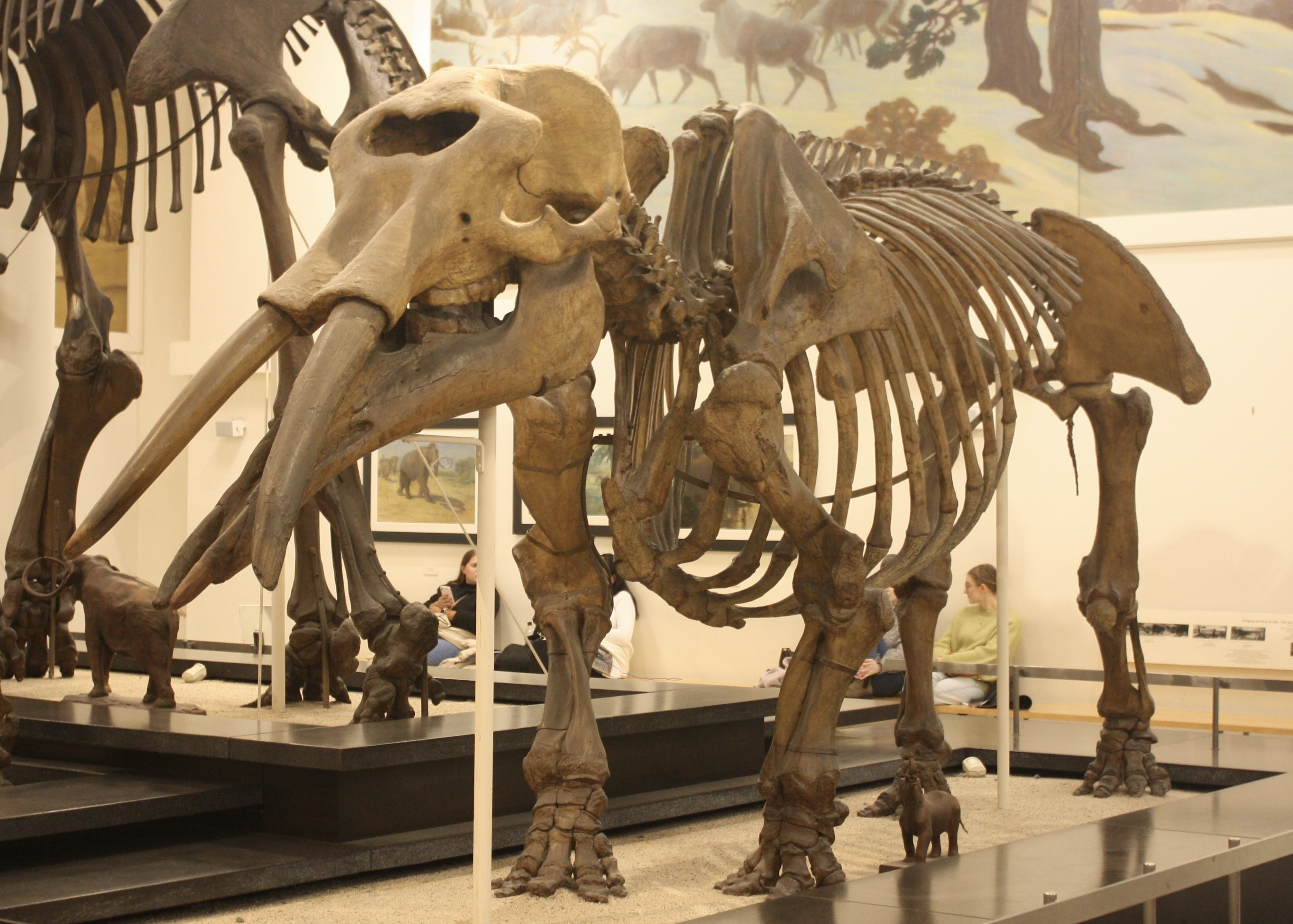
- Specimen of Gomphotherium productum at the American Museum of Natural History
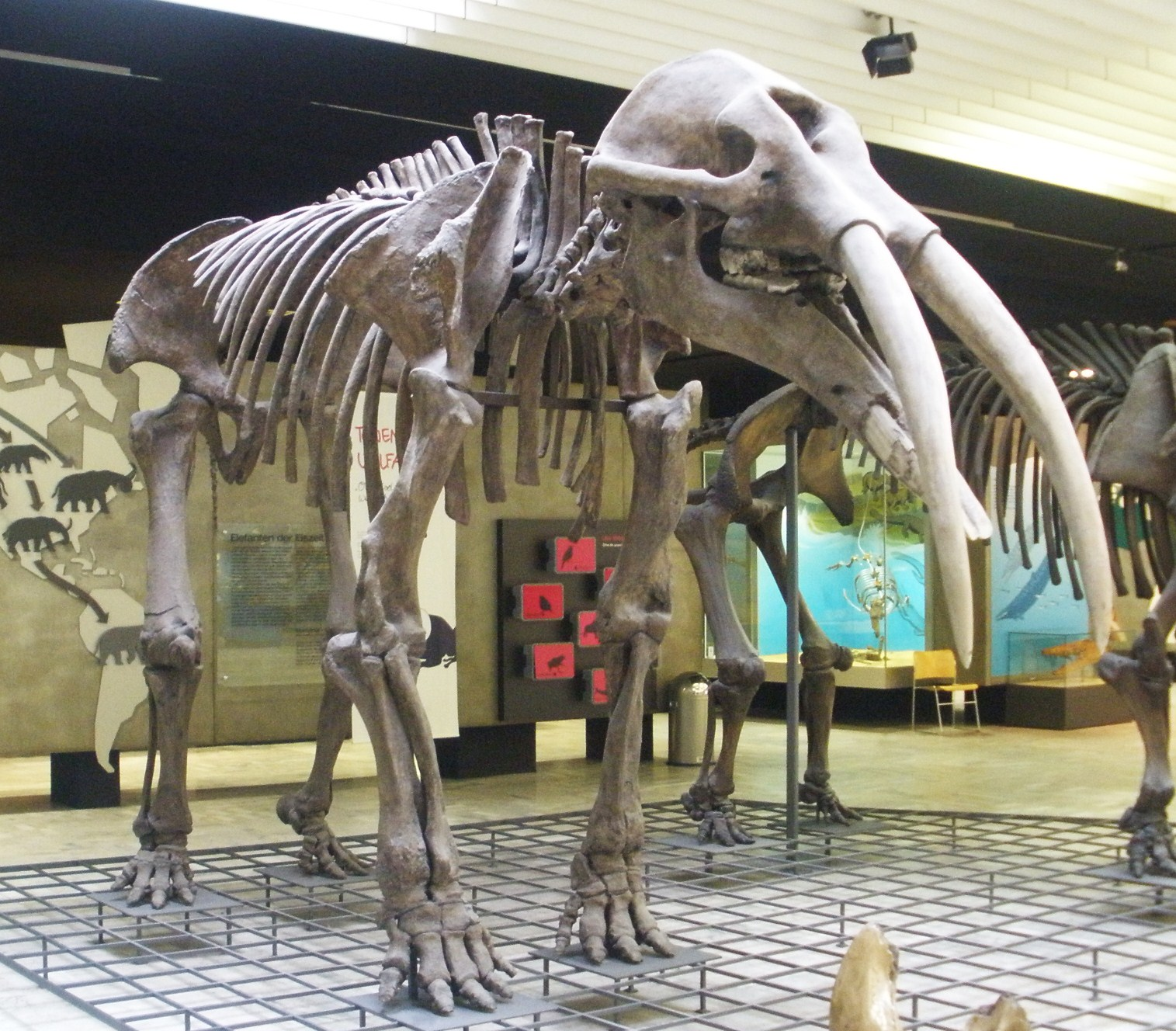
- Skeleton of Gomphotherium angustidens at the Senckenberg Museum of Frankfurt

Scientific classification
- Kingdom: Animalia
- Phylum: Chordata
- Class: Mammalia
- Order: Proboscidea
- Family: †Gomphotheriidae
- Genus: †Gomphotherium; Burmeister, 1837

Type species
- Gomphotherium angustidens (Cuvier, 1817)

Species
- See text

Synonyms
- Trilophodon Falconer and Cautley, 1846; Bunolophodon Vacek, 1877; Tetrabelodon Cope, 1884; Serridentinus Osborn, 1923; Trobelodon Frick, 1933; Ocalientinus Frick, 1933; Tatabelodon Frick, 1933

= Gomphotherium =

Gomphotherium Temporal range: Early Miocene to Early Pliocene (Aquitanian to Zanclean) 19.5–5 Ma

Extinct genus of elephant-like mammals

Gomphotherium (/ˌɡɒmfəˈθɪəriəm/; "nail beast" for its double set of straight tusks) is an extinct genus of gomphothere proboscidean from the Neogene of Eurasia, Africa and North America. It is the most diverse genus of gomphothere, with over a dozen valid species. The genus is probably paraphyletic, and ancestral to other gomphothere genera, as well as ultimately living elephantids.

== Description ==
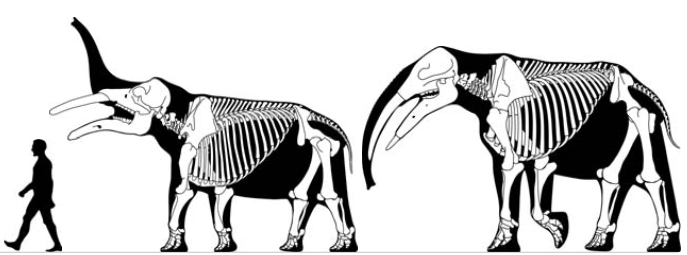
Skeletal restoration of G. productum (left) and G. steinheimense (right) compared to a human

Most species of Gomphotherium were similar in size to the Asian elephant, with G. productum (known from a 35-year-old male) measuring 2.51 m (8 ft 3 in) tall and weighing 4.6 t (4.5 long tons; 10,000 lb). The largest species, G. steinheimense (known from a complete 37-year-old male found in Mühldorf, Germany), measured up to 3.17 m (10 ft 5 in) tall and weighed 6.7 t (6.6 long tons; 15,000 lb).

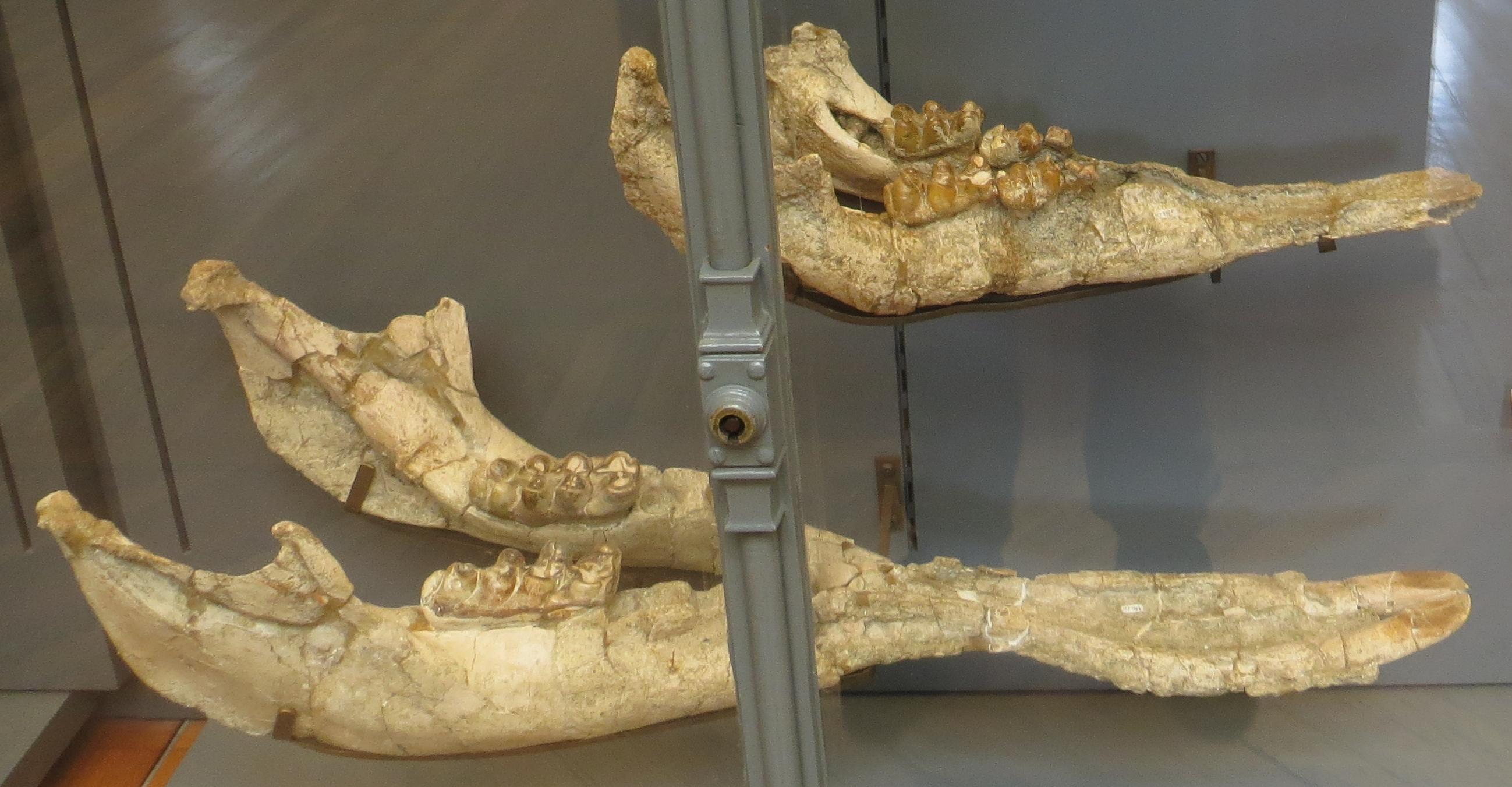
Lower jaws of Gomphotherium angustidens showing elongate mandibular symphysis and lower tusks

Gomphotherium, like most basal elephantimorphs, had an elongated lower jaw (with the elongation specifically being the fused front-most part, the mandibular symphysis) which bore tusks. Species of Gomphotherium are defined by their conservative molar morphology, which includes "trilophed intermediate molars, third molars with three to four loph(id)s, and pretrite half-loph(id)s typically with anterior and posterior accessory conules that form trefoil-patterned enamel loops with wear (simple molar crowns with no accessory conules on the posttrite side of the crown)". It has been suggested that like other long-jawed elephantimorphs, that the trunk was relatively short in comparison to living elephants, probably not reaching much further than the tips of tusks on the lower jaw.

== Ecology ==
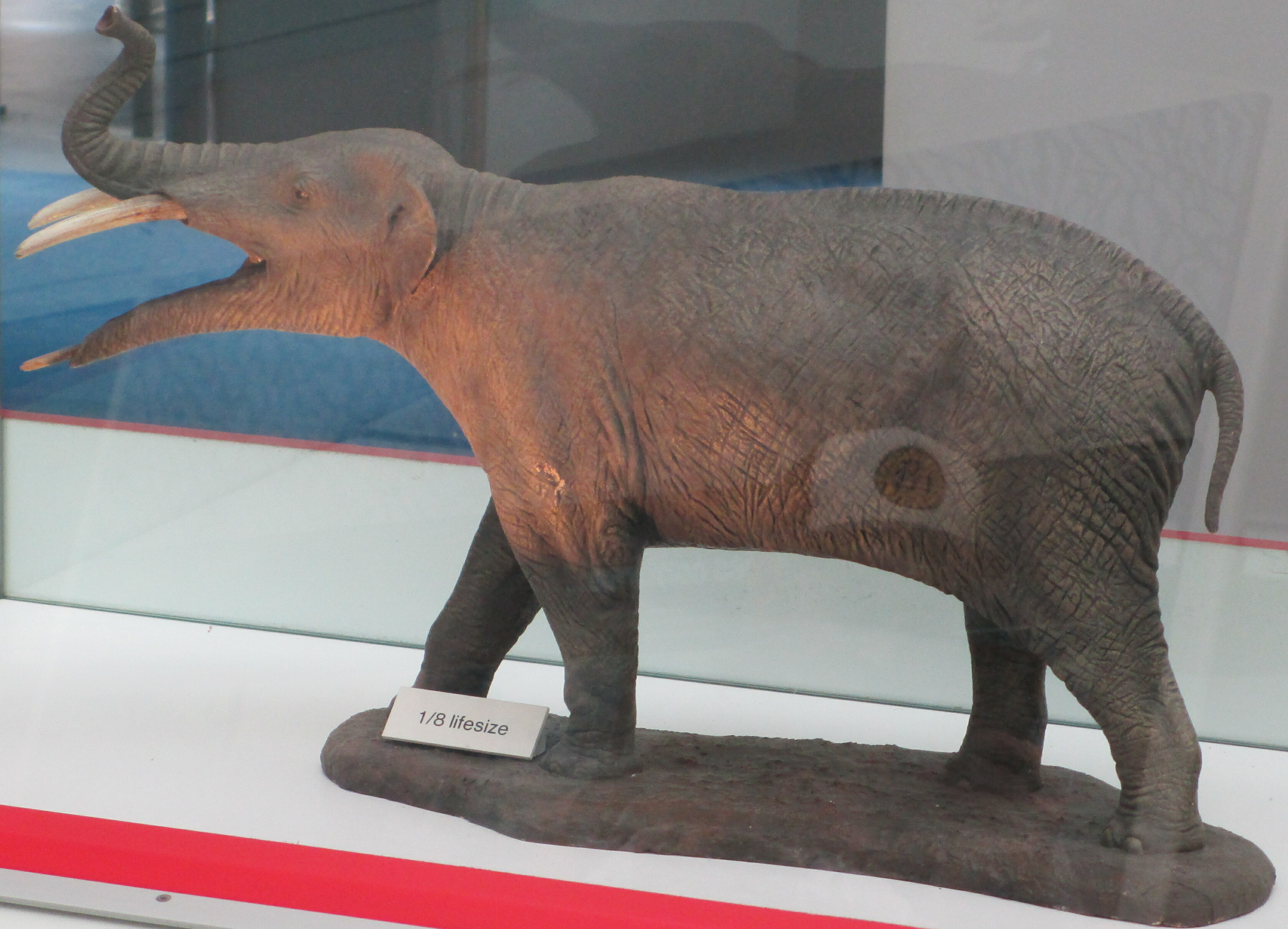
Miniature model of Gomphotherium productum at the Natural History Museum in London

Most species of Gomphotherium are inferred to have been browsers or mixed feeders, but specimens of G. steinheimense from China are suggested to have been grazers. Oxygen and carbon isotopes from G. productum enamel unearthed in the Port of Entry Pit, Oklahoma reveal it fed predominantly on C_{3} plants year-round. Gomphotherium, like other elephantimorphs with long lower jaws, is thought to have used its tusks on the lower jaw to cut through vegetation while it was being held in place by the trunk, which likely had a high level of flexibility similar to living elephants. Its feeding strategy is suggested to have been relatively unspecialised, unlike some other contemporary long-jawed elephantimorphs such as Choerolophodon or the amebelodontid Platybelodon. A 2026 study analyzed the chemical composition of teeth of Gomphotherium angustidens from the Miocene (Langhian) strata from Quinta da Farinheira of Portugal, providing evidence of seasonal changes in its diet and probable evidence of geophagia during fixed times of the year.

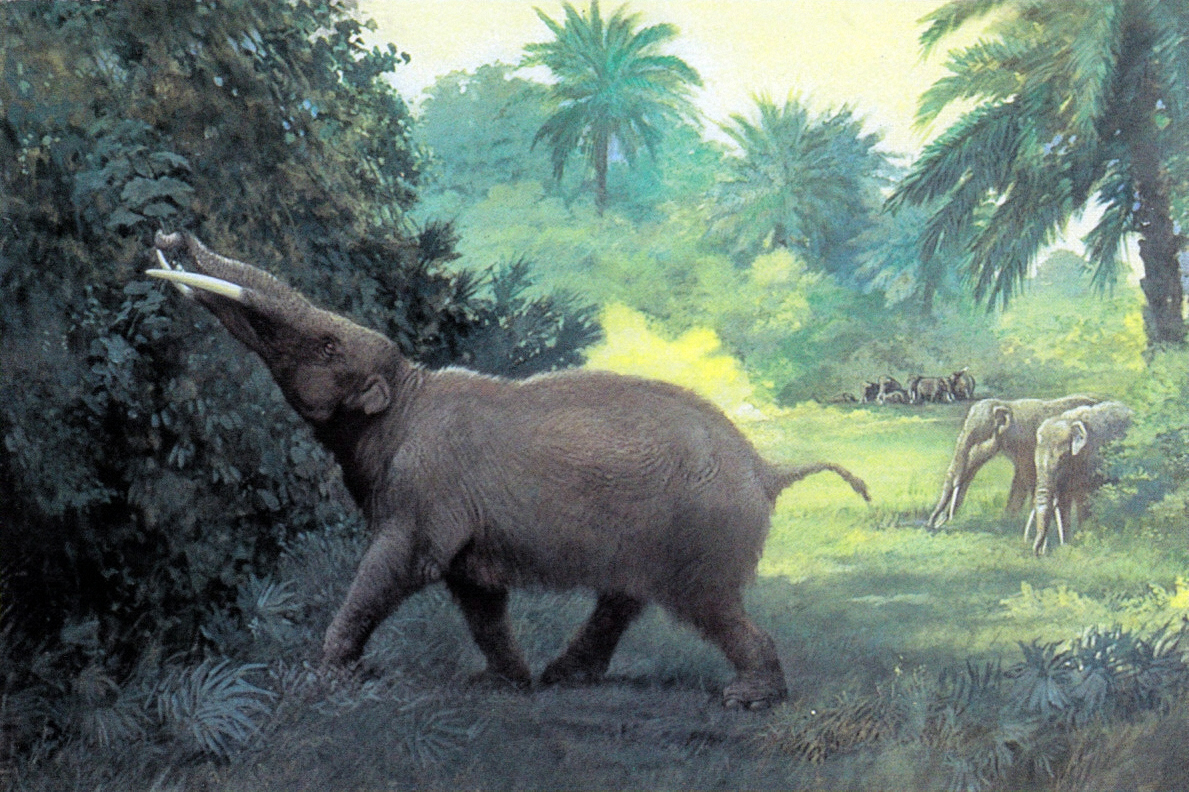
Historic 1901 illustration of Gomphotherium angustidens feeding. By Charles R. Knight.

== Evolution ==
Gomphotherium likely originated in Africa during the late Oligocene-early Miocene. The oldest remains of Gomphotherium are known from Africa, dating to approximately 19.5 million years ago. Gomphotherium migrated into Eurasia across the "Gomphotherium land bridge" approximately 19 million years ago. Gomphotherium underwent rapid evolution after its arrival in Eurasia, reaching its peak diversity during the Early-Middle Miocene. Gomphotherium has been posited to be paraphyletic and the ancestor of later gomphothere genera, including the "tetralophodont gomphotheres", such as Tetralophodon (which is suggested to have a close relationship with the species G. steinheimense) which are probably ancestral to elephantids. Gomphotherium annectens has been suggested to be the ancestor of the stegodontids. Gomphotherium first arrived in North America during the mid-Miocene, approximately 16-15 million years ago, and is suggested to be ancestral to later New World gomphothere genera, such as Cuvieronius, Stegomastodon and Rhynchotherium. Asian populations of Gomphotherium are suggested to have been ancestral to Sinomastodon. Gomphotherium became extinct in northern China during the Middle Miocene around 13 million years ago. The youngest remains attributed to Gomphotherium in Africa date to around 13-10 million years ago. The last European species of Gomphotherium became extinct at the beginning of the Late Miocene, around the start of MN9, approximately 10 million years ago. The last Gomphotherium species disappeared from North America at the beginning of the Pliocene, approximately 5 million years ago.

== Taxonomy ==
=== Species ===
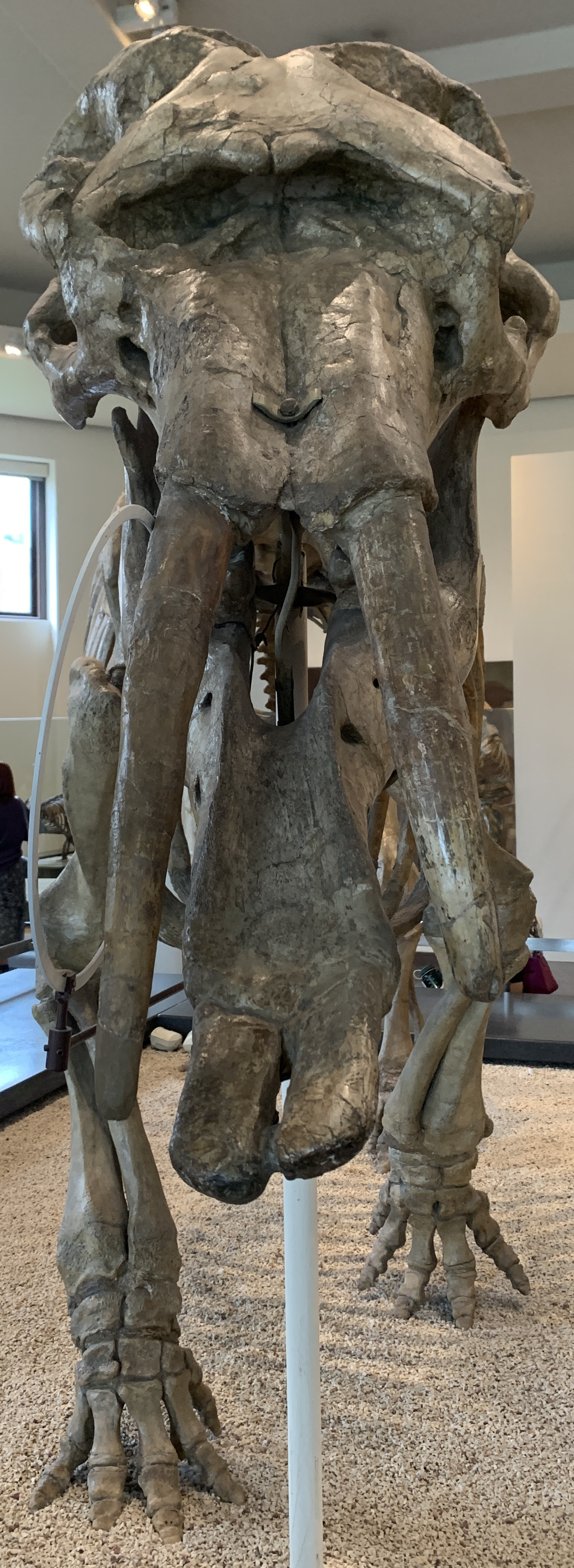
Front view of G. productum. Collected from Clarendon, Texas. At the AMNH.

Over a dozen species of Gomphotherium are considered valid, with over 30 junior synonyms proposed for these taxa.

- G. hannibali Welcomme, 1994 Europe, Early Miocene
- G. annectens (Matsumoto, 1925)(=Bunolophodon yokotii Makiyama, 1938) Japan and North Korea, Early Miocene
- G. cooperi (Osborn, 1932) Asia, Early Miocene
- G. sylvaticum Tassy, 1985 Europe, Early Miocene
- G. libycum (Fourtau, 1918) Egypt, Early Miocene
- G. inopinatum (Borissiak and Belyaeva, 1928) China, late Early Miocene-Early middle Miocene
- G. mongoliense (Osborn, 1924) Mongolia, late Early Miocene-Early middle Miocene
- G. angustidens (Cuvier, 1817) (type) Europe, Middle Miocene
- G. subtapiroideum (Schlesinger, 1917) Europe, Early-Middle Miocene
- G. tassyi Wang, Li, Duangkrayom, Yang, He & Chen, 2017 China, Middle Miocene
- G. browni (Osborn, 1926) Pakistan, Middle Miocene
- G. steinheimense (Klahn, 1922) Europe, China, Middle-Late Miocene
- G. productum (Cope, 1874) North America, Middle Miocene-Early Pliocene
- G. pyrenaicum (Lartet, 1859) Europe, Middle Miocene

Phylogeny after Wang et al., 2017

- - Phiomia serridens
  - - Eritreum melakeghebrekristosi
    - Gomphotherium sp. (Mwiti)
    - - Gomphotherium hannibali
      - - Gomphotherium annectens
        - - Gomphotherium cooperi
          - - Gomphotherium sylvaticum
            - - Gomphotherium libycum
              - Gomphotherium pygmaeus
            - - - Gomphotherium inopinatum
                - - Gomphotherium mongoliense
                  - - Gomphotherium angustidens (s. s.)
                    - Gomphotherium connexum
              - - - Gomphotherium subtapiroideum
                  - Gomphotherium tassyi
                - - Gomphotherium wimani
                  - - Gomphotherium browni
                    - Gomphotherium productum
                    - Gomphotherium steinheimense

Cladogram of Elephantiformes after Li et al. 2023, showing a paraphyletic Gomphotheriidae and Gomphotherium.

- Elephantiformes
  - Phiomia
  - Elephantimorpha
    - Mammutidae (mastodons)
    - Gomphotheres sensu lato
      - Eritreum
      - Gomphotherium annectens
      - - Choerolophodontidae
        - - Amebelodontidae (shovel tuskers)
          - "Gomphotheriidae"
            - - Gomphotherium angustidens
              - - Gomphotherium steinheimense
                - Tetralophodon + Elephantidae
            - - Gomphotherium sylvaticum
              - - Gomphotherium inopinatum
                - - - Gomphotherium browni
                    - Gomphotherium tassyi
                  - - Gomphotherium productum + American gomphotheres
