= Perception of infrasound =

Animal perception of low frequency sounds

Infrasound is sound at frequencies lower than the low frequency end of human hearing threshold at 20 Hz. It is known, however, that humans can perceive sounds below this frequency at very high pressure levels. Infrasound can come from many natural as well as man-made sources, including weather patterns, topographic features, ocean wave activity, thunderstorms, geomagnetic storms, earthquakes, jet streams, mountain ranges, and rocket launchings. Infrasounds are also present in the vocalizations of some animals. Low frequency sounds can travel for long distances with very little attenuation and can be detected hundreds of miles away from their sources.

== Mammals ==
The production and perception of infrasound has been observed in multiple mammals, including whale, elephant, giraffe, hippopotamus, and rhinoceros. For most of these animals, observations are preliminary and their sensitivity to infrasound has not been quantified. If an animal produces a low frequency sound, and uses it in communication, it suggests the animal might also be sensitive to infrasound.

=== Elephants ===
Elephants are the terrestrial animal in which the production of infrasonic calls was first noted by M. Krishnan, later discovered by Katy Payne. The use of low frequency sounds to communicate over long distances may explain certain elephant behaviors that have previously puzzled observers. Elephant groups that are separated by several kilometers have been observed to travel in parallel or to change the direction simultaneously and move directly towards each other in order to meet. The time of estrus for females is asynchronous, lasts only for a few days, and occurs only every several years. Nevertheless, males, which usually wander apart from female groups, rapidly gather from many directions to compete for a receptive female. Since infrasound can travel for very long distances, it has been suggested that calls in the infrasonic range might be important for long distance communication for such coordinated behaviors among separated elephants.

==== Infrasound production and perception ====
Recordings and playback experiments support that elephants use the infrasonic components of their calls for communication. Infrasonic vocalizations have been recorded from captive elephants in many different situations. The structure of the calls varies greatly but most of them range in frequency from 14 to 24 Hz, with durations of 10–15 seconds. When the nearest elephant is 5 m from the microphone, the recorded sound pressure levels can be 85 to 90 dB SPL. Some of these calls are completely inaudible to humans, while others have audible components that are probably due to higher frequency harmonics of below 20 Hz fundamentals. Sometimes, vocalizations cause perceptible rumbles that are accompanied by a fluttering of the skin on the calling elephant's forehead where the nasal passage enters the skull. This fluttering can also occur without causing any perceptible sound, suggesting the production of a purely infrasonic call. The mechanism of infrasonic call production in elephants has not been determined.

Playback experiments using prerecorded elephant vocalizations show that elephants can perceive infrasound and how they respond to these stimuli. In playback experiments, certain behaviors that occur commonly after vocalizations are scored before and after a call is played. These behaviors include lifting and stiffening of ears, vocalization, walking or running towards the concealed speaker, clustering in a tight group, and remaining motionless ("freezing"), with occasional scanning movements of the head. The occurrence of such behaviors consistently increases after the playing of a call, whether it is a full-bandwidth playback or a playback in which most of the energy above 25 Hz was filtered out. This filtering shows that the behaviorally significant information of the call is contained in the infrasonic range, and it also simulates the effect of frequency-dependent attenuation over distance as it might occur in the wild. Behavioral responses do not increase for pure tone stimuli that are similar to recorded infrasonic calls in frequency and intensity. This shows that the responses are specifically to signals that were meaningful to the elephants.

The use of prerecorded playbacks and behavioral scoring also shows that the infrasonic elephant calls are behaviorally significant over long distances. The degree of response behaviors performed by an elephant group, such as lifting of ears, walking towards the speakers, “freezing”, or scanning movements, was compared visually before and after the presentation of a stimulus, scoring a trial as a positive response if the amount of behaviors is greater after the stimulus. In one particular experiment performed on elephants living in the wild, the presentation of playbacks for 20–40 seconds from loudspeakers at distances of 1.2 km and 2 km caused a significant increase in response behaviors. Since the playbacks were done at half the amplitude at which they were recorded, it is estimated that these calls would be perceptible by elephants at distances of at least 4 km Even this may be an underestimate because animals do not respond every time they perceive a conspecific call, and they are probably less likely to respond to calls from further distances even if they do perceive them.

There are some confounding factors that might influence the results of this kind of experiment. Firstly, the animals might actually be more sensitive than the experiments would indicate owing to habituation of the animals to the playback stimuli after several trial repetitions. To avoid this, researchers present several different types of playbacks in random order. Another problem that might arise in interpreting field experiments done on groups of animals is that animals may be responding to signals from other elephants in the group rather than the playback stimulus. However, an assumption is made that at least one animal in the group did perceive and respond directly to the stimulus.

==== Infrasound sensitivity ====
The auditory sensitivity thresholds have been measured behaviorally for one individual young female Indian elephant. The conditioning test for sensitivity requires the elephant to respond to a stimulus by pressing a button with its trunk, which results in a sugar water reward if the elephant correctly identified the appropriate stimulus occurrence. To determine auditory sensitivity thresholds, a certain frequency of sound is presented at various intensities to see at which intensity the stimulus ceases to evoke a response. The auditory sensitivity curve of this particular elephant began at 16 Hz with a threshold of 65 dB. A shallow slope decreased to the best response at 1 kHz with a threshold of 8 dB, followed by a steep threshold increase above 4 kHz. According to the 60 dB cutoff, the upper limit was 10.5 kHz with absolutely no detectable response at 14 kHz. The upper limit for humans is considered to be 18 kHz. The upper and lower limits of elephant hearing are the lowest measured for any animals aside from the pigeon. By contrast, the average best frequency for animal hearing is 9.8 kHz, the average upper limit is 55 kHz.

The ability to differentiate frequencies of two successive tones was also tested for this elephant using a similar conditioning paradigm. The elephant's responses were somewhat erratic, which is typical for mammals in this test. Nevertheless, the ability to discriminate sounds was best at frequencies below 1 kHz particularly at measurements of 500 Hz and 250 Hz.

Tests of the ability to localize sounds also showed the significance of low frequency sound perception in elephants. Localization was tested by observing the successful orienting towards the left or the right source loudspeakers when they were positioned at different angles from the elephant's head. The elephant could localize sounds best at a frequency below 1 kHz, with perfect identification of the left or right speaker at angles of 20 degrees or more, and chance level discriminations below 2 degrees. Sound localization ability was measured to be best at 125 Hz and 250 Hz, intermediate at 500 Hz, 1 kHz, and 2 kHz, and very poor at frequencies of 4 kHz and above. A possible reason for this is that elephants are very good at using interaural phase differences which are effective for localizing low frequency sounds, but not as good at using interaural intensity differences which are better for higher frequency sounds. Because of the elephant head size and the large distance between their ears, interaural difference cues become confused when wavelengths are shorter, explaining why sound localization was very poor at frequencies above 4 kHz. It was observed that the elephant spread the pinna of its ears only during the sound localization tasks, but the precise effect of this behavior is unknown.

== Birds ==
Although birds do not produce vocalizations in the infrasonic range, reactions to infrasonic stimuli have been observed in several species, such as the homing pigeon, the guineafowl, and the Asian grouse. It is postulated that birds might use the detection of naturally occurring infrasound for long-range directional cues from distant landmarks, or for weather detection. Since hearing tests at infrasonic frequencies have been conducted on a small number of bird species, the true diversity of this ability among birds is unknown.

=== Pigeons ===
Infrasound perception has been observed and quantified in the homing pigeon which has particularly good long distance navigation skills. The precise relevance of such signals for the pigeon is still unknown, but several uses for infrasound have been hypothesized, such as navigation and detection of air turbulences when flying and landing.

==== Infrasound sensitivity ====
In experiments using heart rate conditioning, pigeons have been found to be able to detect sounds in the infrasonic range at frequencies as low as 0.5 Hz. For frequencies below 10 Hz, the pigeon threshold is at about 55 dB which is at least 50 dB more sensitive than humans. Pigeons are able to discriminate small frequency differences in sounds at between 1 Hz and 20 Hz, with sensitivity ranging from a 1% shift at 20 Hz to a 7% shift at 1 Hz. Sensitivities are measured through a heart rate conditioning test. In this test, an anesthetized bird is presented with a single sound or a sequence of sounds, followed by an electric shock. The bird's heart rate will increase in anticipation of a shock. Therefore, a measure of the heart rate can determine whether the bird is able to distinguish between stimuli that would be followed by a shock from stimuli that would not. Similar methods have also been used to determine the pigeon's sensitivity to barometric pressure changes, polarized light, and UV light. These experiments were conducted in sound isolation chambers to avoid the influence of ambient noise. Infrasonic stimuli are hard to produce and are often transmitted through a filter that attenuates higher frequency components. Also, the tone burst stimuli used in these experiments were presented with stimulus onset and offsets ramped on and off gradually in order to prevent initial turn-on and turn-off transients.

In order to use infrasound for navigation, it is necessary to be able to localize the source of the sounds. The known mechanisms for sound localizations make use of the time difference cues at the two ears. However, infrasound has such long wavelengths that these mechanisms would not be effective for an animal the size of a pigeon. An alternative method that has been hypothesized is through the use of the Doppler shift. A Doppler shift occurs when there is relative motion between a sound source and a perceiver and slightly shifts the perceived frequency of the sound. When a flying bird is changing direction, the amplitude of the Doppler shift between it and an infrasonic source would change, enabling the bird to locate the source. This kind of mechanism would require the ability to detect very small changes in frequency. A pigeon typically flies at 20 km/h, so a turn could cause up to a 12% modulation of an infrasonic stimulus. According to response measurements, pigeons are able to distinguish frequency changes of 1–7 % in the infrasonic range, showing that the use of Doppler shifts for infrasound localization may be within the pigeon's perceptive capabilities.

In early experiments with infrasound sensitivity in pigeons, surgical removal of the columella, a bone that links the tympanic membrane to the inner ear, in each ear severely reduced the ability to respond to infrasound, increasing the sensitivity threshold by about 50 dB. Complete surgical removal of the entire cochlea, lagena, and columellae completely abolished any response to infrasound. This shows that the receptors for infrasonic stimuli may be located in the inner ear.

==== Infrasound-sensitive nerve fibers ====
Neural fibers that are sensitive to infrasonic stimuli have been identified in the pigeon and their characteristics have been studied. It turns out that, although these fibers also originate in the inner ear, they are quite different from normal acoustic fibers. Infrasound sensitive fibers have very high rates of spontaneous discharge, with a mean of 115 impulses per second, which is much higher than the spontaneous discharge of other auditory fibers. Recordings show that discharge rates do not increase in response to infrasound stimuli but are modulated at levels comparable to the behavioral thresholds. Modulation depth is dependent on stimulus frequency and intensity. The modulation is phase locked so that the discharge rate increases during one phase of the stimulus and decreases during the other, leaving the mean discharge rate constant. Such pulse-frequency modulation allows the stimulus analysis to be independent of the peripheral tuning of the basilar membrane or the hair cells, which is already poor at low auditory frequencies. Unlike other acoustic fibers, infrasonic fibers do not show any indication of being tuned to a particular characteristic frequency.

By injecting fibers that were identified to be sensitive to infrasound with HRP (Horseradish Peroxidase), the location and morphology of the stained fibers can be observed in sections under a microscope. Infrasound sensitive fibers are found to be simple bipolar cells in the auditory ganglion with a diameter of 1.6 – 2.2 μm at the axon and 0.9 – 1.2 μm at the dendrites. They originate in the apical end of the cochlea and they are located near fibers that transmit low frequency sounds in the acoustic range. Unlike the ordinary acoustic fibers which terminate on the neural limbus, the infrasonic ones terminate on cells on the free basilar membrane. Furthermore, infrasonic fibers terminate on 2 – 9 hair cells while normal acoustic fibers connect to only one. Such characteristics would make these fibers analogous to fibers connecting to the outer hair cells in mammals, except that mammalian outer hair cells are known to have efferent fibers only and no afferents. These observations suggest that the infrasound sensitive fibers are in a class separate from ordinary acoustic fibers.
