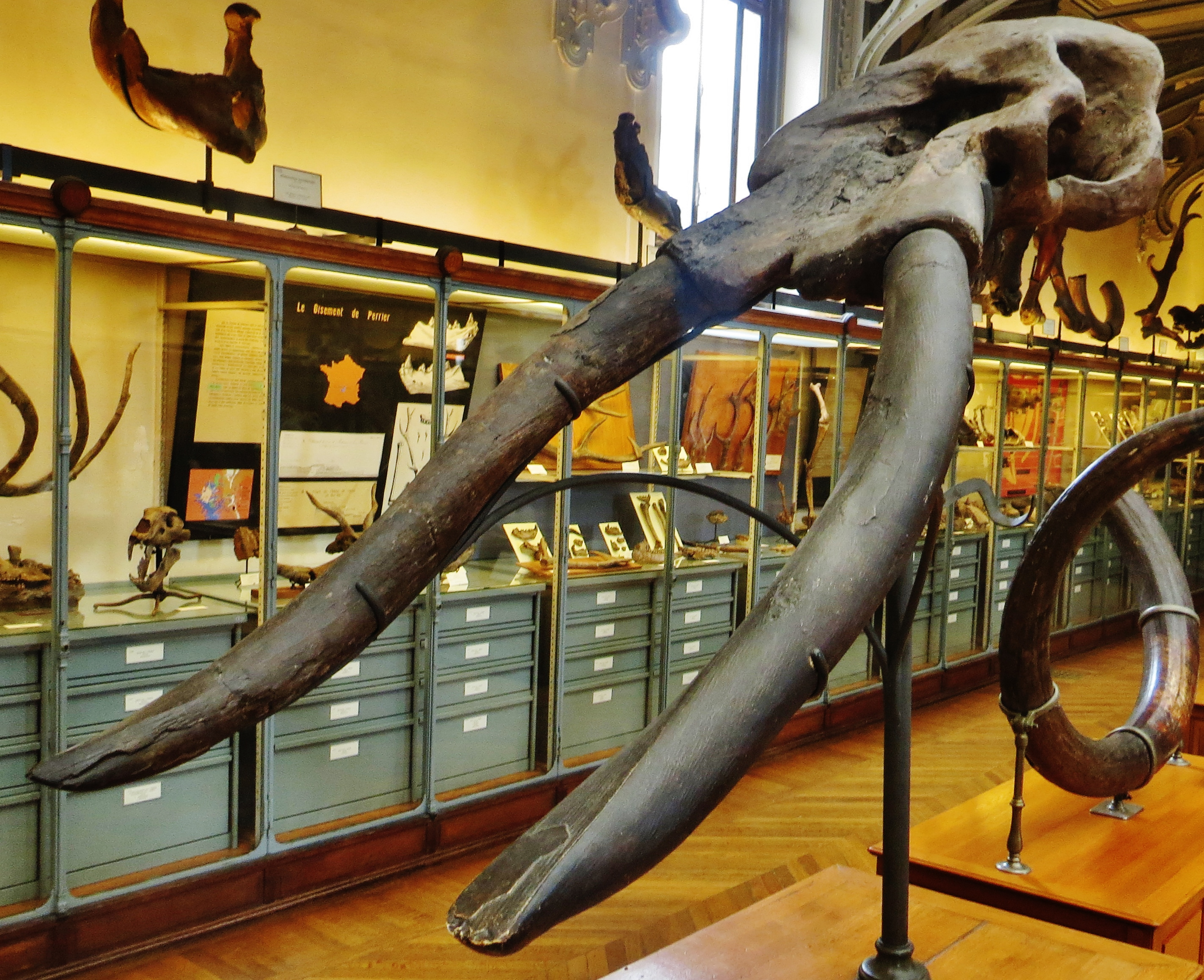
- Skull of Cuvieronius hyodon Muséum National d'Histoire Naturelle, Paris
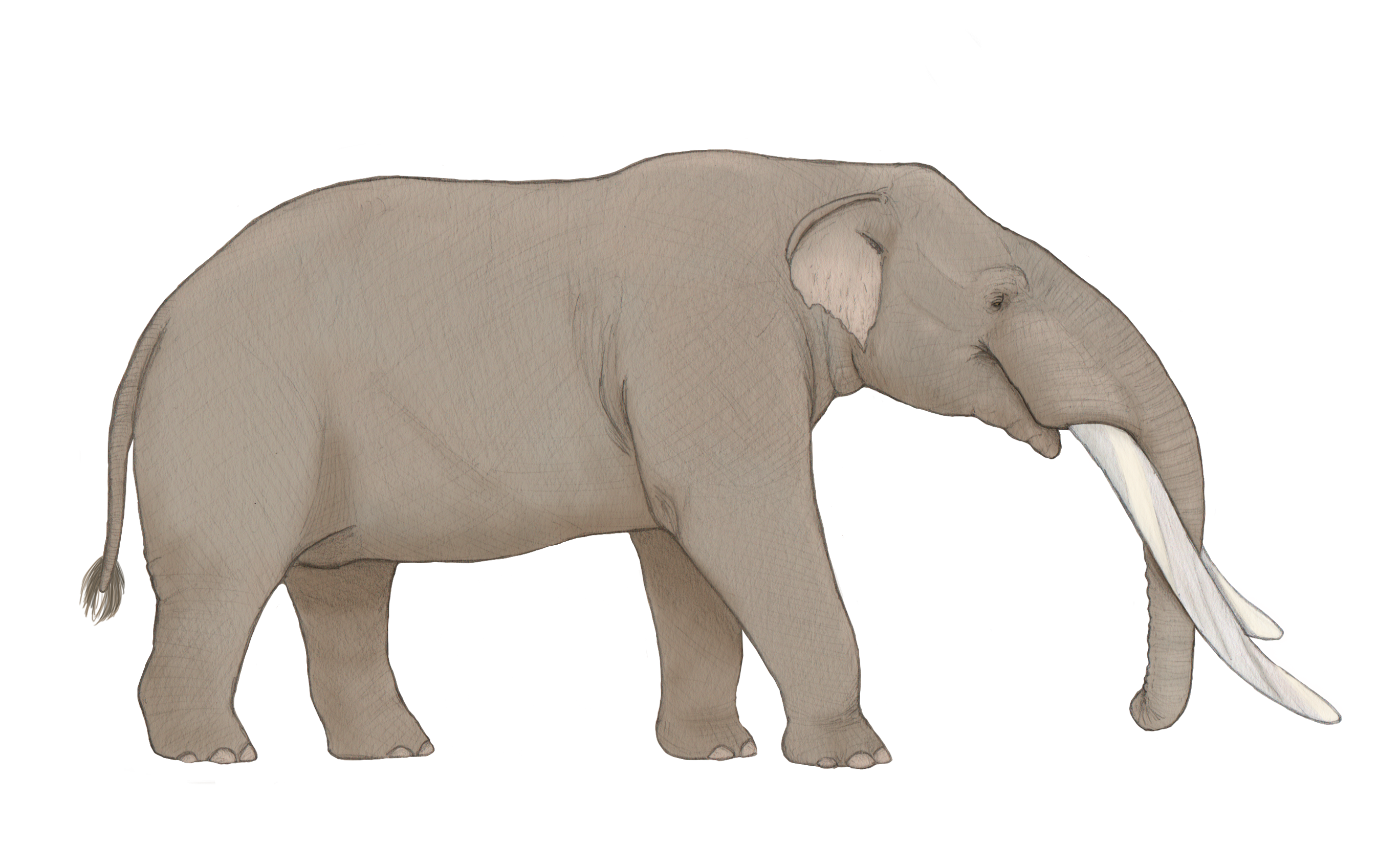
- Life restoration of Cuvieronius hyodon

Scientific classification
- Kingdom: Animalia
- Phylum: Chordata
- Class: Mammalia
- Order: Proboscidea
- Family: †Gomphotheriidae
- Genus: †Cuvieronius; Osborn, 1923
- Species: †C. hyodon

Binomial name
- †Cuvieronius hyodon (Fischer, 1814) (conserved name)

Synonyms
- C. hyodon: C. arellanoi Ochoterena & Silva-Bárcenas, 1970; C. tarijensis Ficcarelli et al., 1995; C. tropicus (Cope, 1884); C. oligobunis (Cope, 1893); C. priestleyi Hay & Cook, 1930

= Cuvieronius =

Cuvieronius Temporal range: Early Pleistocene–Holocene

Extinct genus of mammals

Cuvieronius is an extinct New World genus of gomphothere which ranged from southern North America to northwestern South America during the Pleistocene epoch. Reaching a shoulder height of 2.3 m (7 ft 7 in) and a body mass of 3.5 t (7,700 lb), it was comparable in size to an Asian elephant. Cuvieronius inhabited subtropical and tropical latitudes in environments ranging from grasslands to tropical rainforest. Among the last gomphotheres along with the South American Notiomastodon, it became extinct as part of the end Pleistocene-extinction event, approximately 12–11,000 years ago, along with most other large mammals in the Americas. The extinctions followed the arrival of humans to the Americas, and evidence has been found for human hunting of Cuvieronius, which may have been a factor in its extinction.

== Taxonomy ==
Cuvieronius hyodon was among the first fossil animals from the New World to be studied. The first remains of this species were recovered from Ecuador by Alexander von Humboldt, at a location the local population referred to as the "Field of Giants". Humboldt recognized that, rather than being bones of giant humans as had been thought by the local population and previous Spanish colonists, they were similar to the giant elephants (Mastodons) being described from Ohio. Humboldt sent teeth that he had collected from Mexico, Ecuador, and Chile to French anatomist Georges Cuvier, who classified the teeth into two species, which he referred to as the "mastodonte des cordilières" and the "mastodonte humboldtien", in an 1806 paper. It was not until 1824 that Cuvier formally named the species. He referred both to the genus Mastodon, calling them M. andium and M. humboldtii.

Unknown to Cuvier, Fischer had, in 1814, already named the two species based on Cuvier's original description, in the new genus Mastotherium as M. hyodon and M. humboldtii. The idea of two distinct species continued to be accepted into the 20th century, usually using Cuvier's names, though Fischer's names were older. In 1923, Henry Fairfield Osborn recognized these species were distinct from Mastodon, and assigned each to its own new genus, Cuvieronius humboldtii and Cordillerion andium, with the name Cuvieronius in honour of Cuvier. However, by the 1930s, general agreement had shifted to regard both forms as representing a single, geographically widespread species, with Cuvieronius humboldtii considered to be the correct name.

During the 1950s, the nomenclature of this species became increasingly tangled, as various scientists regarded the type species of the genus Cuvieronius to be Fischer's first published name Mastotherium hyodon, rather than the originally designated Mastodon humboldtii. This situation went unaddressed until 2009, when Spencer Lucas petitioned the International Commission on Zoological Nomenclature to officially change the type species of Cuvieronius to M. hyodon as had been followed for over 50 years by that time, rather than abandoning the well-known Cuvieronius as a synonym, as well as to designate the specimen MNHN TAR 1270, a skull and lower jaw from Tarija, Bolivia, as the neotype specimen of the genus/species. In 2011, Opinion 2276 of the ICZN ruled to conserve the names.

The species level taxonomy of Cuvieronius is confused. Historically, several species were recognised, typically C. tropicus and C. hyodon for North and South American remains, respectively, but recent scholarship generally suggests that there is only a single valid pan-American species, C. hyodon. A 2026 study suggested reviving C. tropicus however.

== Description ==
Estimated size of Cuvieronius hyodon compared to humans

Alive, specimens typically stood about 2.3 m (7 ft 7 in) tall at the shoulder, and weighed about 3.5 t (7,700 lb), making it around the same size as an Asian elephant. The skull was relatively long and low-vaulted. The upper tusks were straight to slightly curved, and had a spiral shaped-enamel band, and reached considerable size, with tusks in the region of 2.2 m (7 ft 3 in) in length and weights in excess of 50 kilograms (110 lb). The lower tusks present in more primitive gomphotheres were vestigial in Cuvieronius, being only present in young juveniles, and the lower jaw shortened (brevirostrine). The third molars typically had 4 to 4.5 lophs/lophids, with some specimens having 5 lophs/lophids, with relatively simple crowns. The limb bones are very robust, even compared to other gomphotheres, likely corresponding with its relatively low body mass.

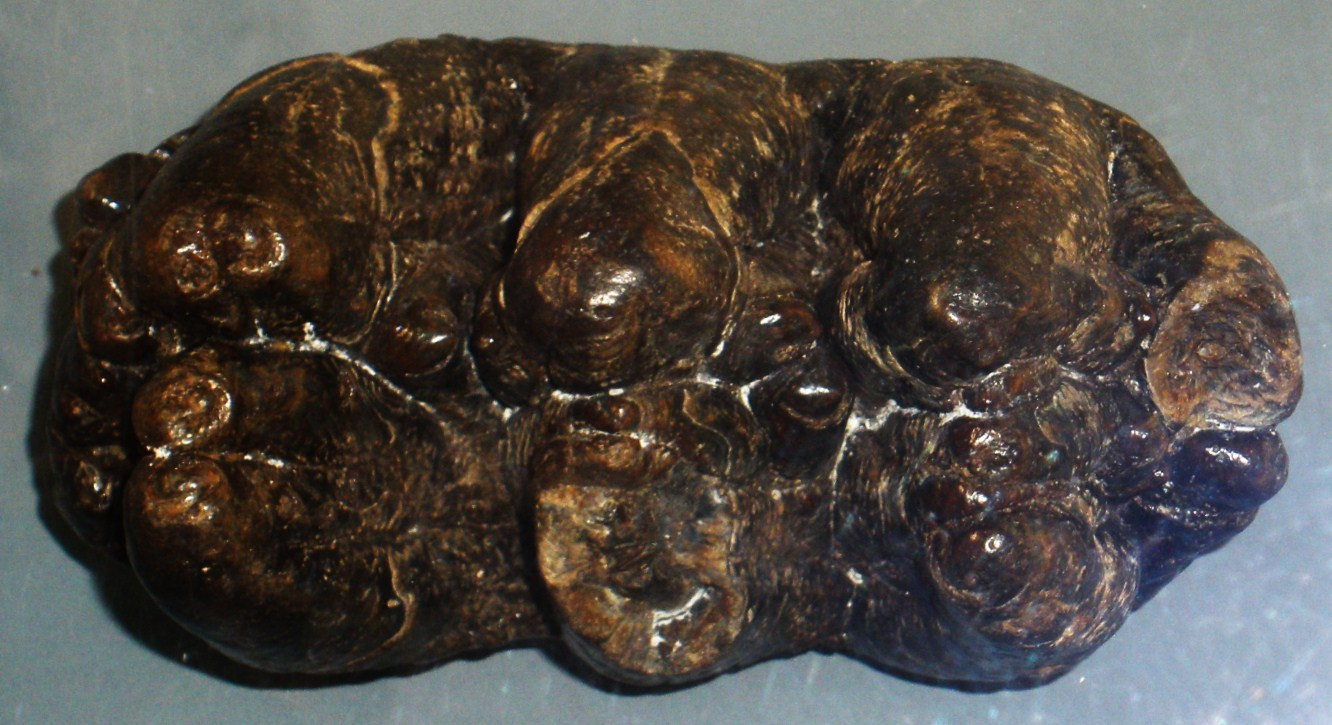
Largely unworn molar tooth

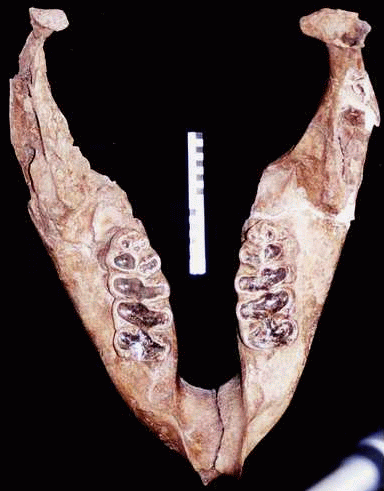
Lower jaw with worn molars

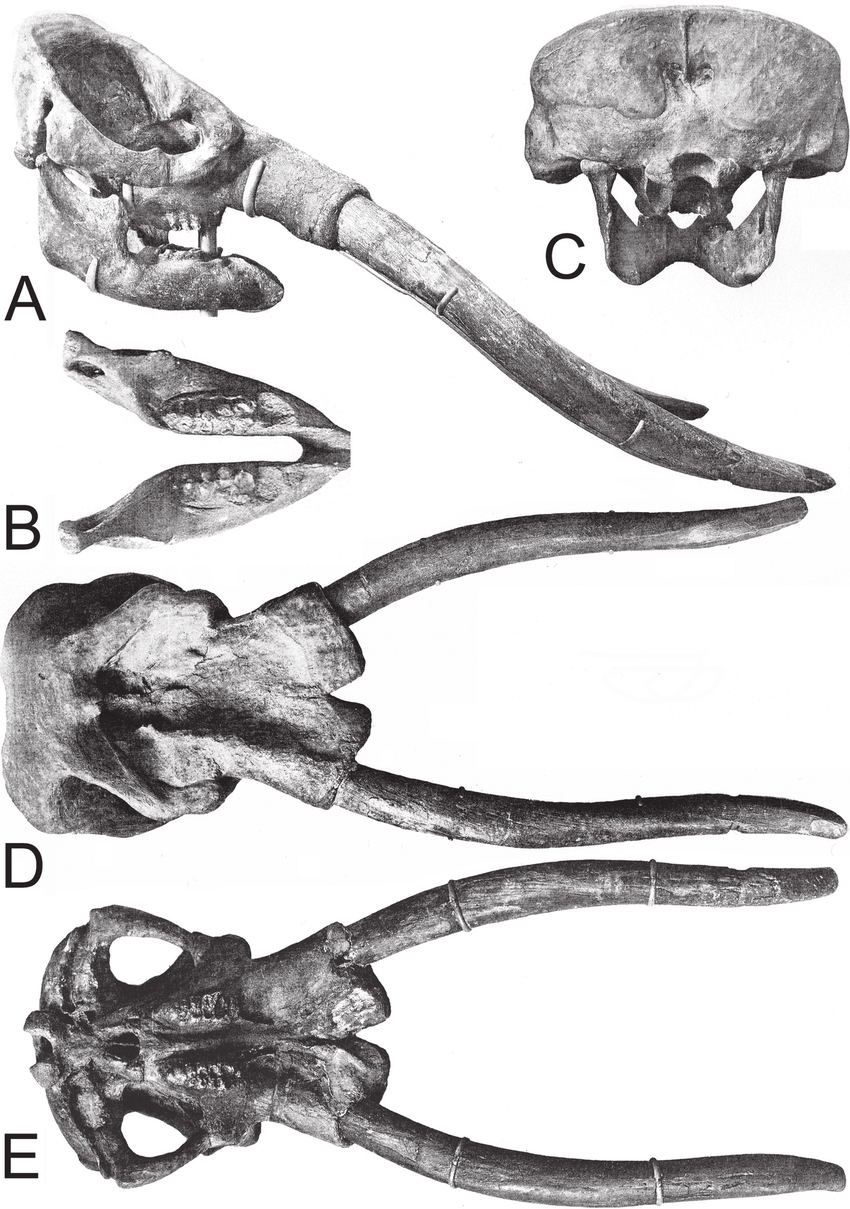
Skull and jaws of the neotype specimen of Cuvieronius hyodon (MNHN TAR 1270) in various views including side-on (A), in top-down view (D) and from below (E)

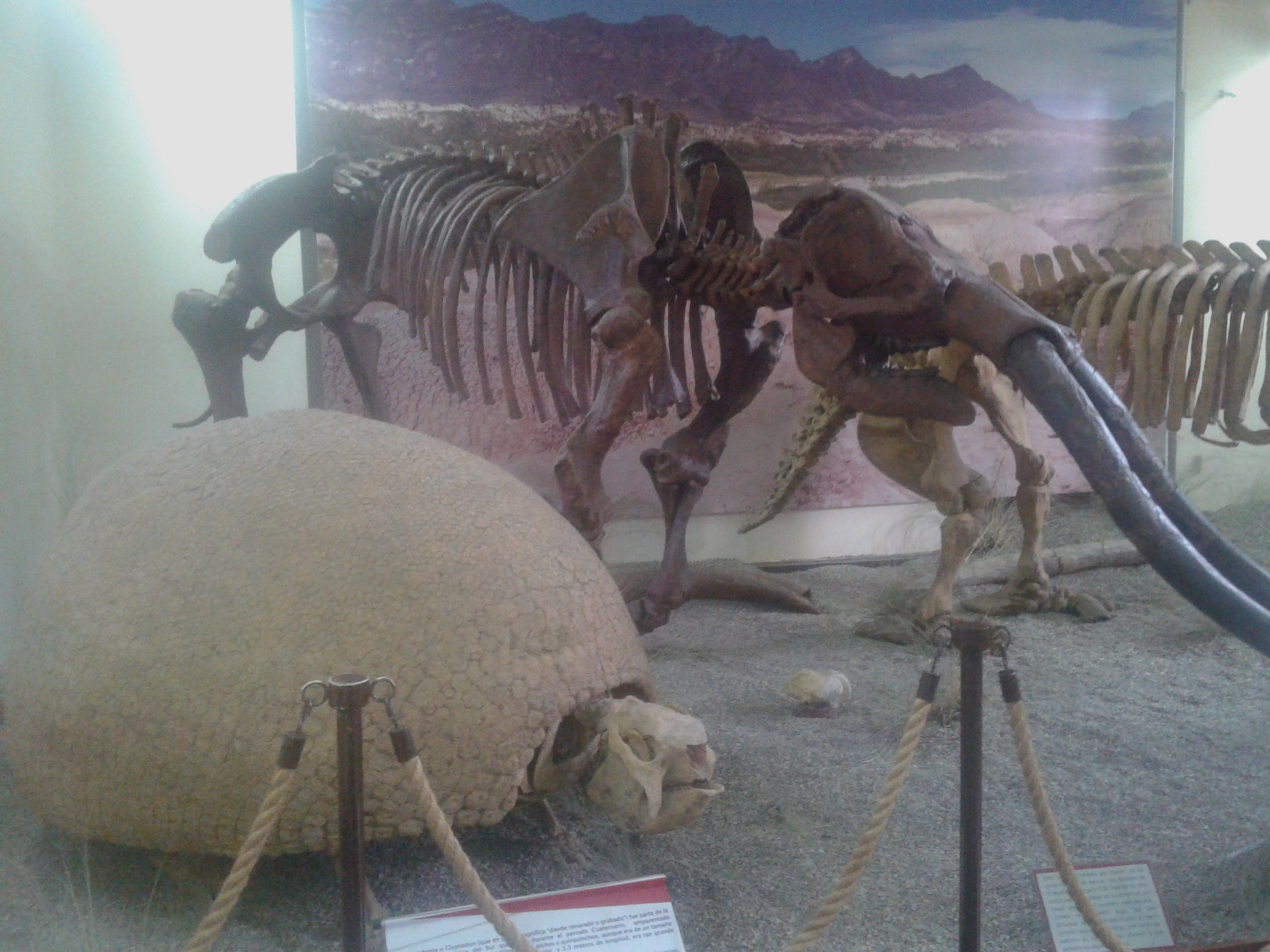
Skeleton of Cuvieronius on display in Bolivia, with a glyptodont in the foreground

== Evolution ==
Like other American gomphotheres, Cuvieronius is thought to have ultimately descended from a population of Gomphotherium that crossed the Bering Land Bridge from Eurasia during the Middle Miocene, around 16 million years ago. It is considered closely related to, if not derived from, Rhynchotherium, a North American gomphothere genus known from the Late Miocene and Pliocene. Cuvieronius initially evolved in North America. Some authors have suggested that the genus first appeared around 2 million years ago, with its earliest fossils found in Florida, while other authors suggest the earliest unambiguous appearance of Cuvieronius in the fossil record in North America dates to somewhat later, around 1.4 million years ago (Ma). An early record has been reported from the Barranca del Sisimico Local Fauna of El Salvador, dating to 1.5 Ma.

Cuvieronius became rarer in its northern range in North America over the course of the Irvingtonian after the arrival of the Columbian mammoth in North America around 1.3 Ma, presumably due to competitive exclusion by Columbian mammoths as well as mastodons, but persisted in southern North America (including Mexico, Texas and Florida) and Central America until the very end of the Pleistocene. During the Great American Interchange, Cuvieronius and a relative, Notiomastodon, dispersed into South America. The oldest possible record of Cuvieronius in South America dates to 760,000 ±30,000 years ago and the oldest confirmed date being 304,000 ±54,000 years ago. Some authors have proposed that Notiomastodon evolved directly from Cuvieronius, though this view is not accepted by others.

== Distribution and habitat ==
Cuvieronius inhabited tropical and subtropical latitudes, in environments spanning from savanna and grassland in northern Mexico, open gallery forest in Guatemala, tropical rainforest in Costa Rica, and the arid cool-temperate Andes mountains in northwest South America. It spanned altitudes from 90 metres (300 ft) below current sea level on the continental shelf (but which during the Pleistocene was periodically exposed as dry land) near the Pearl Islands of what is now Panama, to at least 3,880 metres (12,730 ft) above current sea level in the Bolivian Andes.

In North America, Cuvieronius is known from the southern and southwestern United States with remains reported (spanning from the Early Pleistocene to Late Pleistocene) from North and South Carolina, Texas, Florida, Arizona, New Mexico and Oklahoma, as well as across Mexico. Fossils of Cuvieronius are widespread across Central America. By the Late Pleistocene it had become considerably rarer and/or locally extinct/extirpated across much of the northern part of its North American range, and remains found near the town of Hockley in Texas near Houston, which date to around 24,000 years Before Present (BP), are the most recent findings north of Mexico.

Many gomphothere remains in South America historically referred to Cuvieronius actually refer to Notiomastodon, with many previous studies simply labeling fossils one or the other depending on location. Considering only localities definitely identified as Cuvieronius, the range of Cuvieronius in South America is now considered to span the northern part of the Andes from Ecuador in the north, to Bolivia in the south, across both lowland and highland environments, with the localities in the southern Andes in Chile and Argentina now thought to belong to Notiomastodon.

== Ecology ==
Cuvieronius is suggested to have been a generalist mixed feeder that consumed a wide range of plant resources, including grasses and browse (the leaves and twigs of plants like trees and shrubs). Costa Rican C. hyodon were specialised forest inhabitants that primarily fed on C_{3} plants. In 1982, Daniel H. Janzen and Paul Schultz Martin suggested that the diet of Cuvieronius probably included fruit, and that it was likely an important seed disperser of a variety of Neotropical plants with large fleshy fruits similar to those consumed by large animals in Africa, but which lack effective living native seed dispersers, which they described as "Pleistocene anachronisms". Cuvieronius may have lived in herds, similar to modern elephants.

Cuvieronius frequently co-occurred alongside other megafauna species, such as the similarly sized elephantine giant ground sloth Eremotherium, the car-sized glyptodont Glyptotherium, and the rhinoceros-like ungulate Mixotoxodon.

== Extinction ==
Cuvieronius was extirpated from South America by the end of the Late Pleistocene, with its youngest dates on the continent being around 44,000 years ago, before the arrival of people. Cuvieronius became extinct in southern North America and Central America at the end of the Pleistocene, approximately 12,000 years ago as part of the end-Pleistocene extinction event, simultaneously alongside most other large animals across the Americas. The extinction of Cuvieronius and other megafauna postdates human arrival in the Americas, which occurred several thousand years prior. At the El Fin del Mundo kill site in Sonora, Mexico, remains of an individual of Cuvieronius and another indeterminate gomphothere were found associated with Clovis spear points, suggesting that hunting may have played a role in its extinction. The site was initially suggested to date to 13,390 years Before Present, however this date was later contested, and the site may be younger than this. Some authors suggest that the species may have survived into the early Holocene in Central America, based on a molar and tusk from the La Estanzuela site in southern-central Guatemala that have been radiocarbon dated to 11,206–11,163 years Before Present (9,256–9,213 calibrated years BC), and 11,067–10,743 years Before Present (9,117–8,793 calibrated years BC) respectively, though this dating is based on enamel tooth apatite, which is more prone to date-altering contamination than dates based on collagen.
