= Blancotherium =

Blancotherium Temporal range: Clarendonian ~12–10 Ma

Scientific classification
- Kingdom: Animalia
- Phylum: Chordata
- Class: Mammalia
- Order: Proboscidea
- Family: †Gomphotheriidae
- Genus: †Blancotherium; May, 2019

Type species
- †Blancotherium buckneri (Sellards, 1940)

Extinct genus of mammals

Blancotherium (meaning "Blanco Creek beast") is an extinct genus of gomphotheriid proboscidean from Texas. Originally named Gnathabelodon "buckneri", the genus consists solely of type species B. buckneri.

== Etymology ==
Blancotherium's generic name is derived from Blanco Creek, Texas, and the Greek thērion "beast", "animal". The specific epithet is named for the Buckner Ranch, where the holotype was discovered.

== Description ==
Blancotherium is known a wide variety of cranial remains, including two skulls (TMM 30896-390 and TMM 30896-570), two isolated lower tusks (TMM 30896-530 and TMN 30896-526). and several mandibular fragments. The tusks are long and laterally compressed, curving gently upward. They lack an enamel band and do not spiral. The lower tusks are small and oval-shaped, and in contrast to the upper tusks, possess enamel bands. Mandibles from the most mature known individuals have elongated symphyses, and evidence that they had lower tusks is ambiguous. The shape of the mandibles varies, but they generally possessed long, narrow symphyses. Some specimens suggest the anterior end of the symphysis is bilobed in structure. The intermediate molars are trilophodont in structure, while the third molars commonly exhibit four well-developed ridges, with a smaller fifth ridge and a posterior heel, which consists of 2–3 conules. The molars are primarily hypsodont, and include conules in the valleys between the primary ridges.

== Paleoecology ==
The fauna and flora of the Lapara Creek locality, which Blancotherium is known from are consistent with the other localities within the Clarendonian North American Stage. This suggests a mixed woodland-grassland environment situated on a broad floodplain with a number of rivers.
