= Eritreum =

Eritreum Temporal range: Late Oligocene 28–26 Ma

Scientific classification
- Domain: Eukaryota
- Kingdom: Animalia
- Phylum: Chordata
- Class: Mammalia
- Order: Proboscidea
- Genus: †Eritreum; Shoshani et al., 2006
- Species: †E. melakeghebrekristosi

Binomial name
- †Eritreum melakeghebrekristosi Shoshani et al., 2006

Extinct species of mammal

Eritreum melakeghebrekristosi is an extinct species of proboscidean mammal, which lived in Northeast Africa during the late Oligocene some 27 million years ago, and is considered to be the missing link between modern elephants and their ancestors. The fossils of this species are the oldest known fossils featuring the horizontal tooth displacement seen in modern elephants. The species is estimated to have weighed 484 kg (1,067 lb) and stood about 1.3 m (4.3 ft) at the shoulder, much smaller than modern species.

The generic name Eritreum comes from Eritrea, the country in the Horn of Africa where the specimen was discovered. The specific name melakeghebrekristosi honors Melake Ghebrekristos, the farmer who found the specimen.
