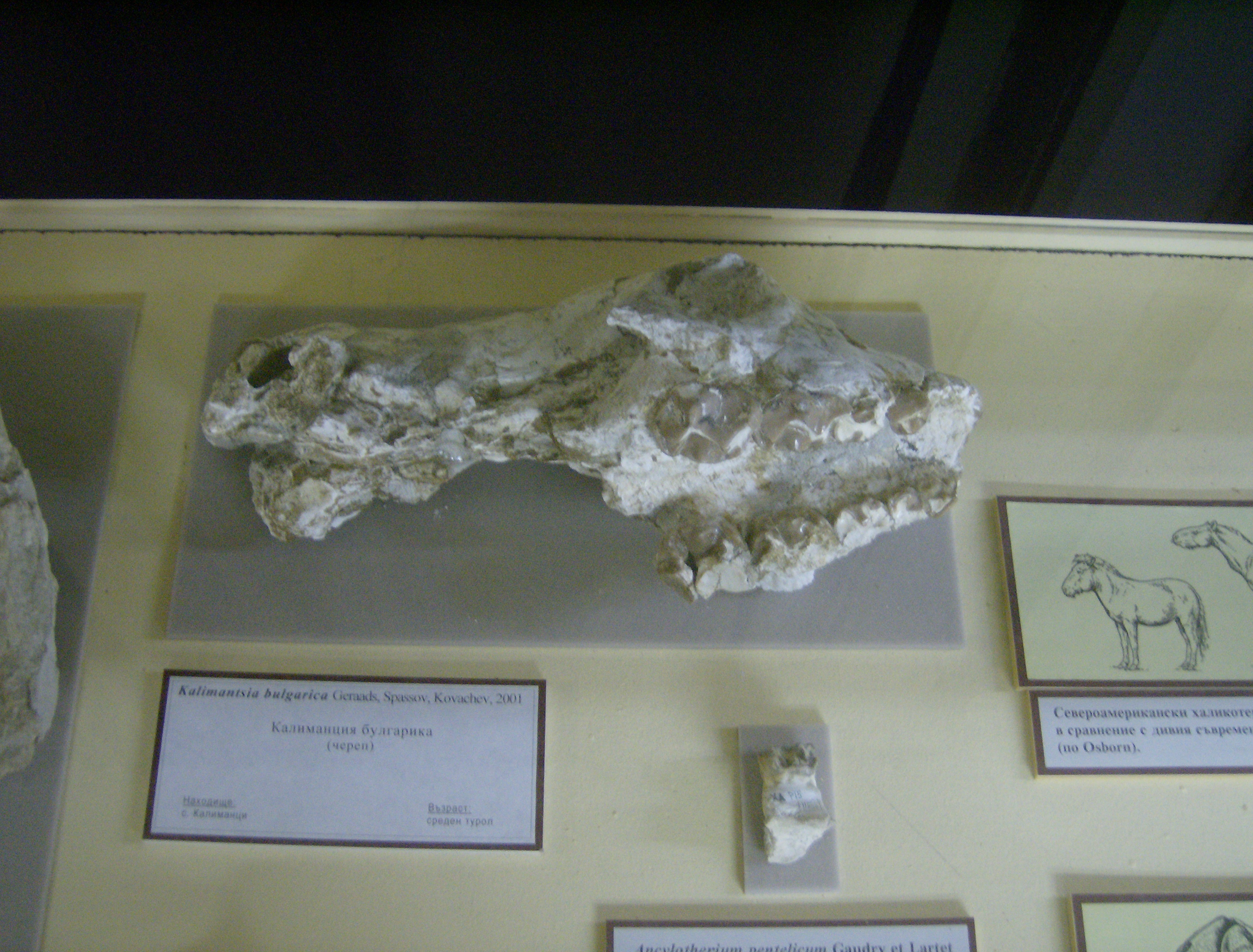
- Kalimantsia bulgarica, Asenovgrad Paleontological Museum
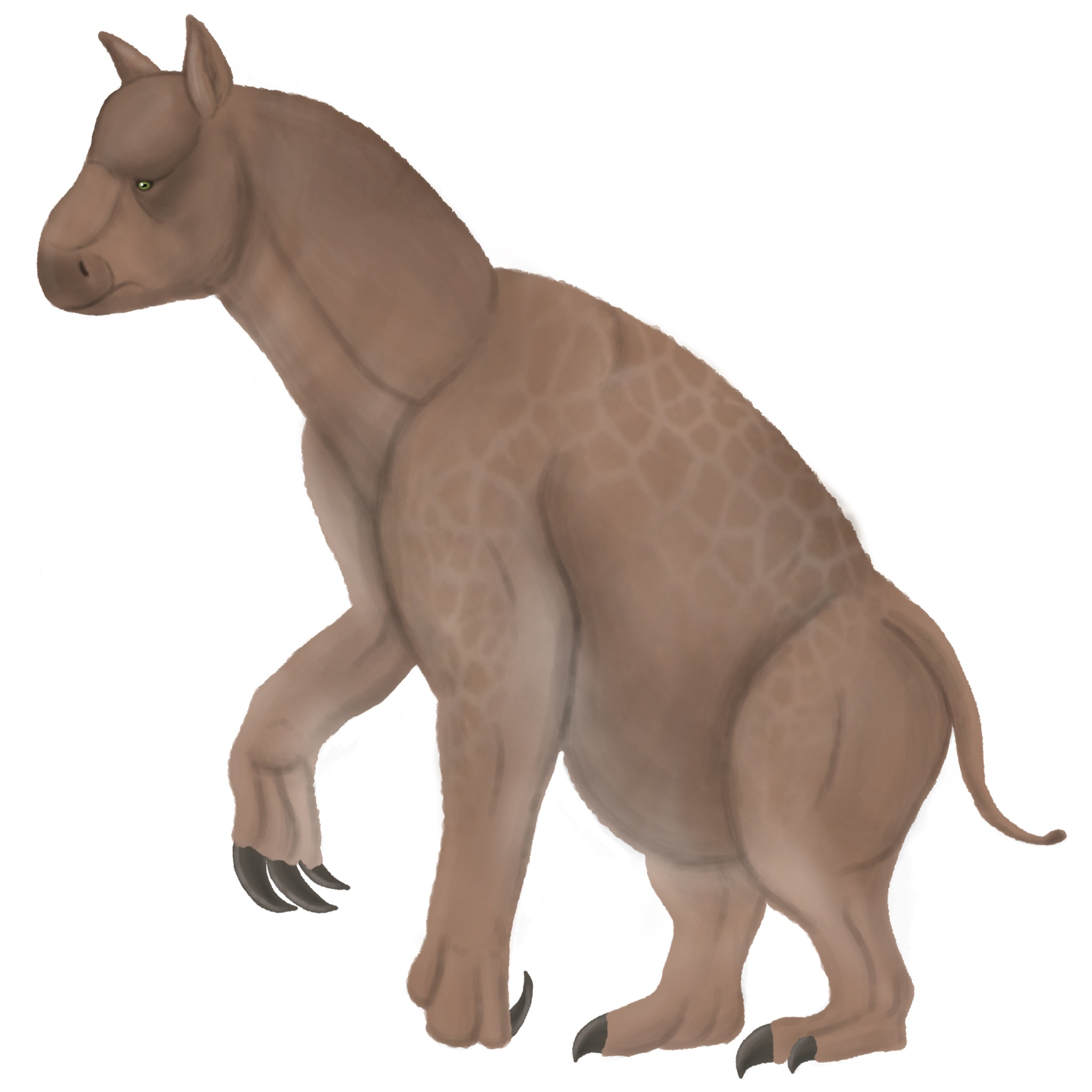
- Life restoration of Kalimantsia bulgarica

Scientific classification
- Kingdom: Animalia
- Phylum: Chordata
- Class: Mammalia
- Order: Perissodactyla
- Family: †Chalicotheriidae
- Subfamily: †Chalicotheriinae
- Genus: †Kalimantsia; Geraads, Spassov & Kovachev, 2001
- Species: †K. bulgarica

Binomial name
- †Kalimantsia bulgarica Geraads, Spassov & Kovachev, 2001

= Kalimantsia =

Kalimantsia Temporal range: 23.03–5.33 Ma Miocene

Miocene chalicothere

Kalimantsia is an extinct chalicothere from the Miocene of Bulgaria, Europe. It contains one species, Kalimantsia bulgarica.

== Description ==
Kalimantsia is named for the area in which it was discovered in 2001 by Geraads, Spassov, and Kovachev. The habitat would have been quite open and the remains of Kalimantsia are accompanied by those of horses, early deer, and various carnivorous mammals. Kalimantsia has a shorter muzzle than the horse-like shapes of the rest of the chalicotheres. The teeth of Kalimantsia are long and low, and well adapted for eating leaves.

== Size ==
- 3 m (10 ft.)

== Lifestyle ==
- Browser

== See also ==
- Tylocephalonyx - Another genus of chalicothere that also has a domed head.
