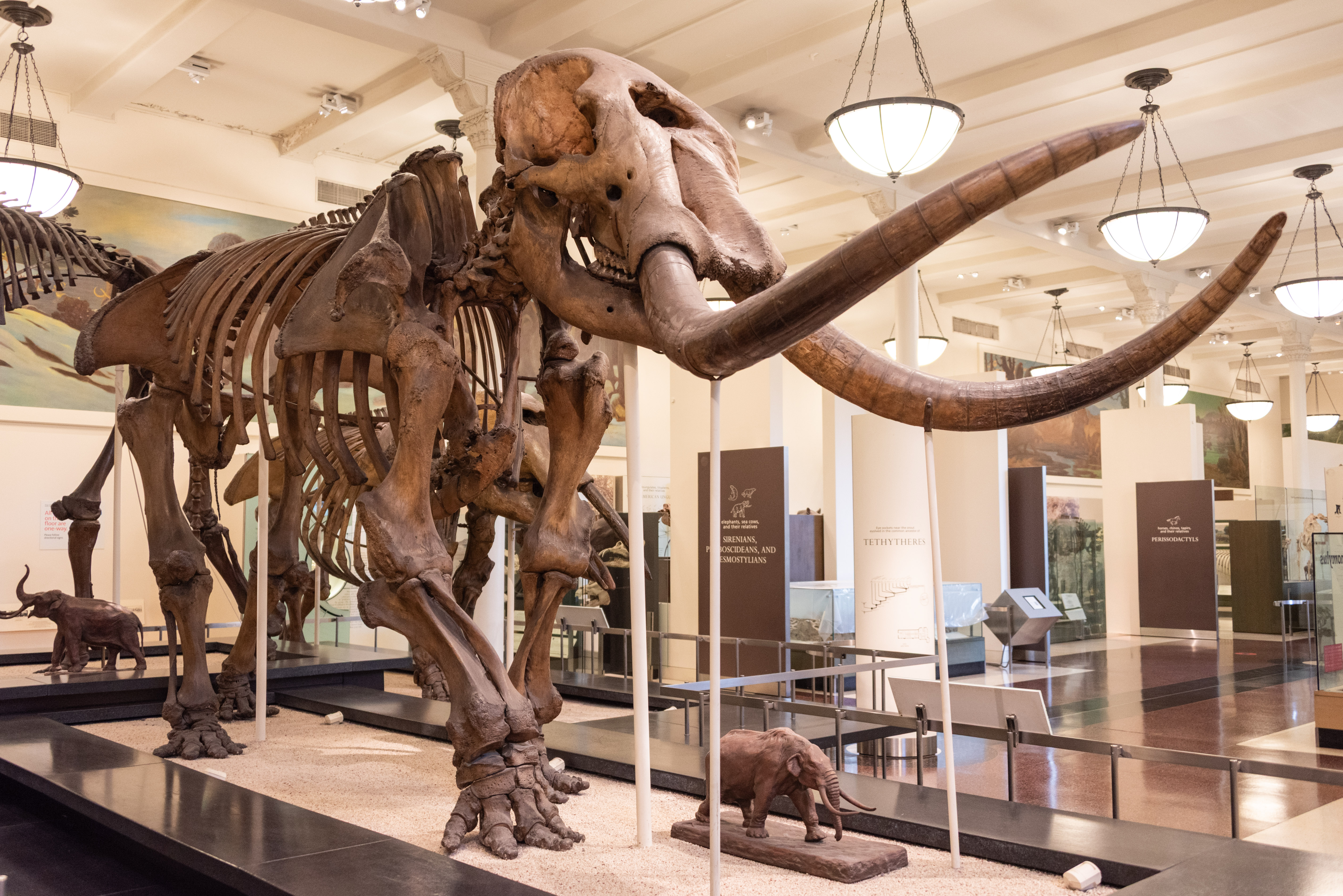
- Mounted M. americanum skeleton ("Warren mastodon"), American Museum of Natural History

Scientific classification
- Kingdom: Animalia
- Phylum: Chordata
- Class: Mammalia
- Order: Proboscidea
- Family: †Mammutidae
- Genus: †Mammut; Blumenbach, 1799

Type species
- †Elephas americanus (= †Mammut americanum) Kerr, 1792

Other species
- †M. matthewi Osborn, 1921; †M. vexillarius Matthew, 1930; †M. raki Frick, 1933; †M. nevadanum Stock, 1936; †M. cosoensis Schultz, 1937; †M? furlongi Shotwell & Russell, 1963; †M. pacificum Dooley et al., 2019; Species pending reassessment: †M. borsoni Hays, 1834; †M. shansienseChow & Chang, 1961; †M. obliquelophus Mucha, 1980; †M. lufugense Zhang, 1982; †M. zhupengensis Zhang et al., 1991

Synonyms
- Genus synonymy: Harpagmotherium Fischer von Waldheim, 1808; Mastotherium Fischer von Waldheim, 1814; Mastodon Cuvier, 1817; Tetracaulodon Godman, 1830; Missourium Koch, 1840; Leviathan Koch, 1841; Pliomastodon Osborn, 1926; Synonyms of M. americanum: Elephas americanus Kerr, 1792; Mammut ohioticum Blumenbach, 1799; Elephas macrocephalus Camper, 1802; Harpagmotherium canadense Fischer de Waldheim, 1808; Elephas mastodontus Barton, 1810; Mastotherium megalodon Fischer de Waldheim, 1814; Tapirus mastodontoides Harlan, 1825; Tetracaulodon mastodontoideum Godman, 1830; Mastodon ohioticum Eichwald, 1832; Mastodon cuvieri Hays, 1834; Mastodon jeffersoni Hays, 1834; Tetracaulodon collinsii Hays, 1834; Tetracaulodon godmani Hays, 1834; Tetracaulodon tapyroides Hays, 1834; Elephas ohioticus de Blainville, 1839–1864; Missourium kochii Koch, 1840; Leviathan missourii Koch, 1840; Tetracaulodon osagii Koch, 1841; Tetracaulodon kochii Koch, 1841; Tetracaulodon bucklandii Grant, 1842; Missourium theristocaulodon Koch, 1843; Mastodon rugatum Koch, 1845; Elephas rupertianus Richardson, 1854; Trilophodon ohioticus Falconer, 1868; Mammut progenium Hay, 1914; Mastodon americanus plicatus Osborn, 1926; Mammut oregonense Hay, 1926; Mastodon moodiei Barbour, 1931; Mastodon americanus alaskensis Frick, 1933; Mastodon acutidens Osborn, 1936; Synonyms of M. matthewi: Mastodon matthewi Osborn, 1921; Pliomastodon sellardsi Simpson, 1930; Pliomastodon adamsi Hibbard, 1944; Synonyms of M. vexillarius: Pliomastodon vexillarius Matthew, 1930; Synonyms of M. raki: Mastodon raki Frick, 1933; Synonyms of M. nevadanum: Pliomastodon nevadanus Stock, 1936; Synonyms of M. cosoensis: Pliomastodon cosoensis Schultz, 1937; Synonyms of "M." borsoni: Mastodon vellavus Aymard, 1847; Mastodon vialleti Aymard, 1847; Mastodon buffonis Pomel, 1848; Mastodon affinis Pomel, 1859; Zygolophodon borsoni Osborn, 1926; Mastodon pavlowi Osborn, 1936; Synonyms of "M." obliquelophus: M. praetypicum? Schlesinger, 1917

= Mastodon =

Mastodon Temporal range: 8–0.012 Ma Late Miocene - Younger Dryas

Extinct genus of proboscideans

A mastodon (from Ancient Greek μαστός (mastós) 'breast' and ὀδούς (odoús) 'tooth') is a member of the genus Mammut (German for 'mammoth'), which was endemic to North America and lived from the late Miocene to the early Holocene. Mastodons belong to the order Proboscidea, the same order as elephants and mammoths (which belong to the family Elephantidae). Mammut is the type genus of the extinct family Mammutidae, which diverged from the ancestors of modern elephants at least 28 million years ago, during the Oligocene.

Like other members of Mammutidae, the molar teeth of mastodons have zygodont morphology (where parallel pairs of cusps are merged into sharp ridges), which strongly differ from those of elephantids. In comparison to its likely ancestor Zygolophodon, Mammut is characterized by particularly long and upward curving upper tusks, reduced or absent tusks on the lower jaw, as well as the shortening of the mandibular symphysis (the frontmost part of the lower jaw), the latter two traits also having evolved in parallel separately in elephantids. Mastodons had an overall stockier skeletal build, a lower-domed skull, and a longer tail compared to elephantids. Fully grown male M. americanum are thought to have been 275–305 cm (9.02–10.01 ft) at shoulder height and from 6.8 to 9.2 t (6.7 to 9.1 long tons; 7.5 to 10.1 short tons) in body mass on average. The size estimates suggest that American mastodon males were on average heavier than any living elephant species; they were typically larger than Asian elephants and African forest elephants of both sexes but shorter than male African bush elephants.

M. americanum, known as an "American mastodon" or simply "mastodon", had a long and complex paleontological history spanning all the way back to 1705 when the first fossils were uncovered from Claverack, New York, in the American colonies. Because of the uniquely shaped molars with no modern analogues in terms of large animals, the species caught wide attention of European researchers and influential Americans before and after the American Revolution to the point of, according to American historians Paul Semonin and Keith Stewart Thomson, bolstering American nationalism and contributing to a greater understanding of extinctions. Taxonomically, it was first recognized as a distinct species by Robert Kerr in 1792 then classified to its own genus Mammut by Johann Friedrich Blumenbach in 1799, thus making it amongst the first fossil mammal genera to be erected with undisputed taxonomic authority. The genus served as a wastebasket taxon for proboscidean species with superficially similar molar teeth morphologies but today includes 7 definite species, 1 of questionable affinities, and 4 other species from Eurasia that are pending reassessments to other genera.

Mastodons are considered to have had a predominantly browsing-based diet on leaves, fruits, and woody parts of plants. This allowed mastodons to niche partition with other members of Proboscidea in North America, like gomphotheres and the Columbian mammoth, who had shifted to mixed feeding or grazing by the late Neogene-Quaternary. It is thought that mastodon behaviors were not much different from that of elephants and mammoths, with females and juveniles living in herds and adult males living largely solitary lives plus entering phases of aggression similar to the musth exhibited by modern male elephants. Mammut achieved maximum species diversity in the Pliocene, though the genus is known from abundant fossil evidence in the Late Pleistocene.

Mastodons for at least a few thousand years prior to their extinction coexisted with Paleoindians, who were the first humans to have inhabited North America. Evidence has been found that Paleoindians (including those of the Clovis culture) hunted mastodons based on the finding of mastodon remains with cut marks and/or with lithic artifacts.

Mastodons disappeared along with many other North American animals, including most of its largest animals (megafauna), as part of the end-Pleistocene extinction event around the end of the Late Pleistocene-early Holocene, the causes typically being attributed to human hunting, severe climatic phases like the Younger Dryas, or some combination of the two. Today, the American mastodon is one of the most well-known fossil species in both academic research and public perception, the result of its inclusion in American popular culture.

== Taxonomy ==
=== Research history ===
==== Earliest finds ====
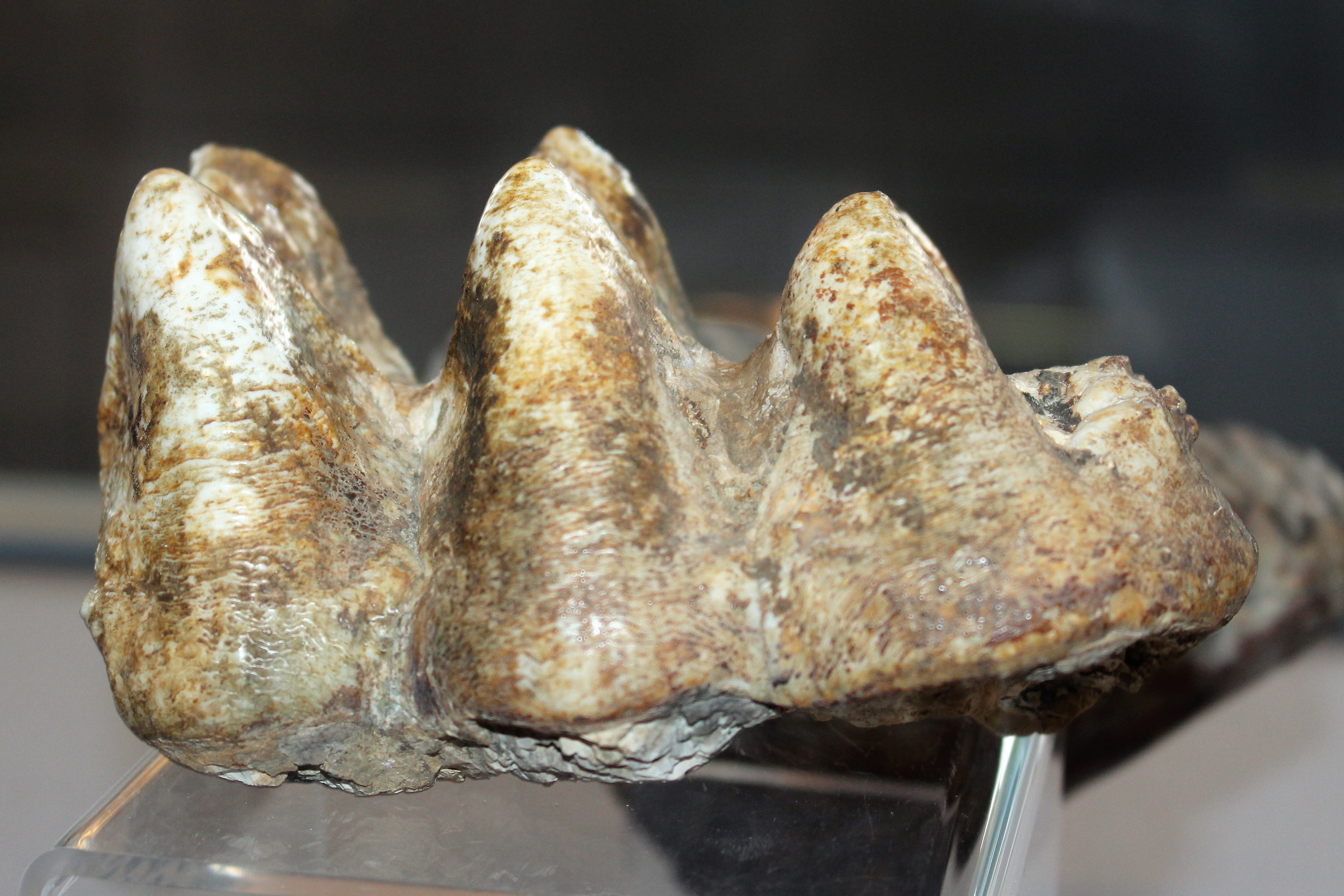
Mammut americanum molar tooth, Rotunda Museum

In a letter dating to 1713, Edward Hyde, 3rd Earl of Clarendon (known also as Lord Cornbury), from New York reported to the Royal Society learned society of Great Britain that in 1705, a large-sized tooth was found near the side of the Hudson River by a Dutch country-fellow and was sold to New York General Assembly member Van Bruggen for a gill of rum, and Bruggen eventually gave it to Cornbury. He then stated that he sent Johannis Abeel, a recorder of Albany, New York to dig near the original site of the tooth to find more bones.

Abeel reported later that he went to the town of Claverack, New York, where the original bones were found. American historian Paul Semonin said that the account written by Cornbury and Abeel match up with an article in the July 30, 1705, The Boston News-Letter. The account reported skeletal evidence of an antediluvian (or biblical) "giant" uncovered from Claverack. The femur and one of the teeth both dissolved before they could be further observed, however.

==== Big Bone Lick ====
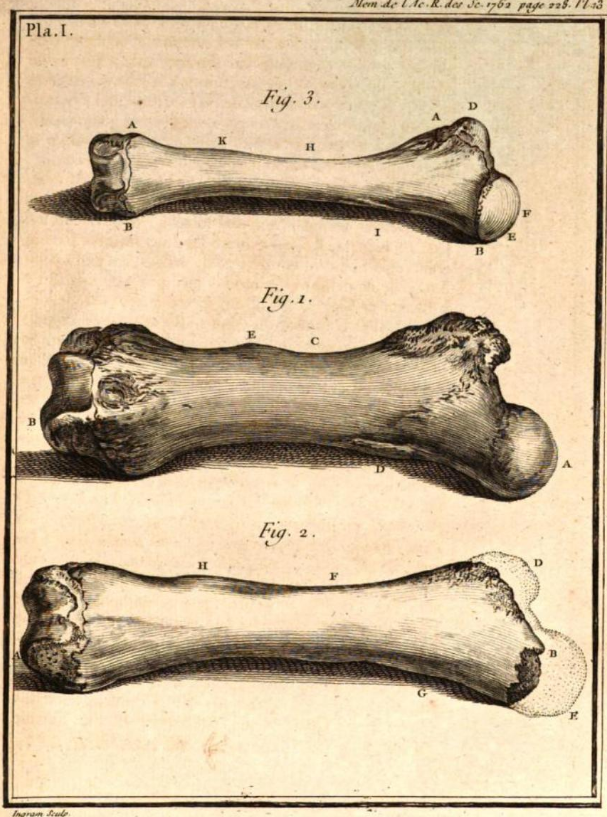
Engravings of the femurs of an unspecified extant elephant species (top), M. americanum (middle), and a "Siberian" mammoth (bottom), 1764

In 1739, a French military expedition under the command of Charles III Le Moyne (known also as "Longueil") explored the locality of "Big Bone Lick" (located in what is now the US state of Kentucky) and gathered fossil bones and teeth there. The French naturalist Louis Jean-Marie Daubenton examined the fossil collection brought by Longueuil and compared it with specimens of extant elephants and Siberian mammoths in 1762. Daubenton said that the bones were discovered by Native Americans (probably Abenaki hunter–warriors). He came to the conclusion that the femur and tusk belonged to an elephant while the molars (or cheek teeth) came from a separate giant hippopotamus.

In Shawnee tradition, the proboscideans roamed in herds and were hunted by giants, who both eventually died out. The accounts told by the Shawnee individuals in 1762 are the oldest known documented interpretations of the "Ohio" fossils, although the traditions may have had been told for generations.

In 1767, Peter Collinson credited Irish trader George Croghan for having sent him and Benjamin Franklin fossil evidence of the mysterious proboscideans, using them for his studies. He concluded that the peculiar grinders (the molars) were built for herbivorous diets of branches of trees and shrubs as well as other vegetation, a view later followed by Franklin.

In 1768, Scottish anatomist William Hunter recorded that he and his brother John Hunter observed that the teeth were not like those of modern elephants. He determined that the "grinders" from Ohio were of a carnivorous animal but believed that the tusks belonged to the same animal. After examining fossils from Franklin and Lord Shelburne, Hunter was convinced that the "pseudo-elephant", or "animal incognitum" (shortened as "incognitum"), was an animal species separate from elephants that might have also been the same as the proboscideans found in Siberia. He concluded his article with the opinion that although regrettable to philosophers, humanity should be thankful to heaven that the animal, if truly carnivorous, was extinct.

According to Bill Bryson, in 1795 the palaeontologist Georges Cuvier examined a collection of the "incognitum" bones in Paris and wrote the first formal description of the beast, calling it mastadon ("nipple-teeth") and so became its official discoverer.

==== Early American observations ====
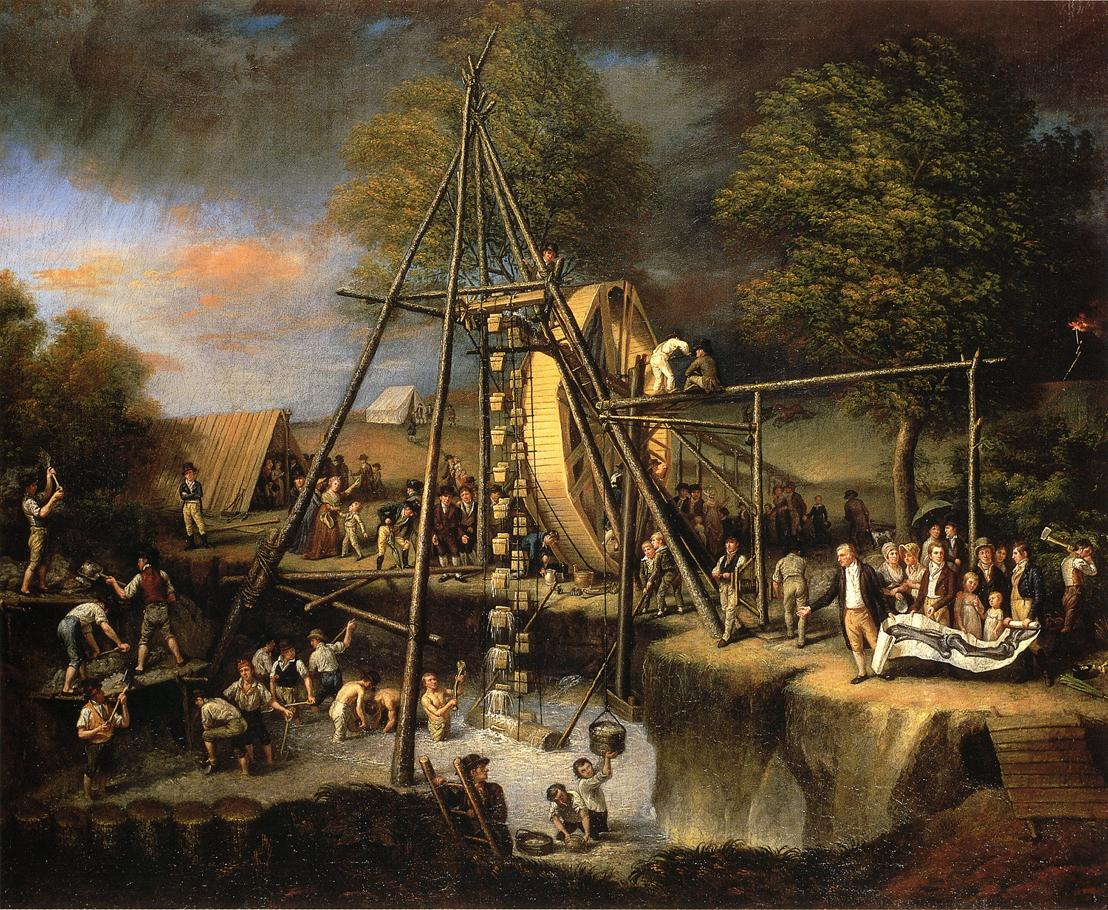
The 1806–1808 painting The Exhumation of the Mastodon by Charles Willson Peale

In 1785, Reverend Robert Annan wrote an account recalling when, in the fall of 1780, workers discovered bones on his farm in Hamptonburgh, Orange County, NY on the banks of the Wallkill River. The workers found four molars in addition to another that was broken and thrown away. They also uncovered bones, including vertebrae that broke shortly thereafter. Annan expressed his confusion at what the animal could be but speculated based on its "grinders" that it was carnivorous in diet. He speculated also that it was probably extinct due to some catastrophe within the globe.

American statesman Thomas Jefferson stated his thoughts on Notes on the State of Virginia (published by 1785) that the fossil proboscideans may have been carnivorous, still exist in the northern parts of North America, and are related to mammoths whose remains were found in Siberia. Jefferson referenced the theory of American social degeneracy by Georges-Louis Leclerc, Comte de Buffon, countering it by using extant and extinct animal measurements, including those of "mammoths," as proof that North America faunas were not "degenerative" in size. Semonin pointed out that social degeneracy was an offensive concept to Anglo-American naturalists and that the American proboscidean fossils were used as political tools to inspire American nationalism and counter against the theory of American degeneracy.

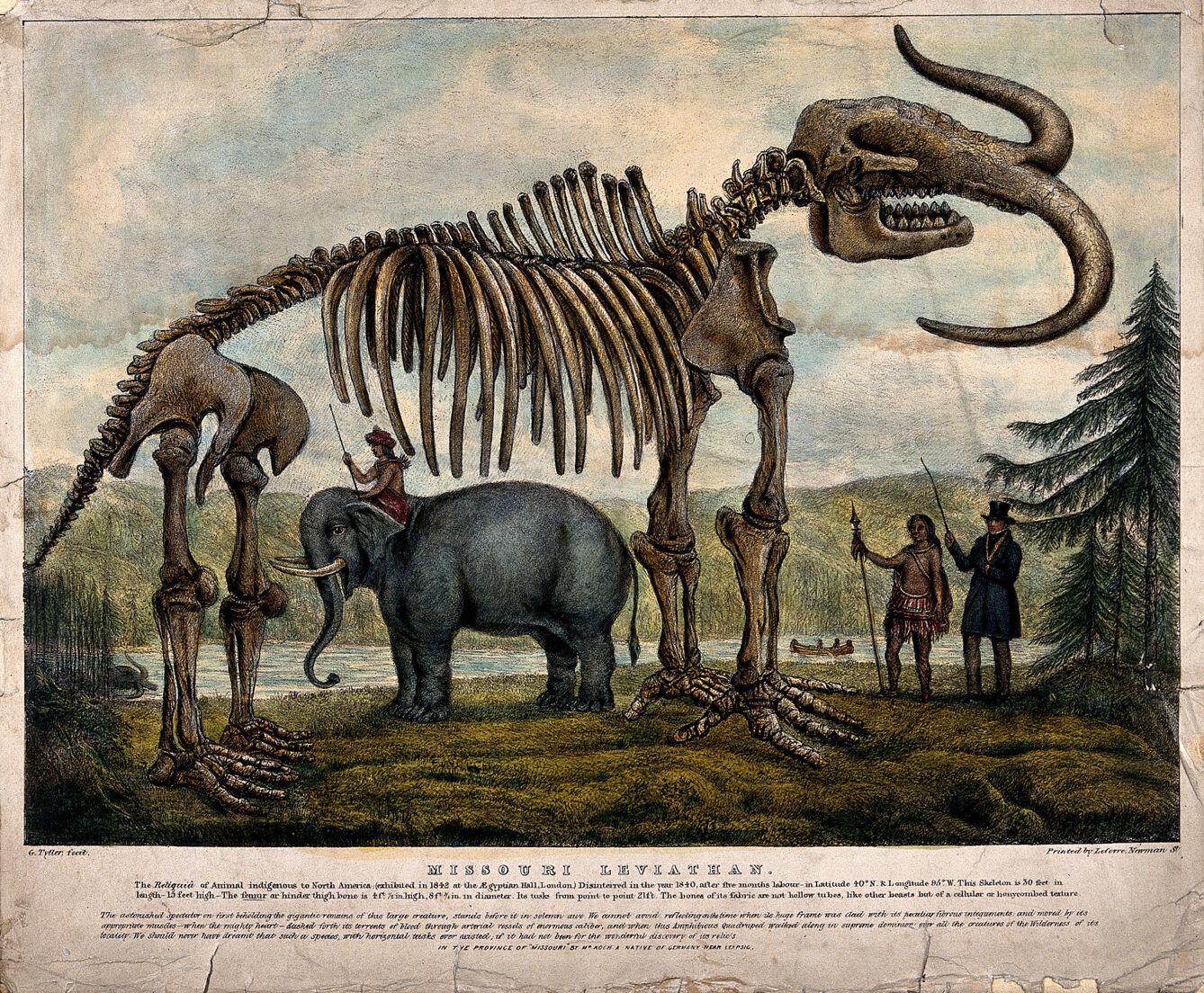
Colored lithograph of the "Missourium" (= Mammut) skeleton, c. 1845

In 1799, laborers recovered a thighbone while digging a marl pit at John Masten's farm in Newburgh, New York, and subsequent excavations were observed by a crowd of over a hundred people. American painter and exhibitionist Charles Willson Peale visited the locality in 1801, where he first sketched the fossils then purchased excavation privileges and full ownership of the fossils from Masten and obtained a loan from the American Philosophical Society (APS) in Philadelphia, Pennsylvania. In addition to the first skeleton, the second was excavated using a mill-like device to drain a 12 ft (3.7 m) deep marl pit. Peale assembled a complete skeleton in his Philadelphia Museum in 1804, and its exhibit was open first to invited members of the American Philosophical Society on December 24 then to the general public on December 25 for an exhibit admission fee in addition to the general admission fee.

The special exhibition attracted thousands of visitors, and the skeleton became a US national symbol. Charles Peale's son Rembrandt Peale took the skeleton to Europe to promote the fossil proboscidean and have it used as support for Jefferson's final rebuttals against Buffon's arguments for supposed inferiority of American faunas. It was received at the Muséum d'Histoire Naturelle in 1808, and the following year, when Jefferson's presidency ended, he acknowledged in a letter to the senior Peale that "all should agree in giving the same name to the same thing" (May 1809) regarding the European suggestion that "mastodon" replace the term "mammoth." Author Keith Stewart Thomson argued that the promotion of the "mastodon" skeleton made it a symbol of the strength of American nationalism and that "mammoth" as a term became associated with gigantism. Decades later, the museum was bankrupted, and the first skeleton's specimens were sold to some German spectators in around 1848, who eventually sold it to Hessisches Landesmuseum Darmstadt in Germany where it is now displayed. The second skeleton's specimens landed eventually at the American Museum of Natural History.

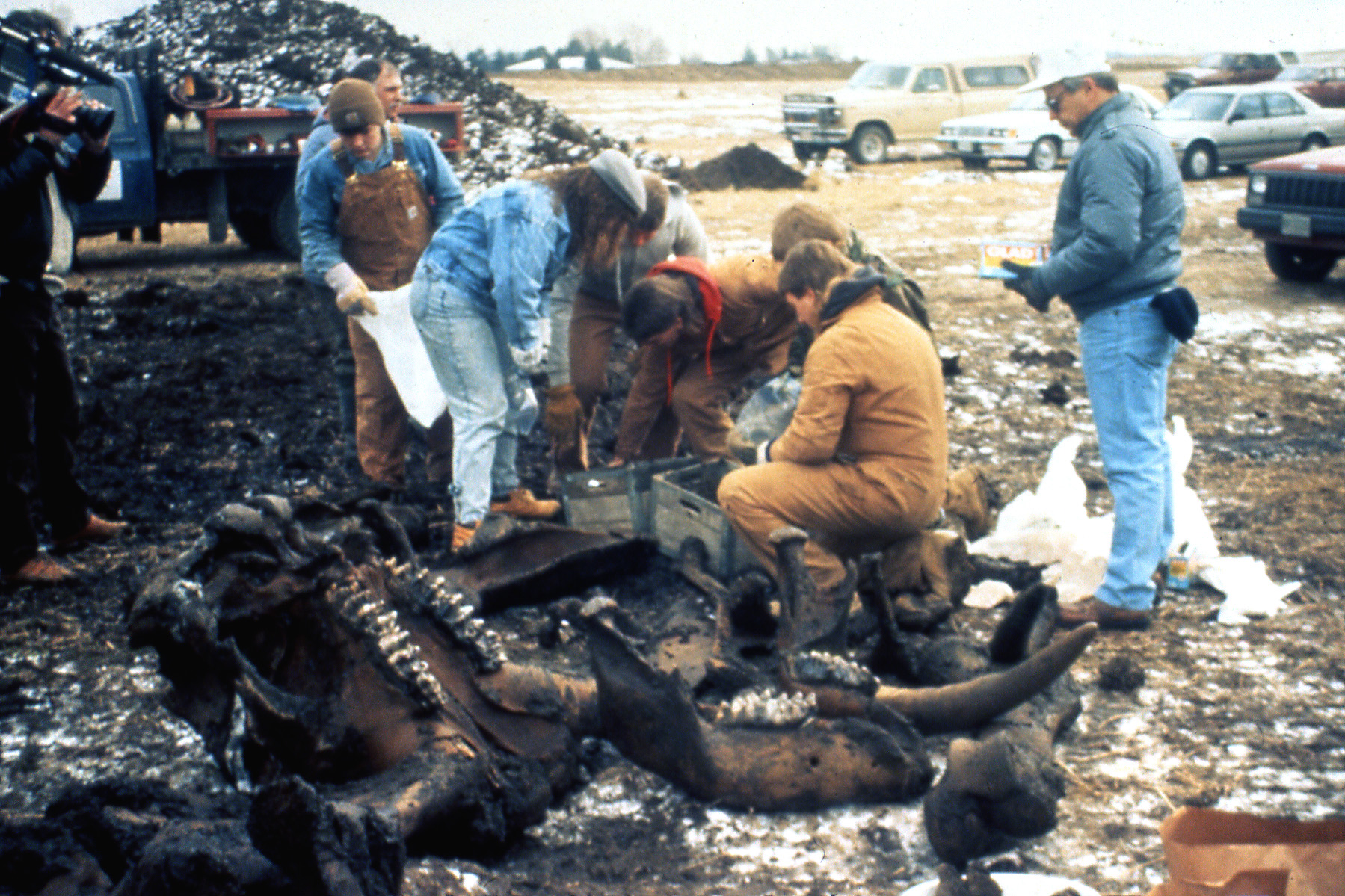
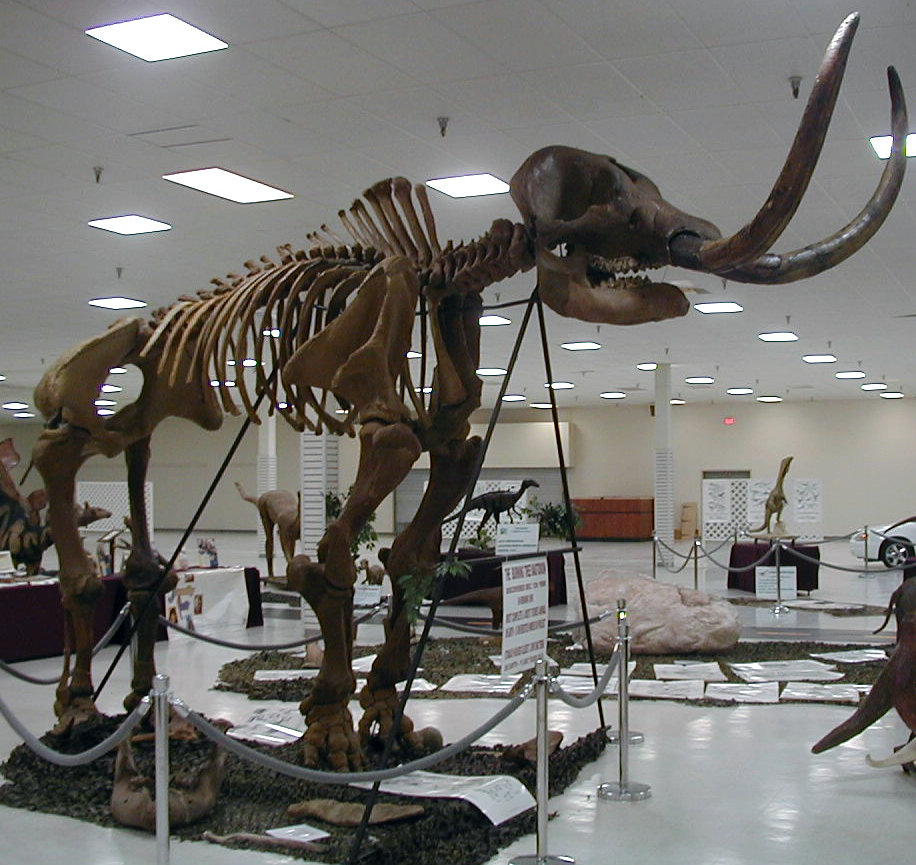
Excavation of a specimen in a golf course in Heath, Ohio, 1989 (left) and a replica of the "Burning Tree mastodon" complete skeleton (right)

Other skeletons of Mammut americanum were excavated within the United States in the first half of the 19th century. One of them was collected by American showman Albert C. Koch in what is today the Mastodon State Historic Site at Missouri in 1839. He hypothesized in 1840 that the proboscidean, which he classified as Missourium, was much larger than an elephant, had horizontal tusks plus trunks, and occupied aquatic habitats. He acquired additional fossils from a spring on the Pomme de Terre River to assemble a mounted skeleton of the "Missouri Leviathan" and briefly exhibited it at St. Louis. After exhibiting the skeleton throughout Europe, he sold the skeleton to the British Museum of Natural History. Richard Owen then properly reassembled the skeleton, and it today is on display there.

In 1845, another skeleton was excavated from Newburgh by laborers hired by Nathaniel Brewster initially to remove lacustrine deposits to fertilize the neighboring fields. They were observed by a large number of spectators and uncovered relatively complete fossil evidence of M. americanum. The skeleton was exhibited in New York City and other New England towns then was acquired by John Collins Warren for study. After Warren's death in 1856, the skeleton was sent to Warren's family but was traded to Harvard Medical School for John Warren's skeleton. The "Warren mastodon", under the request of American paleontologist Henry Fairfield Osborn, was purchased by the American financier J. P. Morgan for $30,000 in 1906 and donated to the American Museum of Natural History where it is exhibited today.

==== Early taxonomic history ====
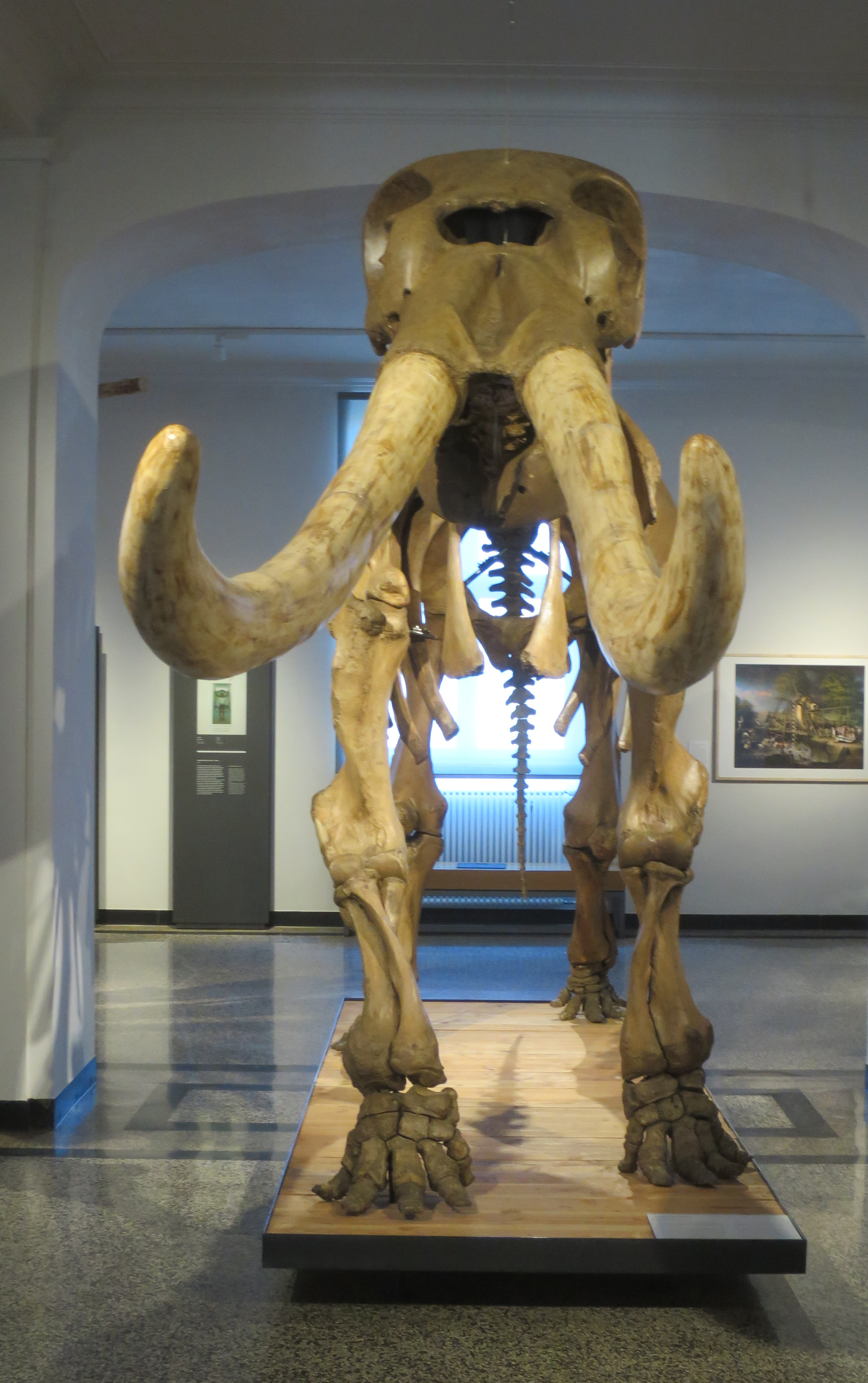
Mammut skeleton previously displayed by Charles Peale at his museum, now on display at Hessisches Landesmuseum Darmstadt

In the 1790s, the "American incognitum" was subject to research by multiple taxonomists. Scottish writer Robert Kerr erected the species name Elephas americanus in 1792 based on fossil tusks and "grinders" from the Big Bone Lick locality. He stated that the tusks were similar to elephants while the molars were completely different because they were covered with enamel and had a double row of high conical cusp processes. Kerr was unsure about the taxonomic affinities of the molars and referenced that Thomas Pennant supposed that they belong to an unknown species within the genus Elephas, giving the common name "American elephant".

German naturalist Johann Friedrich Blumenbach also followed up with more taxonomic descriptions of fossil proboscideans in 1799. The first fossil species, recovered from Germany, was described as belonging to the newly erected species Elephas primigenius? (now known as Mammuthus primigenius). The second was what he considered to be an unknown "colossal land monster of the prehistoric world," considering it to be the "mammoth." He created the genus Mammut and erected the species Mammut ohioticum based on fossil bones dug up from Ohio in North America. He said that the species was distinguished from other animals of the prehistoric world based on the unusual shapes of the large molars. The genus name "Mammut" refers to the German translation for "mammoth." The naming of the genus Mammut in 1799 makes it the second or third genus to be recognized with taxonomic authority given that Megalonyx had been named the same year.

French naturalist Georges Cuvier also described known fossil proboscidean species back in 1796, although his account was later published in 1799. He considered that the remains uncovered from Siberia were true "mammoths" that had similar dentitions to extant elephants but had some morphological differences. He mentioned the fossil remains that were brought back by Longueil from Ohio back in 1739 and several researchers from previous decades who noted the unusual molars and thought that they belonged to different animals like hippopotamuses. He followed recognition in the previously established species "Elephas americanus" and argued that the species was different from elephants and mammoths and cannot be found amongst living animals due to extinction from catastrophism.

The proboscidean species was subject to several other species names given by other taxonomists within the earliest 18th century as well as the genus name Harpagmotherium by the Russian naturalist Gotthelf Fischer von Waldheim in 1808.

==== Cuvier's taxonomy ====
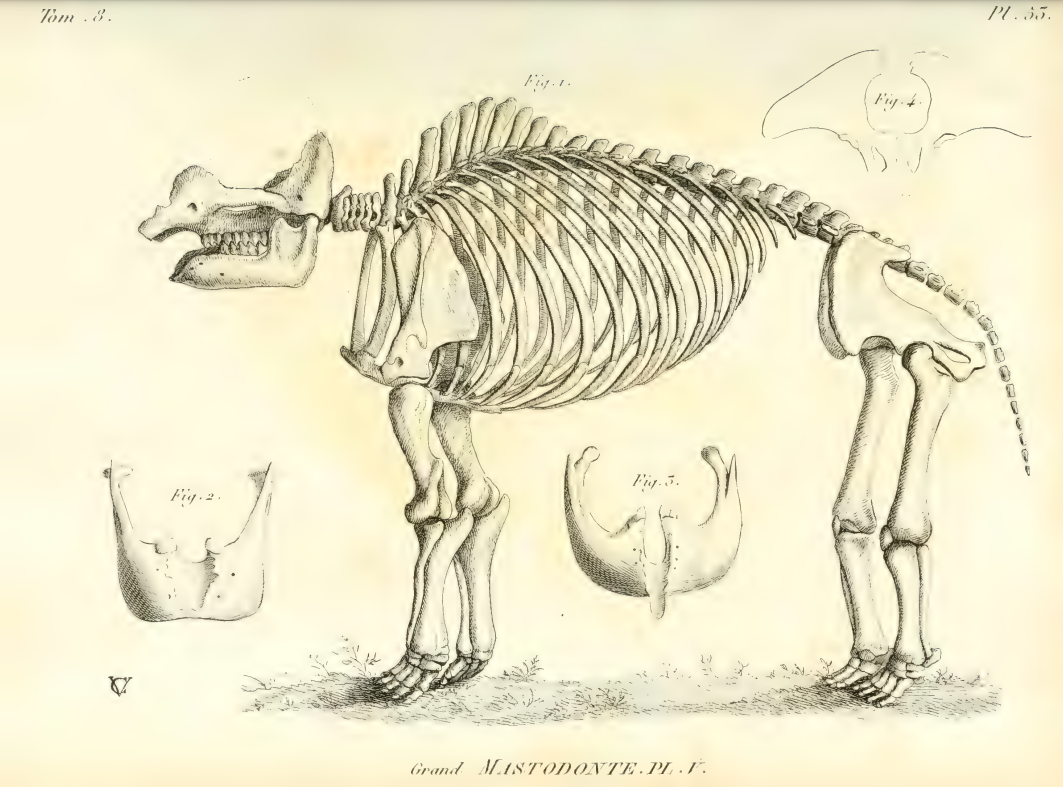
Sketch of the skeleton of Mammut, labeled as "Mastodonte"

In 1806, Cuvier wrote multiple extended research articles on fossil proboscideans of Eurasia and the Americas. He stated that the bones that Buffon previously described from North America were not of elephants but another animal that he referred to as the "mastodonte," or the "animal of Ohio." He reinforced the idea that the extinct "mastodon" was an animal close in relationship to elephants that differed by jaws with large tubercles. He suggested that "mammoth" and "carnivorous elephant" be discontinued as names for the species and that it receive a new genus name instead. Cuvier said that for "mastodonte," he derived the name's etymology (compound μαστός (mastós, "breast") + ὀδούς (odoús, "tooth")) from Ancient Greek to mean "nipple tooth," since he thought that it expressed the characteristic form of the teeth.

In 1817, the French naturalist officially established the genus name Mastodon, reaffirming that it is extinct and has left no living descendants. He established that it had an overall body form similar to elephants but had molars more similar to hippopotamuses and pigs that did not serve to grind meat. The first species he erected within Mastodon was Mastodon giganteum, giving it the informal name "great mastodon" and writing that it is designated to the Ohio proboscidean with abundant fossil evidence, equal size but greater proportions to modern elephants, and diamond-shaped points of the molars. The naturalist also created the second species name Mastodon angustidens and gave it the informal name "narrow-toothed mastodon," diagnosing it as having narrower molars, smaller sizes compared to M. giganteum, and range distributions in Europe and South America. Cuvier also erected several other species of Mastodon originating from other continents in 1824. Despite Cuvier's genus name being younger than multiple other genus names, Mastodon became the most commonly used genus name for the 19th century.

==== Taxonomic problems ====
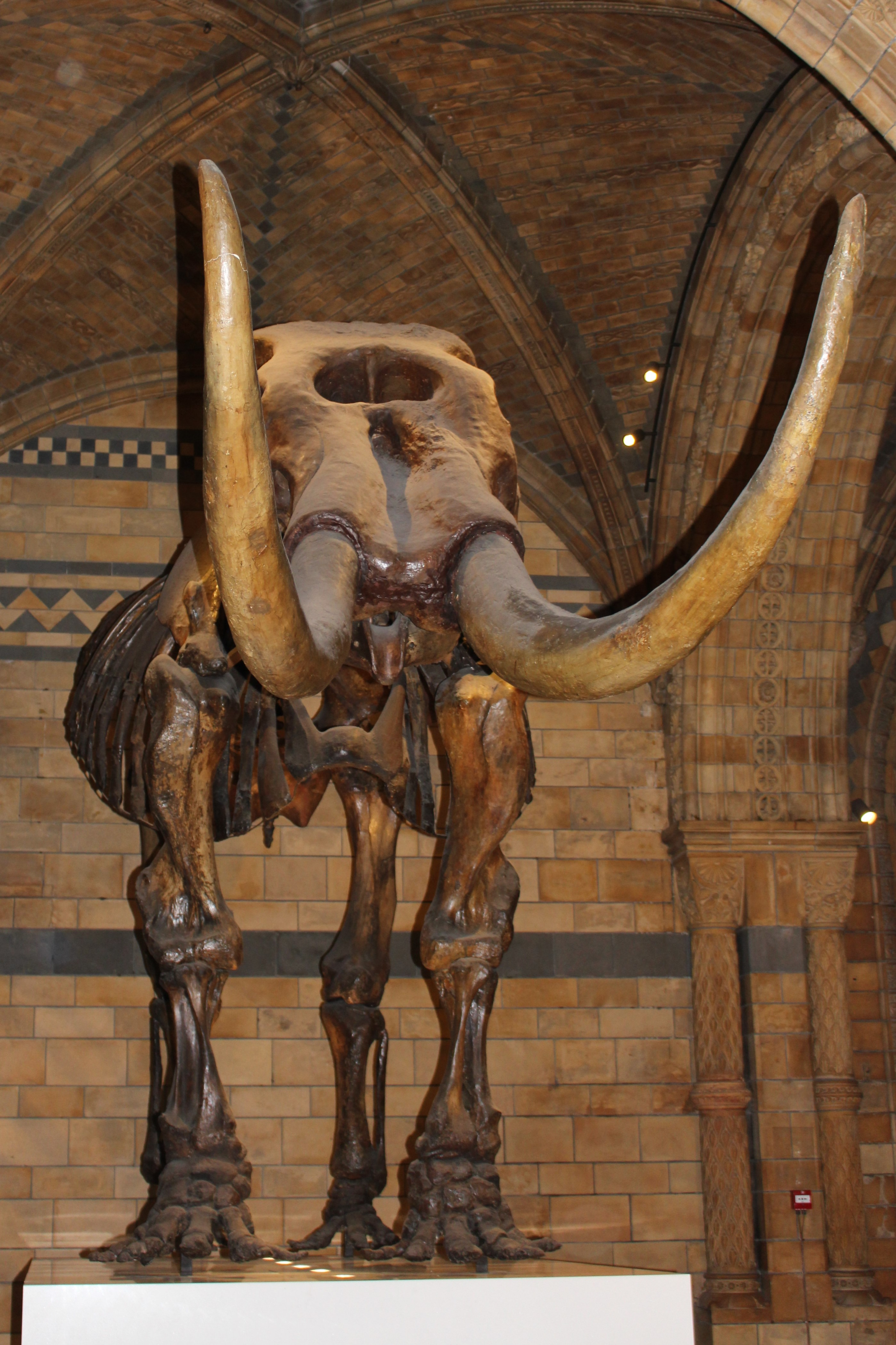
M. americanum skeleton, Natural History Museum, London. The skeleton was initially assembled by Albert C. Koch as "Missourium" or "Leviathan", both now synonymous with Mammut.

"Mastodon" was riddled with major taxonomic problems since species now determined as belonging to other proboscidean genera were classified to Mastodon on the basis of similar dentitions to that of "Mastodon giganteum" (= Mammut americanum), effectively making it a wastebasket taxon. Various fossil proboscidean species were classified into Mastodon in the 19th century before eventually being reclassified into distinct genera. In addition to still-valid species names, several synonymous or dubious species names ultimately belonging to different genera were erected within the Americas as well throughout the 19th century. Also, many species names erected based on M. americanum remains were erected. As a result, M. americanum has many synonymous names. The issue of synonymous species names were especially apparent in the first half of the 19th century.

Today, the genera that include species formerly classified into Mastodon include Gomphotherium (G. angustidens, G. pyrenaicum, G. productum, G. libycum, G. subtapiroideum, G. steinheimense), Zygolophodon (Z. turicensis, Z. proavus), Cuvieronius (C. hyodon), Stegodon (S. elephantoides), Stegolophodon (S. latidens, S. cautleyi), Anancus (A. avernensis, A. sivalensis, A. perimensis), Tetralophodon (T. longirostris), Choerolophodon (C. pentelici), Stegomastodon (S. mirificus), Rhynchotherium ("R." euhypodon), Stenobelodon (S. floridanus), and Notiomastodon (N. platensis).

In 1830, American naturalist John Davidson Godman created the genus Tetracaulodon plus its species T. Mastodontoideum based on what he determined to be differences between it and Mastodon based on the skull and dentition. Both Richard Harlan and William Cooper pointed out that except for the tusks, all other characteristics of the specimens were consistent with M. giganteum. They therefore argued that there was no reason to assume that the tusks were not just individual variations, a view followed also by George William Featherstonhaugh. Isaac Hays comparatively defended Godman's taxon, which led to a bitter debate regarding the validity of the genus amongst American naturalists.

The validities of both Tetracaulodon and Missourium were rejected by Owen in 1842, although he retained the former name informally. By 1869, American paleontologist Joseph Leidy determined that Mastodon americanus is the senior species synonym and listed M. giganteum as a junior synonym. He also listed Mammut, Harpagmotherium, Mastotherium, Missourium, and Leviathan as synonyms of Mastodon. He also noted that M. americanum as a species was highly variable in morphology.

In 1902, American paleontologist Oliver Perry Hay listed Mammut as the prioritized genus name given its status as the oldest genus name, making Mastodon, Tetracaulodon, and Missourium classified as junior synonyms. He also established M. americanum as the type species. The genus name Mastodon was subsequently abandoned by many American paleontologists in favor of Mammut within the early 20th century. In 1942, American paleontologist George Gaylord Simpson said that for his study, he prioritized the historic plus taxonomically correct name Mammut over Mastodon. He continued prioritizing Mammut in 1945, stating that people were generally aware of its taxonomic priorities over Mastodon and that people had refused to use it. He stated that he did not want to either but reluctantly set aside his personal preferences to follow taxonomic rules.

==== Additional species ====
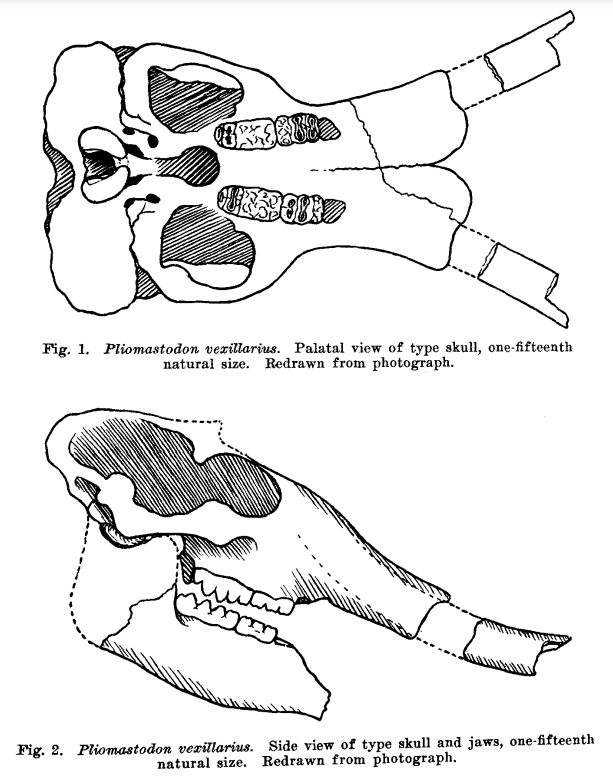
Sketch of the reconstructed skull of "Pliomastodon vexillarius" (= Mammut vexillarius), 1930

In 1921, Osborn created the species name Mastodon matthewi based on distinct molars from the Snake Creek Formation of western Nebraska, naming it in honor of William Diller Matthew. He also erected another species M. merriami from the Thousand Creek Formation in Nevada, which was eventually synonymized with Zygolophodon proavus. Osborn in 1926 followed up for Mastodon matthewi by establishing the genus Pliomastodon for the species based on cranial differences from "Miomastodon" (= Zygolophodon).

In 1930, Matthew erected a second species for Pliomastodon named P. vexillarius based on fossil material from the locality of Elephant Hill in California, determining that it differs from Mammut by differences in the skull and that the etymology of the species name was made in honor of paleontological contributions by the Standard Oil Company of California.

In 1933, Childs Frick named the species Mastodon raki from the locality of Truth or Consequences, New Mexico based on differences on the heel and M_{3} tooth from M. americanus, otherwise having proportions similar to it. In 1936, Chester Stock published the species name Pliomastodon nevadanus based on fossils from the Thousand Creek Beds of northwestern Nevada. In 1937, John R. Schultz created the species name Pliomastodon? cosoensis, naming it after the Coso Mountains in Inyo County, California where skull fossils were recovered.

In 1963, J. Arnold Shotwell and Donald E. Russell designated another species Mammut (Pliomastodon) furlongi, assigning it to fossils collected from the Juntura Formation of Oregon. The species name was created in honor of Eustace L. Furlong, who made early fossil collections from the western side of the Juntura Basin.

The genus Pliomastodon was synonymized with Mammut while Miomastodon was synonymized with Zygolophodon by Jeheskel Shoshani and Pascal Tassy in a 1996 appendix, a view that was followed by other authors in later years.

In 2019, Alton C. Dooley Jr. et al. established Mammut pacificus based on fossils collected from the Diamond Valley Lake in Hemet, California. They also stated that M. oregonense is a nomen dubium and that further analysis needs to be done to confirm whether or not M. furlongi belongs to Zygolophodon instead.

In 2023, Wighart von Koenigswald et al. reviewed the North American species of Zygolophodon and Mammut. They synonymized P. adamsi and P. sellardsi with Mammut matthewi and emended M. nevadanus and M. pacificus to M. nevadanum and M. pacificum, respectively. They also said that they were uncertain of the taxonomic status of M. furlongi, specifically whether or not it was a variant of sexual dimorphism of Z. proavus. Some authors have considered M. nevadanum to be synonymous with M. matthewi while others had retained validity of the species name.

Several mammutid species outside of North America are classified to Mammut (or "Pliomastodon"), namely M. borsoni, M. obliquelophus, M. zhupengensis, and M. lufugense (possibly synonymous with M. obliquelophus). Recent research such as that of von Koenigswald et al. in 2023 warned that the genus Mammut should be carefully used for non-North American species.

=== Classification and evolution ===
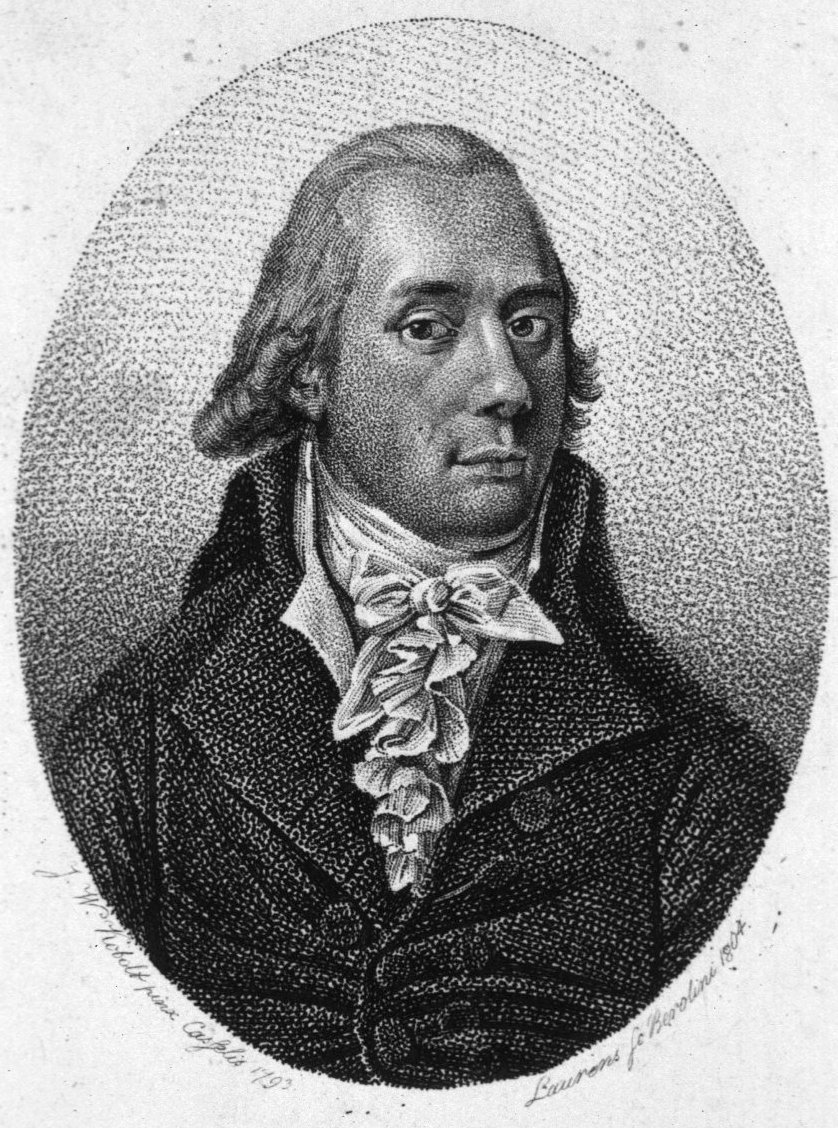
Portrait of Johann Friedrich Blumenbach, who erected the genus Mammut in 1799

Mammut is the type genus of the Mammutidae, the sole family of the elephantimorph clade Mammutida (the other elephantimorph clade is Elephantida). The Mammutidae is characterized by molars with zygodont-form crests, which have remained morphologically conservative throughout the evolutionary history of the family. Mammut is considered to be a derived genus of the family because of strong zygodont development. As a family of the Elephantimorpha clade, it is only distantly related to the Deinotheriidae due to major differences in dentition and emergence of adult teeth. The Mammutidae is identified as a monophyletic clade, meaning that it did not leave any derived descendant groups in its evolutionary history. The monophyly of the Mammutidae makes it differ from the Elephantida, where the Gomphotheriidae is paraphyletic (or ancestral to more derived descendant groups in the cladistic sense) in relation to the derived elephantoid families Stegodontidae and Elephantidae (elephants, mammoths, and relatives).

Although the separation of the Mammutida and Elephantida is strongly supported based on morphological differences, their origins within the late Paleogene remain uncertain. One hypothesis asserts that the Elephantimorpha is monophyletic if the primitive Elephantiformes genus Phiomia was truly ancestral to both the Elephantida and Mammutida. An alternate hypothesis suggests that the Elephantimorpha is diphyletic because Phiomia is ancestral to gomphotheres while Palaeomastodon is ancestral to mammutids. The earliest undisputed mammutid genus Losodokodon is recorded in Kenya, Africa and firmly establishes the earliest presence of mammutids in the late Oligocene (~27-24 Ma). The Mammutidae, like other Paleogene proboscideans, was therefore an endemic radiation within the continent akin to other endemic mammals like arsinoitheres, hyracoids, and catarrhine primates plus non-endemics such as anthracotheres and hyaenodonts.

In the early Neogene phase of evolution, Eozygodon made an appearance in the earliest Miocene (~23-20 Ma) of Africa after Losodokodon. Eozygodon was subsequently succeeded by Zygolophodon by the early Miocene, and the latter dispersed into Eurasia by around 19-18 million years ago, and into North America by the middle Miocene. The dispersal of mammutids between Africa and Eurasia may have occurred multiple times. The Mammutidae eventually went extinct in Africa prior to the late Miocene.

Mammut as currently defined sensu lato (in a broad sense) is most likely polyphyletic (comprising several unrelated groups). This is because the inclusion of Eurasian mammutid species into Mammut implies that they share a common origin with North American Mammut, but this relationship has been doubted. As a result, these Eurasian species may belong to either other existing mammutid genera or entirely new genera. "Mammut" borsoni, the last Eurasian mammutid, became extinct during the earliest Pleistocene, around 2.5-2 million years ago.

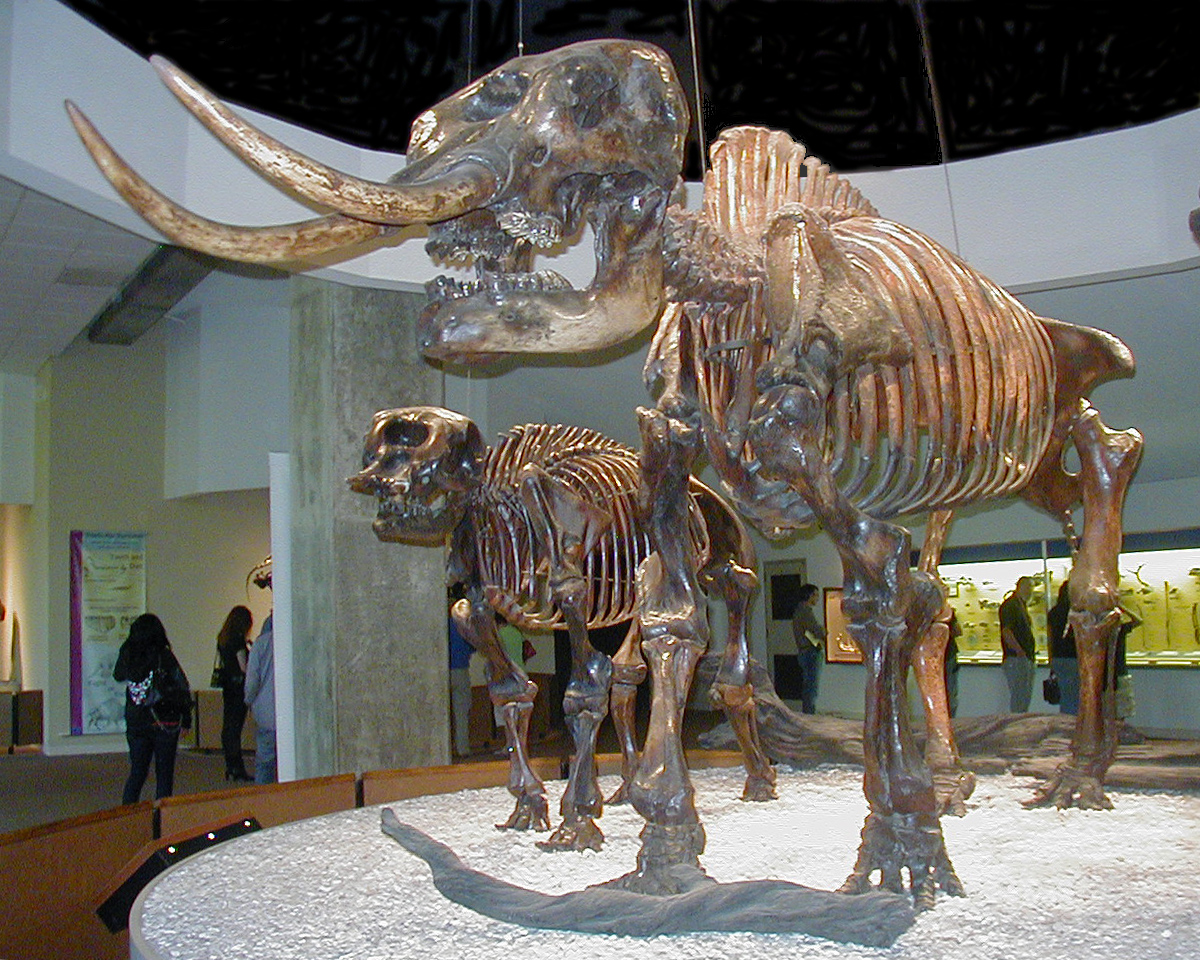
Skeletons of an adult and calf M. americanum, George C. Page Museum

The oldest evidence of mammutids in North America is of a fragmentary molar of Zygolophodon sp. from Massacre Lake, Nevada, dating to 16.5-16.4 Ma (during the Hemingfordian stage of the North American land mammal ages (NALMA)). The only definitively defined species of Zygolophodon from North America is Z. proavus, which occurs in the Barstovian and Clarendonian stages. M? furlongi from the Black Butte in Oregon also dates back to the Clarendonian stage, but the affinities of the species remains unclear. If it truly is a species of Mammut, then its earliest temporal range is recorded at about 10 Ma. The earliest undisputed appearance of Mammut is of M. nevadanum from Thousand Creek Beds, dating back to the early Hemphillian, or 8.0-7.1 Ma. Historically, North American paleontologists considered that North American Zygolophodon evolved into Mammut in an endemic fashion while European workers generally thought that Mammut was a Eurasian immigrant that replaced North American Zygolophodon during the Miocene or Pliocene. Current evidence supports an endemic origin of North American Mammut from Zygolophodon without later migration because of the gradual appearance of Mammut morphologies and a lack of solid evidence that Mammut sensu stricto (in a strict sense) ever dispersed outside of North America.

M. matthewi is recorded from the late Hemphillian to early Blancan stages. Mammutid specimens of the Hemphillian and Blancan had typically previously been assigned to M. matthewi, but this is seemingly the result of overreliance on stratigraphic positions to define taxa. M. vexillarius, M. raki, and M. cosoensis are definitively recorded from the Blancan, and M. raki specifically is thought to not be synonymous with M. pacificum. M. americanum (known popularly as an "American mastodon" or simply "mastodon") is also stratigraphically recorded first from the early Blancan of the Ringold Formation, Washington. The age of the formation where the mammutid specimen was found dates to about 3.75 Ma. It is also known from multiple other Blancan sites such as Fish Springs Flat in Nevada. From the Irvingtonian to the Rancholabrean (from around 1.6 million to 11,000 years ago), only M. americanum and the newly appearing M. pacificum are recorded, the former having an exceptional level of diversity based on abundant skeletal evidences from the late Pleistocene that is unusual for the typical mammutid fossil record.

The following cladogram defines the phylogeny of certain proboscideans, a majority known from endocasts, including M. americanum:

- Proboscidea
  - Phosphatherium esculliei
  - - Numidotherium koholense
    - - Moeritherium lyonsi
      - - Deinotheriidae
        - Elephantiformes
          - Palaeomastodon beadnelli
          - Elephantimorpha
            - - Mammutidae
                - Mammut americanum
                - "Mammut" borsoni
            - - Choerolophodon pentelici
              - - Gomphotherium augustidens
                - - Cuvieronius andium
                  - Stegomastodon humboldti
                  - Elephantoidea
                    - Stegodon insignis
                    - Elephantidae
                      - - - Mammuthus meridionalis
                          - Mammuthus primigenius
                          - Mammuthus columbi
                        - Elephas maximus
                      - Loxodonta africana
                      - Palaeoloxodon
                        - Palaeoloxodon antiquus
                        - Palaeoloxodon falconeri

== Description ==
=== Skull ===
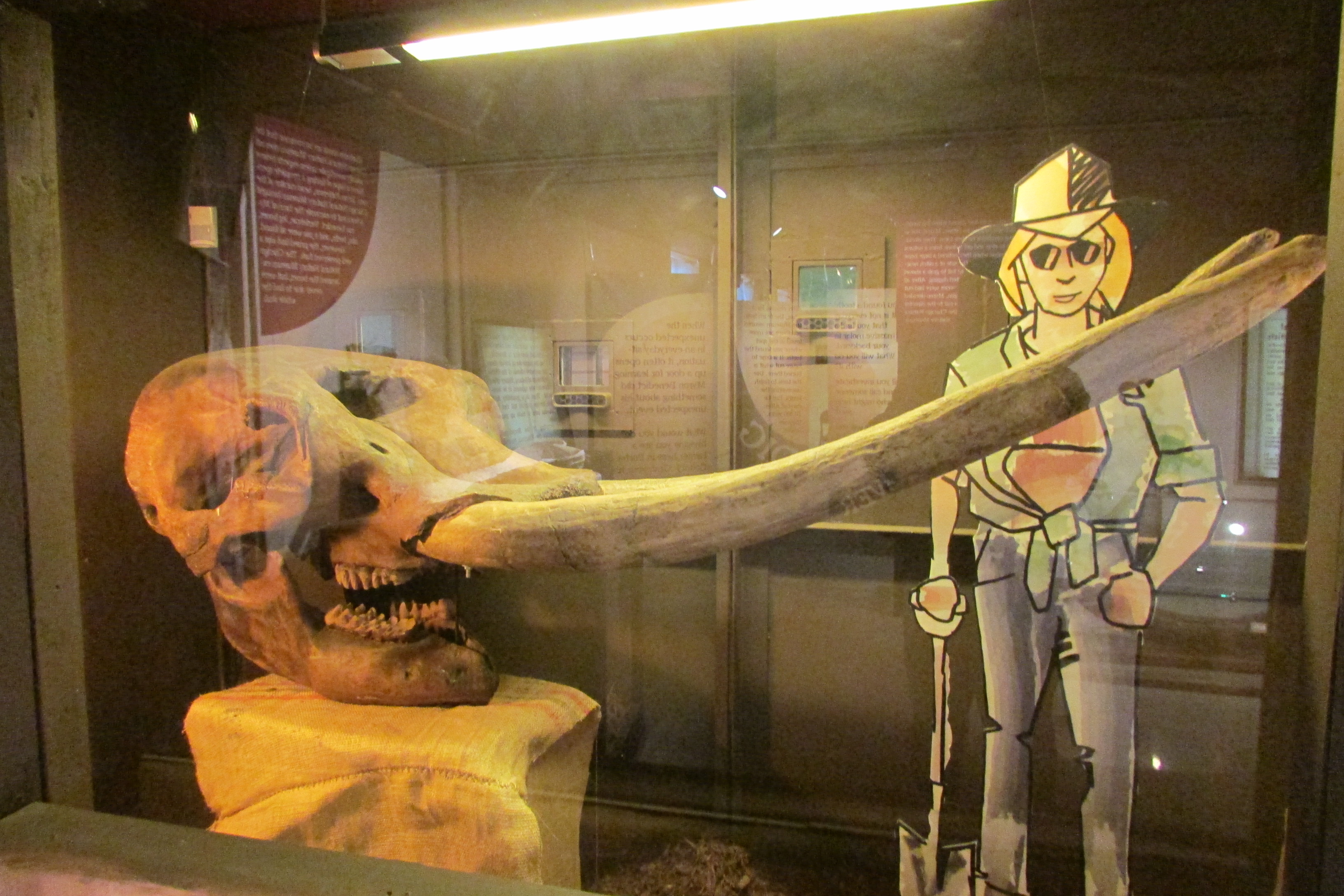
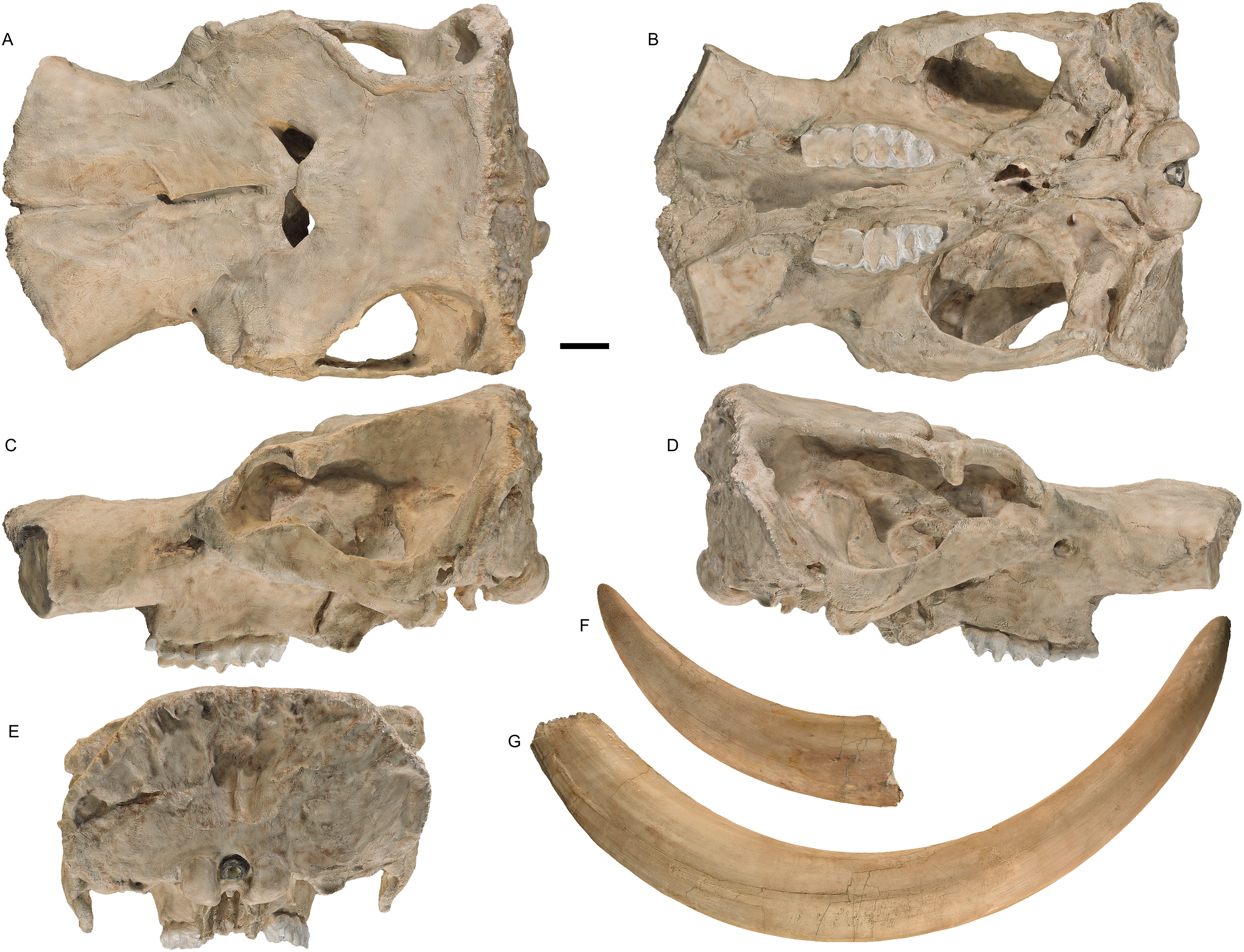
Articulated M. americanum skull at the Porter County Museum (left) and an unarticulated cranium plus tusks of M. pacificum (right)

Mammut is diagnosed and differentiated in terms of the skull from Zygolophodon as having a shortened bottom skull base (basicranium) and a high-domed cranium. It is also diagnosed as having an "elephantoid" mandible with a shortened mandibular symphysis (or "brevirostrine") and a protruding angular process in the mandible. The diagnosis accounts for both true Mammut species and Mammut species pending reassessments. The shortening of the symphysis is one of the major evolutionary trends observed in Neogene mammutids, making it critical in understanding the evolutionary transition from Zygolophodon to Mammut. However, mandibular remains with characteristics of Mammut are not known from any anywhere within the Hemphillian, thus making the transition poorly understood. It differs from Sinomammut by the shortened mandibular symphysis, although Mammut sometimes retained lower tusks unlike the other genus. The shortened mandibular symphysis in Mammut and the similarity of its skull with modern elephants would have allowed for an elephant-like prehensile trunk perhaps long enough to reach the ground.

M. americanum is diagnosed as having a long plus low skull and a shortened mandible. The frontal bone (or forehead) gives off a flattened appearance compared to extant elephants. The skull of M. americanum has many plesiomorphies (or ancestral traits) that can be observed, namely the low and flat brain case, a slightly vertical basicranium, a narrow nasal aperture inlet of the nose with no step-like perinasal fossa, and a backside infraorbital foramen. At least some of these features are thought to have been acquired from Phiomia. The nasal aperture of M. americanum is oval, whereas that of the skull of "M." cf. obliquelophus is more trapezoidal. M. americanum is also more derived based on the lack of a strong proximal constriction of the incisive fossa of the incisive foramen. M. americanum also has a high and narrow orbit with a somewhat rectangular outline, but it is less rectangular than that of Eozygodon. The North American mammutid retains a primitive trait in the form of the orbit containing a lacrimal bone with a hole known as the lacrimal foramen. Unlike elephantidans, it has another primitive trait of a short and high-positioned temporal fossa, a trait shared with Eozygodon.

=== Endocast anatomy ===
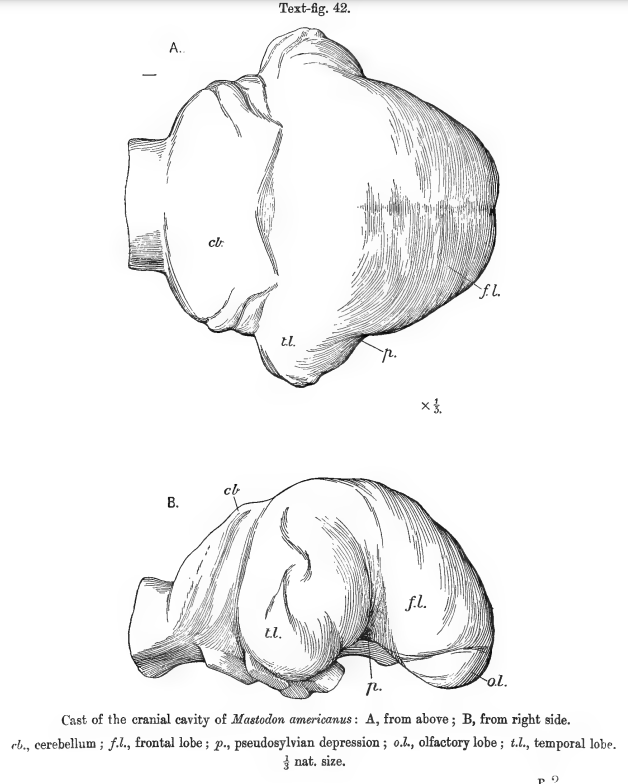
Illustration of the endocast of M. americanum without any visible olfactory bulbs, 1906

M. americanum is known by several brain endocasts stored in American museums, although they are seldom subjected to studies. In 1973, neuroscientist Harry J. Jerison studied an endocast of Mammut, recording that it was elephantlike in both size and shape. According to Shoshani et al. in 2006, the endocast of M. americanum features the olfactory bulbs protruding in front of the frontal lobe. They also drew several proboscidean brains to scale, in which the brain of M. americanum was much larger than that of Moeritherium lyonsi but smaller than that of the Asian elephant (Elephas maximus).

Julien Benoit et al. in 2022 explained that while the front tips of the olfactory bulbs of "M." borsoni are partially visible in the brain's back (or dorsal) area, its visibility in M. americanum is debated. Some authors had argued that the olfactory bulbs are visible in the brain's back area while some other authors did not portray them as being visible. The researchers confirmed based on one specimen that the olfactory bulbs are only partially visible in the brain's back area. They also observed that "M." borsoni, despite weighing twice as much as M. americanum, had a 30% lower encephalization quotient (EQ) compared to the other mammutid species, supporting the idea that the evolution of proboscidean encephalization is tied with phylogeny. The Mammutida, as the most basal clade of the Elephantimorpha, has an EQ twice that of Moeritherium and Palaeomastodon. The endocast volume and brain size of the brain M. americanum are larger than those of Stegodon but smaller than those of derived elephantids. It has an EQ that is higher than those of Paleogene proboscideans and "M." borsoni but lower than those of elephantids (extant and extinct) and stegodonts.

The type species is also known from endocasts of ear petrosals. According to Eric G. Ekdale, the ear petrosals of Mammut cannot automatically be distinguished from Mammuthus alone. The subarcuate fossa is absent from the cerebellar surface of the inner ear. The ear petrosals of Mammut are relatively incomplete, leaving several traits to be unable to be observed.

=== Dentition ===
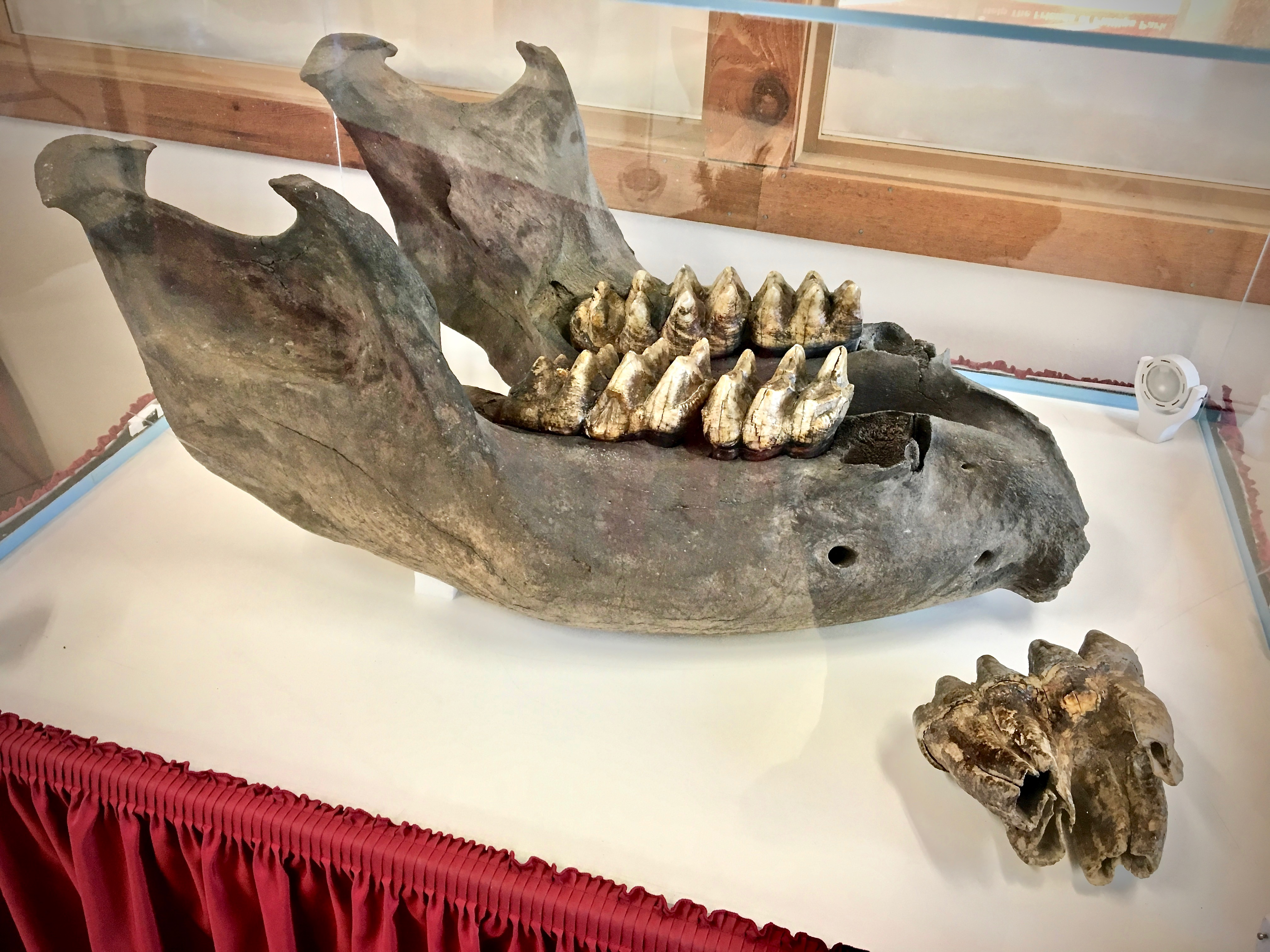
M. americanum lower jaw and molars, Phillips Park (Aurora, Illinois)

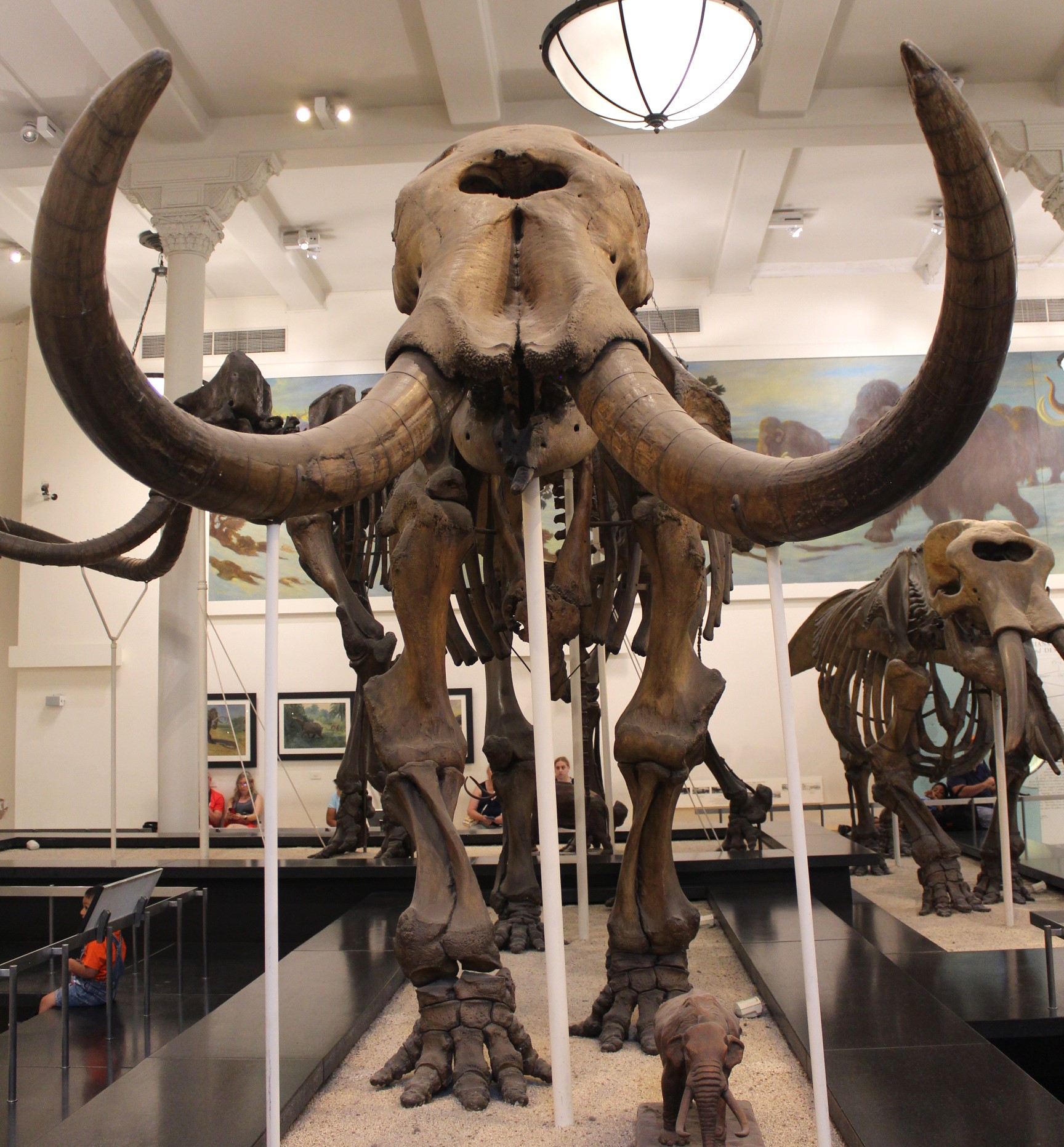
Front view of the "Warren mastodon" (M. americanum). Note the presence of a single vestigial mandibular tusk.

The family Mammutidae is defined by zygolophodont molars with compressed and sharp transverse ridges plus lack of accessory conules (smaller cusps). The intermediate molars, or the first two molars, are consistently trilophodont, or three-cusped. The dental morphologies of the clade Mammutida contrast strongly with most members of both the Elephantida (bunodont molars that evolutionarily convert to being thin and platelike) and the Deinotheriidae (tapir-like lophodont to bilophodont molars). The zygodont morphologies of the molars of mammutids were conservative, meaning that they hardly changed in the evolutionary history of the family. Mammutids also exhibited evidences of horizontal tooth displacement where milk teeth were gradually replaced by permanent molars, mirroring elephantidans in an instance of parallel evolution. The Mammutidae was not the only proboscidean family to have acquired zygodont crested molars, as Neogene species of the gomphothere Sinomastodon display moderate to weak zygodont crests. Pleistocene species of Sinomastodon do not display zygodont crests, however.

The dentition of Mammut is diagnosed as being strongly zygodont and having no conules. The lophs extend to the long axis of the molars. The first two molars in the dental row have no more than three lophs while the third molars have four lophs plus a cingulum. The upper tusks (or upper incisors) of Mammut differ from those of Zygolophodon by the generally larger sizes, tendency to either straighten or curve up, and the typical lack of any enamel band, although M. vexillarius retains a very narrow strip of enamel in the upper tusks. The lower (or mandibular) tusks tend to be reduced in comparison. M. nevadanum represents the earliest case of a North American mammutid species without any enamel band, although the possibility of it being worn off by wear cannot automatically be eliminated. It differs from M. americanum and M. pacificum by the nearly straight but downward-facing upper tusk, whereas males of the latter two species have large and upward-facing upper tusks while females had upward or straight but frontward-directed upper tusks. The reduction to loss of the lower tusks plus reduction of the mandibular symphysis of the derived Mammutidae and Elephantida is an instance of convergent evolution, correlating potentially with the need to reduce heat loss due to the decrease of global temperature and humidity during the late Miocene and Pliocene. Despite the reductions of the lower tusks, they were still present in Neogene species of Mammut. Pleistocene M. americanum comparatively often lacks mandibular tusks, and M. pacificum is always devoid of them. The presence of lower tusks in M. raki separates it as a species from M. pacificum. M. pacificum differs from M. americanum in part by the narrower molars. Both species have broader molars compared to the "narrow-toothed" M. nevadanum, M. raki, and M. cosoensis.

Like its relative "M." borsoni, M. americanum had very large tusks, with some records suggesting lengths of 3 m (9.8 ft) and diameters exceeding 200 mm (7.9 in) were not unusual. In the skull of the earlier-appearing M. matthewi, its dental alveolus of the right tusk from the locality of Hermiston, Oregon suggests a tusk diameter of approximately 200 mm (7.9 in). Similar to modern elephants, M. americanum also has degrees of sexual dimorphism indicated by the sizes of the upper tusks. Adult males have tusks 1.15–1.25 times as large as those of adult females, also reflecting general body size differences between the two sexes. The sizes of the tusk also depend on the ages of the individuals, as older individuals have larger tusk circumferences than younger ones. Adult individuals of comparable ages have similar tusk sizes, but older individuals do not necessarily have larger tusk sizes. Tusk sizes may have depended on external factors like nutritional stress, geographic location, and reproductive status. The tusks of M. pacificum are thought to have been smaller in length and circumstance than that of M. americanum and may have similarly exhibited degrees of sexual dimorphism.

=== Postcranial skeleton ===
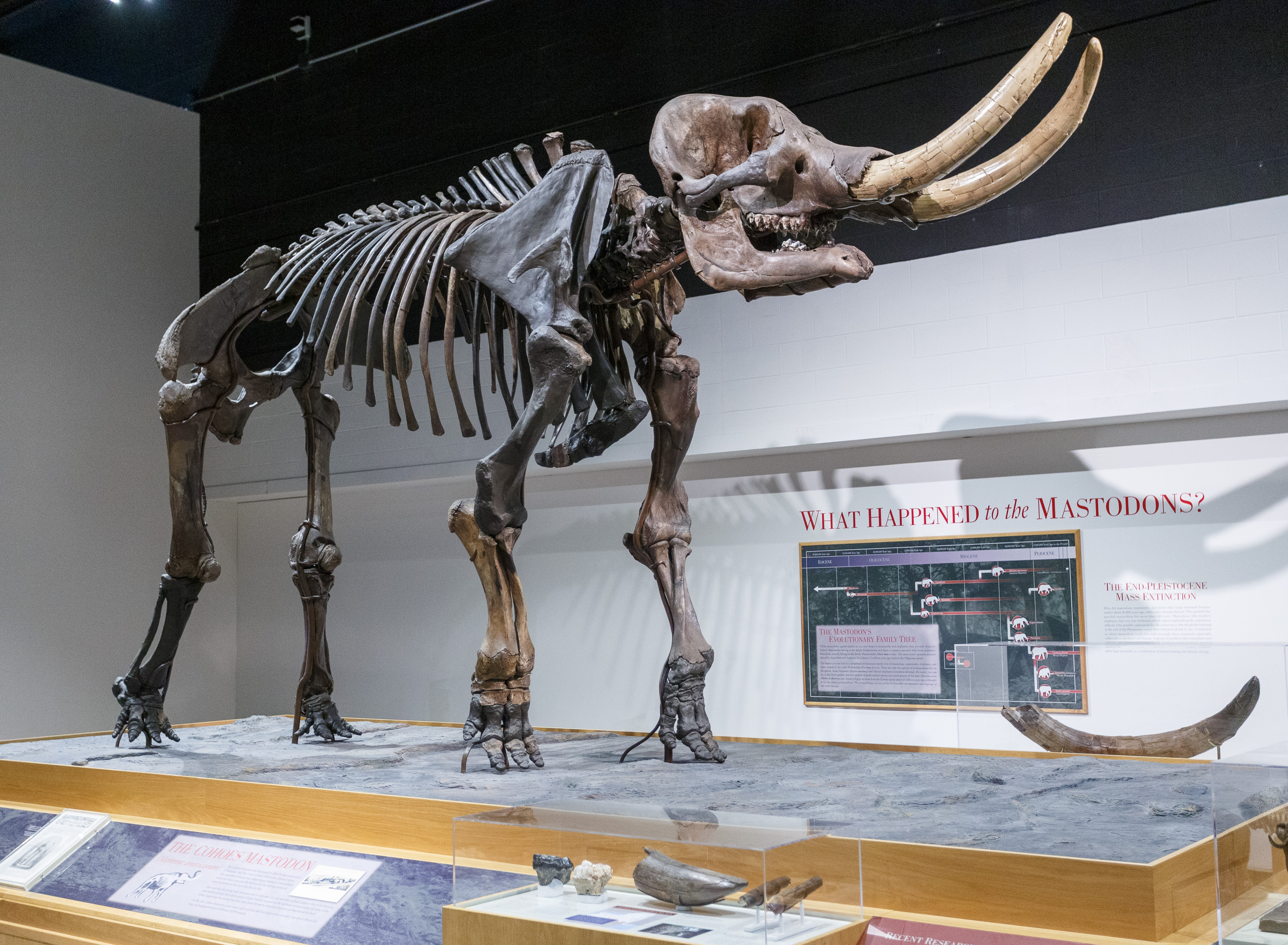
"Cohoes Mastodon" skeleton, New York State Museum

As a result of proboscidean diagnoses focusing mostly on dentition, the postcranial anatomies of fossil proboscideans like Mammut are underrepresented in academic literature. Jennifer A. Hodgson et al. compared the anatomies of Mammut and Mammuthus, mentioning that their postcranial anatomies were studied previously by Stanley John Olsen in 1972 and recognizing that the two genera were only distantly related to each other. M. americanum is typically depicted as stocky based on postcranial evidence.

The vertebral column (also known as the backbone or spine) of Mammut is documented as having a highest point located in the shoulder's front like Mammuthus, but the spines gradually decrease in length then increase slightly in the rear area. The number of ribs and vertebrae of Mammut is not well-documented in paleontological literature and may vary by individual. Mammut usually has 20 thoracic vertebrae whereas Mammuthus usually has 19, but both have documented individuals with 18 of them. The reduction of thoracic vertebrae in Mammuthus is considered a derived trait also present in modern elephants. The "Watkins Glen mastodon," for example, has 7 cervical vertebrae, 20 thoracic vertebrae, 3 lumbar vertebrae, and 5 sacral vertebrae. They believed that Mammut could have had as many as 20 ribs and that the back ribs were shorter and broader than that of Mammuthus. The tail of Mammut may have been made up of as many as up to 27 caudal vertebrae, suggesting that it had a long tail compared to gomphotheres and elephantids.

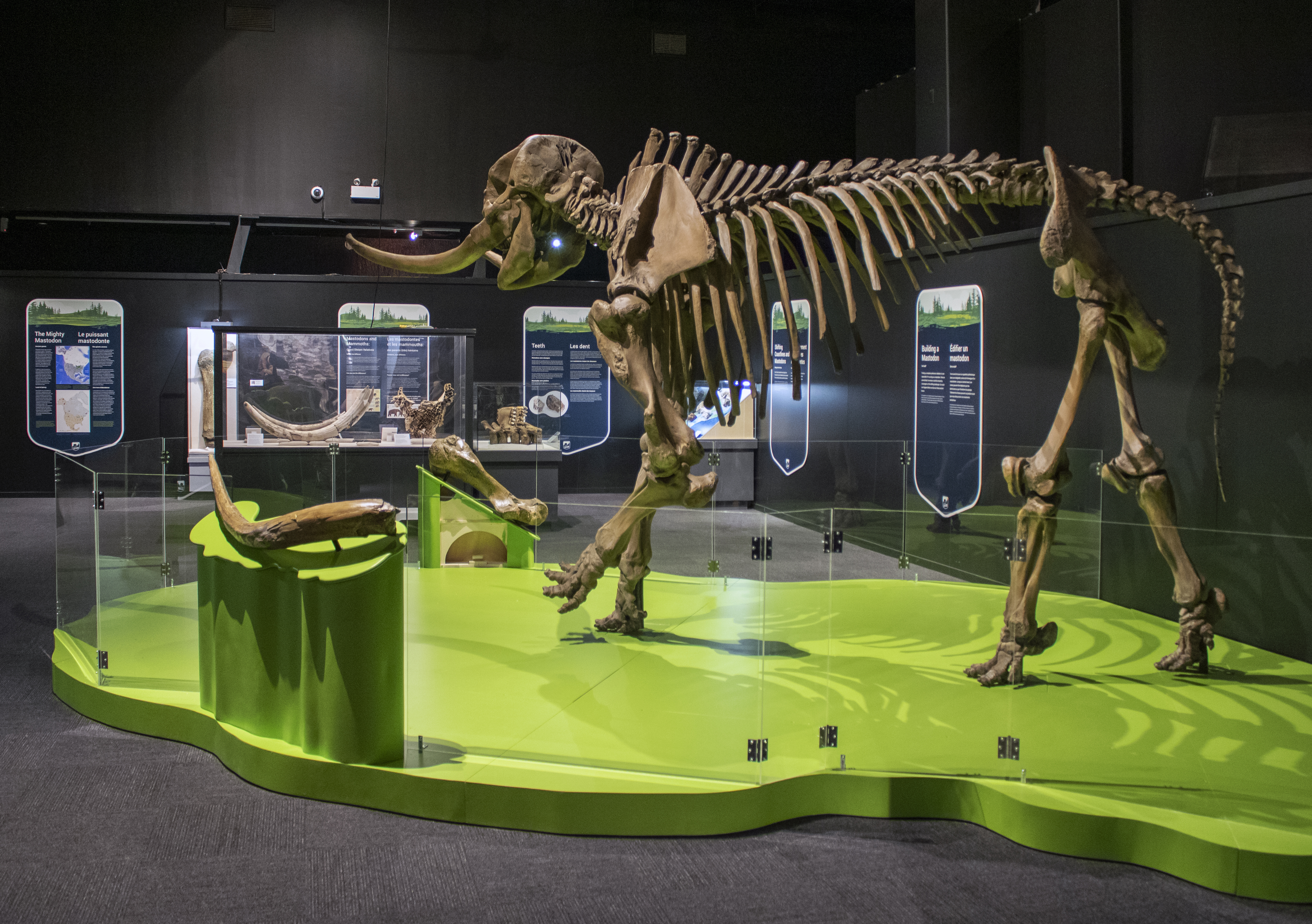
M. americanum skeleton, Nova Scotia Museum of Natural History

The scapula (or shoulder blade) of Mammut has a straight vertebral border, contrasting with a more concave vertebral border of Mammuthus. Hodgson et al. disagreed with the claim by Olsen in 1972 that the neck of the scapula is more constricted in Mammuthus primigenius than Mammut americanum, since neither of the two M. americanum scapulae observed by the researchers have any high constriction there. The pelvis allows for identification of the sex of the species, as male Mammut individuals have a smaller pelvic outlet and wider ilium than female individuals.

Mammut has shorter and more robust limb bones compared to those of derived elephantids, probably the result of it retaining primitive anatomical traits. Both the humerus and radius of the mammutid genus are robust for instance. The ulna has a slightly more developed olecranon process and a deeper trochlear notch. The femur is somewhat thick, short, and appears to have more expanded condyles. Possibly, sexual dimorphism could be a factor behind the size of the femur itself. The tibia does not appear much different in both Mammut and Mammuthus, whereas the fibula may have only had subtle and complex differences within the two genera. The bones within both the front feet and back feet have their own subtle and complex differences by genus, but both have smaller and more narrow hind feet than fore feet so that the latter bears more weight of the proboscideans. In terms of postcranial anatomy, M. pacificum differs from M. americanum by the presence of six as opposed to five sacral vertebrae and the femur having a larger diameter of the middle shaft (or main cylindrical area).

=== External features ===
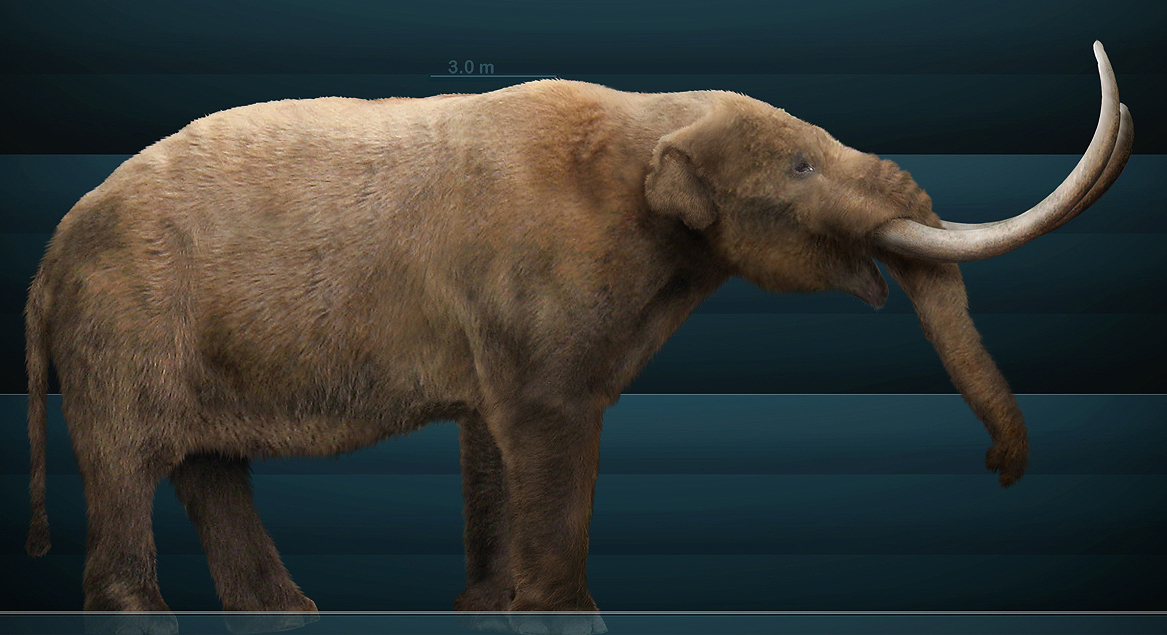
Restoration of a mastodon with fur. The hypothesis that Mammut had thick coats of fur has been questioned.

The American mastodon (M. americanum) has typically been depicted as having shaggy and brown-colored fur in reconstructions, especially in over a century of paleoart. Despite this, there is little direct evidence supporting the idea that Mammut was actually covered in hair. Supposedly, only one find of fur belonging to the mastodon is of a skull with two small hairy patches of skin from the state of Wisconsin near the city of Milwaukee. These have only been described briefly in the original literature and have never been figured beyond one hair from a scanning electron microscope (SEM). K.F. Hallin and D. Gabriel in 1981 speculated that mastodons were indeed hairy but were more suited for semiaquatic lifestyles than tolerance of colder climates. Matt Davis et al. in 2022 were tentative in accepting the source as evidence for hairiness, as they questioned whether Mammut needed thick coats for body warmth for their upper ranges at the Arctic and Subarctic and mentioned that it would not have needed them in subtropical climates like in Florida.

Davis et al. referenced that because Columbian mammoths (Mammuthus columbi) were not thought to be hairy, it is unclear why mastodons would need thick coats in comparison. The former was typically depicted as hairless and the latter as hairy in paleoart, but the mastodon's preferences for closed or mixed habitats combined with its capability of living at subtropical climates in Florida puts the speculations into question, as it does not explain why mastodons would be hairy but not Columbian mammoths. They felt the need to portray the latter as hairy so that the average person could differentiate between the two species.

The concept of M. americanum having thick coats of fur was also subjected to study by Asier Larramendi in 2015. He acknowledged that hair is important for thermoregulation in extant elephants but that there is a negative correlation between body size and hair density in mammals. Some mammals have broken this trend before, however, as woolly mammoths (Mammuthus primigenius) evolved to have thick coats of hair and a very short tail in response to cold climates. The idea that the American mastodon had hair is possible because of the seasonal climates, but there are few preserved soft tissues to support this idea, referencing the hairs found in Wisconsin. The supposed evidence of hair reported in the 19th century were actually just green algae filaments. He concluded that the long tail and large body mass both contradict the hypothesis that M. americanum was covered with thick coats of fur, considering it to be probably exaggerated.

=== Size and weight ===
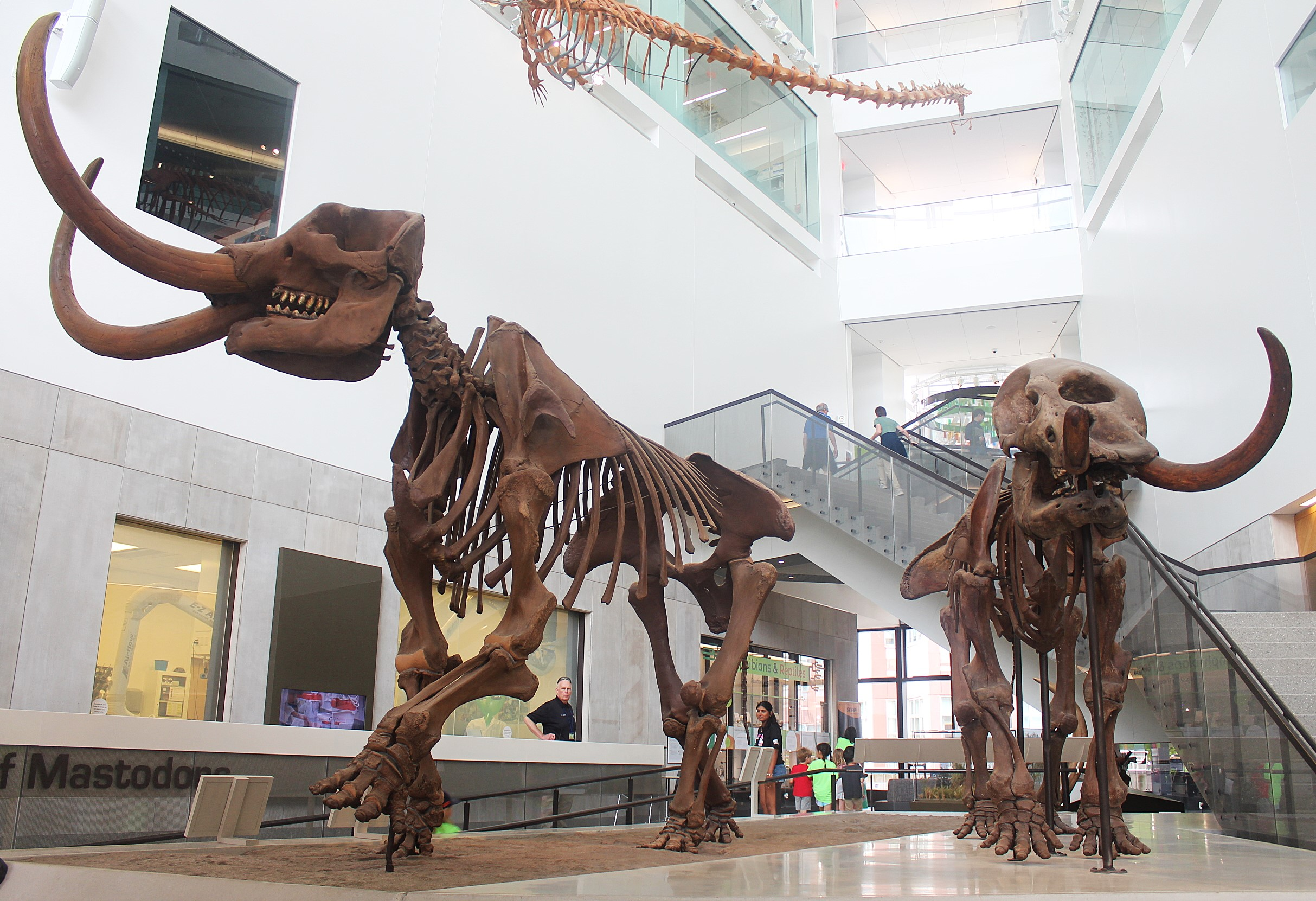
M. americanum male ("Beusching mastodon," left) and female ("Owosso mastodon," right), University of Michigan Museum of Natural History

According to Larramendi, the mammutids of the genus Mammut were among the largest known proboscideans. This was especially the case with "M." borsoni, males of which are suggested to have had an average body mass of 16 t (16 long tons; 18 short tons) making it the largest known proboscidean alongside the extinct Indian elephant species Palaeoloxodon namadicus, and one of the largest land mammals to have ever lived. M. americanum in comparison to "M." borsoni was much smaller, but it was still large in its own right compared to extant elephants. The American mastodon did not grow taller than living elephants but it was much more robust in body build than them, in part due to its very broad pelvis. The Warren mastodon produces a body mass of nearby 7.8 t (7.7 long tons; 8.6 short tons) and had a shoulder height measuring 289 cm (114 in). This robustness is so pronounced that M. americanum individuals could have been up to 80% heavier than an elephant with the same shoulder height. Larger than average individuals may have possibly had a shoulder height of 325 cm (128 in) and weighed up to 11 t (11 long tons; 12 short tons). 90% of fully grown male M. americanum individuals are suggested to have had shoulder heights ranging from 275 cm (108 in) to 305 cm (120 in) and body masses ranging from 6.8 t (6.7 long tons; 7.5 short tons) to 9.2 t (9.1 long tons; 10.1 short tons) in body mass, with an average fully grown M. americanum male estimated at 2.9 m (9 ft 6 in) in shoulder height and 8 t (7.9 long tons; 8.8 short tons) in body mass. These estimates place males as larger on average in weight and shoulder height than those of both the living Asian elephant and African forest elephant, and heavier but somewhat shorter than average males of African bush elephants.

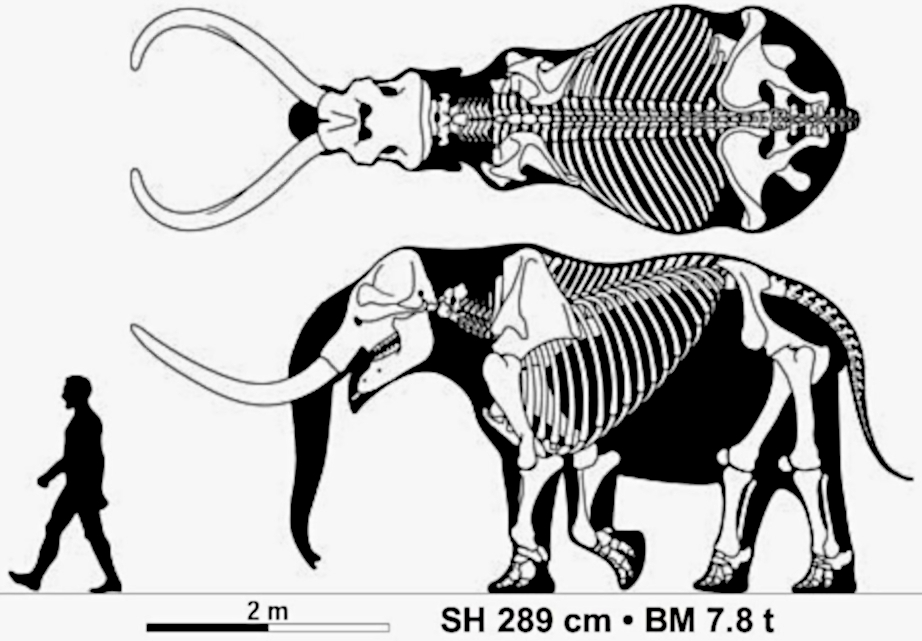
Skeletal diagram of the "Warren mastodon" specimen, an adult bull of M. americanum compared to a human

The size of the "Overmyer Mastodon," an individual skeleton recovered from the farm of Robert Overmyer northwest of Rochester, Indiana in 1976, was estimated by Neal Woodman and Jon W. Branstrator in 2008. They estimated based on the length of the humerus (829 mm (32.6 in)) that the shoulder height of the individual was 230.2 cm (90.6 in), which they said was close to the average shoulder height of the species and comparable to a large female or small male. Similar to extant elephants, male American mastodon individuals tended to be larger than female individuals and tend to have larger and more strongly curved tusks, although the degree to which the body size is a factor in molar size is unclear.

A relatively complete skeleton of Mammut sp. from the Gray Fossil Site in Tennessee, which was first uncovered in 2015, dates to the latest Hemphillian, and has an elongated mandibular symphysis and large mandibular tusks, is thought to have been several tonnes larger than M. americanum and even several species of Mammuthus. The specimens are still being prepared for further studies.

== Paleobiology ==
=== Diet ===
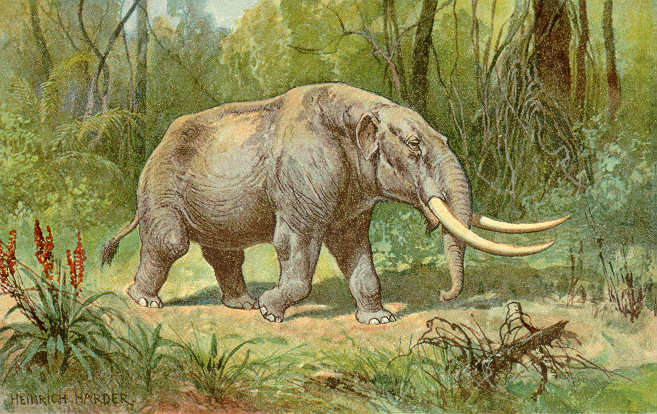
Restoration of an American mastodon without fur by Heinrich Harder (illustration c. 1920)

The zygodont molar morphologies of mammutids suggest that they consistently occupied adaptations to folivorous diets throughout their evolutionary history. This means that mammutids such as Mammut, because they retained zygodont molars, were built to browse on higher vegetation and did not shift towards grazing specializations or consistent mixed feeding. The stomach contents of M. americanum indicate that the species consumed spruce needles, pine cones, grass, and occasionally gourds plus vine leaves. Of note is that whereas mammutids of Eurasia went extinct by the early Pleistocene in association with more seasonal climates, Mammut survived in North America and became abundant, although the reason for the latter faunal trend does not have any offered explanation. The browsing specialization of Mammut is supported further by the coprolites (or fossil dung) of M. americanum, which are large-sized similar to extant elephants and predominantly consist of consumed woody contents but no grass. The dental microwear of Mammut molars and the dental calculus covering their teeth both nevertheless suggest that these proboscideans did consume grass on occasion. The diet of M. americanum was consistently predominantly made up of C_{3} plants. Of the Pleistocene New World proboscideans, the American mastodon appears to have been the most consistent in browsing rather than grazing, consuming C_{3} as opposed to C_{4} plants, and occupying closed forests versus more open habitats. This dietary inflexibility may have prevented them from invading South America during the Great American Interchange, due to the need to cross areas of grassland to do so.

The mastodon commonly browsed on woody plants (i.e. twigs) and fruits, occupying dense coniferous forests made up of spruces (Picea) and pines (Pinus) within most of eastern North America. In Florida, it consumed twigs of the genus Taxodium as well as other woody plants and fruits. Based on carbon isotopic analyses of mastodons in Florida, they had low δ^{13}C values which indicate C_{3} browsing specialization. The dietary preferences of North American Mammut are thought to have mirrored those of the older Zygolophodon, which may have preferred living in closed forests and consuming conifers to avoid active competition with the bunodont gomphotheres and lophodont deinotheres in the Miocene of Europe. Most accounts of gut contents have identified coniferous twigs as the dominant element in their diet. In addition to twigs and leaves, as indicated by the "Heisler mastodon" of Michigan and the "Burning Tree mastodon" of Ohio, mastodons may have also consumed swamp grasses (Glyceria and Zizania) as well as semiaquatic and aquatic plants such as sedge marshes (Carex) that surrounded lakes. They may have additionally ingested other aquatic plants and aquatic invertebrates while consuming more than 100 L (22 imp gal; 26 US gal) of water from lakes a day. The temporal shifts in molar and limb bone sizes in mastodon populations from Missouri and Florida as well as apparent differences in body size between western and eastern populations suggest that M. americanum was an adaptable species for local environmental shifts. Regardless, it depended heavily on forested environments similar to tapirs, so significant closed vegetation losses of any sort could have impacted them.

As a result of the consistent browsing specializations of the genus, Mammut occupied an ecological niche that allowed it to actively niche partition (or occupy similar but niche ecological spaces) with other proboscideans of North America in the Neogene-Quaternary. In the Blancan, M. raki showed few morphological changes. In stark contrast, the contemporary gomphothere Stegomastodon showed progressive developments in response to increasingly arid and extensive grasslands from the Blancan up to the early Irvingtonian, with molar complexities resembling those of Mammuthus. The morphology of Stegomastodon suggests thus that it was grazing-specialized. A more well-known example of niche partitioning occurred between mastodons and mammoths within the later Pleistocene (Irvingtonian-Rancholabrean). Mammoths had a broader range of diets that allow them to occupy mixed feeding to specialized grazing habits whereas mastodons were specialized browsers that nonetheless still could have consumed a variety of plants. Mammoth diets varied by region whereas those of mastodons remain unclear still. Both at times overlapped in C_{3} resource usages, although whether this represents browsing or grazing in the case of mammoths remains unclear.

=== Social behaviors ===
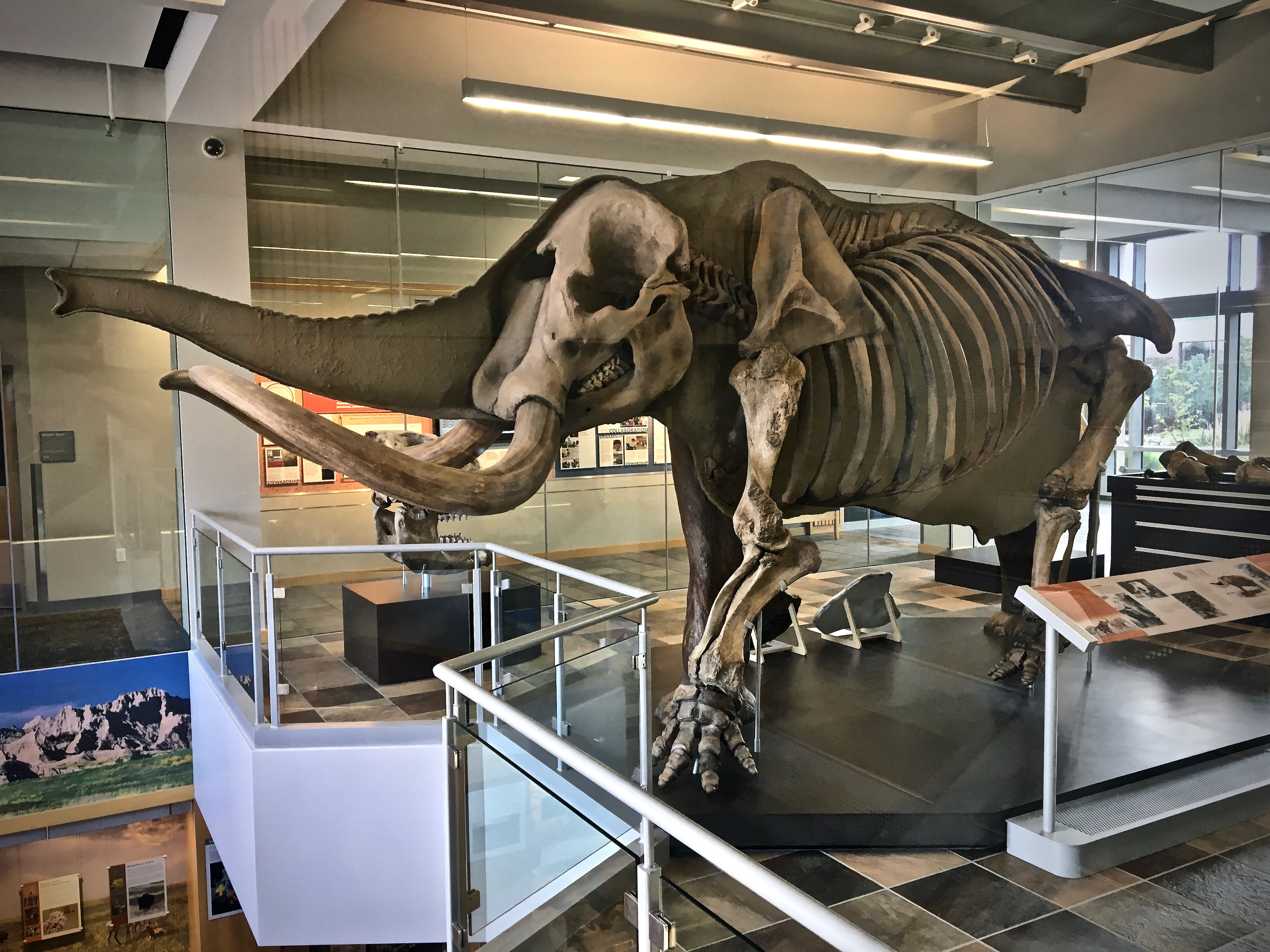
American mastodon ("Perry mastodon") skeleton with silhouette in back including the trunk, Wheaton College (Illinois)

American mastodons may have lived in herds, and it is possible that they were smaller than mammoth herds on average. Based on the characteristics of mastodon bone sites and strontium and oxygen isotopes from tusks, it can be inferred that, as in modern proboscideans, the mastodon social group consisted of adult females and young, living in bonded groups called mixed herds. The males abandoned the mixed herds once reaching sexual maturity and lived either alone or in male bond groupings. As in modern elephants, there probably was no seasonal synchrony of mating activity, with both males and females seeking out each other for mating when sexually active. Mastodons and other Pleistocene proboscideans may have used landscapes seasonally then migrated to suitable areas to mate or give birth. It is estimated that it may have taken 9 to 12 years for American mastodon females to become mature enough for reproduction, and they may have slowly reproduced single calves at a time.

The social behaviors of male mastodon were inferred from one individual skeleton known as the "Buesching mastodon" (known informally as "Fred"), which was recovered from a peat farm near Fort Wayne, Indiana in 1998. The mastodon individual lived during the later part of the Bølling–Allerød warming period when human populations were present. The Buesching mastodon's tusks grew for about 30 years, and he lived for 34 years total, an approximate lifespan comparable to other males. He may have had engaged in aggressive behavior from musth, although it may have been season-specific compared to living elephants given climatic conditions in North America. He likely engaged in intraspecific competition late in his life with other males during the spring or early summer, and he had tusk fractures and may have been severely wounded from a 4 cm (1.6 in) to 5 cm (2.0 in) puncture to the right-sided temporal fossa. Multiple other males are recorded to have had severe wounds resulting from male-male musth fighting, with comparative analysis of mastodon and modern African bush elephant pathologies suggesting that the prevalence of rib fractures in mastodons likely reflected similar patterns of intraspecific violence to African bush elephants. The Buesching mastodon likely considered central Indiana his main home but went on seasonal migrations in his lifetime. He could have traveled hundreds of kilometers in the process and engaged with mates outside of the herd he was born from. Around his last moments, he probably wandered around in vagabondlike behaviors and spent little time in the area where his skeleton was found. His inferred behavior is quite similar to extant elephants.

=== Genetic diversity ===
A 2025 analysis of mitochondrial DNA from Pleistocene Mammut indicated a divergence date of 1.3Mya between M. americanum & M. pacificus. A similar divergence date for a specimen from central Mexico suggests the existence of a separate Mexican species of Mammut. While western M. americanum are represented by two clades, four clades of M. americanum existed in north-eastern North America, likely representing at least three migration pulses into the region tied to climate change.

== Paleoecology ==
=== Distribution ===
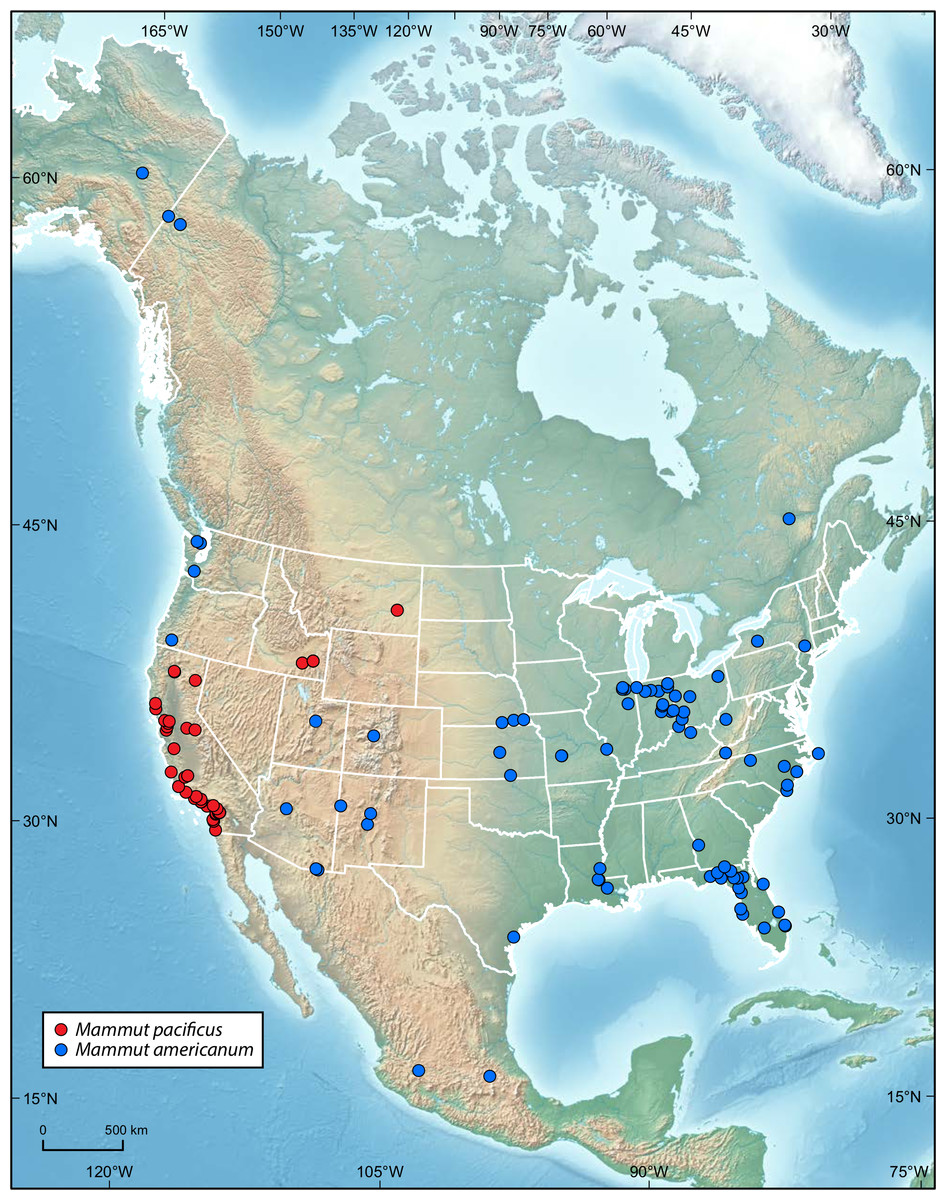
North American map of the distributions of M. americanum (blue) and M. pacificum (red) fossil localities of the Irvingtonian-Rancholabrean

The range of most species of Mammut is unknown as their occurrences are restricted to few localities, the exception being the American mastodon (M. americanum), which is one of the most widely distributed Pleistocene proboscideans in North America. M. americanum fossil sites range in time from the Blancan to Rancholabrean faunal stages and in locations from as far north as Alaska, as far east as Florida, and as far south as the state of Puebla in central Mexico. M. americanum was most common in the eastern United States but rarer in the western US in comparison. M. pacificum is known across California and present as far north as southern Idaho, but it was apparently absent from both the Sonoran Desert and Mojave Desert regions. The elevated-controlled distributions of coniferous forests within the Rocky Mountain region may have limited populations of Mammut compared to the other Plio-Pleistocene proboscideans. The easternmost range of the species was in what is now Montana in the Irvingtonian but may have been extirpated from the area as a result of Illinoian glaciation. An isolated record of M. americanum is known from Honduras, where the genus is not recorded to have extended beyond.

M. matthewi is known by a wide distribution range, its westernmost range being in California from the Horned Toad Formation in the late Hemphillian. It has also apparently been identified from the latest Hemphillian based on skull material from the Pascagoula Formation in Tunica Hills, Louisiana. This suggests that Mammut already had an eastern range in the United States by the latest Miocene or earliest Pliocene. Similarly, the same species is recorded from the Palmetto Fauna locality (Bone Valley Formation) in Brewster, Florida in the latest Hemphillian while Mammut sp. is recorded from the Gray Fossil Site in Tennessee.

The American mastodon was only present in the far north of North America during interglacial periods, with mitochondrial genome analysis suggesting that separate populations repeatedly colonised the region before becoming extirpated during glacial periods. A 2022 study of ancient environmental DNA from the Kap Kobenhavn Formation of northern Greenland, dating the Early Pleistocene, 2 million years ago, identified preserved DNA fragments of mastodons. This suggests that the mammutids ranged as far north as Greenland during optimal conditions. Around this time, northern Greenland was 11–19 °C warmer than the Holocene, with a boreal forest hosting a species assemblage with no modern analogue. These are among the oldest DNA fragments ever sequenced.

=== Late Neogene-Quaternary North America ===
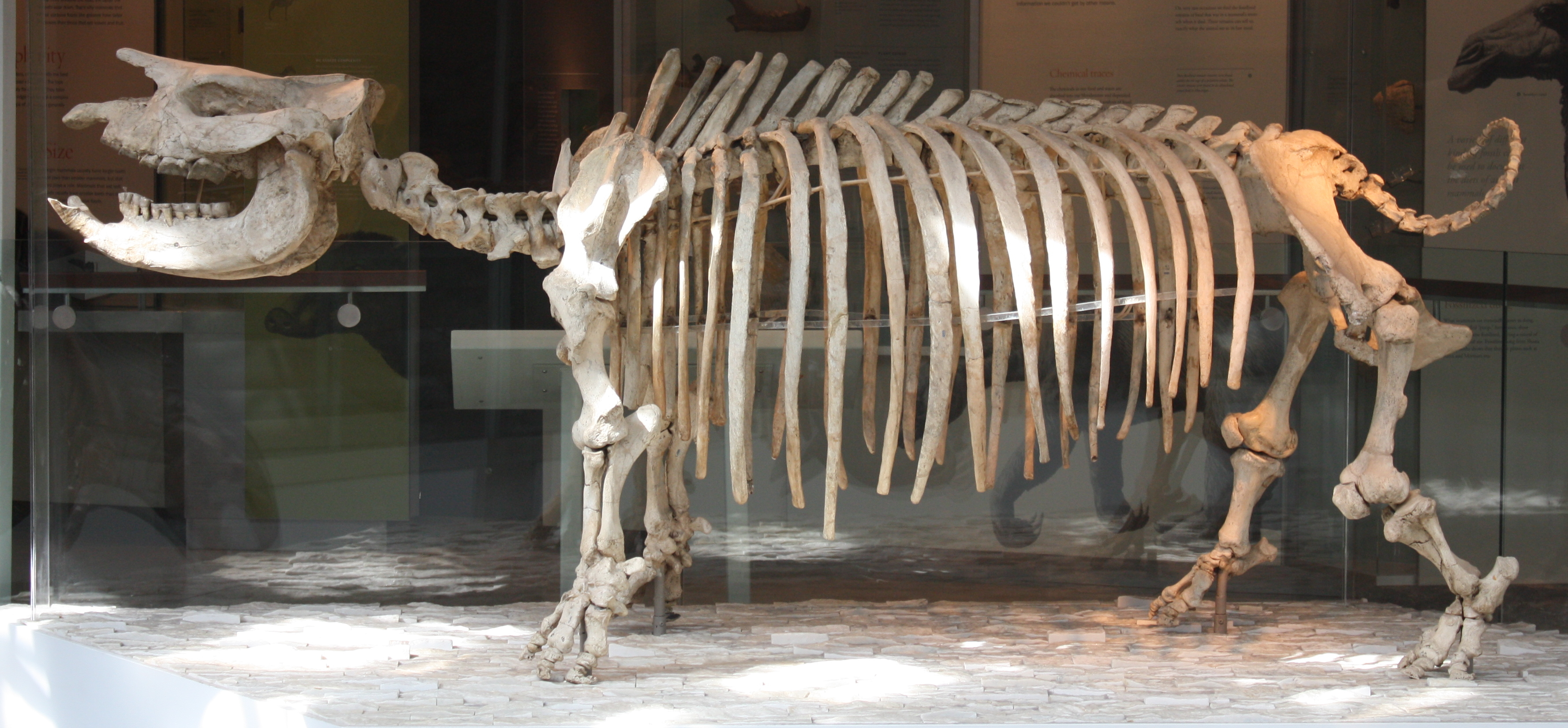
Teleoceras fossiger skeleton, Natural History Museum of Los Angeles County. Mammut coexisted with rhinocerotids up to the Pliocene.

The overall paleontological record of the Neogene of North America is relatively incomplete compared to other areas of the world. This is the result of a greater fossil record bias of western North America compared to eastern North America, meaning that the western half is better understood in terms of evolutionary and climatic trends while the eastern half is poorly understood. During the late Neogene (8-5 Ma), C_{4} grasslands spread throughout the North American continent and replaced woodland habitats. In eastern North America were relict woodlands in an increasingly drier climate followed by a large faunal turnover. There was a long-term decline of genus-level faunal diversity, with many large-sized herbivores going extinct. Many of the surviving herbivorous faunas were thus adapted for drier and more open habitats resulting from cooling and increase in seasonality.

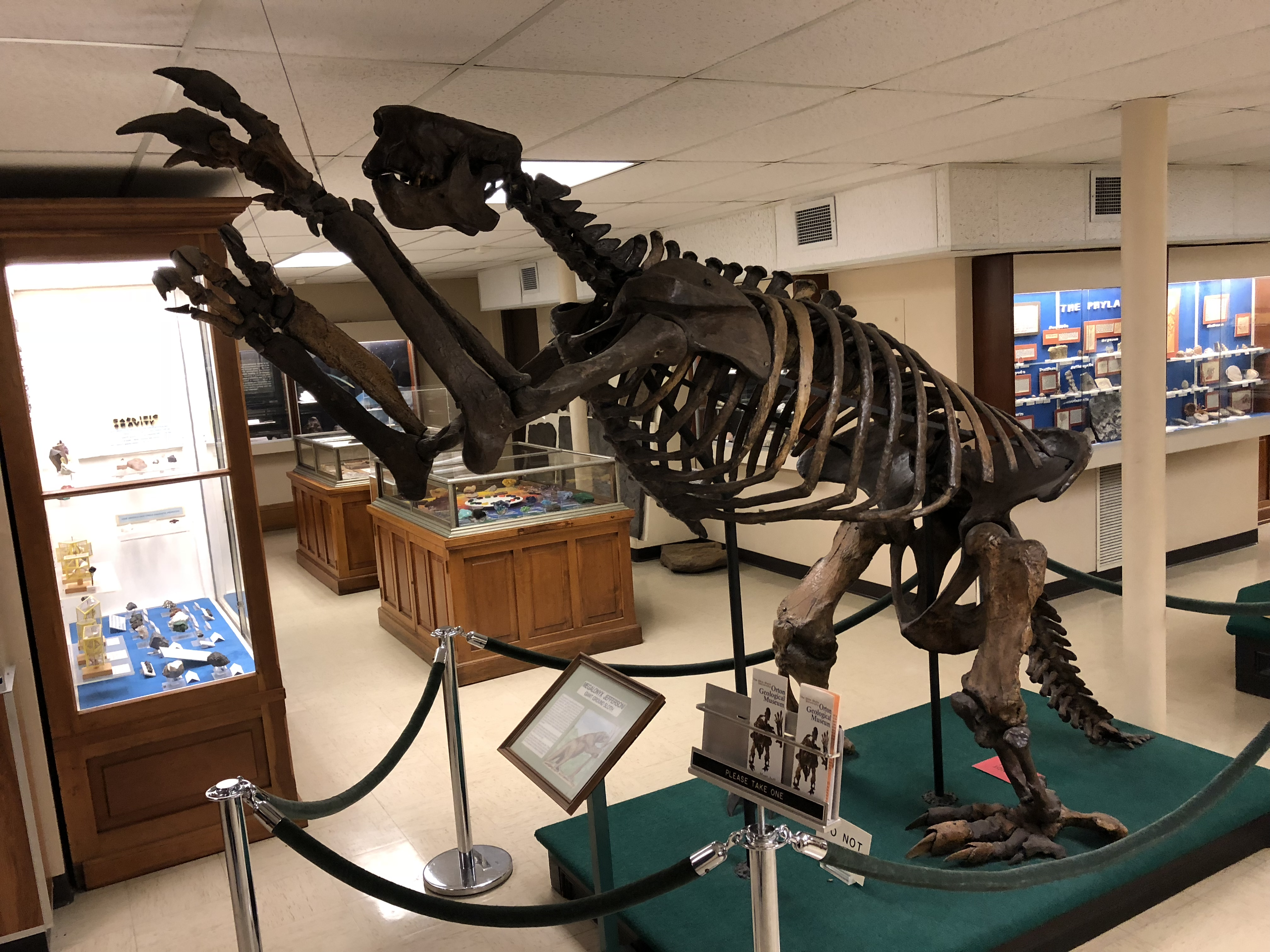
Megalonyx jeffersonii skeleton. Megalonyx mostly likely descended from Pliometanastes and was present in North America since the late Hemphillian.

The earliest undisputed record of Mammut sensu stricto was of M. nevadanum in the Thousand Creek Formation in Nevada. Coexistent with the mammutid species were a large variety of other mammals, namely those of the Artiodactyla (antilocaprids, camelids, tayassuids), Carnivora (canids, felids, mustelids, ursids), Eulipotyphla (talpids), Lagomorpha (leporids), Perissodactyla (equids, rhinocerotids), and Rodentia (aplodontiids, castorids, geomyids, heteromyids, cricetids, mylagaulids, and sciurids). The latest Hemphillian of Florida based on the Palmetto Fauna of the Bone Valley Formation records the coexistence of M. matthewi with similar types of faunas, namely Pilosa (megalonychids), Eulipotyphla (talpids), Lagomorpha (leporids), Carnivora (borophagine canids, canine canids, ursids, procyonids, mustelids including lutrines, feline felids, machairodontine felids), Proboscidea (gomphotheres), Perissodactyla (tapirs, rhinocerotids, hipparionine equids), and Artiodactyla (tayassuids, protoceratids, camelids, "pseudoceratines," cervids, antilocaprids). North America in the late Neogene is understood to have undergone a long-term decline in large mammal diversity (i.e. the Dromomerycidae, "Blastomerycinae," Rhinocerotidae) as a result of C_{4} grassland expansion, cooler climates, and increased seasonality.

The Blancan fossil record suggests a maximum known diversity of four species of Mammut (M. americanum, M. vexillarius, M. raki, and M. cosoensis). However, the Blancan record of Mammut is relatively rare. M. raki from the Palomas Formation of Truth or Consequences in New Mexico is recorded with a few other mammalian faunas, namely the megalonychid ground sloth Megalonyx, the pocket gopher Geomys, the cricetid Sigmodon, the equin Equus, the hipparionine Nannippus, and the camelid Camelops. A late Blancan locality known as the Fish Springs Flat Fauna in Nevada reveals that fossils of M. americanum were found with those of the leporid Hypolagus, lutrine Satherium, equid Equus, camelid Gigantocamelus, gopher Thomomys, and the ground squirrel Spermophilus.

In the Irvingtonian, only M. americanum is recorded to have crossed past the Blancan while M. pacificum replaced the other Blancan species. By this time, Mammut would have coexisted with the elephantid Mammuthus and the gomphotheres Cuvieronius and Stegomastodon, although the latter failed to survive past the early Irvingtonian. The Middle Pleistocene sites are scarce in North America compared to the Late Pleistocene sites, but from the Irvingtonian to the Rancholabrean, repeated glacial events occurred that led to repeated formations of major ice sheets in northern North America. The Port Kennedy Bone Cave of Pennsylvania is of Irvingtonian age (Middle Pleistocene) and reveals that during this time, M. americanum was present with the megalonychid Megalonyx wheatleyi, the tremarctine bear Arctodus pristinus, the jaguar (Panthera onca), the felid Miracinonyx inexpectatus, and the machairodontine Smilodon gracilis. The Big Bone Lick locality in Kentucky, which dates to the latest Pleistocene (Rancholabrean), indicates the coexistence of the American mastodon with the extant reindeer (Rangifer tarandus) along with various other extinct megafauna like ancient bison (Bison antiquus), the caprine bovid Bootherium bombifrons, mylodontid ground sloth Paramylodon harlani, megalonychid Megalonyx jeffersoni, true deer Cervalces scotti, equid Equus complicatus, and the Columbian mammoth.

== Relationship with humans ==
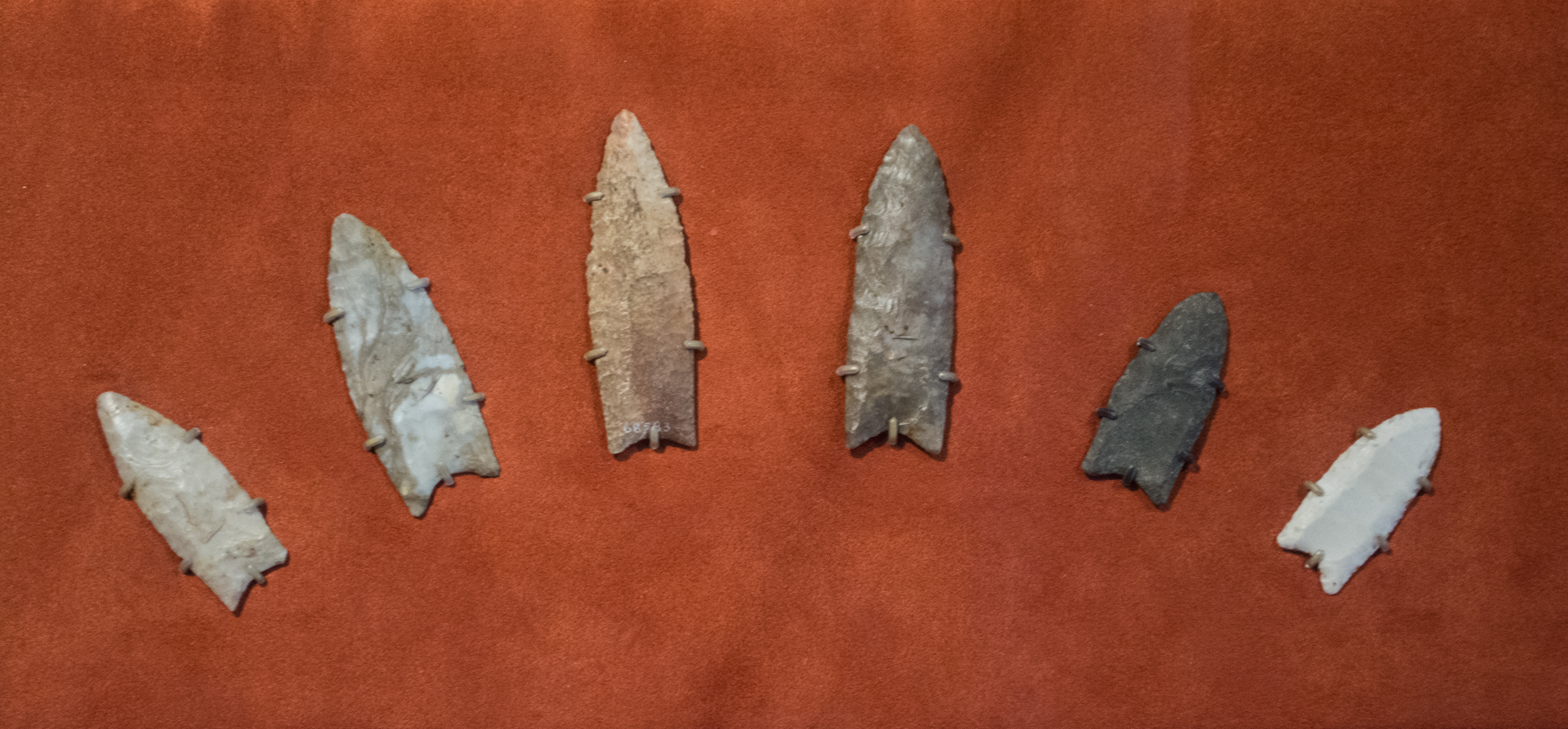
Clovis spearpoints, Cleveland Museum of Natural History

The exact timing of human (Homo sapiens) arrival to temperate North America is unclear, but they likely arrived in North America ∼19,000–14,000 calibrated years Before Present. They are known within the archeological record as Paleoindians and eventually gave rise to modern-day Native Americans. Of interest is that in the Clovis culture phase, there is evidence that Clovis hunters targeted contemporary proboscideans based on archeological "kill sites." Clovis projectile points and other artifacts have been found in association with both mammoths and mastodons. The former has more frequent evidence of having been hunted by Clovis hunters while mastodons have much fewer in comparison. Todd A. Surovell and Nicole M. Waguespack in 2008 hypothesized that Clovis hunters in North America hunted proboscideans more often than those in any other continent. They addressed that preservation biases of larger mammals in archeological sites may have caused higher representations of proboscidean kill sites but suggested that regardless, Clovis hunters were likely specialized in hunting large game.

As of present, 2 definite Mammut kill sites compatible with Clovis lithic technology have been recorded compared to 15 of Mammuthus and 1 of Cuvieronius. These two kill sites are thought to be from Kimmswick, Missouri and Pleasant Lake in Washtenaw County, Michigan. Whether various other sites can be confirmed as proboscidean butchery sites appear subjective, largely depending on the views of different authors. It is uncertain if Clovis people had hunting strategies of proboscideans similar to tribal Africans, but the Clovis points likely indicate usage as spears for thrusting or throwing at proboscideans (there are disagreements to whether they indicate multiple other usages, however).

According to the American paleontologist Daniel C. Fisher, the "Heisler mastodon" site in Calhoun County, Michigan, which recovered about 50% of the skeleton, was proof of meat caching in a pond by Paleoindians in the late Pleistocene. This hypothesis opposes the notion that proboscideans ended up unable to disentangle themselves in marsh wetlands, which he said there is no evidence of. His hypothesis was based on his experiment with partial carcasses of a horse that was preserved in a shallow lake then extracted as well as a Moravian missionary's testimony of Inuit retrieving caribou carcasses from lakes that they probably placed as storage in the cases of excess meat or future limited hunting successes. Fisher said that if his theory is true, then Paleoindian interactions with megafauna (hunting and scavenging) are far more complex than initially thought.

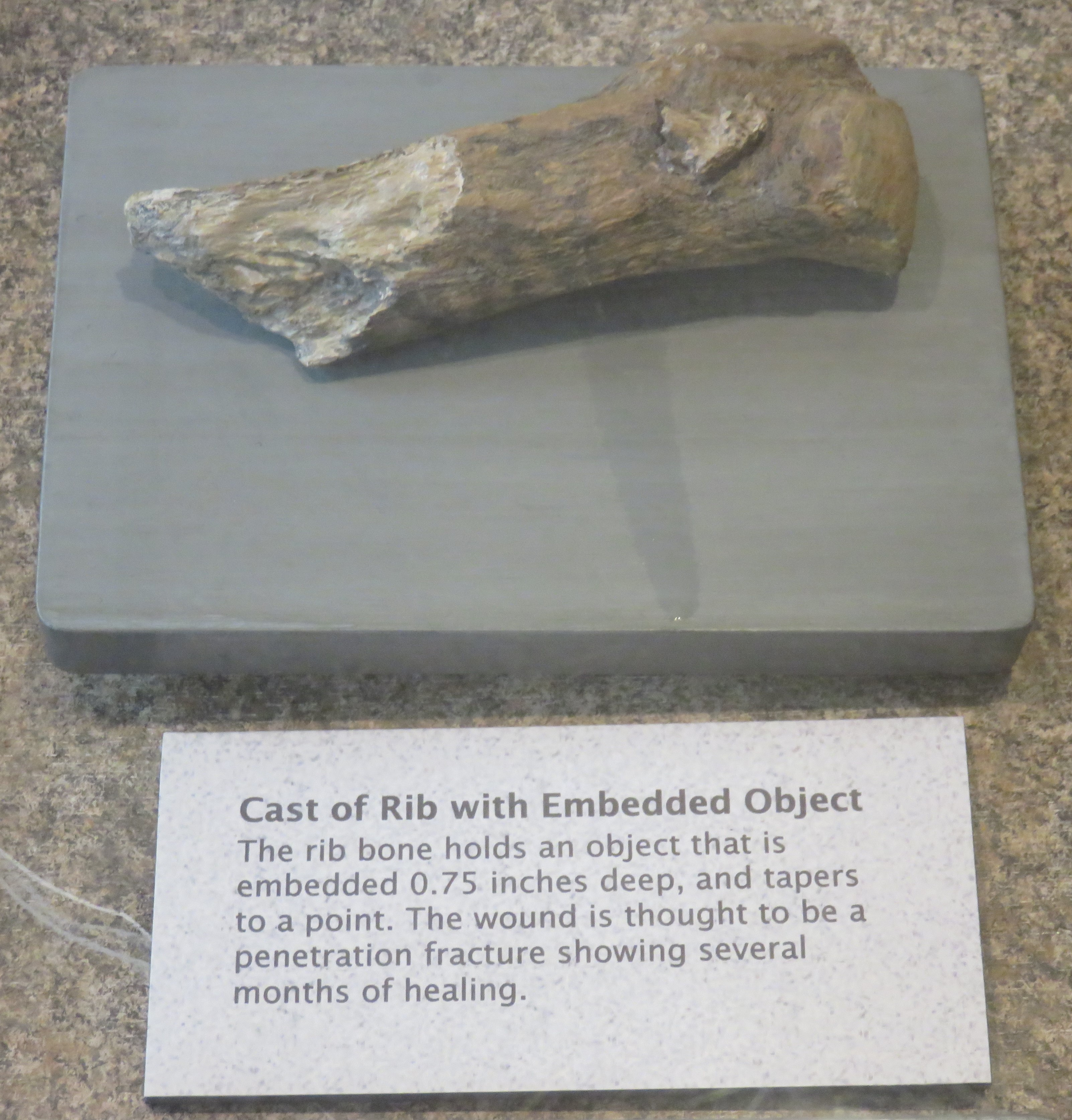
Cast of a right rib of the "Manis mastodon" with an embedded object and healed wound, Sequim Museum & Arts. The wound has been hypothesized to be the result of pre-Clovis hunting from several sources.

In 2023, Michael R. Waters et al. suggested that the Manis Mastodon site in Washington state supported evidence of a mastodon hunt ~13,900 cal. years BP, some 900 years before Clovis culture. Their study was a continuation of a 2011 anatomical study that proposed that osseous (bone) pieces found in a right rib of a mastodon represented fragmented tips of a projectile point, but it had been repeatedly challenged by other authors. Based on anatomical reevaluations, they determined that the bone fragments were embedded in the Manis mastodon rib while it was alive, as evident by the visible healing around the wounded area. Waters and his colleagues stated that the bone pieces were from an external source, explainable by human-made projectile points. They rejected alternate explanations for why bone fragments ended up in the Manis mastodon rib. Based on this, they envisioned that the mastodon individual was wounded by pre-Clovis hunters and got away, giving it time to heal. Afterwards, it died either by natural causes and was scavenged by humans, or it was killed by them on another attack then butchered. This site proves the existence of pre-Clovis hunting technology that the earliest people brought with them when dispersing to North America and made localized adaptations of.

In 2017, Steven R. Holen et al. published an article arguing that the Cerutti Mastodon site, located in San Diego County in California, is an archeological site involving M. americanum that dates to approximately 130,000 years ago. If true, they stated, the site would imply evidence of now-extinct species of Homo in North America during the Marine Isotope Stage 5 (MIS 5e) temporal range of the early late Pleistocene. The proposal was highly controversial, as many archeologists were skeptical about the claim that the bones of M. americanum were broken by hominins, and alternate explanations have been offered. For instance, in the same year the article was published, Gary Haynes expressed concern of it being published in the journal Nature due to how highly prolific it is. Reporters from print presses and digital media published reactions of the article from various North American archeologists, with Donald K. Grayson stating that it was astonishingly bad, Jon M. Erlandson arguing that the site was non-credible, and various other archeologists arguing that the claim is insufficiently supported. Haynes pointed out that the article's claim was "extraordinary" and must therefore be met with rigorous skepticism. He wrote that there were no traces of archeological structures typically built by archaic species of Homo (i.e. H. erectus, Neanderthals, or Denisovans) in the Cerutti site. Additionally, he brought up the possibilities of the fossil bones being affected by sediment pressures or damage done by earth-moving construction equipments despite the original authors denying the latter possibility.

Multiple petroglyphs suggested to have depicted prehistoric proboscideans in North America like mastodons are known within the United States, but they are either fraudulent or depict entities other than mastodons. As a result, suggested rock art of mammoths and mastodons within North America are not sufficiently credible.

== Extinction ==
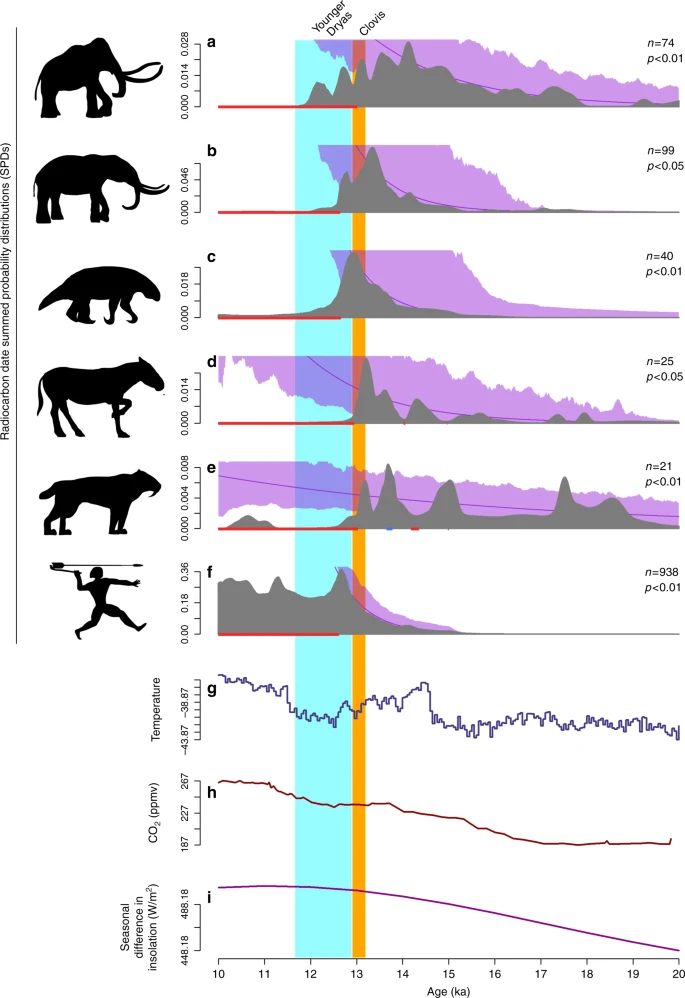
Summed probability distributions (SPDs) of Mammuthus, Mammut, Nothrotheriops, Equus, Smilodon, and humans in the latest Pleistocene of the United States

Mammut, or more specifically the American mastodon, experienced an initial decline in geographical range when it was extirpated from the northernmost ranges of North America ~75,000 years ago. Mammut initially occupied the region during the Last Interglacial (~125,000–75,000 years ago) back when suitable forested habitats were present there but was subsequently extirpated in correlation with environmental changes from the Wisconsin glaciation (MIS 4). The local extirpation, occurring long before human arrival, caused the mastodon range to be limited to areas south of North American ice sheets. The steppe-tundra faunas thrived there during the event whereas boreal forest-adapted faunas underwent declines. The trend of recolonization and extirpation appears to have had been a recurring trend in the Pleistocene correlated with repeated returns of forests and wetlands, but what is unclear is why faunas that were able to repeatedly recolonize northern North America during previous interglacial periods were unable to do so again after the Last Glacial Maximum.

The latest Pleistocene of North America records a large extinction phase that resulted in the disappearances of over 30 genera of mammals, the majority of which are considered "megafauna" (~45 kg (99 lb) or larger). Mammut was one of the many genera recorded within North America whose extinction causes are currently unresolved. During the latest Pleistocene of North America, two major events occurred: the development of Clovis culture from 13,200 to 12,800 years ago and the onset of the Younger Dryas cold phase from 12,900 to 11,700 years ago. The extinctions of mammalian megafauna in North America are particularly high akin to those of South America and Australia rather than Eurasia and Africa. As a result, the extinctions that occurred in the latest Pleistocene of North America have been mainly attributed to human hunting, climate change, or some combination of the two (there are alternate but lesser-supported hypotheses). Many researchers have struggled to explain the North American extinctions, with both human hunting and climate change explanations alone being challenged. In recent years, research has shifted towards studying the extinctions of North American faunas by individual taxon and/or region rather as a homogenous group. The results vary in regions such as the northeast, with some authors suggesting that there was minimal evidence for Clovis hunting being the major factor behind proboscidean population drops and some others arguing that environmental shifts prior to human arrival were not detrimental enough to the proboscideans.

Paul L. Koch and Anthony D. Barnosky in 2006 suggested that Mammuthus was well-associated with archeological sites of North America. In comparison, Mammut and the peccary Platygonus were far less frequently associated with human sites, potentially suggesting that Paleoindians hunted them less than mammoths. They stated that the current understanding of Mammut associations with humans could shift if the supposed butchery sites were better understood while that of Platygonus is stable and therefore unlikely to change. In 2018, Jack M. Broughton and Elic M. Weitzel calculated populated dynamics of some of the North American late Pleistocene megafauna based on summed probability distributions (SPDs) using calibrated radiocarbon dates. They determined based on the data that the declines of Mammuthus, Equus, and Smilodon were correlated with Clovis culture hunting while Mammut and the nothrotheriid ground sloth Nothrotheriops did not exhibit any significant population bust until after Clovis culture and during the Younger Dryas at ~12,650 years ago. They concluded that the declines of megafauna are of mixed causes and that the extinction processes and causes therefore vary by individual taxon and region.

An outlier terminal date for the survival of mastodon was reported for the Overmyer Mastodon individual from northern Indiana, which was dated by Neal Woodman and Nancy Beaven Athfield to be between 11,795 to 11,345 calendar years old with a median date of 11,576 calibrated years old. Such late dates would put the individual at the Younger Dryas/Early Holocene boundary and well after both Clovis and the initial onset of the Younger Dryas. However, according to a newer study by Widga et al. (2017), the published dates by Woodman and Athfield could not be replicated through re-dating, which instead returned a calibrated date between 13,073 to 12,726 years old. This puts it in line with traditional ages for the youngest mastodon fossils found on the continent and greatly reduces the possibility of mastodon survival into the Holocene.

== Cultural significance ==
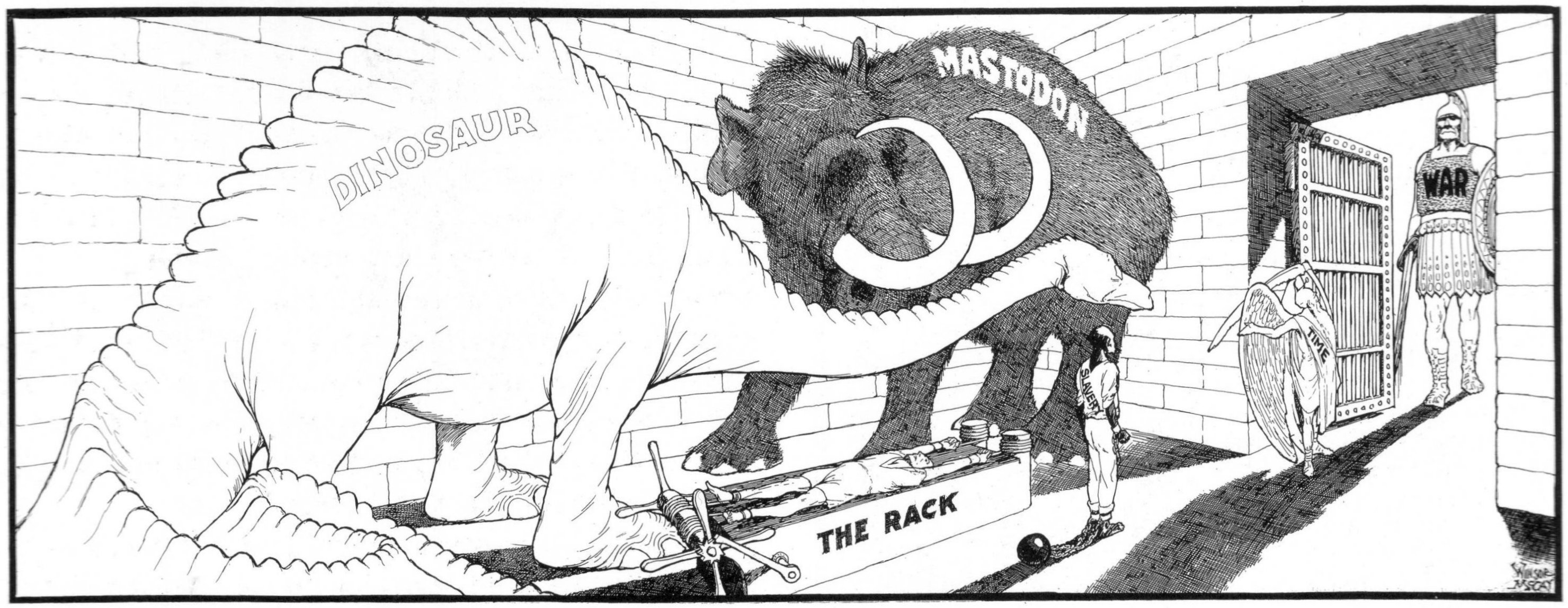
Political cartoon "Oblivion's Cave—Step Right In, Please" by Winsor McCay, 1922

Late Pleistocene proboscideans of the Americas such as the American mastodon could have been recognized in Native American oral histories, but they are unlikely to have referenced any specific species. Typically, they may have been depicted in Native American oral history as aggressive and antagonistic beasts. Mastodons may have played ancient roles in Native American cultures of the Pacific Northwest. In 1987, Carl E. Gustafson recovered fossil evidence of a late Pleistocene mastodon far away from where the species would typically roam, the radiocarbon dating confirming a date of about 13,800 years ago. The local tribal members identified the remains as being of game pieces for slahal, a gambling game for dispute settlements and entertainment. The bone sticks, carved from mastodon bones, are not easily interpretable archeologically, but tribal members saw the recovery of the items as evidence of the endurance of ancient cultural practices like slahal.

The American mastodon had long been a stand-in within the United States for American nationalism since early American history, and Thomas Jefferson was famously known for having hoped that the Lewis and Clark Expedition would eventually yield evidence of living mastodons in the western frontier of the United States. It was a defining symbol of museums according to Brett Barney as evident by a mention of it by Walt Whitman in a passage of the 1855 poem "Song of Myself."

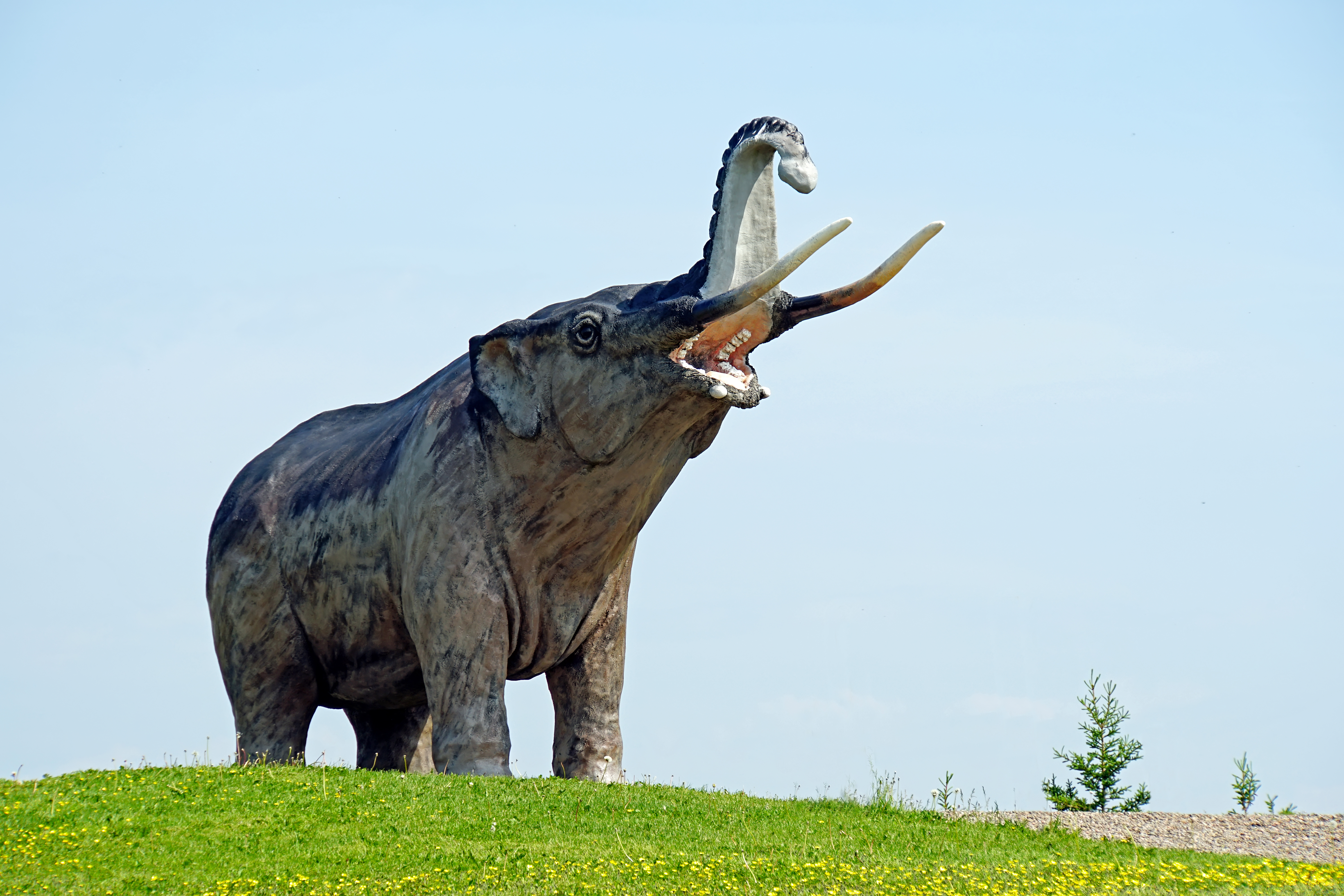
Mastodon replica at the Mastodon Ridge park in Stewiacke, Nova Scotia, Canada

The mastodon became the subject of a Michigan political campaign in 2000 when Washtenaw Community College geology instructor David P. Thomas Sr. aimed to make it the state fossil of Michigan. He, assisted by the Slauson Middle School science teacher Jeffrey Bradley, was sponsored by the state senator Thaddeus McCotter, arranged petition drives that collected thousands of signatures, and attended state hearings. Bradley's students participated in the "Mastodon for Michigan" campaign, which built a life-sized replica out of paper and raised $1,000 for the University of Michigan Museum of Natural History to build a mastodon exhibit. In 2002, the mastodon became the state fossil, making it the fourteenth state symbol. Similarly, the mastodon became the state fossil of Indiana as recently as 2022 due to House Bill 1013, authored by the representative Randy Frye, passing unanimously.

In January 2024, Indiana senator Mike Braun and Michigan senator Gary Peters introduced a bipartisan bill to make the mastodon the US national fossil is what is called the "National Fossil Act." Section 1 aims to define the bill's name, Section 2 would investigate the roles of the mastodon in American public life, and Section 3 would designate it as the national fossil under Title 36 of the United States Code. Peters justified that the mastodon represents a unique aspect of Michigan's history and American history, stating that he hoped that its establishment as the national fossil would preserve the histories and encourage new generations of scientists and other researchers to pursue their goals.

Located in the Mastodon Ridge park in the Canadian town of Stewiacke, Nova Scotia is a large-sized replica of a mastodon based on a skeleton recovered from Nova Scotia. It was sculpted as a clay model, has a weight of ~1,400 kg (3,100 lb), is 3.5 m (11 ft) in shoulder height, and measures 7.5 m (25 ft) long. The sculpture took about 8 weeks to be constructed and was sent to the Mastodon Ridge in January 1995.

The name "mastodon" was adopted in different contexts within the United States. For instance, 4-8-0 locomotives of the late 19th century were originally named "Mastodons" before the name was eventually replaced with "12-wheeler." The name was a reference to the American mastodon. The 4-10-0 locomotive later became known also as "Mastodon." In the 1993-1995 show Mighty Morphin Power Rangers, the Black Ranger Zack Taylor had the mastodon ability and controlled the Mastodon Dinozord machine (in the Japanese series from which it was adapted, Kyōryū Sentai Zyuranger, his counterpart Goushi instead had a mammoth motif). The name "Mastodon" was also adopted by a heavy metal band when guitarist Bill Kelliher was asked by the guitarist-singer Brent Hinds about the name of the "fossil elephant" after seeing his tattoo of a Bantha skull from the Star Wars franchise, in which the members then agreed to it being the band's name. "Mastodon" is also the name of a blogging social network site that also acquired its name from the extinct proboscidean species. The mastodon is the mascot of the Massachusetts College of Art and Design.

== See also ==
- Big Bone Lick State Park
- Cerutti Mastodon site
- Coats–Hines site
- List of museums and colleges with mastodon fossils on display
- Manis Mastodon site
- Snowmastodon site
