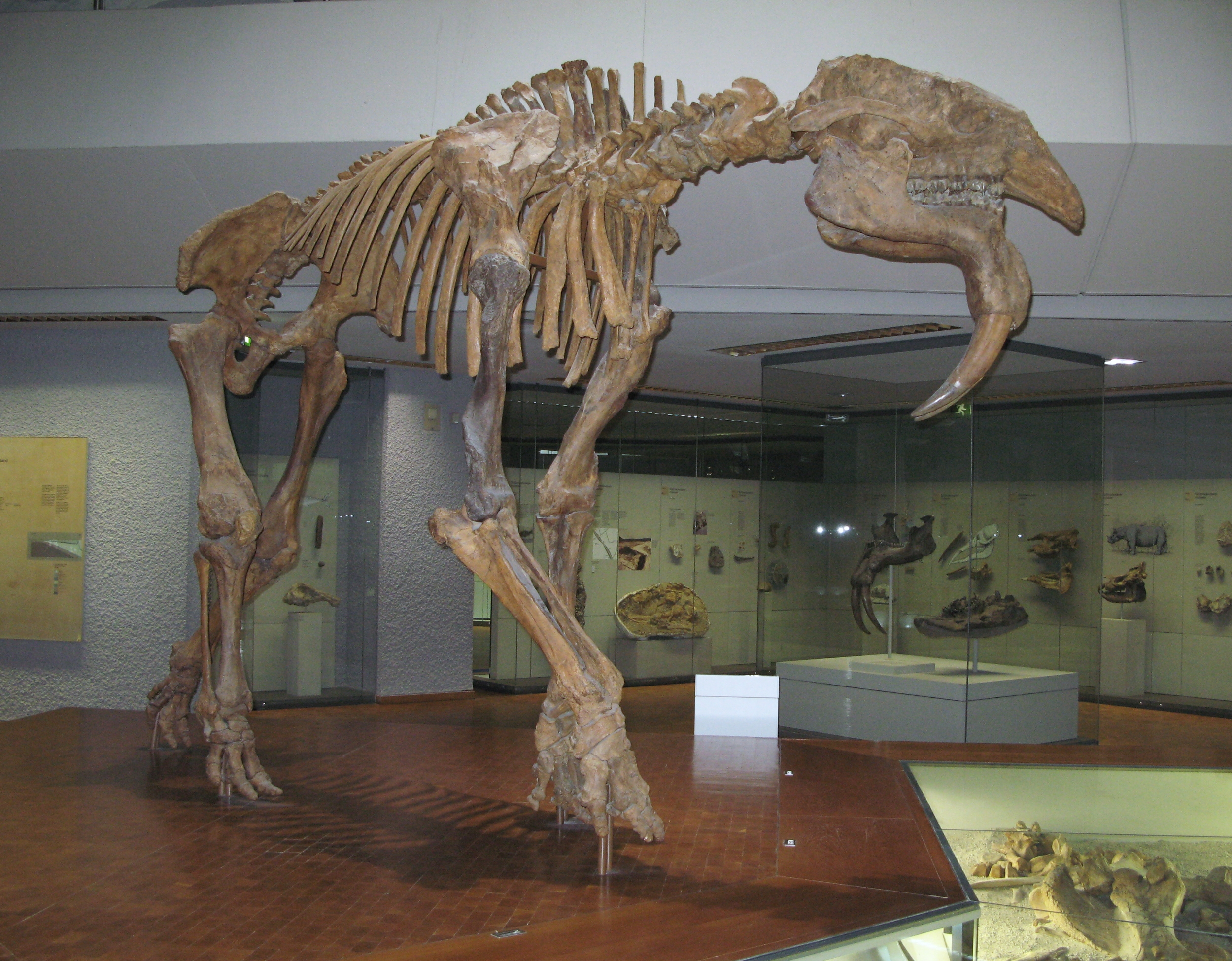
- Prodeinotherium bavaricum

Scientific classification
- Kingdom: Animalia
- Phylum: Chordata
- Class: Mammalia
- Order: Proboscidea
- Family: †Deinotheriidae
- Subfamily: †Deinotheriinae
- Genus: †Prodeinotherium; Ehik, 1930

Species
- P. bavaricum (Meyer, 1831); P. hobleyi (Andrews, 1911); P. pentapotamiae (Falconer, 1868); P. sinense Qiu et al., 2007

Synonyms
- Prodinotherium Ehik, 1930 P. bavaricum: Deinotherium bavaricum Meyer, 1831; Dinotherium cuvieri Kaup, 1832; Dinotherium bavaricum Meyer, 1833; Deinotherium secundarium Lartet, 1836; Prodeinotherium hungaricum Ehik, 1930; Prodeinotherium petenyii Vörös, 1989; P. pentapotamiae: Dinotherium pentapotamiae Falconer, 1868; Deinotherium orlovii Sahni & Tripathi, 1957; Prodeinotherium orlovii (Sahni & Tripathi, 1957); P. hobleyi: Dinotherium hobleyi Andrews, 1911

= Prodeinotherium =

Prodeinotherium Temporal range: 20.5–15.5 Ma

Extinct genus of proboscideans

Prodeinotherium is an extinct representative of the family Deinotheriidae that lived in Africa, Europe, and Asia in the early and middle Miocene. Prodeinotherium, meaning "before terrible beast", was first named in 1930, but soon after, the only species in it, P. hungaricum, was reassigned to Deinotherium. During the 1970s, however, the two genera were once again separated, with Prodeinotherium diagnosed to include Deinotherium bavaricum (=P. hungaricum), Deinotherium hobleyi, and Deinotherium pentapotamiae, which were separated based on geographic location. The three species are from Europe, Africa, and Asia, respectively. However, because of usage of few characters to separate them, only one species, P. bavaricum, or many more species, including P. cuvieri, P. orlovii, and P. sinense may be possible.

Prodeinotherium is one of three genera of the Deinotheriidae, the others being Chilgatherium from Africa, and Deinotherium from Europe, Africa, and Asia. Chilgatherium preceded Prodeinotherium, while Deinotherium succeeded it. P. hobleyi was the first species of Prodeinotherium, and it migrated into Asia and Europe before evolving into P. pentapotamiae and then P. bavaricum. Prodeinotherium lived for the Early Miocene and Middle Miocene before being replaced by Deinotherium. The deinotheriids are an early branch of proboscideans, although more derived than Barytherium and Moeritherium.

All deinotheres were large animals that evolved to be even larger, and many features are shared throughout the group. Prodeinotherium and Deinotherium both had large, downcurved tusks on the lower jaw, but none on the upper jaw. This could have been used to grasp food while the tusks moved branches out of the way. Prodeinotherium was slightly smaller than Deinotherium, yet much larger than more primitive proboscideans. All Prodeinotherium species were similar in size, ranging from 2.5 to 2.8 m (8.2 to 9.2 ft) tall and weighing about 3.1 to 4.3 t (490 to 680 st).

== Description ==
Prodeinotherium was the size of the present Asian elephant, but differing from elephants by lacking upper tusks and instead possessing downward-facing lower tusks. In appearance and many characters, it was like Deinotherium, but differed in being of smaller size, having shorter fore limbs, and also in various details in the shape and form of the teeth. A potentially adult female specimen of P. bavaricum is estimated to be 2.47 m (8.1 ft) tall and weigh 3.1 t (3.1 long tons; 3.4 short tons), while an adult male measured 2.78 m (9.1 ft) tall and was about 4.3 t (4.2 long tons; 4.7 short tons). The earliest species P. hobleyi was estimated at similar 2.7 m (8.9 ft) tall and 4.0 t (3.9 long tons; 4.4 short tons). Prodeinotherium hobleyi was larger and more specialised than its Oligocene predecessor Chilgatherium. It flourished for several millions of years, before being replaced in the middle Miocene by the much larger Deinotherium.

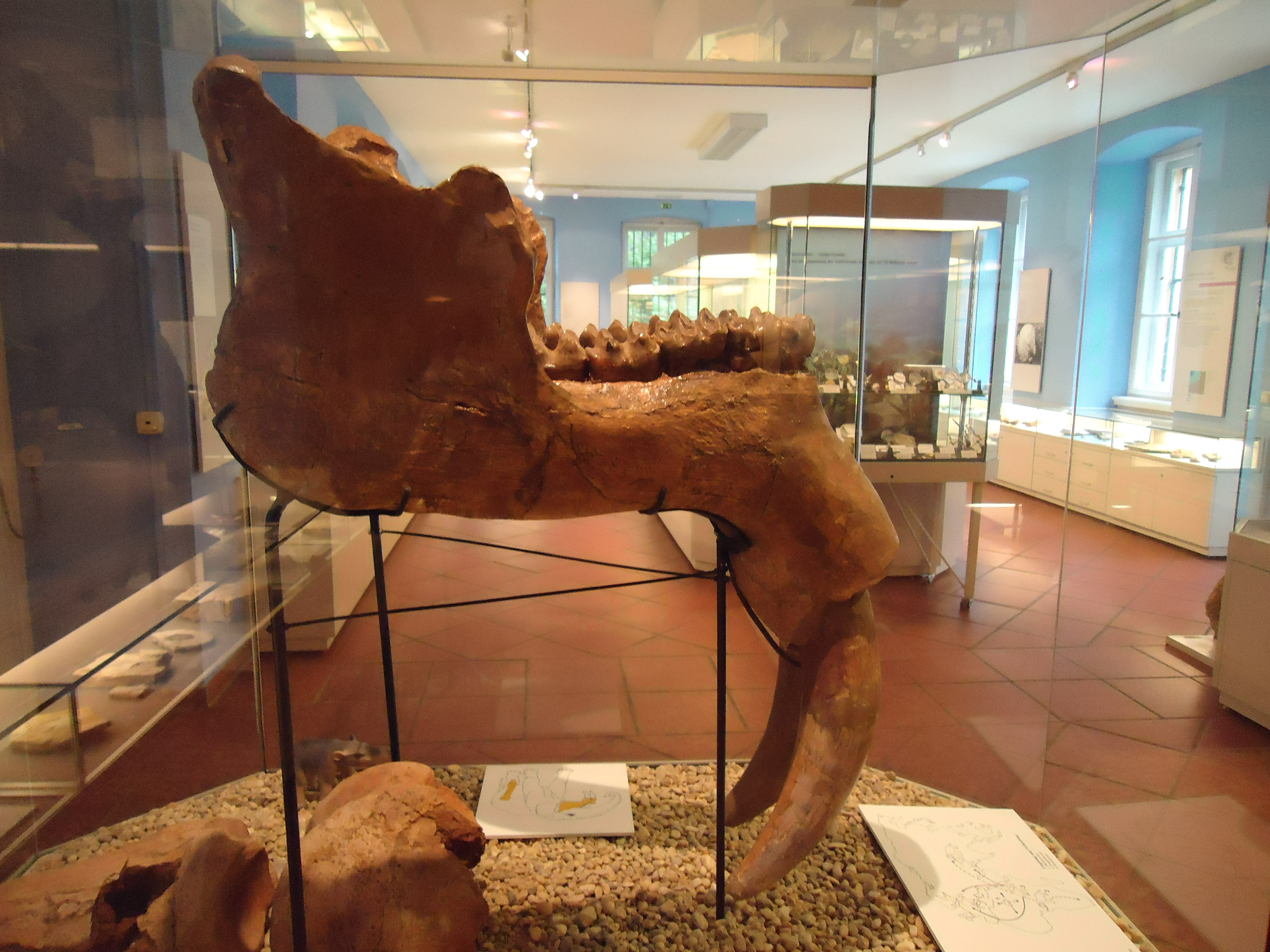
Lateral view of the lower jaws of P. bavaricum at Naturkundemuseum Ostbayern

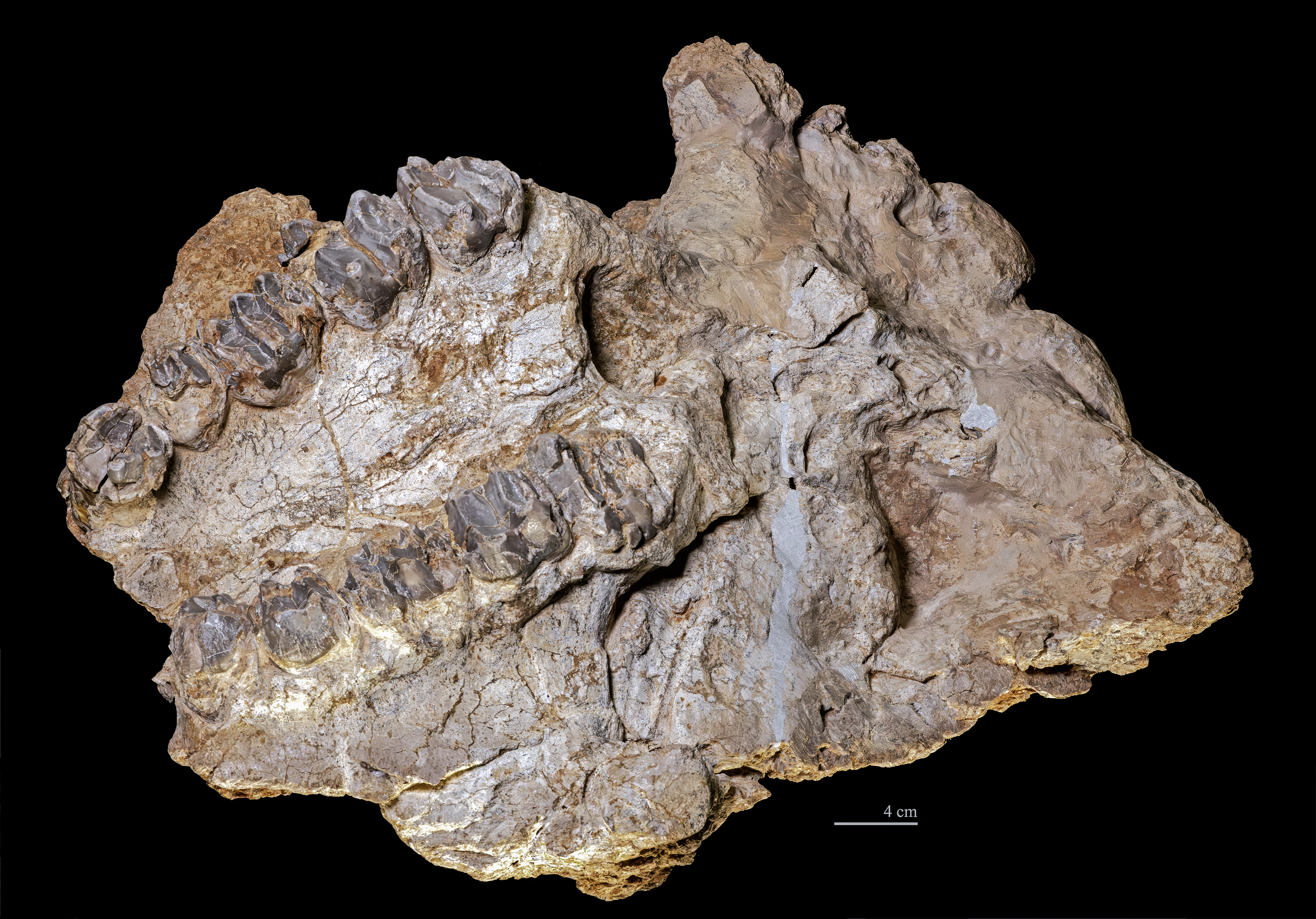
Skull, and palate MHNT

Tusk MHNT

Prodeinotherium is distinguished from Deinotherium from multiple features, including possessing a different dental formula of 003/103 and 0023/1023; M2-3 with an ornamentation; the rostrum turns down parallel to the mandibular symphysis; the rostrum and external nares narrow; the swelling of the preorbital is close to the orbit; the roof of the skull is longer and wider than in Deinotherium; the articulation between the neck vertebrae and skull is more upturned; the skeleton is graviportally adapted; the scapula has a prominent spine and a stout acromion and metacromion; and the carpal bones and tarsal bones are narrow, but not dolichopodous.

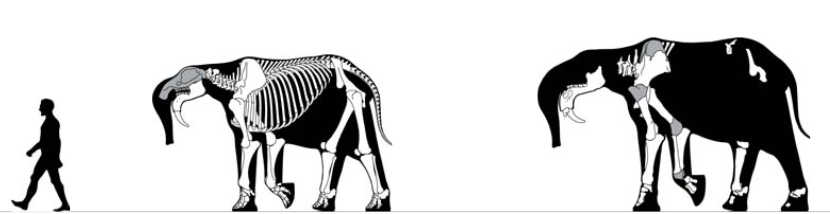
Skeletal reconstructions of P. bavaricum female (left), male (right)

Deinotheres such as Prodeinotherium have a muscle attachment for a trunk-like structure. However, instead of an elephant-like trunk, the appendage was more muscular and similar to a tapirs snout. Within the evolution of Deinotheriidae, the paired "tongs" arrangement consisting of upper and lower incisors possessed by earlier Proboscideans was lost.

P. bavaricum, fossils of which come from the Upper Freshwater Molasse, is the most well-studied species of Prodeinotherium, with multiple features shared among all specimens, not necessarily to the exclusion of other species. Some of these features include "small size, generally simple dental structure, less enamel plication and crenulation, ... thus the valleys of the premolars are well separated, slender teeth, bicuspid mesial lophid in P3 (the cuspids are distinct but more compressed against each other than in P. hobleyi), and clear mesial projection ("preprotolophide") in P3; sometimes is bicuspid." Other features noted earlier in 1957 include "the mesial lophid of P3 is well separated into two cuspids, the mesial projection of P3 is well developed and often bicuspid, and the base of the protoconid in P3 is longer than that of the metaconid." P. hobleyi differs in morphology from P. bavaricum mostly in these P3 characteristics.

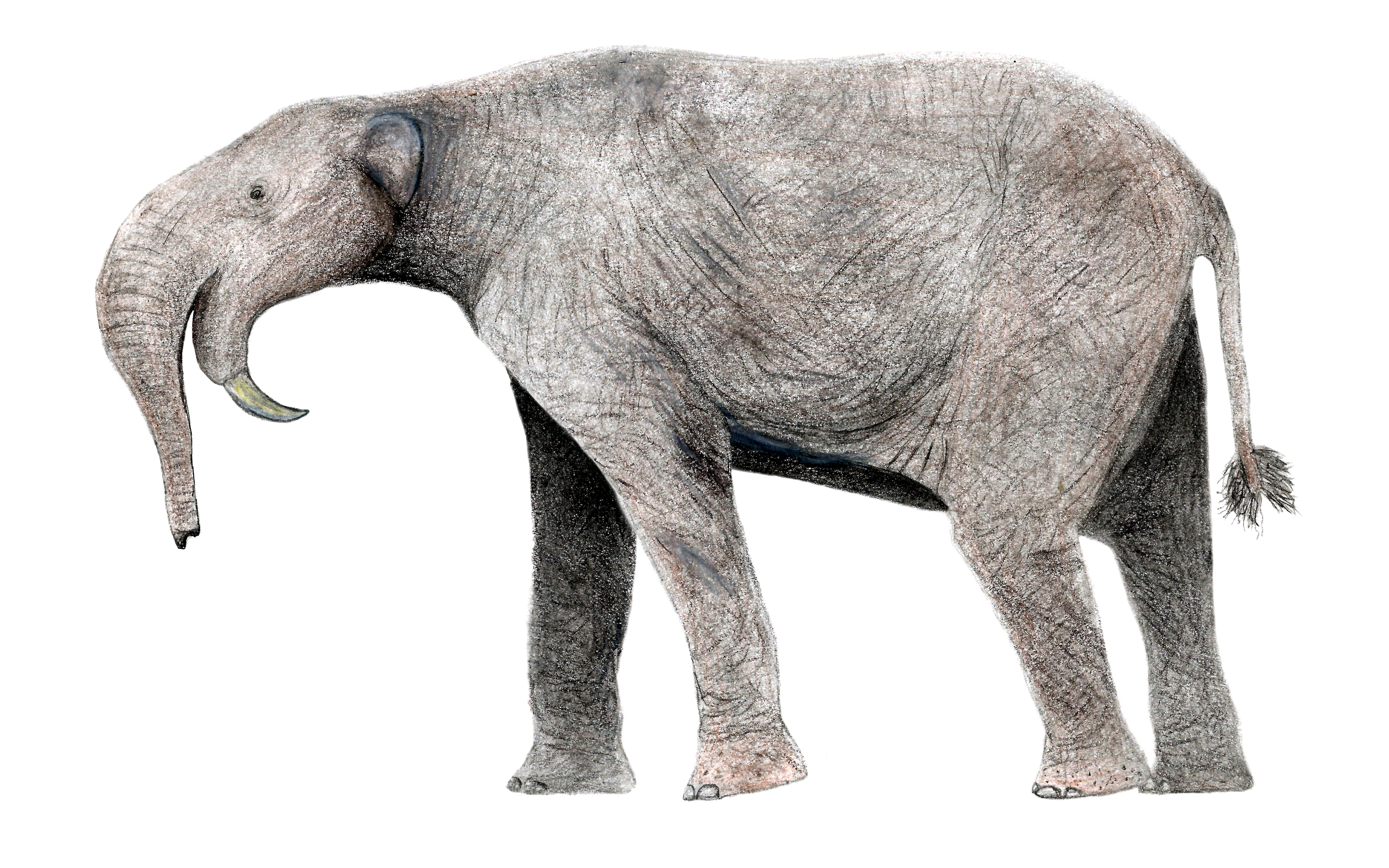
Life restoration of P. bavaricum based on the Unterzolling specimen.

All deinothere mandibles have the same basic anatomy, with a downturned symphysis, and lower incisors. Most differences of deinothere genera are in the P3 tooth morphology and dimensions of the mandible and teeth. Measurements of the mandible have shown that the curve of the jaw is relative to the length of the jaw; a longer jaw means a stronger curve. A distinguishing feature of Prodeinotherium is that the area at the base of the curve in the jaw is flat, while a depression is seen in all specimens of Deinotherium.

== Taxonomy and evolution ==
Prodeinotherium lived during the Early Miocene and Middle Miocene, about 19.0 to 18.0 million years ago (Mya). Prodeinotherium likely evolved from Chilgatherium, or the common ancestor of the two genera. The earliest remains of Prodeinotherium come from Kenya, where two deposits preserving the genus date to 22.5 and 19.5 Mya according to one 1978 study. The same study found that fossils from Uganda date to 20.0 Mya. However, more recent studies (from 1988, 1991, and 2002) find that the deposits date to >17.9, 19.5, and 17.0 Mya, respectively. After evolving in Africa, Prodeinotherium spp. likely migrated into Asia and then Europe with the formation of the "Gomphotherium land bridge". Prodeinotherium may have gone extinct around 15.5 Mya, based on the last known fossils from the Arabian Peninsula. P. hobleyi was the first species to evolve, followed soon after P. pentapotamiae and then P. bavaricum around the same time. These species are from Africa, Europe, and South Asia, respectively. Prodeinotherium was replaced in Asia by Deinotherium indicum, in Europe by D. giganteum, and in Africa by D. bozasi. The easternmost occurrence of the genus appears to be Prodeinotherium sinensis in the province of Gansu, Northwest China.

Deinotheres are quite controversial with regards to the systematics. Many species have been named, yet major studies by Harris and Huttunen find that only three species in each genus are valid, based on distribution and smaller details. Within Prodeinotherium, the species found valid by these authors include P. bavaricum, P. pentapotamiae, and P. hobleyi. Many descriptions of new species of deinotheres are based upon limited material compared to only a small number of the species. Thus, many species of deinotheres are no longer valid. In addition to invalid species, Prodeinotherium has on occasion been synonymized with Deinotherium. Species of Prodeinotherium found to be valid by multiple studies include P. cuvieri, P. sinense, and P. orlovii. In a study 2011 analyzed the mandibles of multiple genera in a phylogenetic analysis. Their results are shown below:

- Proboscidea
  - Phosphatherium
  - - - Numidotherium
      - Barytherium
    - - Moeritherium
      - - Prodeinotherium
        - Elephantiformes
          - Palaeomastodon
          - - Phiomia
            - - Hemimastodon
              - Elephantimorpha

== History of discovery ==
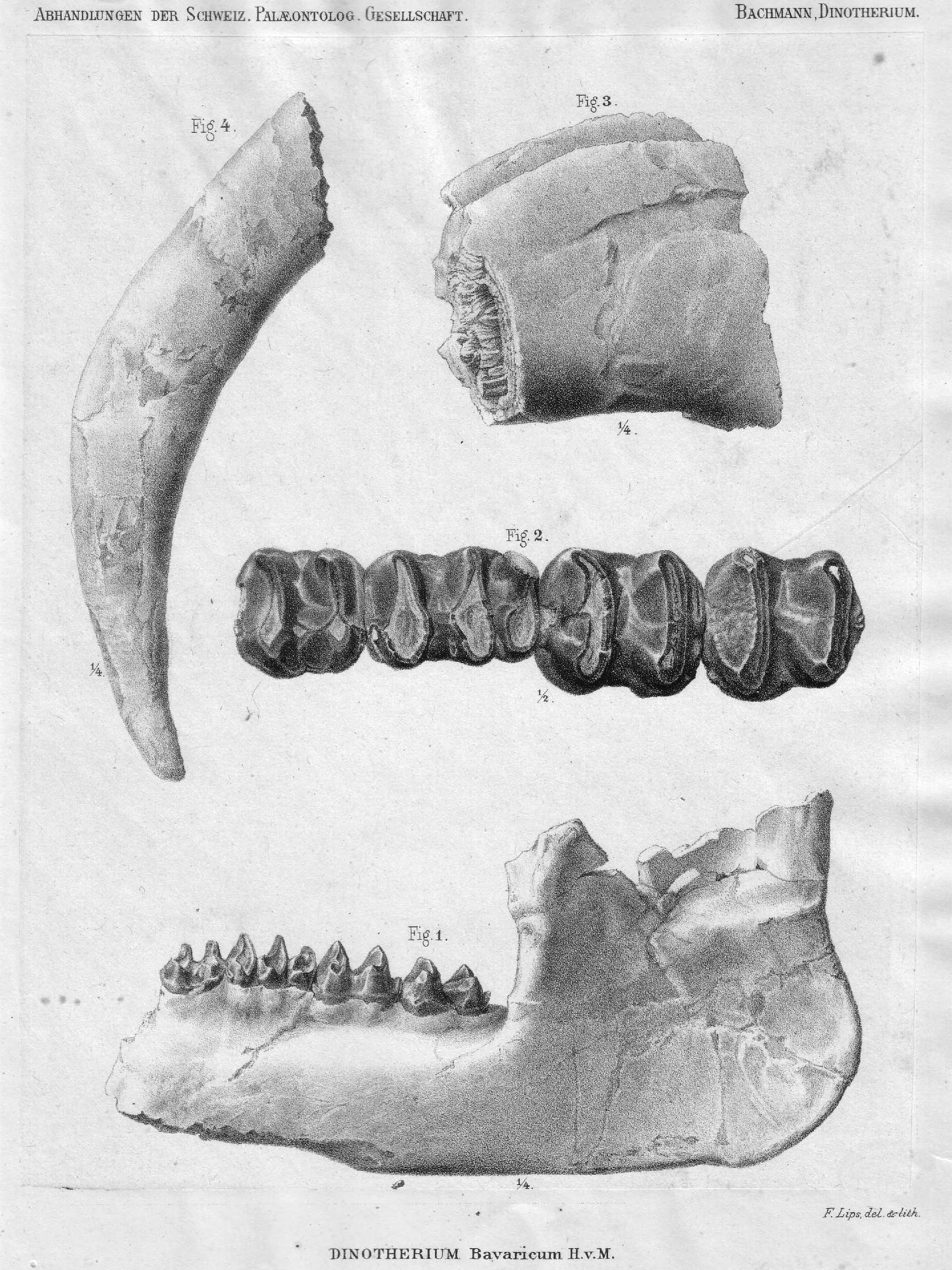
Skull bones of P. bavaricum, illustrated in 1875

Deinotherium bavaricum was originally mentioned in a paper by Christian Erich Hermann von Meyer in 1831. However, his first description of the material came in 1833, in which he also created the new species Dinotherium bavaricum, the accidental change in genus spelling making it a lapsus calami. The material known is the lectotype P3, in the Bayerische Staatssammlung für Paläontologie und historische Geologie, selected from a group of specimens (a syntype) from Bavaria. Meyer compared the tooth to the material of Deinotherium gigantium, and found enough features to distinguish it as a separate species. Most deinotheres were lumped into Deinotherium until the studies of Harris, who concluded that morphology separated them into two genera, Prodeinotherium and Deinotherium. As the earliest description of a small deinothere in Europe, P. bavaricum became the type species of Prodeinotherium. Prodeinotherium was named in 1830 by Ehik, and its name is derived from pro – "before" Deinotherium – "terrible beast".

Another early description of Prodeinotherium is that of Kaup (1832). He described teeth previously assigned to Tapir gigantesque, finding them to be a new deinothere. Kaup assigned these to Dinotherium cuvieri, using size to distinguish it from D. giganteum. However, the size, morphology, and distribution match that of P. bavaricum, thus the latter became the senior synonym. Later in 1836, Lartet described yet another deinothere that eventually became P. bavaricum. This new species was named Deinotherium secondarium, for teeth from France. Lartet published no description, and did not mention this species in later works. Huttunen showed that the distribution of D. secondarium was within that of P. bavaricum, thus considered the two species likely synonymous. Later, Ehik (1930) described the genus and the new species Prodinotherium hungaricum, misspelling the genus name. The species was known from a jaw with teeth and some post cranial elements. This material was from Királd, and was destroyed, but casts of it remain in the Hungarian Natural History Museum. Diagnosed by dental features, and post cranial morphology, the specimen was later found similar to specimens from elsewhere in Europe, which were assigned to P. bavaricum. Harris found P. hungaricum to be a synonym of P. bavaricum, a conclusion followed by Huttunen. P. petenyii was described in 1989 by Vörös, who found it to differ from all other Prodeinotherium species. From Hungary, the material includes a jaw with teeth. The tooth morphology is very similar to that of P. bavaricum, and although the species has the unique feature of tusks that do not curve down and instead project forwards, Huttunen considered it a synonym of P. bavaricum.

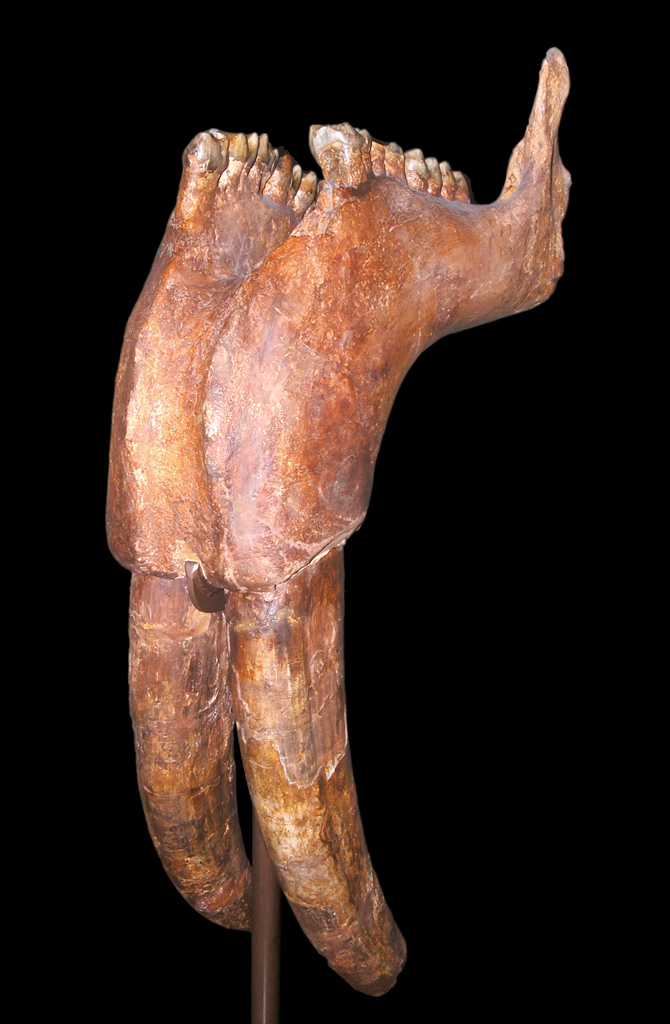
Lower jaw of P. bavaricum

In 1868, Hugh Falconer's notes from before his death were published, including the description of material that he labelled Dinotherium pentapotamiae. This was from the Sewalik of India, he noted that the teeth were possibly the same as D. indium, but were within the range of a midsized individual. This presumption as D. indium was based on the possibility that D. giganteum was the only species of Deinotherium in Europe, and the variation of individuals of Mastodon longirostris within a population. This species was later reassigned to Prodeinotherium, distinct from D. indicum.

The African species, P. hobleyi, was first described in 1911 by Charles William Andrews. The species was from East Africa, and was named Dinotherium hobleyi. Andrews described these remains, which included a mandible with teeth, a calcaneum, a patella, and other indeterminable fragments, shipped to him by C.W. Hobley. It was compared to Dinotherium cuvieri, and although they were similar, the minor differences and geographical separation were enough for Andrews to create a new species. This species was later reassigned to Prodeinotherium, as the only species from Africa.

P. sinense was described in 2007 as a late species of Prodeinotherium; it was described by Qui et al., and is known from dental material and jaw. It was first found in 2005, in Gansu, China. It is of a Late Miocene age, thus is younger than other Prodeinotherium species. That study also found that the material of P. hungaricum is distinct from P. bavaricum. A study in 2010 by Vergiev & Markow noted that the teeth are quite similar to those of Deinotherium, and based on these features and age the species was thought to either be a species in between Prodeinotherium and Deinotherium, or belonging to the latter genus.

Early depictions of deinotheres such as Prodeinotherium were scientifically incorrect. Before postcranial material was known, the genera were considered to be rhinos, giant tapirs, sirenians, whales, and marsupials. However, with postcranial material came the proposal of an elephantine relation. However, early depictions of deinotheres were too elephantine, practically only with the addition of lower tusks. These restorations were inaccurate, because they showed the lower lip directly beneath the trunk, with the tusks projecting from the "chin". According to a 2001 study, the tusks more likely projected above the lip, which followed the curvature of the jaw down. Another inaccuracy is likely the length of the trunks. Having a long, elephantine trunk was thought of as unlikely by multiple authors, including Harris and the 2001 study. Besides the large opening often associated with a trunk, the general skull structure makes it unlikely for the trunk to be elongated. The upper tusks, retained in all more derived proboscideans, were likely lost so that the upper lip could directly manipulate the food of Prodeinotherium.

== Paleobiology ==
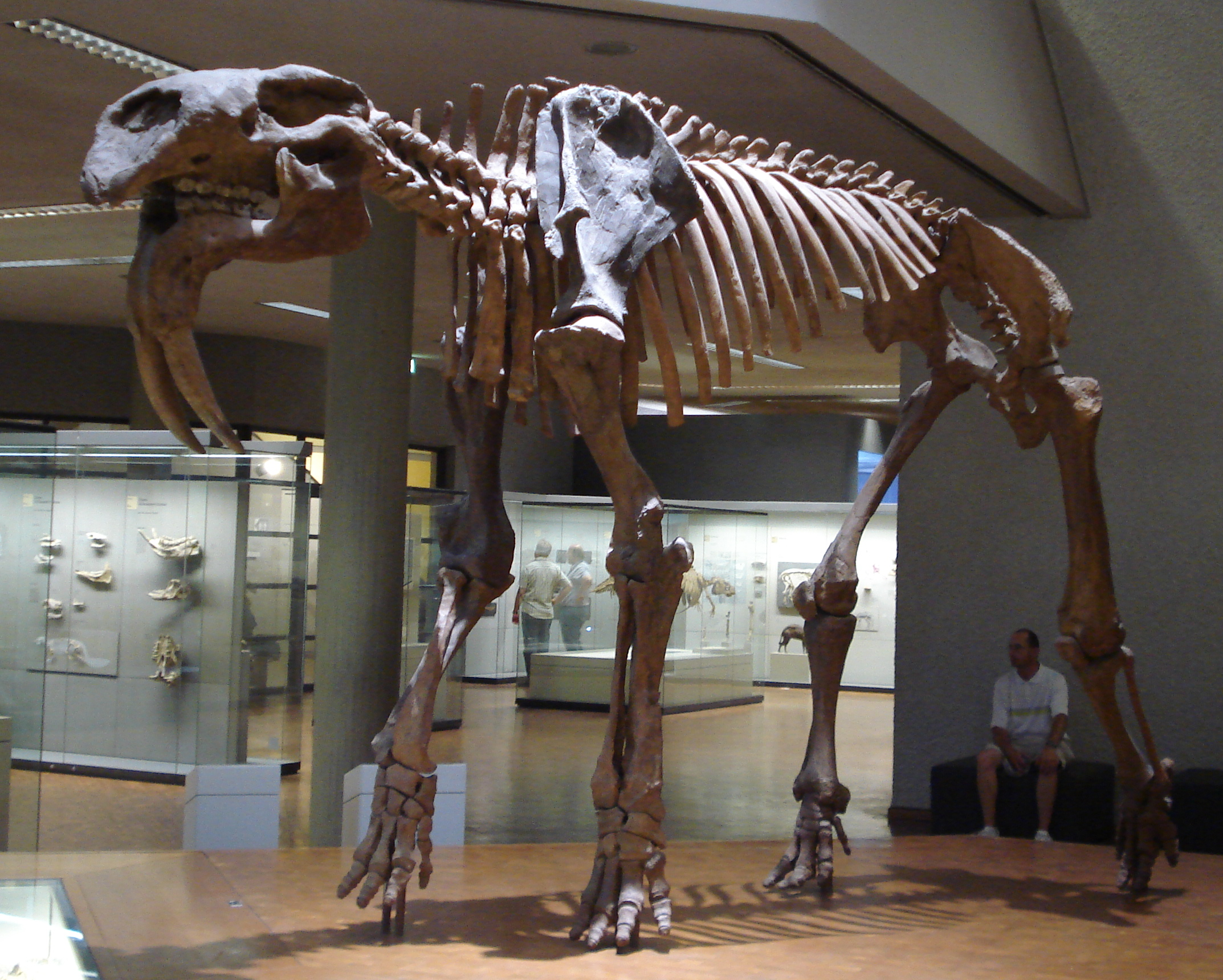
Restored skeleton of P. bavaricum

Deinotheres were generally browsers, meaning they ate plants above ground level; the dental morphology of Prodeinotherium molars made them well suited for minimally abrasive browsing diets. Deinotheres possibly ate specific dicots. These could be found in closed woodland and forest environments. Dental mesowear, a proxy for the long term diet of an individual animal, of Prodeinotherium individuals from the site of Artesilla during the onset of the Middle Miocene Climatic Optimum show mesowear scores consistent with browsing. Dental microwear, which measures diet in the last days and weeks of an animal's life, suggests a more mixed feeding signal for Prodeinotherium, which could indicate some seasonal variability in their diets. The way they chewed their food was probably similar to that of modern tapirs, with the front teeth being used to crush the food, while the second and third molars have a strong vertical shearing action, with little lateral movement. This chewing action differs from both that of gomphotheres (lateral grinding) and elephants (horizontal shearing). The downturned lower tusks were used for stripping bark or other vegetation. The supports for the tusks used in feeding is also based on the fact that juveniles have a different tusk morphology, which is consistent on them likely possessing a slightly different diet or feeding strategy. The trunks of deinotheres were likely similar to a tapirs, which could have been used for grasping plant matter and moving it to where the tongue could manipulate it.

Prodeinotherium was a herbivorous organism. Based on the known distribution of fossils, Prodeinotherium could only survive along the coast in closed forests. Rodents and fish may have lived in the same environment or region as Prodeinotherium. In Europe, fossils of Gomphotherium have been found alongside those of Prodeinotherium, showing that the genera likely ate different plants. Dental wear analysis of P. bavaricum and G. angustidens from the Middle Miocene site of Gračanica in Bosnia and Herzegovina confirms that while both taxa were strict browsers, the latter's diet consisted of more abrasive plants.
