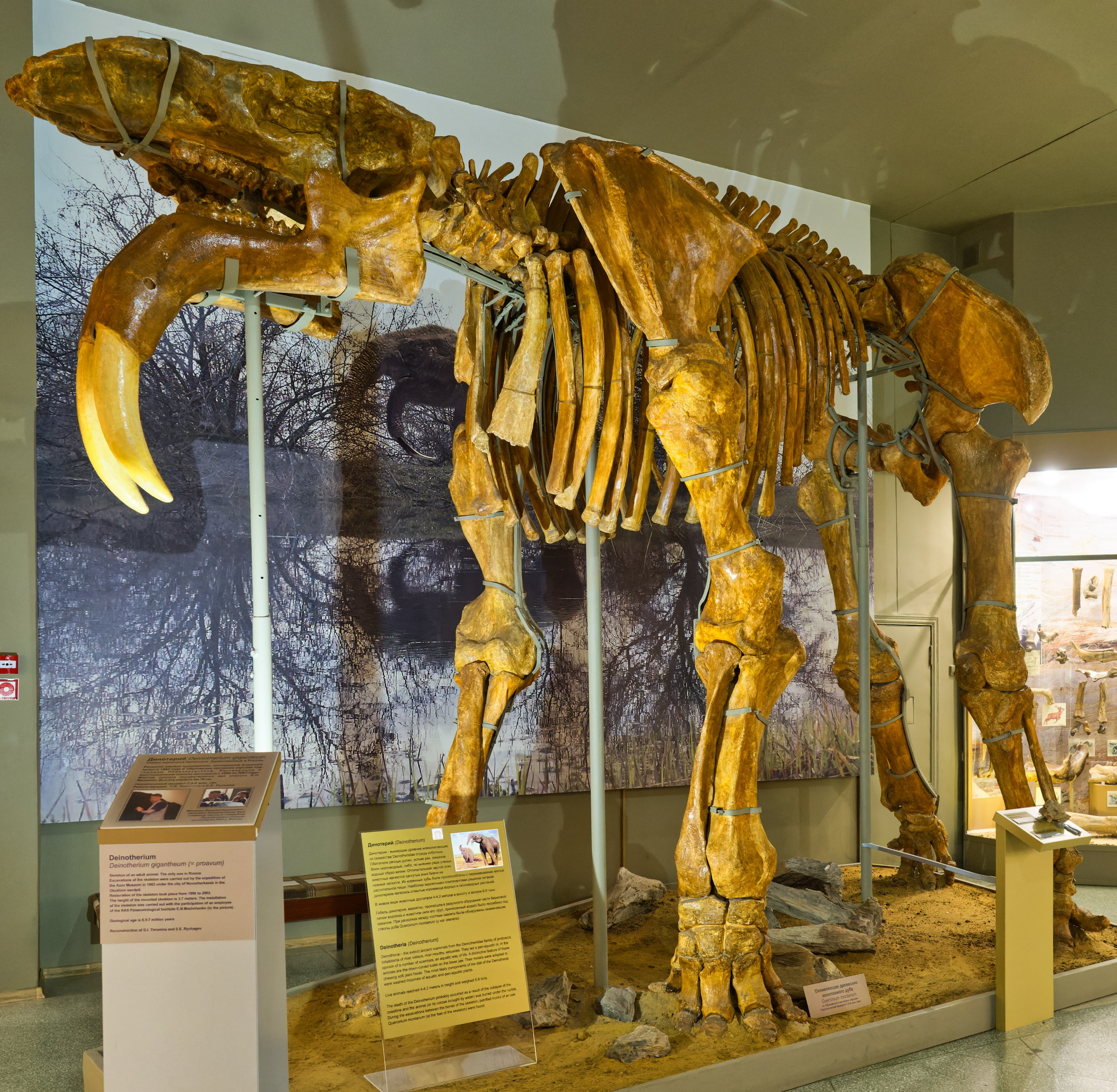
- Deinotherium
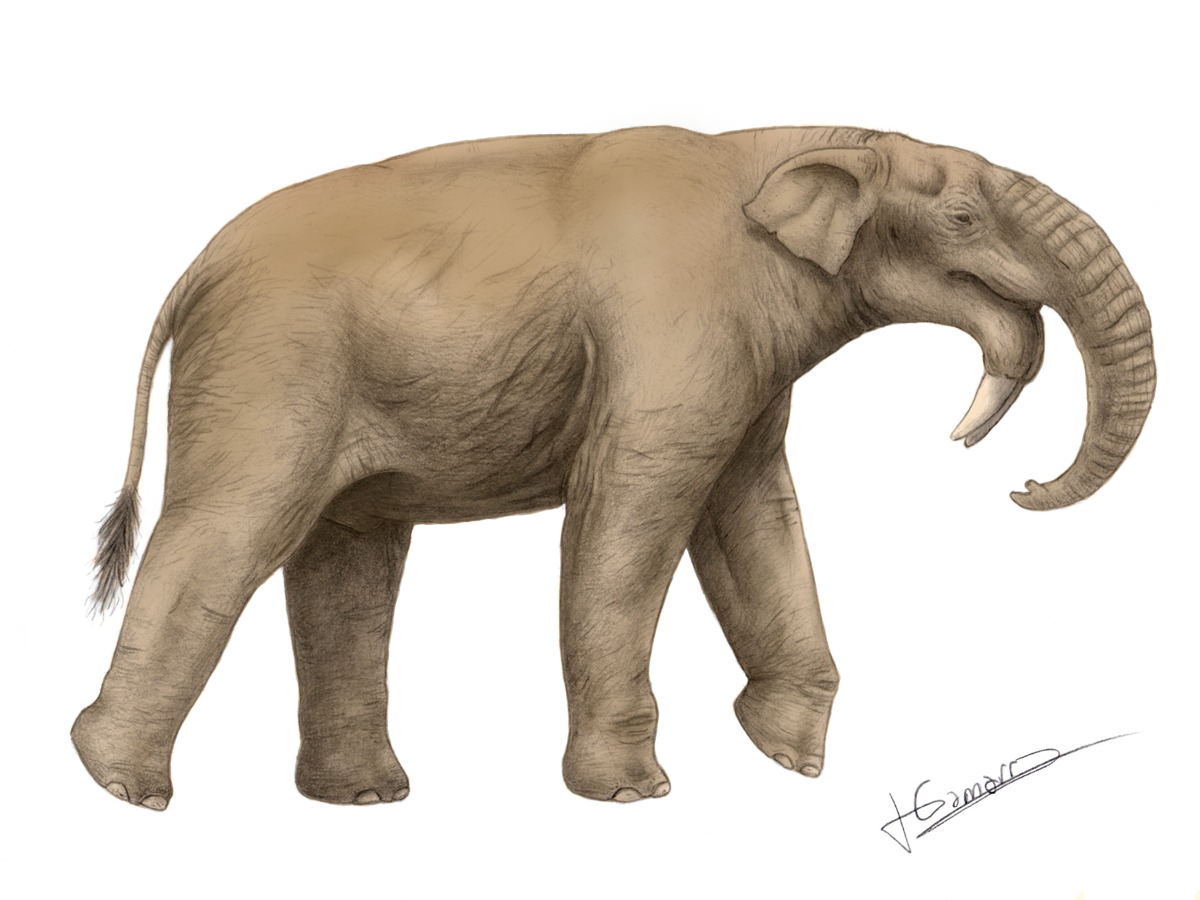
- Life restoration of Deinotherium bozasi

Scientific classification
- Kingdom: Animalia
- Phylum: Chordata
- Class: Mammalia
- Infraclass: Placentalia
- Order: Proboscidea
- Suborder: †Plesielephantiformes
- Family: †Deinotheriidae; Bonaparte, 1845

Type genus
- †Deinotherium Kaup, 1829

Genera
- †Chilgatheriinae; †Chilgatherium; †Deinotheriinae; †Deinotherium; †Prodeinotherium

= Deinotheriidae =

Deinotheriidae Temporal range: Late Oligocene-Early Pleistocene 28–1 Ma

Prehistoric family of mammals

Deinotheriidae is a family of prehistoric elephant-like proboscideans that lived during the Cenozoic era. They first appeared in Africa during the Oligocene then spread across Europe and the lower latitudes of Asia during the Miocene epoch. Their most distinctive features were their lack of upper tusks and downward-curving tusks on the lower jaw.

Deinotheres were not very diverse; the only three known genera are Chilgatherium, Prodeinotherium, and Deinotherium. These form an evolutionary succession, with each new genus replacing the preceding one. Deinotheres were relatively conservative and showed little morphological change over their evolution, aside from a progressive increase in body size. Some species of Deinotherium are among the largest known land mammals ever, considerably exceeding modern elephants in size. The last members of Deinotherium persisted until the end of the Early Pleistocene in Africa, around 1 million years ago.

They are named for Deinotherium, from the Ancient Greek δεινός (deinós), meaning "terrible", and θηρίον (thērión), meaning "beast".

== Description ==
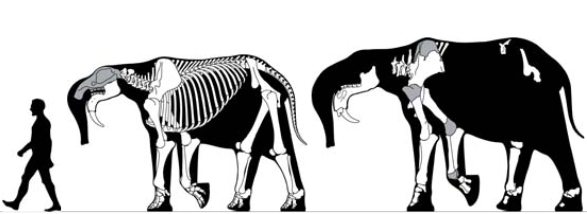
Skeletons of Prodeinotherium bavaricum compared to a human

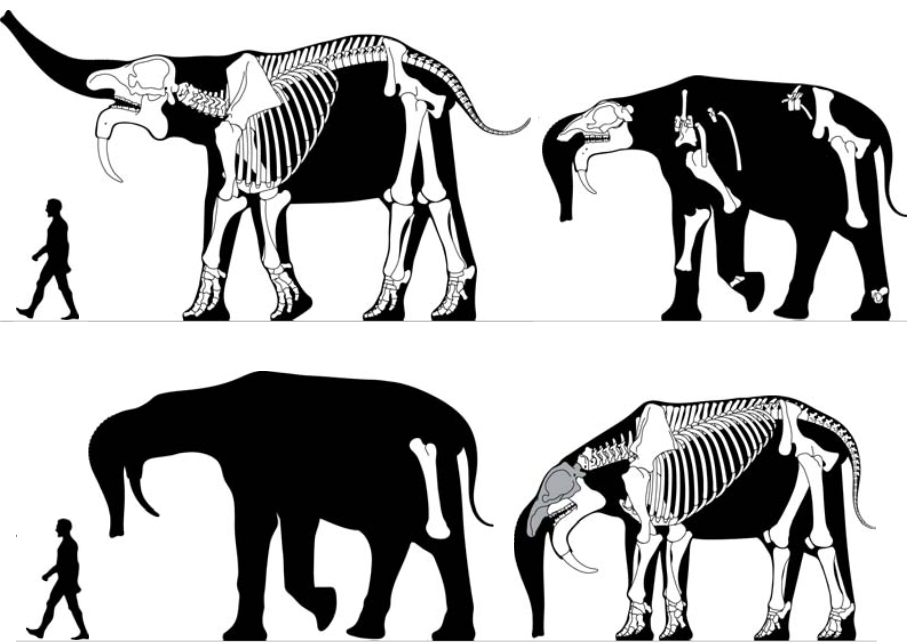
Skeletons of various specimens/species of Deinotherium compared to a human

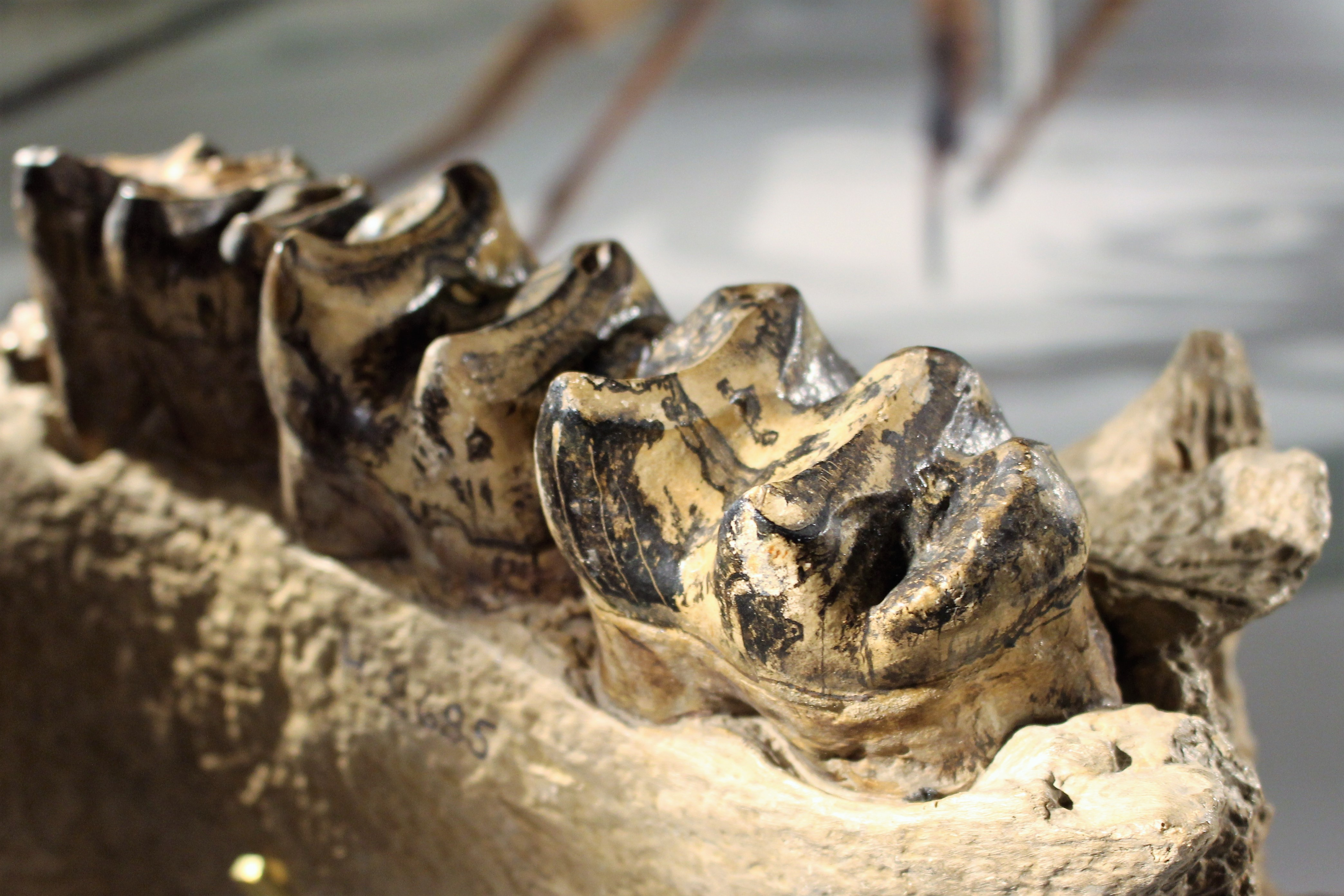
Cheek teeth of Deinotherium

The body shape and proportions of deinotheres were very much like those of modern elephants. The legs were long, like modern elephants, but the skull was rather flatter than that of true elephants. The upper jaw lacked incisor and canine teeth, but possessed five low-crowned molars on each side, with the same number in the lower jaw. Deinotheres used their front teeth for crushing their food, and the back teeth for shearing (slicing) the plant material. The front part of the lower jaw was turned downwards and bore the two tusk-like incisors. These curved downwards and backwards in a sort of huge hook and constituted the most distinct feature of the deinotheres. The tusks were used to strip vegetation rather than for digging.

While the earliest deinothere Chilgatherium probably weighed only around 1.5 tonnes (3,300 lb) and was less than 2 metres (6.6 ft) tall, some species of Deinotherium represent among the largest known proboscideans, with shoulder heights of over 4 metres (13 ft) and body masses around 12 tonnes (26,000 lb), considerably exceeding living African bush elephants in body size, making them among the largest land mammals ever.

== Ecology ==
Deinotheres were "shearing browsers" adapted for feeding on plants above ground level. The way they chewed their food was probably similar to that of modern tapirs, with the front teeth being used to crush the food, while the second and third molars have a strong vertical shearing action, with little lateral (side-to-side) movement. This chewing action differs from both that of gomphotheres (lateral grinding) and elephants (horizontal shearing). Deinothere molars show little wear, indicating a diet of soft, non-gritty, forest vegetation, with the down-turned lower tusks being used for stripping bark or other vegetation.

Deinotherium giganteum has a more elongated lower fore limb than early and middle Miocene Prodeinotherium, indicating a more efficient stride as an adaptation to the spread of savannas in Europe during the late Miocene. Deinotheres probably migrated from forest to forest, traversing the wide and (to them) useless grasslands.

== Evolutionary history ==
Deinotheriids are thought to have diverged away from the ancestors of Elephantiformes during the Eocene, over 40 million years ago, based on the presence of primitive Elephantiformes in Lutetian deposits. Phylogeny of Proboscidea showing placement of Deinotheriidae, following Hautier et al. 2021:

- Proboscidea
  - Eritherium
  - - Phosphatherium
    - - Daouitherium
      - - Numidotherium
        - - Barytherium
          - - Arcanotherium
            - - Omanitherium
              - - Saloumia
                - Moeritherium
                - - Deinotheriidae
                  - Elephantiformes
                    - Dagbatitherium
                    - - Palaeomastodon
                      - - Phiomia
                        - Elephantimorpha

The oldest known deinothere is Chilgatherium harrisi from the late Oligocene, around 27-28 million years ago. Its fossil remains have been found in the district of Chilga in Ethiopia (hence the name). It is primarily known from tooth remains.

By the early Miocene, deinotheres had grown to the size of a small elephant and had migrated to Eurasia. Several species are known, all belonging to the genus Prodeinotherium.

During the late middle Miocene, these modest-seized proboscideans were replaced by much larger forms across Eurasia. In Europe, Prodeinotherium bavaricum appeared in the early Miocene mammal faunal zone MN 4, but was soon replaced by Deinotherium giganteum in the middle Miocene. Likewise in Asia, Prodeinotherium is known from the early Miocene strata in the Bugti Hills, and continued into the middle Miocene Chinji Formation, where it was replaced by D. indicum.

While these Miocene deinotheres were dispersed widely and evolved to huge elephant sizes, they were not as common as the contemporary (but smaller) Elephantoidea. Fossil remains of this age are known from the France, Germany, Greece, Malta, and northern India and Pakistan. These consist chiefly of teeth and the bones of the skull.

After the extinction of the paraceratheres at the Oligocene-Miocene transition, the deinotheres were (and remained) the largest animals walking the Earth.

The late Miocene was the heyday of the giant deinotheres. D. giganteum was common from Vallesian and Turolian localities in Europe. Prodeinotherium, which was reasonably well represented in the early Miocene of Africa, was succeeded by D. bozasi at the beginning of the late Miocene. And in Asia, D. indicum was most common in the late-Miocene Dhok Pathan Formation.

Fossil teeth of D. giganteum, from the late-Miocene Sinap Formation at the Turkish site of Kayadibi are larger than those from older localities, such as Eppelsheim, Wissberg, and Montredon, indicating a tendency for increasing size of members of the species over time. These were the biggest animals of their day, protected from both predators and rival herbivores by virtue of their huge bulk. The largest mammoths did not approach them in size until the Pleistocene.

With the end of the Miocene, deinothere fortunes declined. D. indicum died out about 7 million years ago, possibly driven to extinction by the same process of climate change that had previously eliminated the even more enormous Paraceratherium. While in Europe, D. giganteum continued, albeit with dwindling numbers, until the middle Pliocene; the most recent specimen is from Romania.

In its original African homeland, Deinotherium continued to flourish throughout the Pliocene, and fossils have been uncovered at several of the African sites where remains of hominids have also been found.

The last deinothere species to become extinct was D. bozasi. The youngest known specimens are from the Kanjera Formation, Kenya, about 1 million years ago (early Pleistocene). The causes of the extinction of such a successful and long-lived animal are not known, although a small number of other species of African megafauna also died out at this time.
