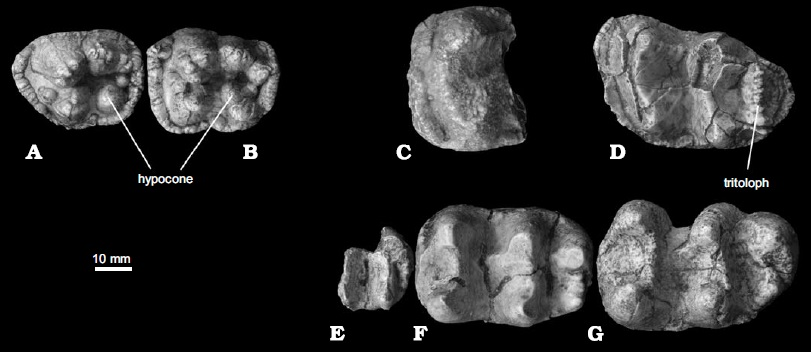
- Dental elements of Chilgatherium

Scientific classification
- Kingdom: Animalia
- Phylum: Chordata
- Class: Mammalia
- Infraclass: Placentalia
- Order: Proboscidea
- Family: †Deinotheriidae
- Subfamily: †Chilgatheriinae; Sanders, Kappelman, & Rasmussen, 2004
- Genus: †Chilgatherium; Sanders, Kappelman, & Rasmussen, 2004
- Species: †C. harrisi

Binomial name
- †Chilgatherium harrisi Sanders, Kappelman, & Rasmussen, 2004

= Chilgatherium =

Chilgatherium Temporal range: Late Oligocene

Extinct genus of mammals

Chilgatherium ('Chilga beast' after the locality in which it was found) is the earliest and most primitive representative of the family Deinotheriidae. It is known from late Oligocene (27- to 28-million-year-old) fossil teeth found in the Ethiopian district of Chilga.

So far, only a few molar teeth have been found, but these are distinct enough that this animal can be identified with confidence. The teeth differ from those of Prodeinotherium, Deinotherium, and the various barytheres in various details, enough to show that this is a distinct type of animal, and has been placed in its own subfamily. Compared to later deinotheres, Chilgatherium was quite small, about 2 m (6.6 ft) tall at the shoulder and weighed about 1.5 t (1.7 short tons). It is not known if it shared the distinctive downward-curving tusks on the lower jaw that the later deinotheres had.

Chilgatherium disappeared prior to the Early Miocene, when it was replaced by Prodeinotherium.
