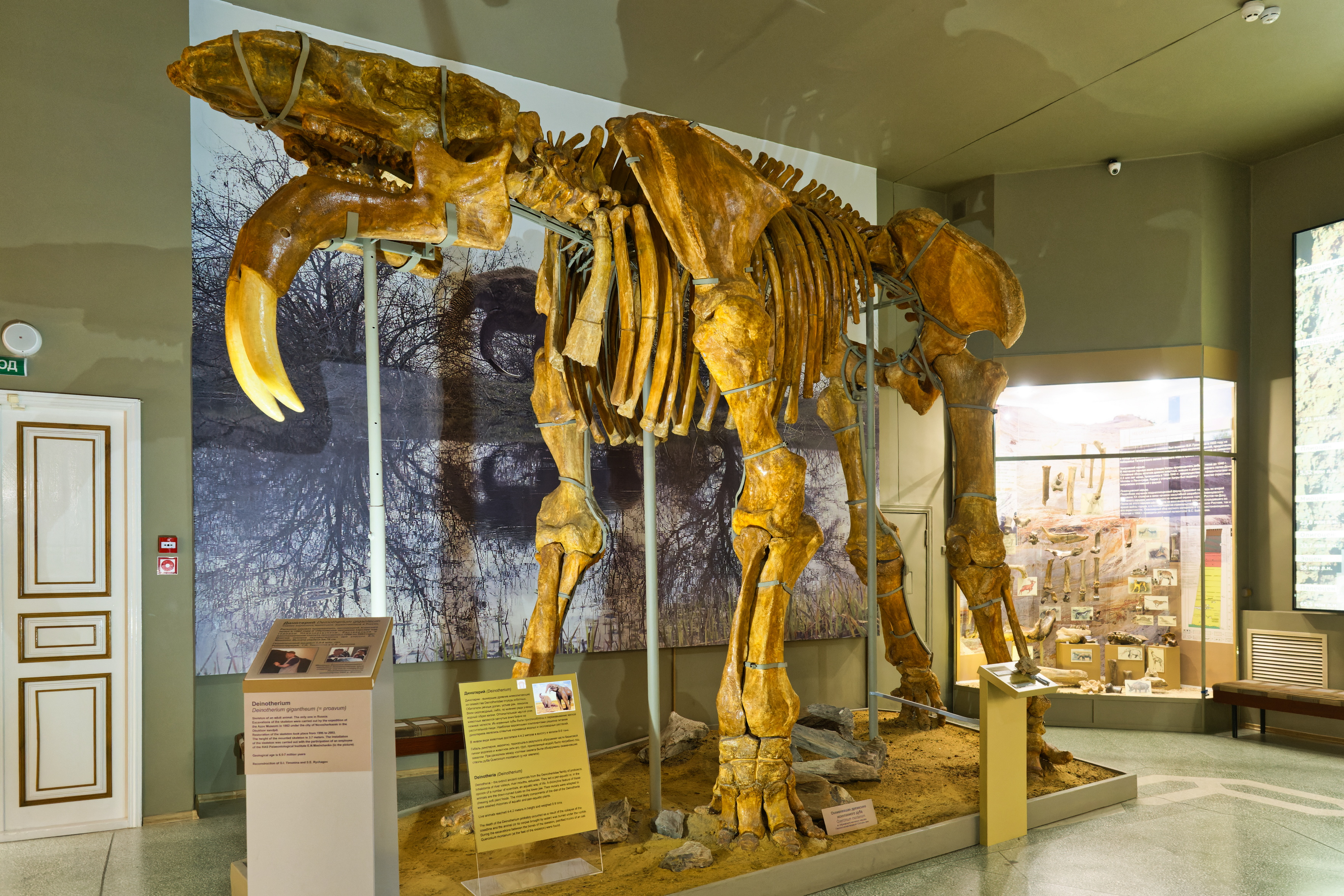
- D. giganteum skeleton cast from the Azov Museum of History, Archaeology and Paleontology

Scientific classification
- Kingdom: Animalia
- Phylum: Chordata
- Class: Mammalia
- Order: Proboscidea
- Family: †Deinotheriidae
- Subfamily: †Deinotheriinae
- Genus: †Deinotherium; Kaup, 1829

Type species
- †Deinotherium giganteum Kaup, 1829

Species
- D. bozasi (Arambourg, 1934); D. giganteum (Kaup, 1829); D. indicum (Falconer, 1845); D.? levius (Jourdan, 1861); D.? proavum (Eichwald, 1831)

= Deinotherium =

Deinotherium Temporal range: Middle Miocene to Early Pleistocene, 13–1 Ma

Extinct genus of mammals

Deinotherium is an extinct genus of large, elephant-like proboscideans that lived from the Middle Miocene until the end of the Early Pleistocene. Although its appearance is reminiscent of modern elephants, Deinotherium differered considerably from modern elephants in several anatomical details: it possessed a notably more flexible neck, proportionally more slender limbs, tapir-like teeth, as well as tusks which grew down and curved back from the lower jaw (mandible), and lacked tusks growing from the upper jaw. Several species of Deinotherium grew larger than modern elephants, not uncommonly reaching shoulder heights of 4 metres (13 ft) and body masses of 12 tonnes (26,000 lb), making them among the largest land mammals ever. Deinotherium was a widespread genus: during the Miocene they ranged across East Africa, and Eurasia from Western Europe to the Indian subcontinent. They were browsing animals, with a diet largely consisting of leaves. The genus most likely went extinct due to environmental changes, such as forested areas gradually being replaced by open grasslands, during the latter half of the Neogene. Deinotherium thrived the longest in Africa, where they survived until the end of the Early Pleistocene, around 1 million years ago.

== History and naming ==
In 1613, a gravestone engraved with the name "Theutobochus Rex" was reputedly excavated from a sand pit in the vicinity of Langon, near Montrigaud in southeast France, also reputedly alongside enormous bones, and silver coins depicting the Roman Republic leader Gaius Marius, who had defeated the Germanic king Teutobod (who by the 17th century was often mythologised as a giant) and his army in southern France around 100 BC. A French surgeon named Mazurier exhibited these relics across France, and for some time they were located in apartments owned by Queen of France Marie de' Medici. However, the veracity of the story was quickly questioned and subject to much controversy, with a long-running dispute via an exchange of pamphlets between the University of Paris surgeon Nicholas Habicot, who argued for a giant identity, and botany student and anatomist Jean Riolan who argued based on comparative anatomy that the bones represented some kind of large animal (in Riolan's opinion likely an elephant), and that the supposed discovery was either mistaken or a fraud.

21 years later in 1634, French polymath Nicolas-Claude Fabri de Peiresc asked the physician Nivolet to investigate the site and the relics (except the tombstone, which was now missing). Following the details of a report that Nivolet sent to him Peiresc concluded that the story was a hoax (based on the fact that the coins were actually from Massalia and did not depict Marius, and that it was unlikely a Germanic leader would have a gravestone written in Latin which he and his people did not speak) and later after another discovery of another supposed giant within the vicinity of Montrigaud, like Riolan concluded the remains represented those of an elephant. The bones were eventually handed over to the French National Museum of Natural History, and were centuries later recognised as belonging to Deinotherium.

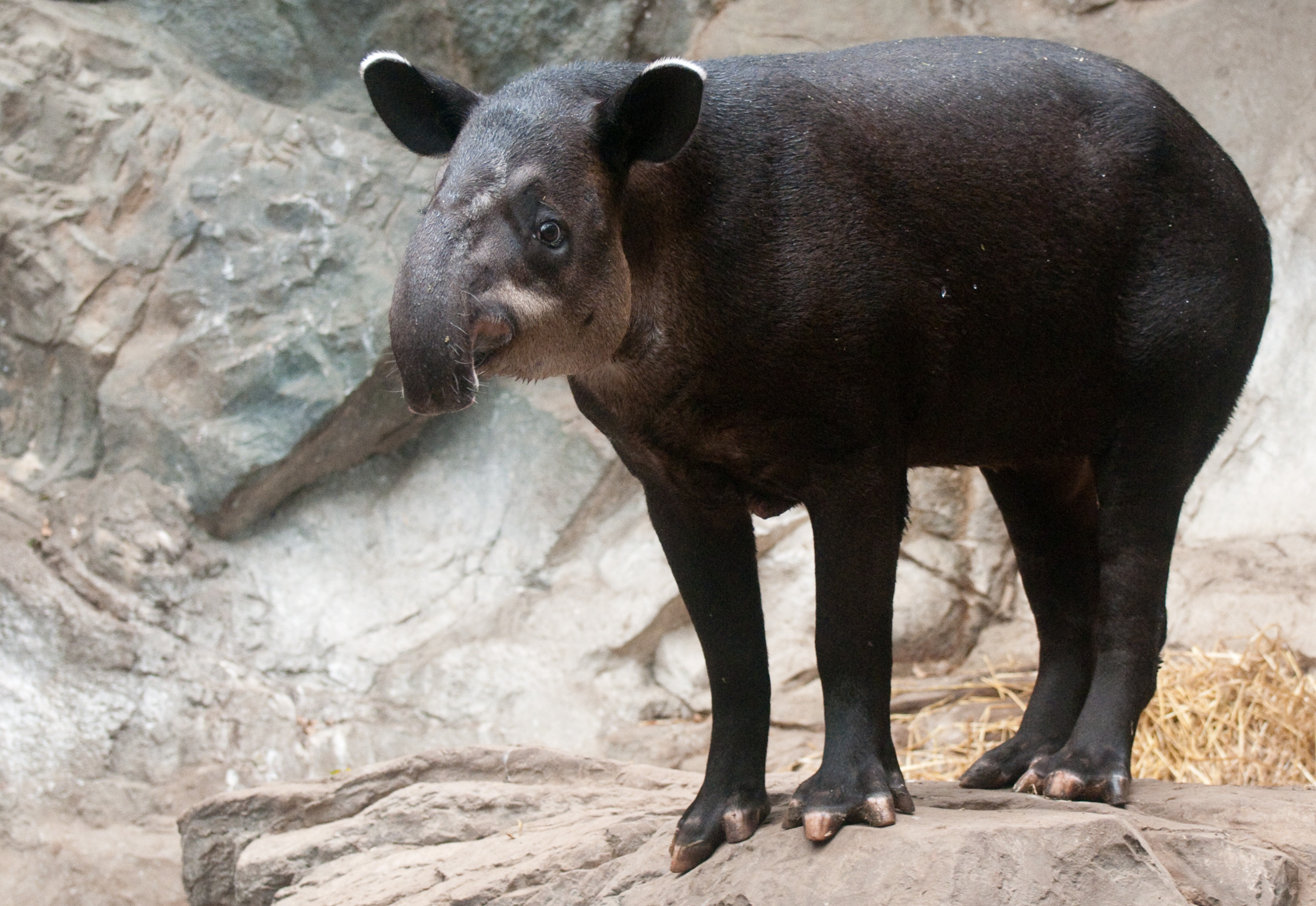
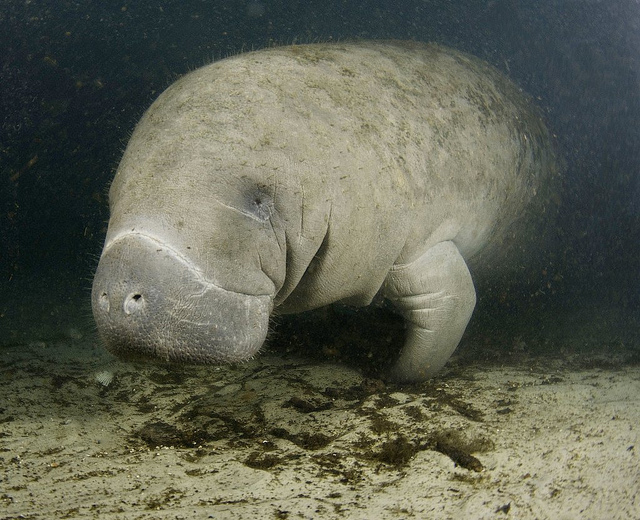
Early scientists suggested Deinotherium material might have belonged to either an extinct species of tapir (left) or sirenian (right)

In 1715, French scholar René de Réaumur investigated turquoise mines in southern France, and realised that the ores used were not rocks like those from turquoise mines from the Middle East, but were blue-green stained fossilised teeth. In his memoir he included a plate with an image of one of these teeth, which was later recognised as being the earliest depiction of a Deinotherium tooth. Other confirmed and probable Deinotherium remains including lower jaws, teeth and ivory fragments, were reported from across France from the 1750s to the 1780s, including a lower jaw with teeth broken into two halves found near Beinc in Haute-Garonne, southwest France in 1783. In 1822, based on the similarity of the teeth to those of tapirs, Georges Cuvier, widely regarded as the father of vertebrate paleontology, gave the name "Tapirs gigantesques" to the remains, primarily based on the Bienc jaw, concluding that they belong to giant elephant-sized tapir relatives. The genus Deinotherium and the species D. giganteum was coined in 1829 by German paleontologist Johann Jakob von Kaup based on a complete but broken mandible (lower jaw) discovered in sands near Eppelsheim, southwest Germany. Kaup originally incorrectly reconstructed the jaw's tusks as being upward facing, but corrected this several years later. A second species D. bavaricum was named in 1831 by German paleontologist Christian Erich Hermann von Meyer based on remains found in Bavaria, which von Meyer regarded as comparable to rhinoceroses, but is now recognised to belong to the separate deinotheriid genus Prodeinotherium. In 1834 French paleontologist Édouard Lartet studied additional remains of Deinotherium that had been recovered in France. In 1836, Kaup's friend August von Klipstein found a skull of Deinotherium also within the Eppelsheim area, which was later in 1837 exhibited in France.

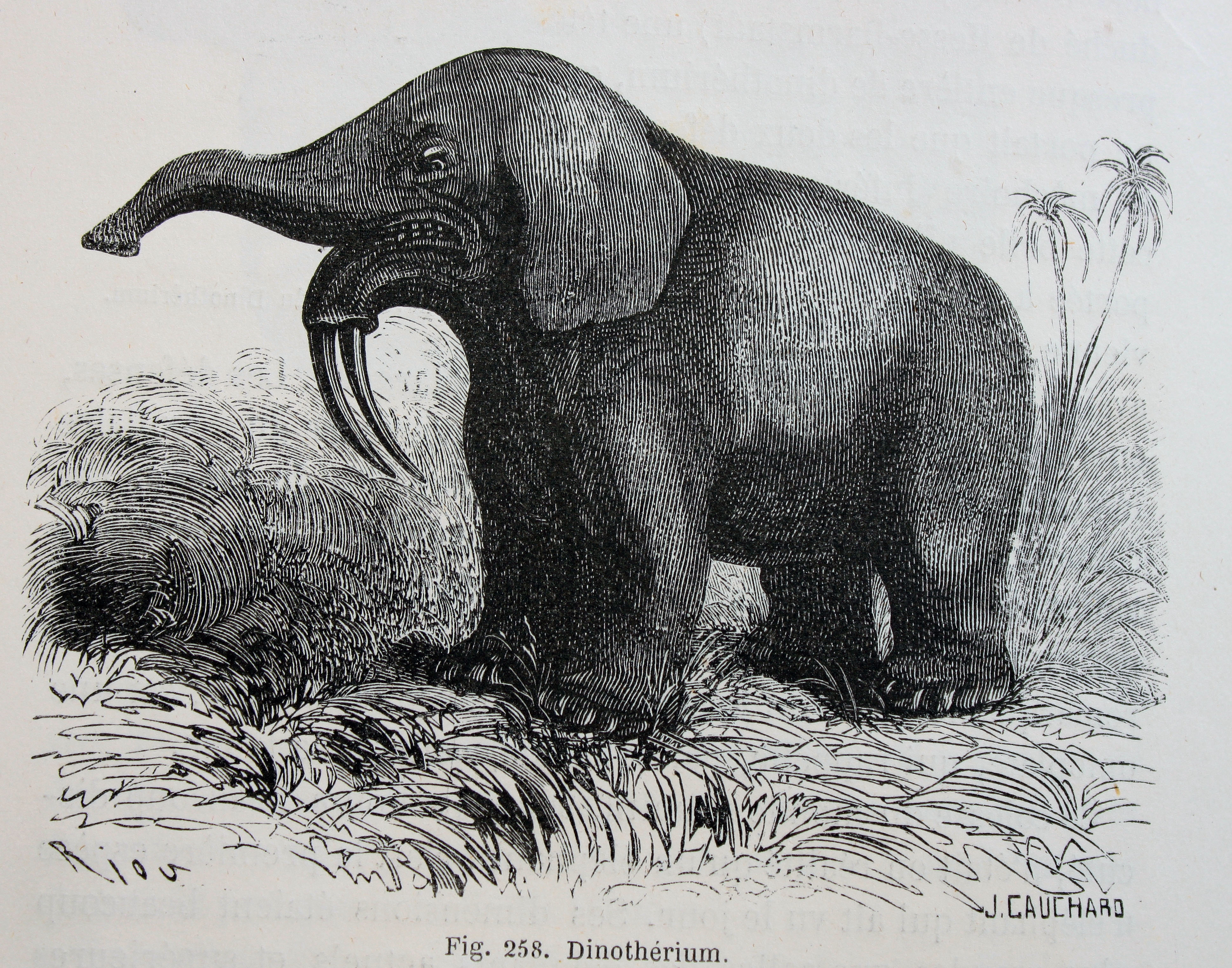
An illustration of Deinotherium from the 1863 French book The World Before the Deluge

The fragmentary and unusual nature of known Deithotherium remains sparked much speculation as to its appearance and relationships with other animals. French anatomist Henri Marie Ducrotay de Blainville in an 1837 paper regarded Deinotherium as being closely related to sirenians (manatees and dugongs), though this view was contested by other scholars. While Kaup originally assumed that Deinotherium had large, armadillo or anteater-like claws based on erroneously interpreting a large ungual claw (later recognised as belonging to a chalicothere) found near the Epplesheim jaw as belonging to Deinotherium, by 1837 he came to regard Deinotherium as a "pachyderm" (an obsolete zoological term to describe large terrestrial mammals with thick skin, such as elephants, hippos and rhinoceroses). French zoologist Hercule Eugène Straus-Dürckheim in an 1837 publication assumed that the head was too heavy to have belonged to a terrestrial animal and argued that Deinotherium was a marine mammal intermediate between cetaceans (whales, dolphins, etc) and pachyderms. An aquatic ecology was also supported by British paleontologist William Buckland in an 1838 publication, who also suggested that it used its tusks to cling to river banks and was a burrowing animal.

Later finds of Deinotherium remains at various localities in France in the 1840s and 1850s clarified its anatomy, which by 1859 had led it to be widely accepted for Deinotherium to be placed within the Proboscidea (the broader group which contains elephants and their extinct relatives), and finds in India (from the island of Perim in what is now Gujarat) described as D. indicum extended the range of the genus outside of Europe. Fossils of an exceptionally large specimen found in Manzati, Romania between the late 19th and early 20th century were described as D. gigantissimum. In Bulgaria Deinotherium remains have been found from 1897 onward, with one particular fossil of an almost complete animal found in 1965. These remains were officially described in December 2006 as D. thraceiensis, making it the most recently named species, although later studies synonymize it with the other European species.

The name Deinotherium is derived from Ancient Greek δεινός, (deinós), meaning "terrible", and θηρίον (therión), meaning "beast". Some authors have on occasion referred to Deinotherium as Dinotherium, following latinization of the first element of the name. Although pronunciation remains unchanged, Deinotherium remains the valid spelling as it was coined first.

== Description ==
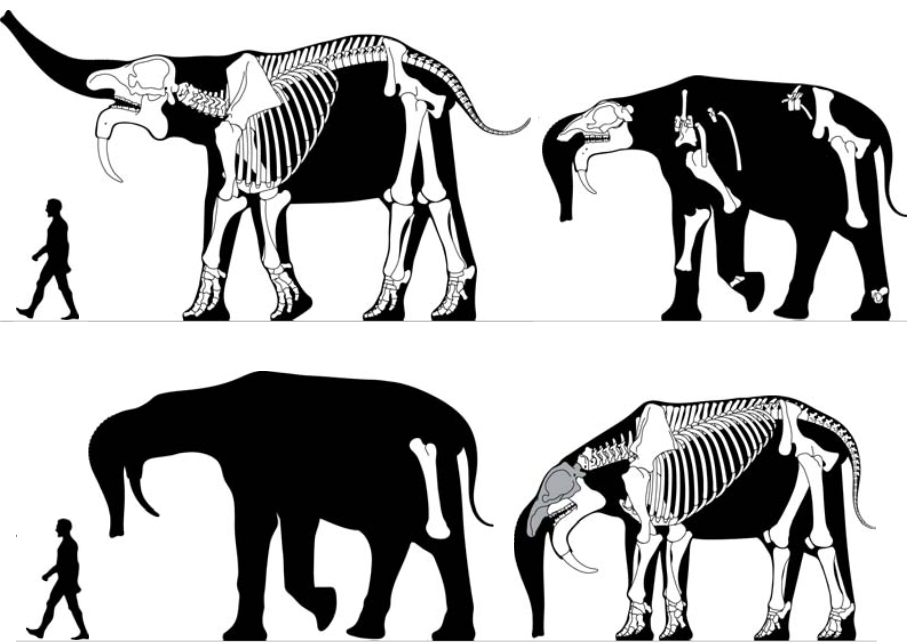
Skeletons of D. "thraceiensis" (top left) two D. giganteum specimens (top right and bottom left), and D. proavum (bottom right) compared to a 1.8 metres (5 ft 11 in) tall human

Deinotherium is mainly distinguished from its ancestor Prodeinotherium by its considerably larger size. Deinotherium was a large-bodied proboscidean, with some species considerably exceeding modern elephants in size. Two adult males of D. giganteum were around 3.63–4.0 m (11.9–13.1 ft) tall at the shoulder and weighed 8.8–12 tonnes (8.7–11.8 long tons; 9.7–13.2 short tons). This is similar to adult males of D. proavum, one of which weighed 10.3 tonnes (10.1 long tons; 11.4 short tons) and was 3.59 m (11.8 ft) tall at the shoulder. The average male and female D. proavum has been estimated to have had a shoulder height of 3.65 m (12.0 ft) and a weight of 10.5 tonnes (11.6 short tons). However, both these species are smaller than a 45-year-old male of D. "thraceiensis", at 4.01 m (13.2 ft) tall at the shoulder and 13.2 tonnes (13.0 long tons; 14.6 short tons). The most recent species, D. bozasi, was around 3.6 m (12 ft) tall at the shoulder and weighed 9 metric tons (9.9 short tons). The general anatomy of Deinotherium is similar to that of modern elephants with pillar-like limbs, although proportionally longer and more slender than those of other proboscideans. The bones of the toes are longer and less robust than in elephants and the neck likewise differs notably in that it is relatively longer, though still quite short compared to other modern browsers like giraffes.

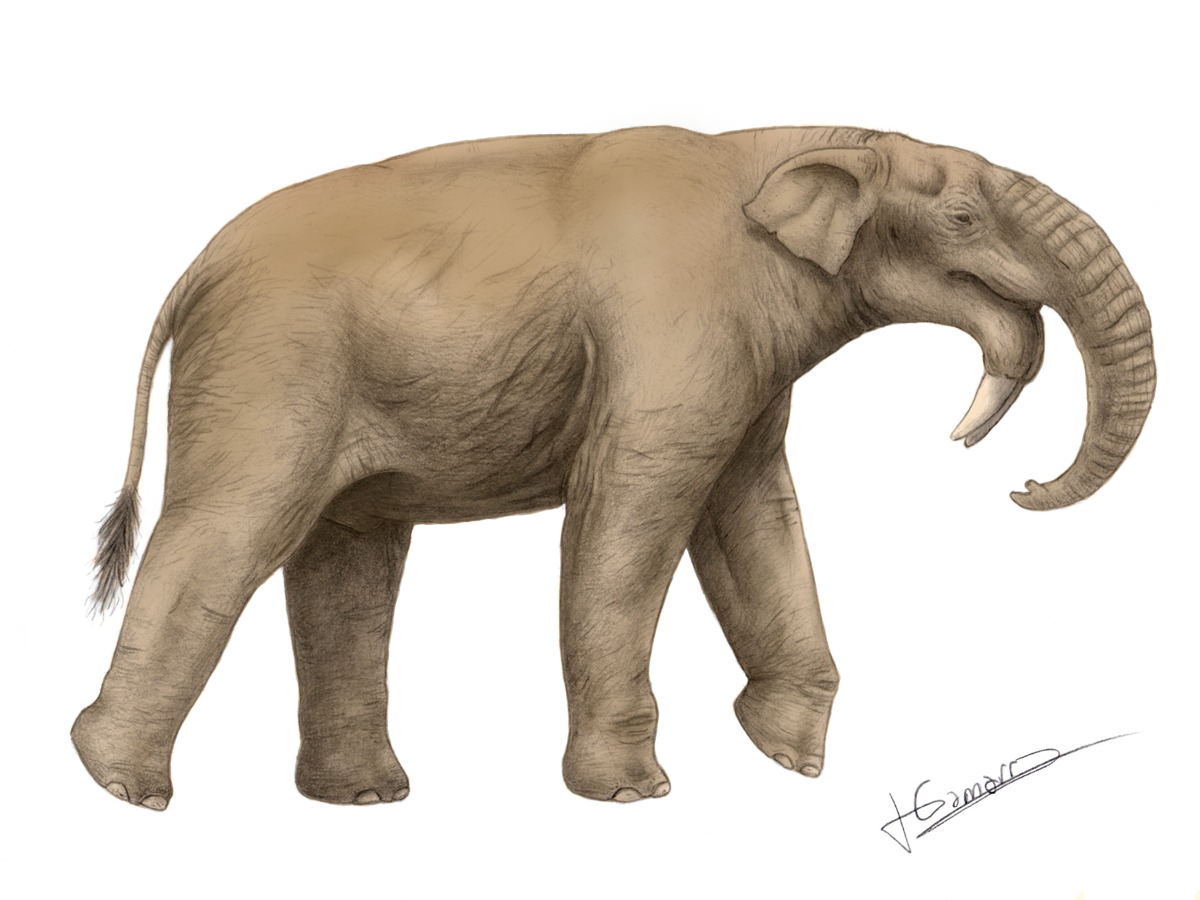
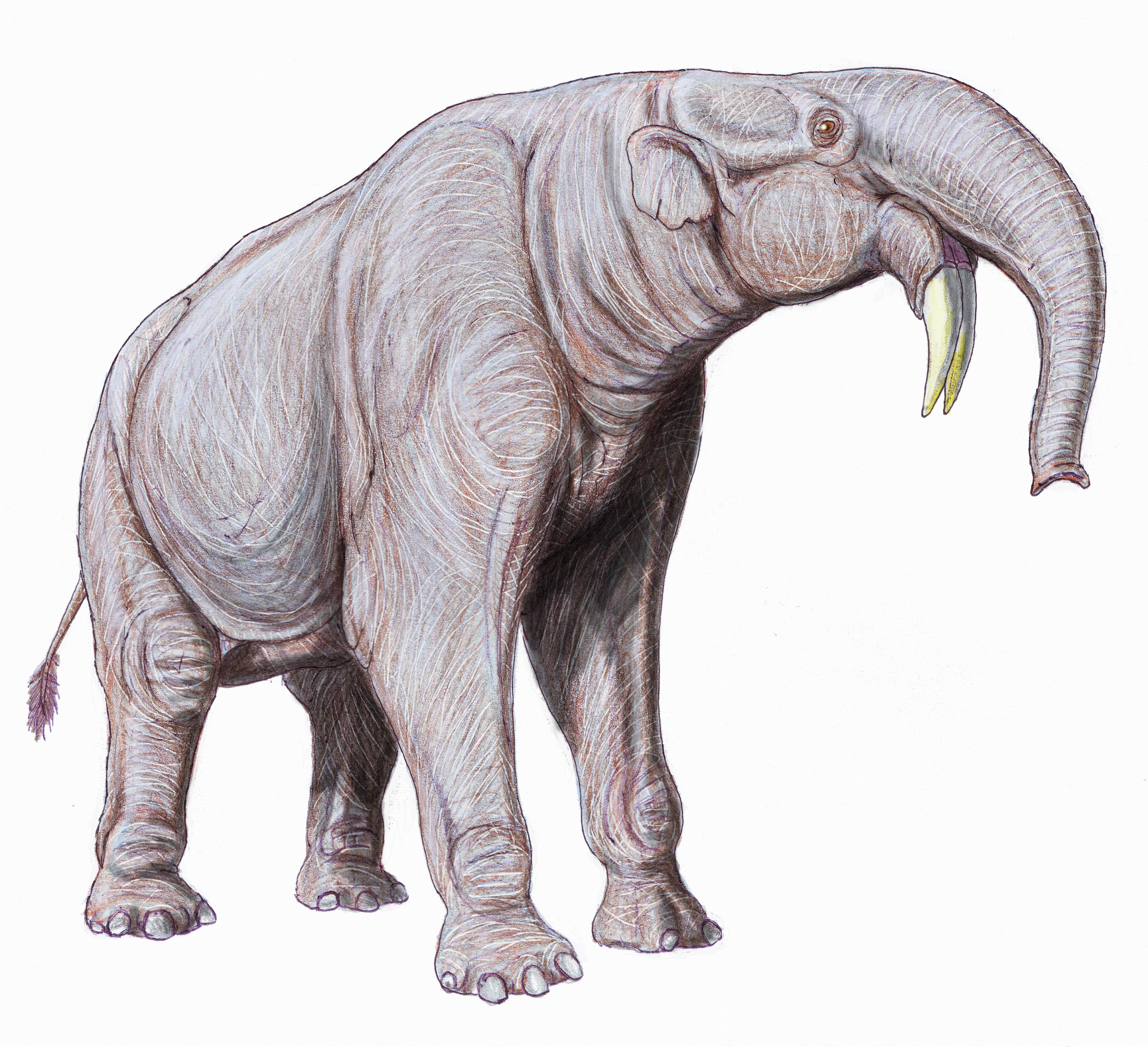
The restoration of two separate species of Deinotherium based on their comparison of size and shape similar to modern elephant relatives: D. bozasi (left) and D. giganteum (right).

The permanent tooth formula of D. giganteum was $\frac{0.0.2.3.}{1.0.2.3.}$ (Note: No incisors, no canines, 2 premolars and 3 molars in each half of the upper jaw, and 1 incisor, no canines, 2 premolars and 3 molars in each half of the lower jaw) (deciduous $\frac{0.0.3.}{1.0.3.}$), with vertical cheek tooth replacement as is typical for mammals, as opposed to the horizontal tooth cheek tooth replacement exhibited by elephantimorph proboscideans. Two sets of bilophodont (two-ridged) and trilophodont (three-ridged) teeth were present. The molars and rear premolars were vertical shearing teeth, and suggest that deinotheres became an independent evolutionary branch very early on; the other premolars were used for crushing. The cranium was short, low, and flattened on the top, in contrast to more advanced proboscideans, which have a higher and more domed forehead, with very large, elevated occipital condyles. The largest skulls of Deinotherium reached a length of 120–130 cm (47–51 in). The nasal opening was retracted and large, indicating a large trunk. The rostrum was long and the rostral fossa broad. The mandibular symphysis (the fused frontmost-part of the lower jaw) were very long and curved downward, which along with the backward-curved tusks, are a distinguishing feature of the group.

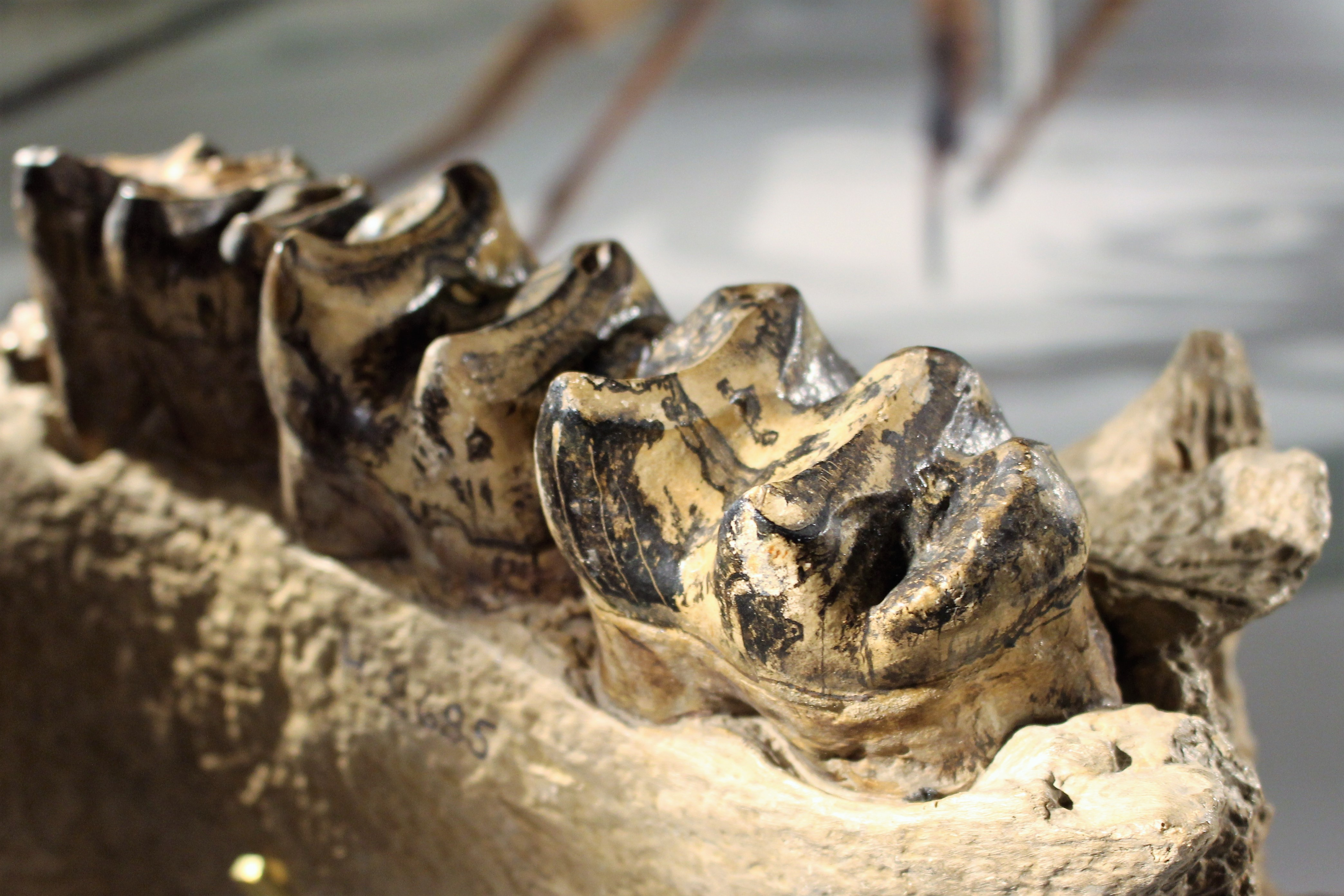
Teeth of Deinotherium

These tusks are without doubt the most immediately noticeable feature of Deinotherium. Unlike in modern proboscideans, which possess tusks that grow from the upper incisors, the tusks of Deinotherium grow from the lower incisors, with upper incisors and upper and lower canines missing entirely. The curvature is initially formed by the mandible itself, with the teeth themselves erupting at only the halfway point of the curve. The degree to which the tusks follow the direction predetermined by the mandible varies between specimens, with some tusks following the curve and pointing backwards, forming an almost semicircular shape, while in other specimens the tusks continue down almost vertically. The tusks have a roughly oval cross-section and could reach a length of 1.4 m (4 ft 7 in).

Although the presence of an elephant-like proboscis or trunk in Deinotherium is evident thanks to the size and shape of the external nares, the exact shape and size of this trunk is a matter that has long been debated. Historic depictions commonly portray it as very elephantine with a long trunk and tusks breaking through the skin below an elephantine lower lip. In the early 2000s Markov and colleagues published papers on the facial soft tissue of Deinotherium contesting these ideas, instead suggesting an alternative soft tissue reconstruction. In the first of these publications the authors argue that, due to the origin of these animal's tusks, the lower lip should be situated beneath them as they evolved their classic downturned appearance. They further suggest that, while a trunk would be present, it would likely not resemble that of modern elephants and instead be more robust and muscular, which they reason is evidenced by the lack of a proper insertion surface. Although later research concurs that the trunk or proboscis of Deinotherium was likely notably different from those of modern proboscideans, the idea of a short tapir-like trunk is questioned. In particular, it is pointed out that the tall stature and still relatively short neck of Deinotherium would render it very difficult for the animal to drink without assuming a more complex posture. Thus it is suggested that the trunk must have been at least long enough for the animal to effectively drink.

== Species ==
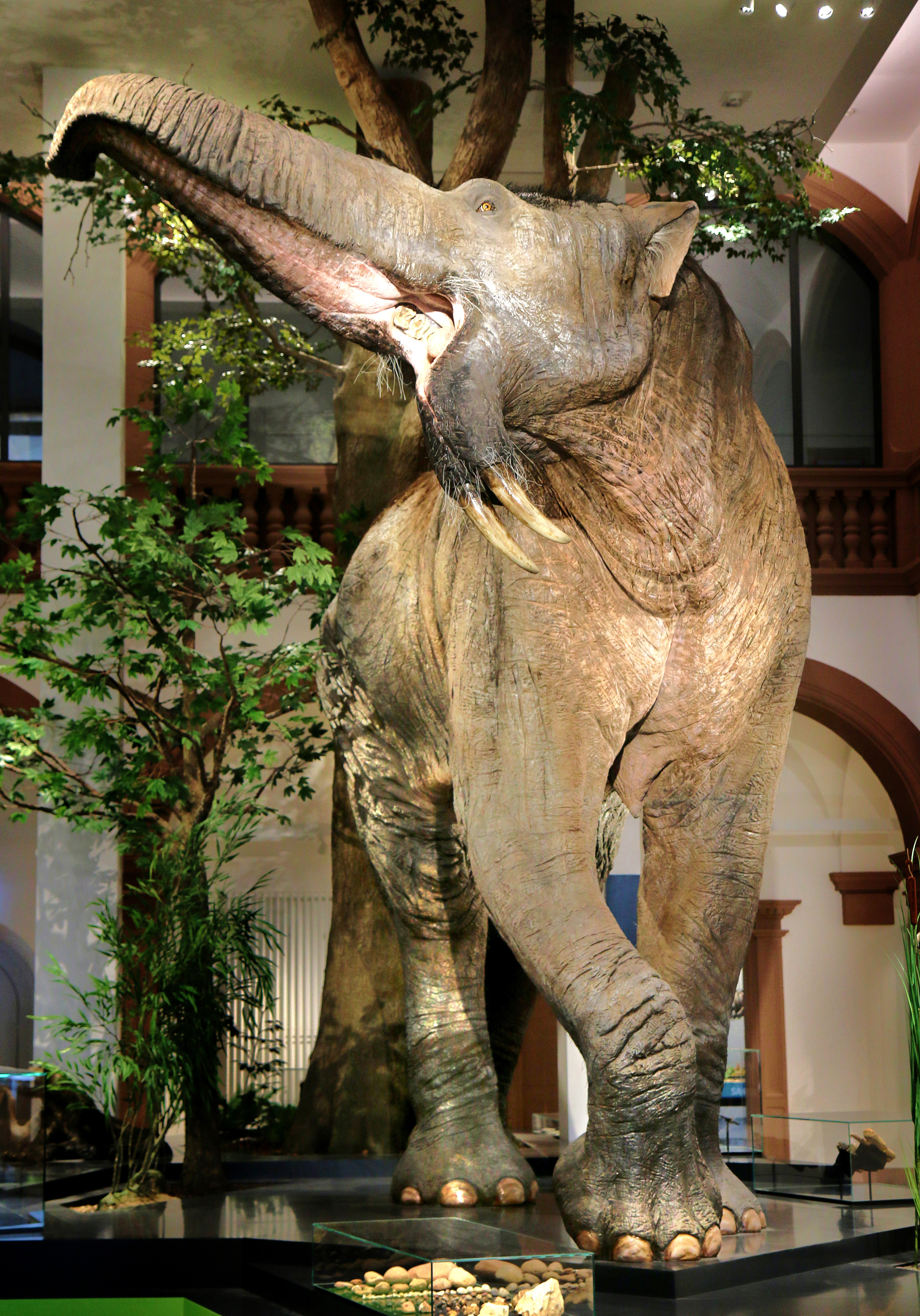
Deinotherium giganteum model at the Natural History Museum Mainz

Throughout the long history of deinotheriid research, 31 species have been described and assigned to the family, many on the basis of poorly sampled material, especially teeth of varying size. The amount of species recognized by authors differs depending on researchers, but the three species most commonly considered valid are listed below.

D. bozasi
Known from East Africa, as well as the Pliocene of Senegal in West Africa, Deinotherium bozasi was the last known species of Deinotherium, surviving in the Kanjera Formation, Kenya, until the early Pleistocene roughly 1 million years ago. It is characterized by a narrower rostral trough, a smaller but higher nasal aperture, a higher and narrower cranium, and a shorter mandibular symphysis than the other two species. In a 2013 publication Martin Pickford notes that D. bozasi has mandibles anatomically similar to those of D. proavum, however most specimens are smaller than those of the European species. To explain this, two hypotheses are suggested, one that they share a common ancestor and the other that D. bozasi may be an example of Allen's rule, which states that animals at lower latitudes are typically smaller than relatives at higher latitudes. However Markov and colleagues suggest that the similar mandibular anatomy may be a case of parallel evolution between late European species and D. bozasi in response to aridification and an increased need for effective mastication. It has been argued that Deinotherium bozasi probably descends from the African Prodeinotherium hobleyi, and that it doesn't share the same common ancestor as Eurasian Deinotherium, making Deinotherium potentially non-monophyletic as currently recognised.
D. giganteum
The type species D. giganteum was found in Europe from the Middle Miocene to Early Pliocene. However, the exact extinction of D. giganteum in Europe is unknown. The last known occurrences in Central and Western Europe appear to be in MN13 (Messinian to Zanclean), while material from Russia might extend the range of the species to MN15 (Ruscinian). Fossils of D. giganteum have also been found on the island of Crete in the upper Miocene Faneroméni Formation, during a time when the island was still connected to the mainland.

Fragment of left half of lower jaw with five molars of Deinotherium indicum from Piram Islands, India

D. indicum
The Asian species, D. indicum is distinguished by a more robust dentition as well as p4-m3 intravalley tubercles and found across India, specifically in Piram Islands and Tapar locality of Gujarat and Haritalyangar of Himachal Pradesh, during the Middle and Late Miocene. It disappeared from the fossil record about 7 million years ago (Late Miocene). Although it is generally regarded as valid, some researchers argue that it is synonymous with D. proavum and that the later name would take precedence. Pickford, for instance, argues that fossils from Iran create a geographic link between European populations and the Indian specimens, concluding that they may be one single wide ranging species. Some proboscidean post cranial material of exceptional size, possibly from Deinotherium indicum, were reported from Piram Island, Gujarat and were donated to the Indian Museum by Captain Fulljames in 1837, though these specimens are currently missing so it cannot be confirmed if they're really of Deinotherium indicum or any other large proboscidean.

One hypothesis opposing this three-species model suggests that, rather than being a single consistent species lasting throughout the Miocene, D. giganteum actually represents multiple chronospecies, with the type species only applying to the intermediate form.

Other species that have been described include:

D. levius (Jourdan, 1861)
D. levius is a European species of Deinotherium recovered from sediments dating to the late Astaracian to Aragonian. While it is considered a synonym of D. giganteum by some researchers, others propose that it is a stratigraphically distinct chronospecies and the earliest of European Deinotherium. In accordance to this hypothesis, D. levius would eventually give rise to D. giganteum by the Vallesian stage of the Miocene, after which the two species continued to coexist until the former's extinction.
D. proavum (Eichwald, 1831)
D. proavum is a large bodied species of Deinotherium that may be a junior synonym of Deinotherium giganteum. Other research meanwhile proposes that it, alongside D. giganteum and D. levius, is part of a single anagenetic lineage of Deinotherium species. For this hypothesis it has been suggested that it evolved from D. giganteum during the late Vallesion to Turolian, with early members of the species still being similar in size to its ancestor before surpassing it later during its range. However, the assignment of specimens to D. proavum is largely based on stratigraphy and size, making the differentiation between species difficult, especially with some research suggesting that the two species continued to coexist.

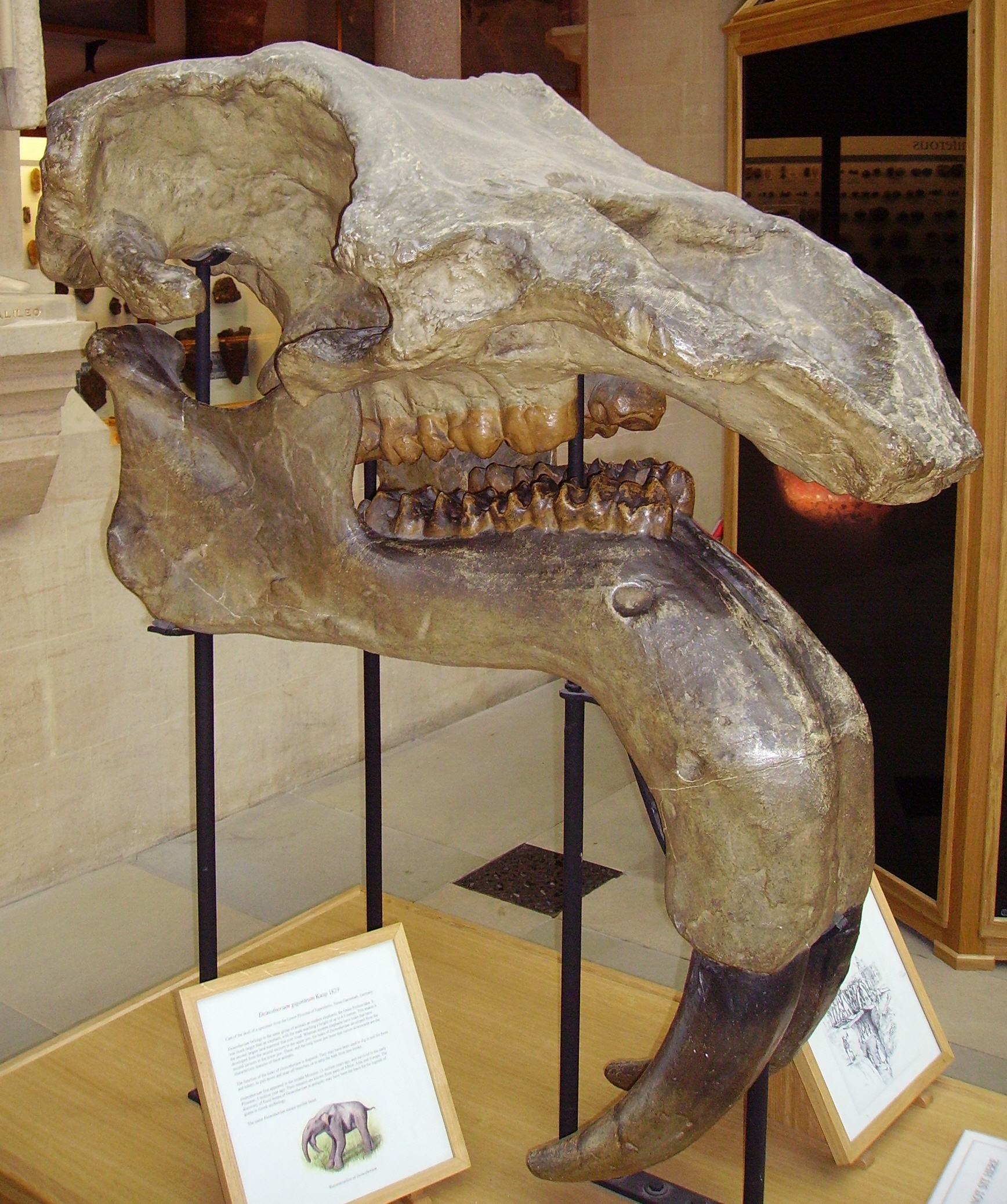
Skull of D. giganteum

D. gigantissimus
D. gigantissimus from Romania is typically considered to be a larger specimen belonging either to D. giganteum or D. proavum (depending on how many species are recognized by the respective author). The situation is similar in D. thraceiensis from Bulgaria, another notably large deinothere, described in 2006 but usually lumped into other European species by subsequent publications. The state of Asian species is especially complex, with a multitude of specimens being described from poor remains. These include D. sindiense (Lydekker, 1880), D. orlovii (Sahni and Tripathi, 1957), D. naricum (Pilgrim, 1908), and D. anguistidens (Koch 1845), all of which are generally considered dubious by publications of the 21st century. Only one other species from Africa was described, D. hopwoodi (Osborn, 1936), based on teeth from the Omo Basin in Ethiopia. However his research was published posthumously and was predated by D. bozasi, described two years prior.

Another matter that complicates the amount of Deinotherium species recognized by science is the state of the genus Prodeinotherium. One prevailing theory is that Prodeinotherium is a distinct genus ancestral to the larger Deinotherium species. Other researchers, however, argue that the anatomical differences, the difference in size in particular, are not enough to properly distinguish the two, which would subsequently render species of Prodeinotherium as Deinotherium instead. This would create the combinations D. bavaricum, D. cuvieri (both European), D. hobleyi (Africa), P. pentapotamiae, and possibly D. sinense (Asia).

== Distribution ==
Deinotherium was a widespread genus, found across vast areas of East Africa, Europe, the Arabian Peninsula and South to East Asia. In Europe fossils are especially common in the southeast, with up to half of known specimens in the region originating in Bulgaria. Especially significant specimens include those found in Ezerovo, Plovdiv Province (type specimen of D. thraceiensis) and near Varna. Romania likewise yielded significant remains, with one notably large specimen being found by Grigoriu Ștefănescu near Mânzați (type specimen of D. gigantissimum). The fossils of the two now-invalid species are displayed at the National Museum of Natural History, Bulgaria and the Grigore Antipa National Museum of Natural History, Romania respectively. Multiple specimens have also been found in Greece and even on the island of Crete, indicating that the large animal had traveled there over a potential landbridge. Towards the east Deinotherium is known from finds in Russia (Rostov-on-Don), Georgia, and Turkey.

Deinotherium may have ranged as far north as southern Finland, based on a fragmentary humerus provisionally identified as belonging to Deinotherium found in glacial erratic deposits in the region. The western range of Deinotherium spans most of West and Central Europe including Hungary, the Czech Republic (Františkovy Lázně), Austria (Gratkorn Locality), Switzerland (Jura Mountains), France ("Field of Giants"), Portugal, Spain and Germany. Some of the earliest and most significant finds in Germany have been made in the Dinotheriensande (Eppelsheim Formation) of the Mainz Basin, named for their great abundance of deinothere remains. The holotype specimen of Deinotherium, described by Kaup in the early 1800s, stems from this part of Europe.

The range of Deinotherium furthermore extends over the Middle East and the Indian Subcontinent. Fossils are known from the Arabian Peninsula (including the Baynunah Formation of the United Arab Emirates), Iran, and multiple localities on the Indian subcontinent such as the Siwalik Hills and the D. incidum holotype Perim locality in Gujarat.

In Africa, records of Deinotherium bozasi have been found primarily in the eastern part of the continent, with specimens known Wadi Natrun in Egypt, from the Olduvai Gorge in Tanzania, the Omo Basin, Hadar Formation and Middle Awash of Ethiopia, in the Chemoigut Beds around Lake Baringo, Kubi Algi Formation and Koobi Fora in Kenya, the Praia de Morrungusu locality in Mozambique, and the Chiwondo Beds in Malawi. An additional tooth is known from Sahabi, Libya and it's possible that both Deinotherium and Prodeinotherium coexisted in the Kenyan Ngorora Formation. A record of D. bozasi has also been reported from the Pliocene aged Tobène locality in Senegal in West Africa, indicating the species had a wider distribution than eastern Africa.

== Evolution ==
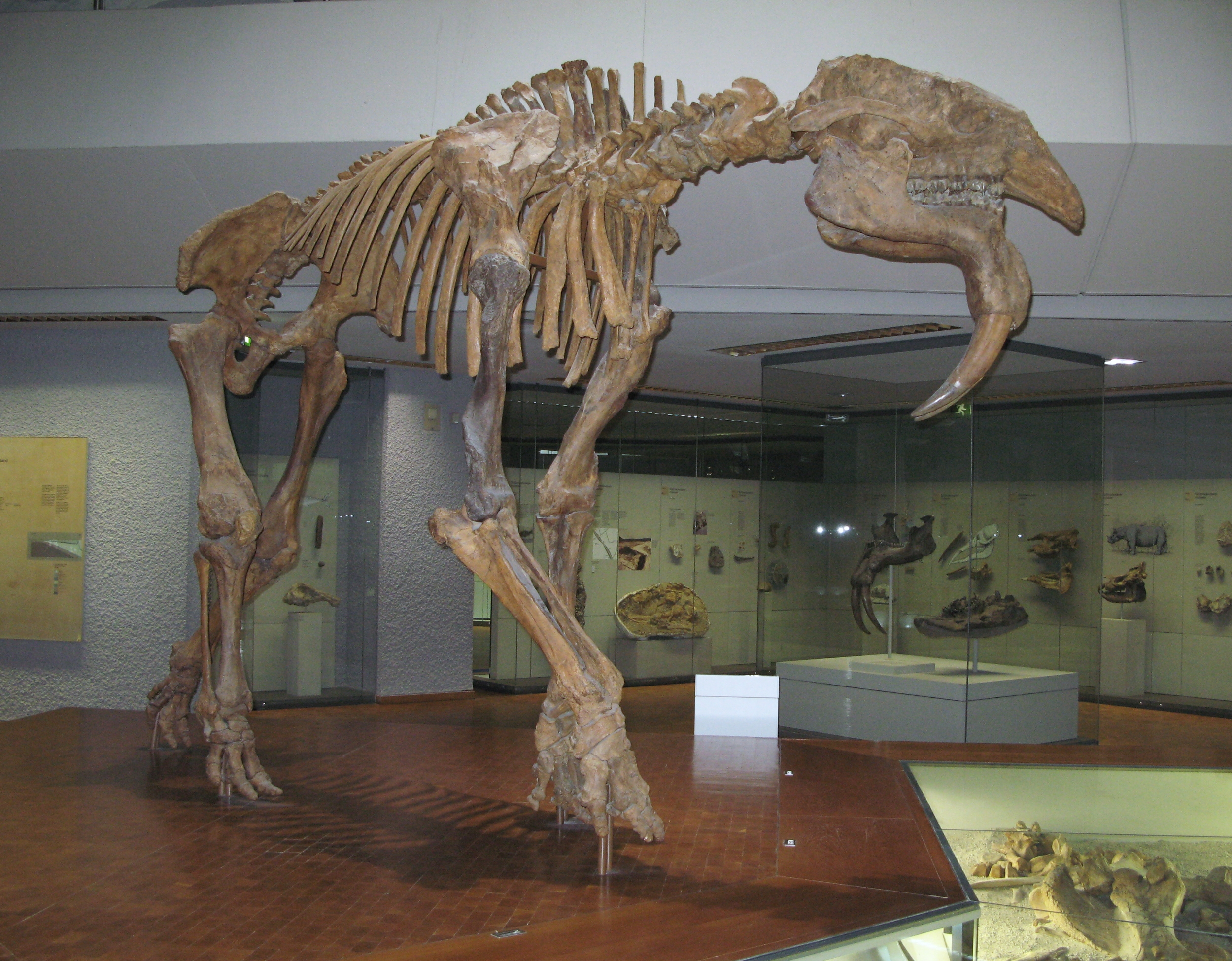
Mount of ancestor, Prodeinotherium

Proboscidea originated in Africa during the Paleocene, approximately 60 million years ago. Deinotheres are thought to have split from the ancestors of modern elephants over 44 million years ago during the Eocene, based on the age of Dagbatitherium which is more closely related to modern elephants than to deinotheres.

Phylogeny of Proboscidea showing the position of Deinotherium, following Hautier et al. 2021:

- Proboscidea
  - †Eritherium
  - - †Phosphatherium
    - - †Daouitherium
      - - †Numidotherium
        - - †Barytherium
          - - †Arcanotherium
            - - †Omanitherium
              - - †Saloumia
                - †Moeritherium
                - - †Deinotheriidae
                    - Chilgatherium
                    - Deinotheriinae (Prodeinotherium + Deinotherium)
                  - Elephantiformes
                    - †Dagbatitherium
                    - - †Palaeomastodon
                      - - †Phiomia
                        - Elephantimorpha

The earliest fossils attributed to deinotheriids are known from the Oligocene of Ethiopia in East Africa around 28-27 million years ago, belonging to the relatively small taxon Chilgatherium, though the deinotheriid affinities of Chilgatherium have been doubted by some authors. The oldest undoubted deinothere remains are known from the late Oligocene of Kenya, around 27-24 million years ago. Initially restricted to Afro-Arabia (the then isolated landmass consisting of Africa and the Arabian Peninsula), the continued northward movement of the African Plate eventually caused the formation of the Gomphotherium land bridge during the Early Miocene, around 18-19 million years ago allowing proboscideans spread into Eurasia, among them Prodeinotherium, thought to be the direct ancestor of the larger Deinotherium. Generally, Deinotherium displays relatively little change in morphology throughout its evolution, but a steady increase in body size from 2 meters shoulder height in Prodeinotherium to up to 4 meters in later Deinotherium species and a mass far exceeding even large African elephants. The reasons for this rapid increase in body size is interpreted to have had multiple factors influencing it. On the one hand, increased size is an effective predator deterrent, especially during the Miocene when carnivorans had reached a great diversity including hyaenodonts, amphicyonids and large cats. Secondly, continued aridification during the Miocene increasingly split up woodlands, with greater distances of open landscape stretching between the food sources of browsers such as Deinotherium. This also accounts for the morphological adaptations seen in the limbs of Deinotherium, better suited for long distance travel. Furthermore, the appearance of Deinotherium coincided with falling temperatures during the middle Miocene. According to Bergmann's rule, these circumstances favor increased body mass for maintaining heat in cold temperatures. Despite the many key adaptations deinotheres developed for effective foraging, the continued aridification that progressed throughout the Miocene eventually led to the extinction of the group, which failed to survive without readily available food sources matching their diet. Populations in Western Europe were the first to disappear, followed later by those in Eastern Europe.

In the Indian subcontinent, remains of Deinotherium span from around 13.5 million years ago to 8 million years ago. Deinotherium first appeared in Europe around 13-11 million years ago (MN 7-8), and disappeared from the region at the end of the Miocene, approximately 6-5 million years ago. In Africa, Deinotherium ranged from the Late Miocene, around 13-10 million years ago, until the end of the Early Pleistocene, around 1 million years ago. The extinction of Deinotherium in Africa in the Early Pleistocene likely related to the spread of C_{4} grasslands.

== Paleoecology ==
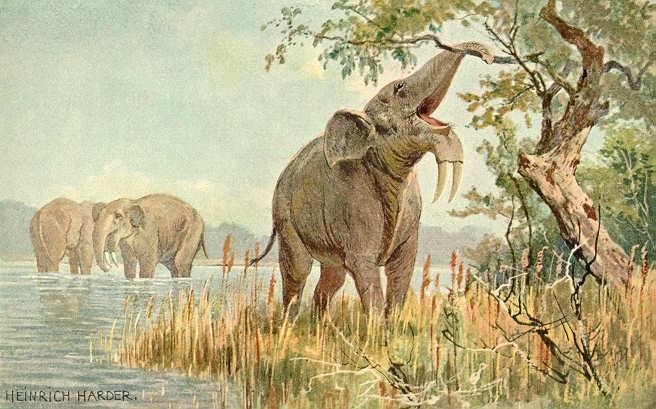
Historic illustration of Deinotherium by Heinrich Harder

Several key adaptations and isotopic evidence suggest that Deinotherium was a folivorous, browsing proboscidean that preferred open woodland habitats and fed on the leaves of the tree canopy. In Asia D. indicum has been associated with wet and warm woodland and in Portugal deinotheriid remains were found in regions corresponding with moist, tropical to subtropical woodland conditions likened to modern Senegal. A browsing lifestyle is supported by the inclination of the occiput that gives Deinotherium a slightly more raised head posture, and their teeth, which strongly resemble those of modern tapirs, animals that predominantly feed on fruits, flowers, bark and leaves. Their limbs show some notable differences to Prodeinotherium, allowing for a more agile mode of locomotion and allowing for easier travel across open landscapes in the search of food, which coincides with the widespread breakup of forests and expansion of grasslands during the time Deinotherium lived in Europe. Fossil finds from the Austrian Gratkorn locality and the Mainz Basin in Germany indicate that Deinotherium individuals inhabited relatively broad areas and were not confined to small home ranges. In Austria it has been suggested that they traversed areas on a regular basis, while in Germany there is evidence for the animals range shifting with changing climatic conditions, present during subtropical climate conditions and absent in subboreal conditions. Dental microwear indicates that D. giganteum browsed on dicotyledonous foliage.

One of the most enigmatic features of Deinotherium are their downturned tusks and their function. Research conducted on Deinotherium suggests that these tusks were likely not used for digging, nor are they sexually dimorphic, leaving use in feeding as their most likely function. These tusks exhibit patterns of wear, in particular on their medial and caudal sides. In a 2001 paper Markov and colleagues argue that Deinotherium could have used its tusks to remove branches that would have gotten in the way of feeding, while using the proboscis to transport leaf material into its mouth. From there Deinotherium would have used a powerful tongue (inferred based on a notable trough at the front of the symphysis) to further manipulate its food. Different tusk anatomy in young individuals would suggest altered feeding strategies in juveniles.
