= William J. Sanders =

American paleontologist

William J. Sanders is a vertebrate paleontologist and research scientist/preparator at the University of Michigan. He has written a number of papers on fossil elephants.

== Education ==
- Ph.D. Department of Anthropology, New York University. Dissertation Title: "Function, Allometry, and Evolution of the Australopithecine Lower Precaudal Spine." 1995.
- M.Phil. Department of Anthropology, New York University. 1990.
- B.A. Department of Anthropology, The University of Chicago. 1979.
