= Wissberg =

Mountain in Switzerland

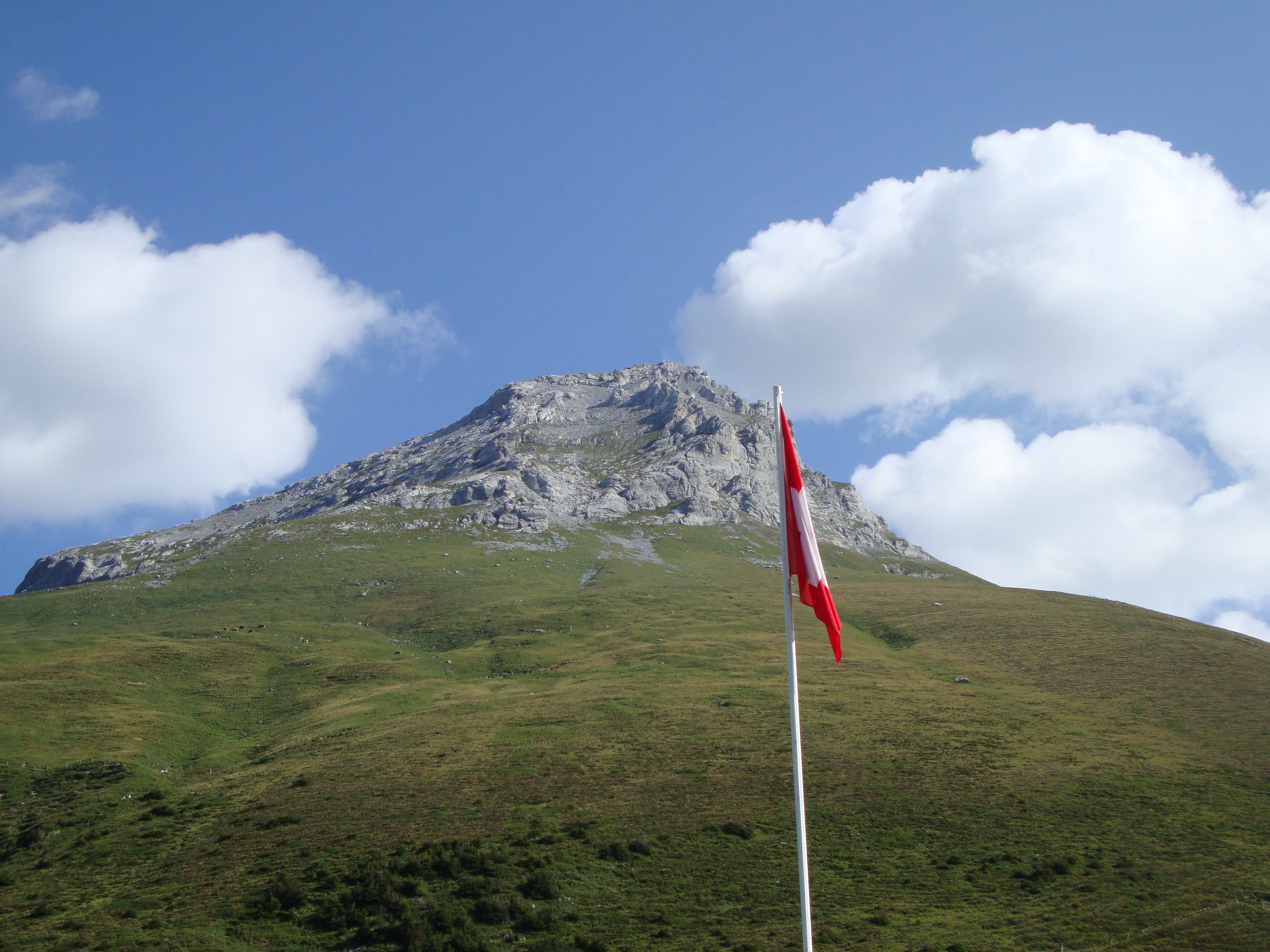
- View from Fürenalp (south side)

Highest point
- Elevation: 2,627 m (8,619 ft)
- Prominence: 57 m (187 ft)
- Parent peak: Wissigstock
- Coordinates: 46°48′49.1″N 8°28′41.4″E

Geography
- Location within Switzerland
- Location: Obwalden/Uri, Switzerland
- Parent range: Urner Alps

The Wissberg is a mountain of the Urner Alps, located east of Engelberg in Central Switzerland. Its summit lies on the border between the cantons of Obwalden and Uri.
