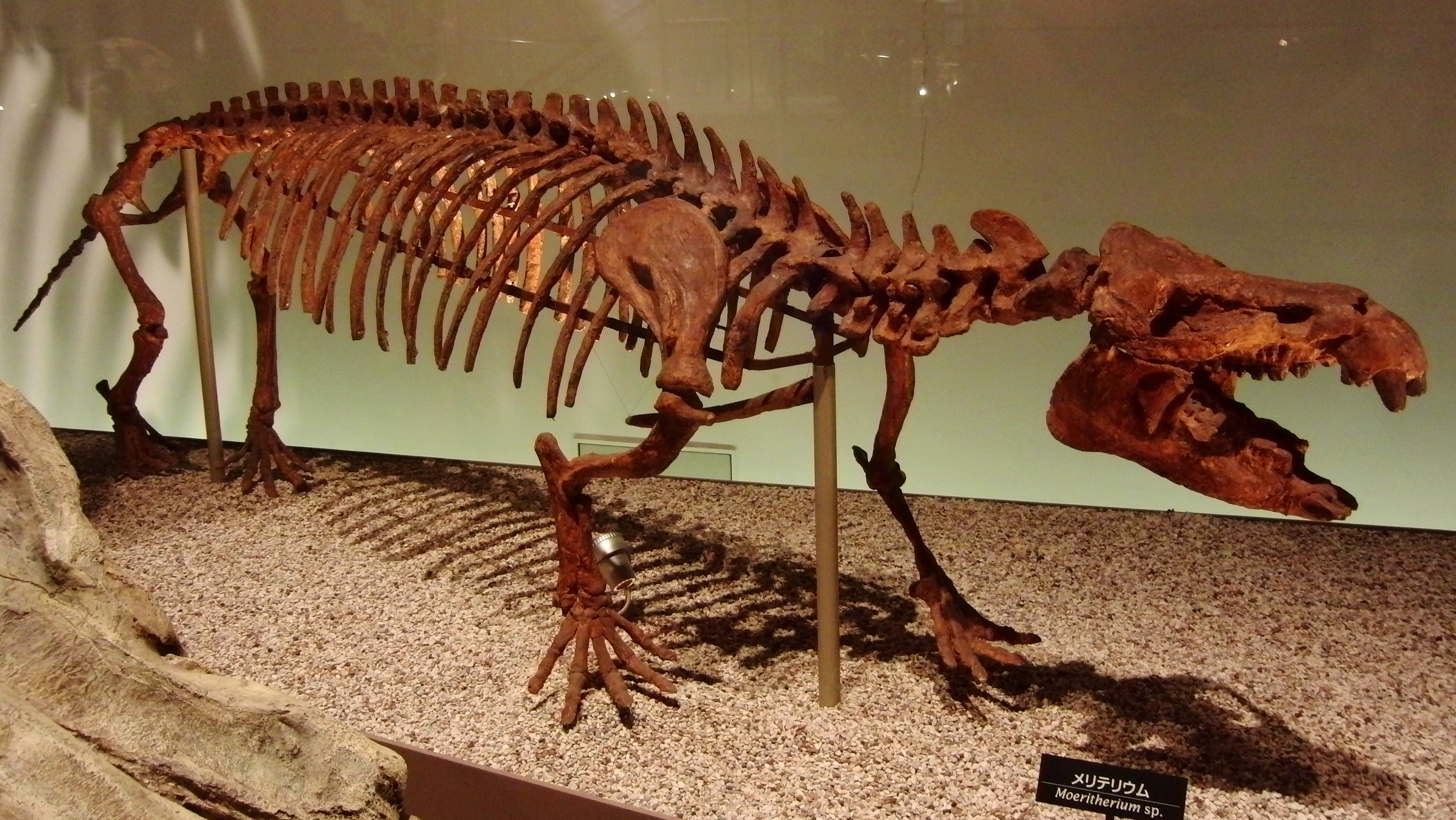
- Skeleton of Moeritherium at the National Museum of Nature and Science, Tokyo, Japan

Scientific classification
- Kingdom: Animalia
- Phylum: Chordata
- Class: Mammalia
- Infraclass: Placentalia
- Order: Proboscidea
- Family: †Moeritheriidae; C.W. Andrews, 1906
- Genus: †Moeritherium; C.W. Andrews, 1901

Type species
- Moeritherium lyonsi Andrews, 1901

Species
- †M. gracile C.W. Andrews, 1902; †M. trigodon C.W. Andrews, 1904; †M. andrewsi Schlosser, 1911; †M. chehbeurameuri Delmer et al., 2006

= Moeritherium =

Moeritherium Temporal range: Late Eocene, 37–35 Ma

Extinct genus of mammals

Moeritherium ("Lake Moeris' beast") is an extinct genus of basal proboscideans from the Eocene of North and West Africa. The first specimen was discovered in strata from the Fayum fossil deposits of Egypt. It was named in 1901 by Charles William Andrews, who suggested that it was an early proboscidean, perhaps ancestral to mastodons, although subsequent workers considered it everything from a relative of manatees to a close relative of both clades' common ancestor. Currently, Moeritherium is seen as a proboscidean that, while fairly basal, diverged before the split between elephantiforms and deinotheres. Seven species have been named, though five (M. andrewsi, M. chehbeurameuri, M. gracile, M. lyonsi, and M. trigodon) are currently considered valid. The name comes from Lake Moeris, and the Ancient Greek θηρίον (thēríon), meaning "beast".

Moeritherium is unusual even among basal proboscidean standards. The largest species, M. andrewsi, would have stood about 75 cm (30 in; 2 ft 6 in) at the shoulder and weighed 290 kg (640 lb). Like many later members of the group, it had two sets of tusks: the ones on the upper jaw pointed downwards, while those of the mandible (lower jaw) were flat and formed a spade shape. In addition to these tusks, it retained its upper canines, though had lost the lower set. The morphology of the skull, particularly the nasal cavity (which was only slightly retracted), suggests that Moeritherium lacked a trunk. It may have instead possessed a small, tapir-like proboscis, formed from the fusion of the upper lip and the nose, an evolutionary precursor of trunks. Though poorly described in the literature, Moeritherium's torso is known to have been very long, and its limbs were short. These divergent traits have led to comparisons with desmostylians, a lineage of extinct mammals formerly believed to have been relatives of manatees.

Moeritherium has been suggested to have led a semi-aquatic lifestyle. While this originally stemmed from perceived similarities to sirenians (manatees and dugongs), morphological data and isotope analysis has since lent it a great deal of support. The elongated body of Moeritherium, and the high position of its eyes and ears, are likely a result of its lifestyle, and its unusual dentition is likely an adaptation for feeding on water plants.

== Taxonomy ==
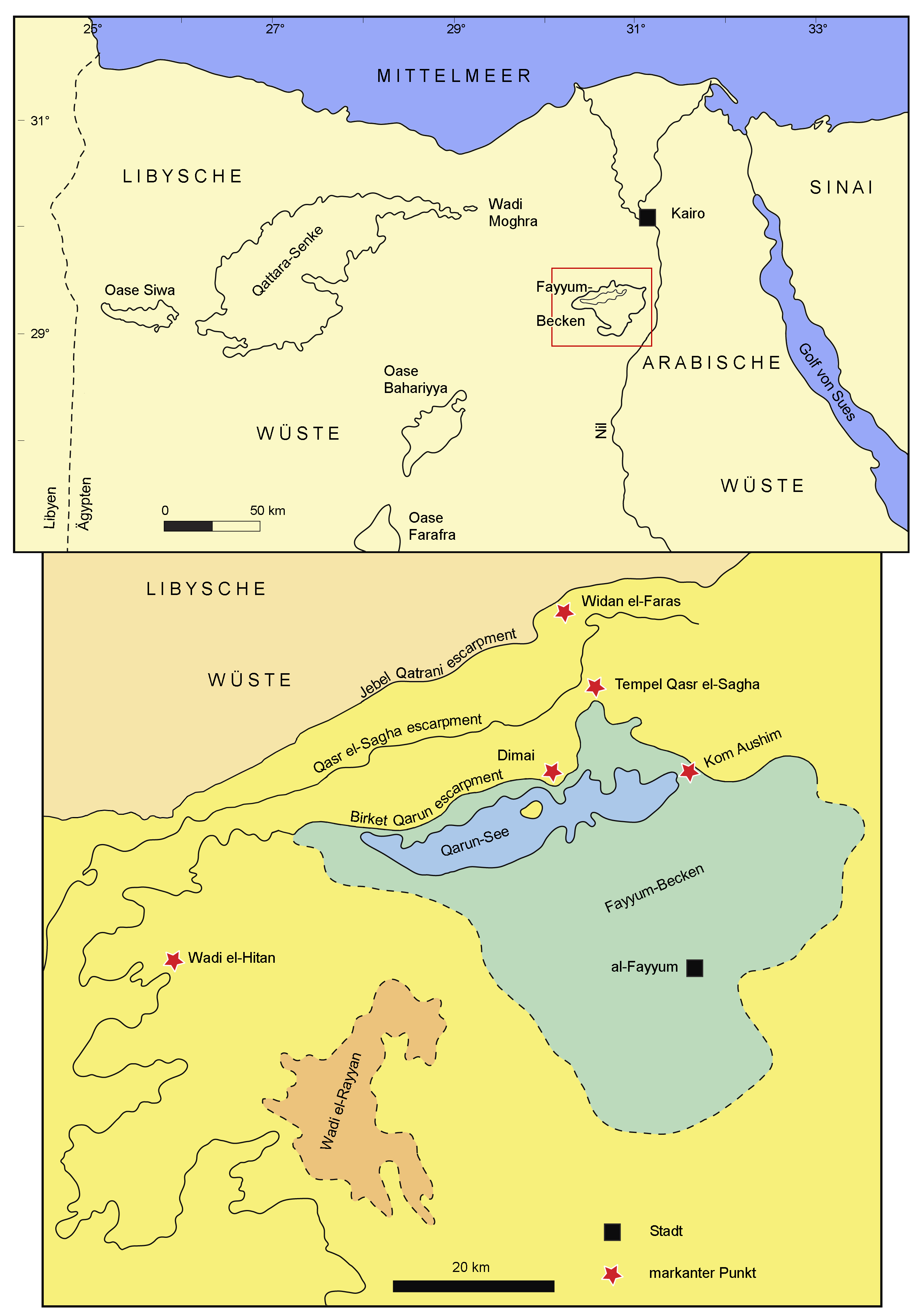
Map of the Fayum area of Egypt

=== Early history ===
The type species of Moeritherium, M. lyonsi, was discovered in strata belonging to the Qasr el Sagha Formation in the Fayum fossil deposits of Egypt. The type specimen (CGM C.10000) consists of an almost complete mandible. It was described in 1901 by Charles William Andrews, who proposed two hypotheses for its phylogenetic position: either Moeritherium was part of the obsolete order Amblypoda, or it was an early proboscidean, perhaps "a generalised forerunner of the Mastodon type". In any case, he regarded it as an ungulate.

=== Additional species ===
In 1902, after conducting a more thorough examination of specimens collected by himself and his colleague, Hugh John Llewellyn Beadnell, he named a second species from the Qasr el Sagha, M. gracile; a third was recognised in the same paper, though he did not provide a name, and referred to it simply as M. sp. The two species were distinguished from M. lyonsi by a more gracile build and a larger body size respectively. The lack of material overlap has made it difficult to determine how M. gracile actually relates to M. lyonsi, as their holotypes consist of different skull elements; the type specimen of the former (CGM C.10003) is a palate with no associated lower teeth. Regardless, they are treated as belonging to the same genus, and are likely separate. Two years later, a fourth taxon, M. trigodon, was described, also by Andrews, based on remains recovered from the "fluvio-marine beds" (equivalent to the Jebel Qatrani Formation) around the lake Birket-el-Qurun. In 1955, over half a century after the genus' initial naming, Sri Lankan artist and palaeontologist Paulus Edward Pieris Deraniyagala named two additional species, P. latidens and P. pharaonensis, based on isolated mandibular fragments.

In 1911, German zoologist Max Schlosser divided M. lyonsi into two species: M. lyonsi, restricted to the Qasr el Sagha Formation, and M. andrewsi, restricted to the Jebel Qatrani. This classification, however, has been rejected. In 1971, German zoologist Heinz Tobien opted to synonymise the entire genus with M. lyonsi, though he chose to altogether disregard, Deraniyagala's species, likely as they were poorly diagnostic. In 2006, Cyrile Delmer et al. published a paper describing a new Moeritherium species, M. chehbeurameuri, from Bir El Ater, Algeria. In their paper, they treated most of the above species (with the exception of M. latidens and M. pharaonensis) as valid. While the paper was not intended as a systematic revision, they chose to treat at the very least three species as valid: the type species M. lyonsi, M. gracile, and M. chehbeaurameuri. In 2026, Asier Larramendi and Marco P. Ferretti recognised five species: M. andrewsi, M. chehbeurameuri, M. gracile, M. lyonsi, and M. trigonodon.

=== Classification ===
Henry Fairfield Osborn, in 1909, suggested that Moeritherium was more similar to sirenians (manatees and dugongs, and their extinct kin) to any living or extinct proboscidean. In 1921, however, he rejected this view, and divided Proboscidea into four suborders or superfamilies: Moeritherioidea, Deinotherioidea, Mastodontoidea, and Elephantoidea. In a 1988 paper discussing the systematics of proboscideans, Pascal Tassy abandoned this system and neglected to provide any superfamily-rank clades. Erecting the suborder Elephantiformes, Tassy placed Moeritherium outside it, alongside Barytherium, Numidotherium, and the Deinotheriidae. He considered Moeritherium among the most basal proboscideans, with Numidotherium being the most basal and Barytherium being only slightly less basal than that. In a 2021 paper describing a new genus (Dagbatitherium tassyi) Lionel Hautier and colleagues ran a phylogenetic analysis which recovered Moeritherium as sister to a clade including deinotheres and elephantiforms.

A cladogram of Proboscidea, based on the phylogenetic analysis conducted Hautier and colleagues in 2021, is below:

- Proboscidea
  - Eritherium
  - - Phosphatherium
    - - Daouitherium
      - - Numidotherium
        - - Barytherium
          - - Arcanotherium
            - - Omanitherium
              - - Saloumia
                - Moeritherium
                - - Deinotheriidae
                  - Elephantiformes
                    - Dagbatitherium
                    - - Palaeomastodon
                      - - Phiomia
                        - Elephantimorpha

== Description ==
Size comparison of Moeritherium lysoni compared to a human

Moeritherium was a fairly small, very elongate taxon. It was smaller than most later proboscideans. The species M. lyonsi had an estimated body length of 230 cm (91 in; 7 ft 7 in), measured only 70 cm (28 in; 2 ft 4 in) at the shoulder, and a body mass of 235 kg (518 lb), though Moeritherium exhibited strong size-based sexual dimorphism, so this estimate should be considered a crude average. According to Asier Larramendi and Marco P. Ferretti, the smallest species was M. gracile, which was 50 cm (1.6 ft) at the shoulder and weighed 85 kg (187 lb); the largest was M. andrewsi, estimated at 75 cm (30 in; 2 ft 6 in) at the shoulder and 290 kg (640 lb) in body mass.

=== Skull and dentition ===
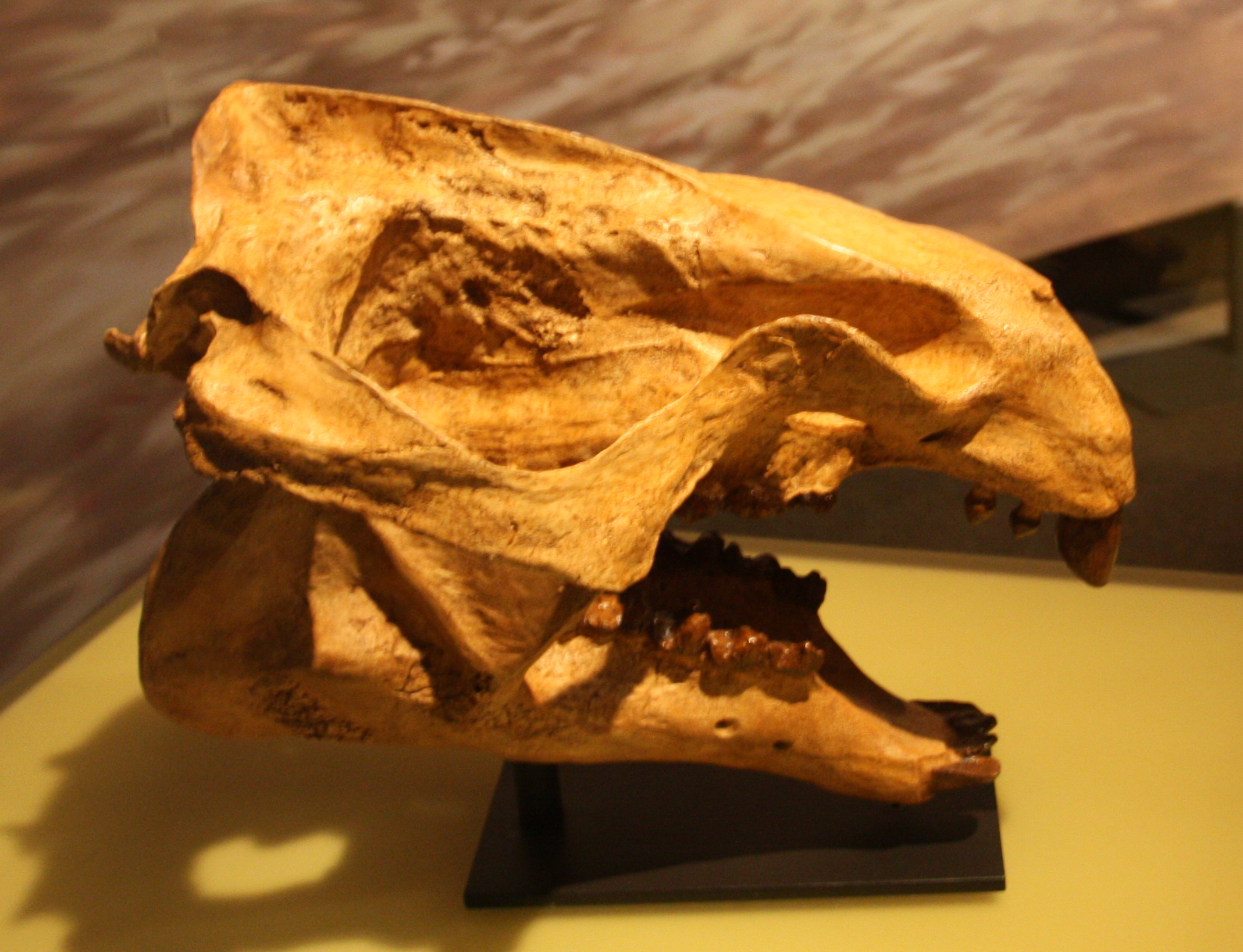
Closeup of the skull of Moeritherium lyonsi

The skull of Moeritherium was long, slender, and very low for the entirety of its length. The cranial region is nearly twice as long as the facial region. The orbit (eye socket) occupied a fairly anterodorsal position, meaning that it sat towards the front and top of the skull, and resembled that of sirenians. Unlike later proboscideans, the naris (nasal cavity) was fairly close to the front of the skull, which, in conjunction with the length of the mandible, suggests that a conventional trunk was absent in Moeritherium. It may have instead possessed a wide, mobile unit comprising the nose and upper lip, similar to the proboscis of modern tapirs. The external ear would have been high up on the skull, which may have been an adaptation for a semiaquatic lifestyle; the same, however, is observed in other proboscideans that are unlikely to have been aquatic, such as Gomphotherium and Palaeomastodon.

Moeritherium has a dental formula of 3.1.3.32.0.3.3. (Note: 3 incisors, 1 canine, 3 premolars and 3 molars in each half of the upper jaw, and 2 incisors, no canines, 3 premolars and 3 molars in each half of the lower jaw) The first lower incisors sit close together, forming a spade shape, while the equivalent set on the upper jaw, actually the second incisors (as in later genera), were modified into short, curved tusks. Moeritherium still retained the first and third upper incisors, and the upper canines, though in a highly reduced form. The cheek teeth (the premolars and molars) were bunodont, bearing rounded cusps, though were also lophodont, bearing large ridges called lophs between cusps. The premolars are large and broad in relation to the molars, a condition not seen in more derived proboscideans, though similar to in manatees.

=== Postcranial skeleton ===
The postcranial anatomy of Moeritherium has been compared to desmostylians, such as Pezosiren. Both taxa have an extremely elongated, broad torso, possibly an adaptation for diving in both taxa. Little of the cervical (neck) vertebrae is known, save for the atlas and some of the middle cervical vertebrae. Most of the vertebral column, save for some cervical vertebrae and one of the thoracic (upper body) vertebrae, is known from a specimen that was at some point catalogued as C. 10005, probably belonging to M. lyonsi. A more complete specimen of Moeritherium is known, though has not been described in detail. Like modern proboscideans, there twenty-three presacral vertebrae (those preceding the sacrum). The lumbar (lower back) region was longer proportionally than in modern proboscideans, while the thoracic region was slightly shorter. Moeritherium's limbs were extremely short compared to those of later taxa, being roughly half as big, proportionally, as those of extant elephants.

== Palaeobiology ==
=== Lifestyle ===
The notion of Moeritherium being semi-aquatic dates as far back as 1909, when Henry Fairfield Osborn suggested that it was not only related to sirenians, but resembled them in habits. In his 1923 paper discussing the genus' morphology, Japanese zoologist Matsumoto Hikoshichirō listed adaptations that indicated a semi-aquatic lifestyle (such as the high position of the eyes and ears), though also listed several that were evidence against it (such as its dentition, which to him seemed better-suited to a terrestrial forager). In his view, Moeritherium was unlikely to be semi-aquatic. However, similarities with desmostylians have been noted in the postcranial skeleton, and its unusual limb proportions have been cited as the product of a semi-aquatic lifestyle. In 2008, stable isotopic analysis lent further credence to the semiaquatic model, with its oxygen isotope ratios more closely resembling those of aquatic ones than fully terrestrial ones, with it being suggested that Moeritherium likely consumed freshwater plants. Dental microwear also suggests that M. lyonsi and M. trigodon consumed aquatic plants.

== Palaeoenvironment ==
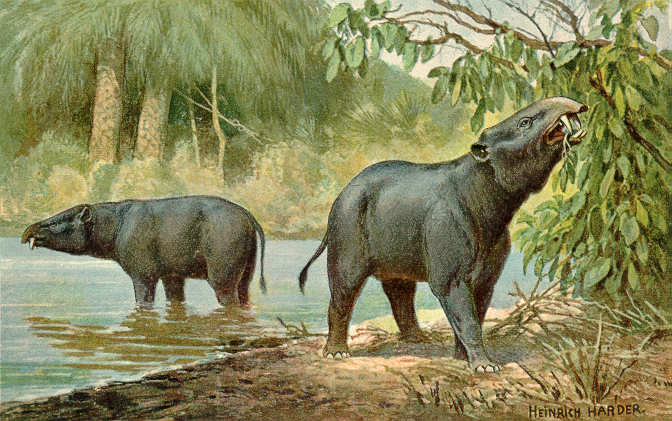
Depiction of foraging Moeritherium by Heinrich Harder. The proportions of the body are incorrect, as the torso should be longer and the limbs should be shorter.

The environment of the Jebel Qatrani Formation, from which some specimens of Moeritherium are known, have been described as a subtropical to tropical lowland plain by Bown, who further suggests the presence of streams and ponds.

Based on the occurrence of birds that are associated with water (such as ospreys, early flamingos, jacanas, herons, storks, cormorants and shoebills), Rasmussen and colleagues similarly inferred that the environment featured slow-moving freshwater with a substantial amount of aquatic vegetation. Although lithology suggests that most fossils were deposited on sandbanks after being transported by currents, the authors argue that swamps could have easily formed along the banks of the river that was present during the Oligocene and may account for the mudstone found in certain quarries. They furthermore suggest that the fossil birds of Fayum, due to their affinities with modern groups, should be considered a more valuable indicator of the environment when compared with the fossil mammals, many of which belonged to families lacking modern examples. The absence of other birds typical for such an environment may be explained either through sampling bias or due to the fact that said groups had simply not yet been present in Oligocene Africa. Generally, Rasmussen and colleagues compare the environment of Jebel Qatrani to freshwater habitats in modern Central Africa. The discovery of snakehead fossils seem to support Rasmussen's interpretation, as the Parachanna today prefers slow-moving backwaters with plenty of vegetation. Other fish present meanwhile, notably Tylochromis, suggest that deep, open water was likewise present. The river channels may have been overgrown with reeds, papyrus and featured floating vegetation like water lilies and Salvinia.

In a 2001 paper Rasmussen et al. argued that the sandstone and mudstone of the formation likely formed as sediments were aggraded by a system of river channels that emptied towards the west into the Tethys. Here they reconstructed the environment as a tropical lowland swamp forest intermingled with marshes. They furthermore suggest that the environment would have experienced monsoons.

Overall this indicates that this region was a part of an extensive belt of tropical forest that stretched across what is now northern Africa, which would gradually give rise to open woodland and even steppe the further one was to travel inland.
