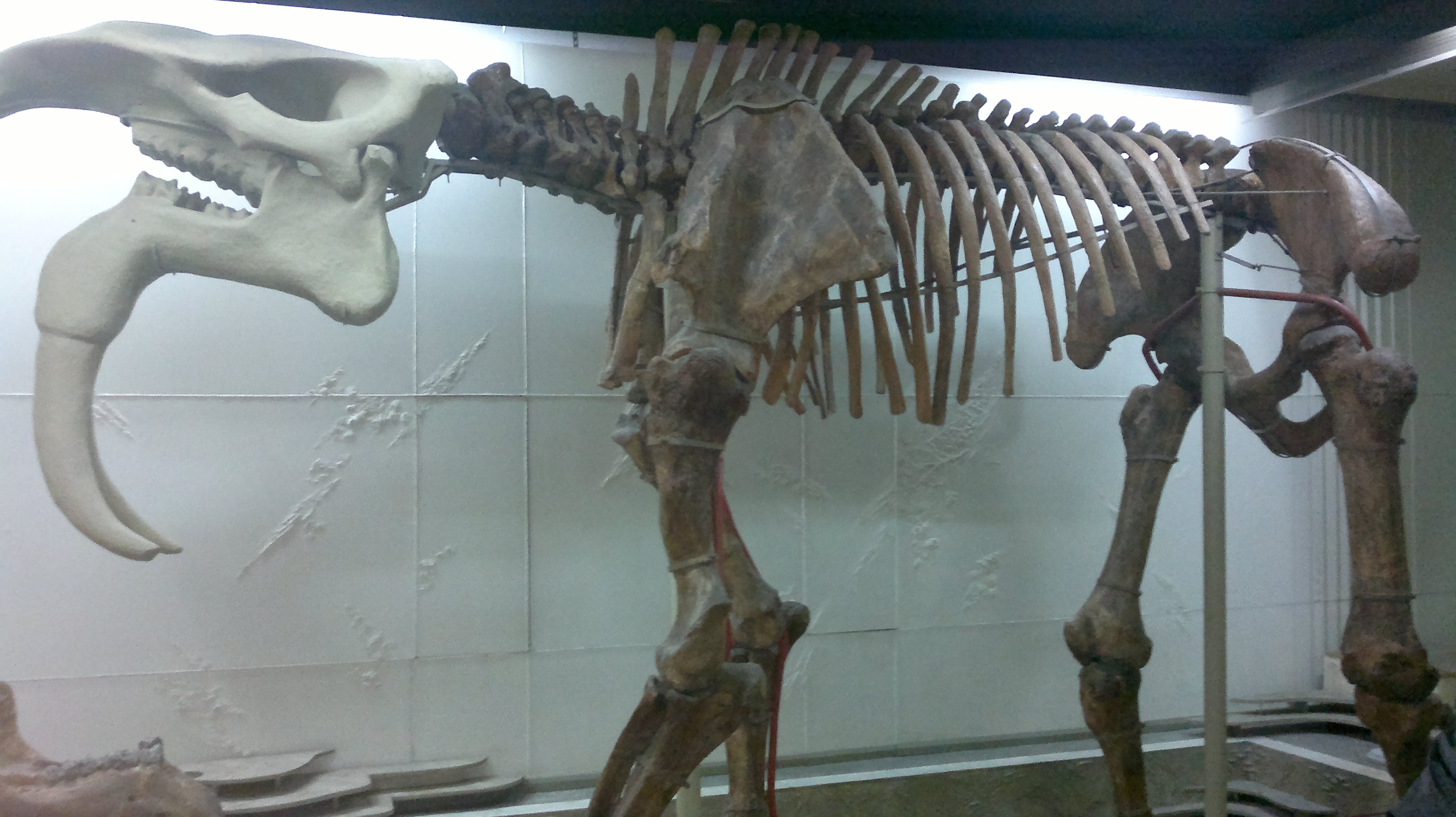
- Partial skeleton of a Deinotherium gigantissimum in the National Museum of Ethnography and Natural History in Chisinau.

Scientific classification
- Domain: Eukaryota
- Kingdom: Animalia
- Phylum: Chordata
- Class: Mammalia
- Order: Proboscidea
- Suborder: †Plesielephantiformes; Shoshani et al., 2001

Families
- †Numidotheriidae; †Barytheriidae; †Deinotheriidae

= Plesielephantiformes =

Plesielephantiformes Temporal range: 56–2 Ma Early Eocene to Early Pleistocene

Extinct suborder of mammals

Plesielephantiformes is a proposed suborder of the Proboscidea, the group containing elephants and their close relatives. It was named and circumscribed in a 2001 study by Jeheskel Shoshani and colleagues to include Deinotheriidae, as well as Numidotheriidae and Barytheriidae. While originally proposed to represent a monophyletic clade, based on the supposed unifying character of having bilophodont teeth, most modern phylogenetic studies of Proboscidea find the group to be paraphyletic, with Deinotheriidae more closely related to Elephantiformes than to other supposed members of the group.

Cladogram after Hautier et al. 2021:

- Proboscidea
  - Eritherium
  - - Phosphatherium
    - - Daouitherium
      - - Numidotherium
        - - Barytherium
          - - Arcanotherium
            - - Omanitherium
              - - Saloumia
                - Moeritherium
                - - Deinotheriidae
                  - Elephantiformes
                    - Dagbatitherium
                    - - Palaeomastodon
                      - - Phiomia
                        - Elephantimorpha
