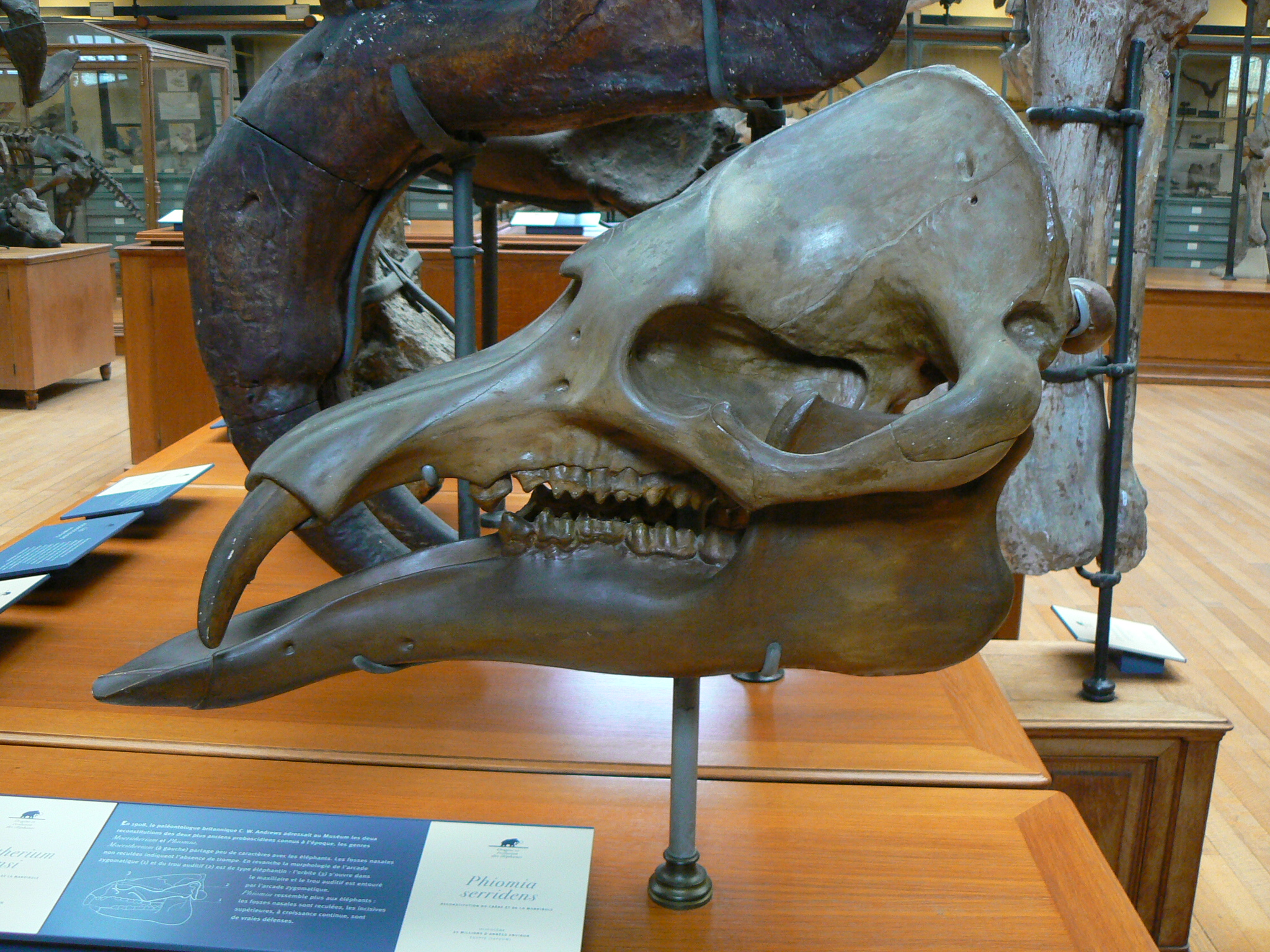
- P. serridens skull

Scientific classification
- Kingdom: Animalia
- Phylum: Chordata
- Class: Mammalia
- Infraclass: Placentalia
- Order: Proboscidea
- Suborder: Elephantiformes
- Family: †Phiomiidae
- Genus: †Phiomia; Andrews & Beadnell, 1902

Type species
- Phiomia serridens Andrews & Beadnell, 1902

Species
- P. serridens Andrews & Beadnell, 1902; P. major Sanders & Kappelman, 2004

= Phiomia =

Phiomia Temporal range: Late Eocene-Early Oligocene ~37–30 Ma

Genus of mammals

Phiomia (after the Ancient Greek phiom "lake", an ancient name for the Fayum) is an extinct genus of basal elephantiform proboscidean that lived in what is now Northern Africa during the Late Eocene to Early Oligocene some 37–30 million years ago. The type specimen of Phiomia, part of the mandible (lower jaw), was described in 1902 by Charles William Andrews and Hugh John Llewellyn. Unsure of its identity, they assigned it, tentatively, to the obsolete order Creodonta. Subsequently, it was recognised as a proboscidean. Briefly it was treated as a junior synonym of Palaeomastodon, but the two are regarded as separate genera. Though five species have been assigned to Phiomia over the years, only two, P. serridens (the type species) and P. major, are currently recognised.

Phiomia was fairly small in terms of elephant body size, with an estimated shoulder height of 135 cm (4 ft 5 in) to 170 cm (5 ft 7 in) in the case of P. serridens. In some regards it resembled Palaeomastodon, though was less basal and bore similarities to gomphotheres, to the point where it was briefly considered their ancestor. A retracted naris (nasal cavity) with strong muscle attachment sites, long snout and protruding mandible all suggest that Phiomia was among the first proboscideans to possess a true trunk. Both the upper jaw and mandibles were tusked, with those of the upper jaw being thin, recurved and blade-like, while those of the mandibles were flat, straight and broad.

== Taxonomy ==
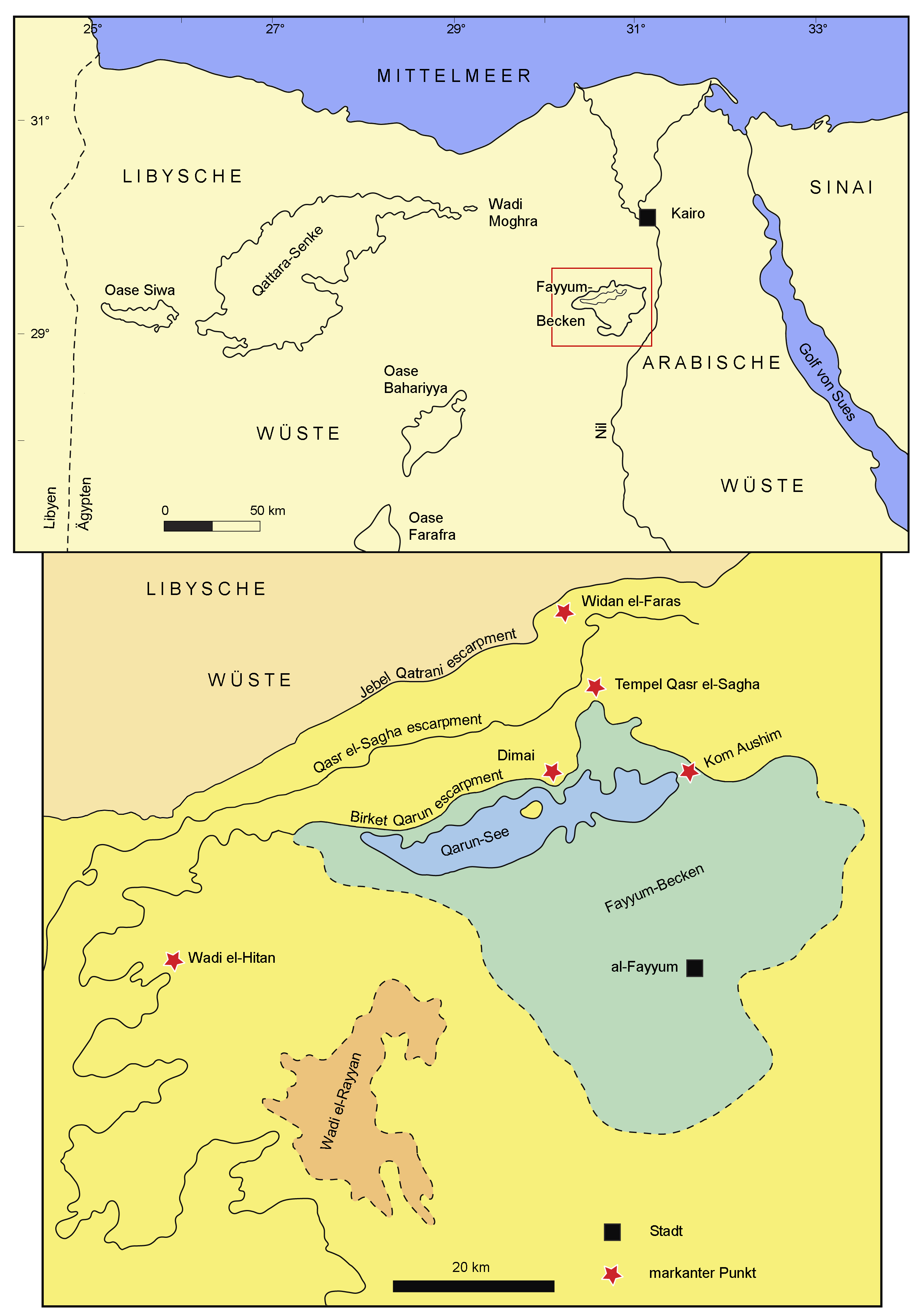
Map of the Fayum area of Egypt, from which Phiomia serridens is known

=== Early history ===
The type specimen of Phiomia, a partial left mandible (lower jaw), was recovered from strata belonging to the Jebel Qatrani Formation, part of the Eocene-age Fayum fossil deposits of Egypt. In 1902, the mandible was described by Charles William Andrews and Hugh John Llewellyn Beadnell, as part of a paper naming several mammal genera from the Fayum. They assigned to it the binomial name of Phiomia serridens, after the locality of its discovery (the name "Fayum" derives from the Greek phiom, meaning "lake") and its serrated lower incisors. Andrews and Beadnell were uncertain of Phiomia's relationships, though, believing it to have been carnivorous, tentatively suggested that it was a highly specialised member of the now-disused order Creodonta. Following a review by Max Schlosser, in 1906, Andrews re-examined P. serridens, and suggested a closer relationship to Palaeomastodon, an early proboscidean. He tentatively suggested that it may have represented a smaller species of that genus, or that it belonged, at the very least, to the same family, Palaeomastodontidae. In 1908, Andrews wrote a paper on Palaeomastodon. By that point, he had become unconvinced that Phiomia could be reliably separated from it, and suggested due to its small body size that its holotype belonged to the same taxon as Palaeomastodon minor. Thus, he formally synonymised the two.

=== Validity and internal systematics ===
The proposed synonymy between Phiomia and Palaeomastodon lasted only fourteen years. In 1922, Matsumoto Hikoshichirō once again separated the two, based on various characteristics of the skull and teeth. Notably, the morphology of the two genera's cheek teeth (the premolars and molars) were different, with those of Palaeomastodon being bunolophodont (having inner cusps that are blunt cones, and outer cusps modified into ridges) and those of Phiomia being conventionally bunodont. Furthermore, based on a second mandible from the Jebel Qatrani, Matsumoto described a second Phiomia species, P. osborni, and reassigned two species of Palaeomastodon, thus adding P. minor and P. wintoni to Phiomia. An additional Phiomia species, P. major, was described in 2004 by William J. Sanders, John Kappelman, and D. Tab Rasmussen, based on teeth from the Chilga district of Ethiopia. In the paper describing it, the authors synonymised all of Matsumoto's taxa with P. serridens, thus reducing Phiomia to just two species. Subsequent authors have maintained this synonymy.

=== Classification ===
Since its reclassification as a proboscidean, Phiomia has always been regarded as a fairly basal member of the order. Henry Fairfield Osborn believed that it was an early member of a long-jawed mastodont lineage, and that it was directly ancestral to Trilophodon (now a synonym of Gomphotherium). In Pascal Tassy's 1988 paper on the phylogeny of proboscideans, wherein he erected the suborder Elephantiformes, he classified Phiomia as a basal member of the group, intermediate between Palaeomastodon and the later Hemimastodon. In 1992, the family Phiomiidae was erected to encompass Phiomia. A phylogenetic analysis of basal proboscideans was performed by Lionel Hautier and colleagues in 2021, which recovered Phiomia in a similar position.

Below is a cladogram depicting the results of Hautier and colleagues:

- Proboscidea
  - Eritherium
  - - Phosphatherium
    - - Daouitherium
      - - Numidotherium
        - - Barytherium
          - - Arcanotherium
            - - Omanitherium
              - - Saloumia
                - Moeritherium
                - - Deinotheriidae
                  - Elephantiformes
                    - Dagbatitherium
                    - - Palaeomastodon
                      - - Phiomia
                        - Elephantimorpha

== Description ==
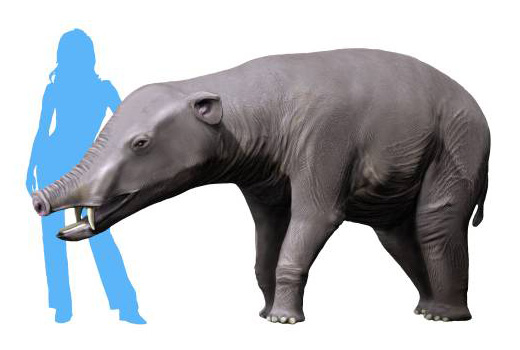
Size comparison between Phiomia serridens and a human

Phiomia serridens is estimated to have had a shoulder height of 170 cm (5.6 ft), and has been estimated to have weighed roughly 1,200 kg (2,600 lb). P. major appears to have been larger, and was estimated by Asier Larramendi and Marco P. Ferretti as likely standing 200 cm (6.6 ft) at the shoulder and weighing 2,000 kg (4,400 lb). However, given that P. major is known solely from teeth, the exact difference in size between it and P. serridens is uncertain.

=== Skull and dentition ===
The skull of Phiomia is similar to that of Palaeomastodon. It was fairly long in comparison to its width, more so than in that genus, though not to the extent of gomphotheres like Gomphotherium and Megabelodon. The naris (nasal cavity) was retracted, to the extent where its topped just before the orbits. That it is surrounded by strong muscle attachment sites suggests the presence of a small trunk. Phiomia's palate was fairly narrow, while that of Palaeomastodon was wider. The symphysis of the mandible was very elongated, though again, not to the extent of the aforementioned gomphotheres; both genera were among the first proboscideans to meaningfully elongate the mandibular symphysis and tusks. Like Palaeomastodon, Phiomia had a high occiput with a large nuchal crest, possibly to counterbalance the weight of the tusks, elongated mandible, and trunk.

Phiomia had a dental formula of 1.0.3.31.0.2.3 × 2 = 26. (Note: 1 incisor, no canine, 3 premolars and 3 molars in each half of the upper jaw, and 2 incisors, no canines, 2 premolars and 3 molars in each half of the lower jaw, resulting in 26 teeth in total) On both the lower and upper jaws, the incisors had been modified into tusks. The upper tusks curved downwards, and were thin and blade-like, while the lower tusks were straight and flat, with rounded edges. Most of the premolars were brachydont (short-cusped), though the last premolar was like the molars in being long, narrow and bunodont. This is unlike the condition in Palaeomastodon, whose teeth were bunolophodont. All of the cheek teeth bear a trefoil cusp pattern, unlike more basal proboscideans but like gomphotheres. Phiomia's cheek teeth are also shorter than those of Palaeomastodon.

== Palaeobiology ==
=== Palaeoecology ===
Dental microwear suggests that Phiomia serridens had a diet composed primarily of terrestrial plant matter, primarily twigs and leaves with some fruits. It foraged in forests and woodlands.

== Palaeoenvironment ==
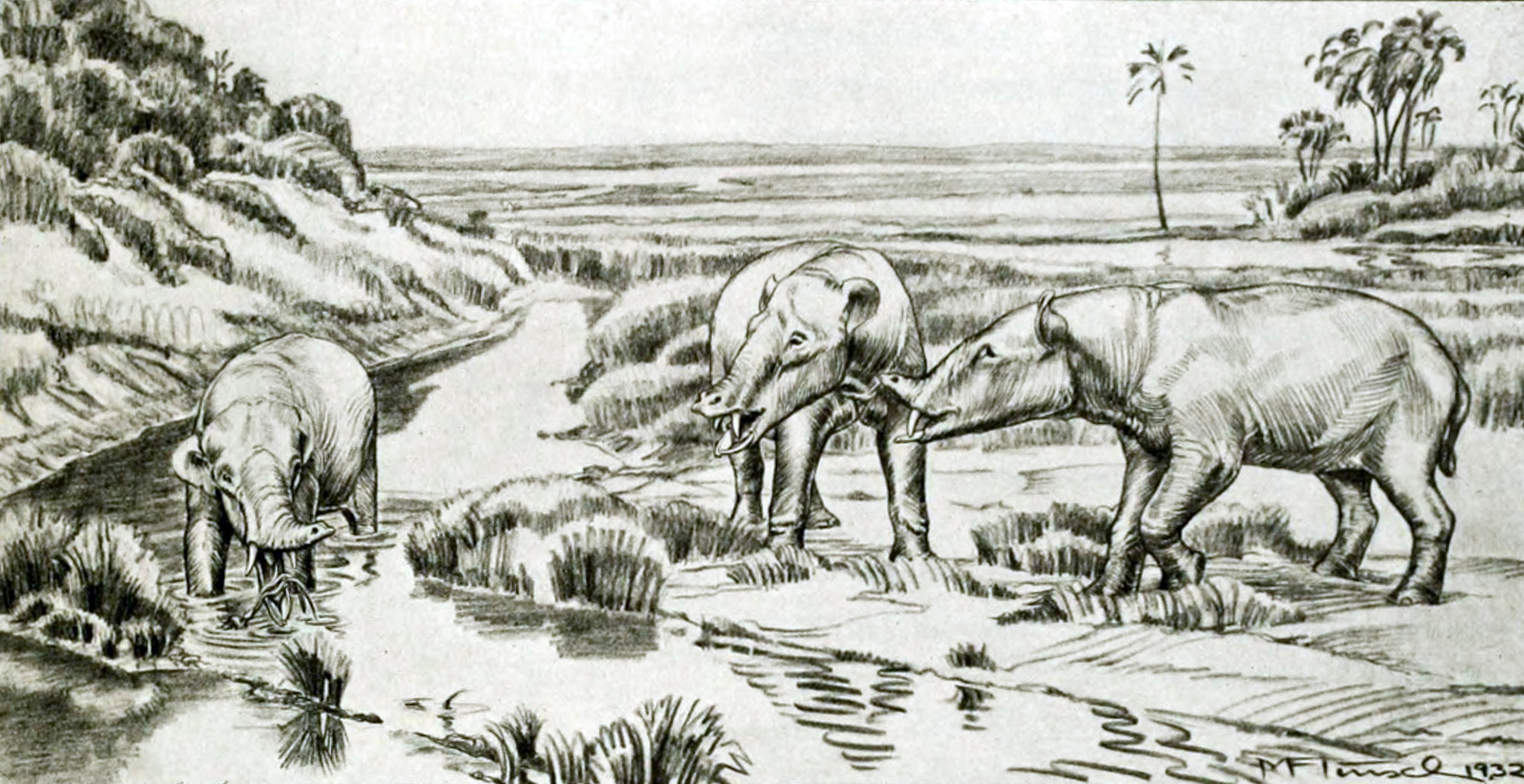
1932 depiction of Phiomia osborni foraging, by Margret Flinsch

The environment of the Jebel Qatrani Formation, from which Phiomia serridens originates, has been described as a subtropical to tropical lowland plain by Bown, who further suggests the presence of streams and ponds. Based on the occurrence of birds that are associated with water (such as ospreys, early flamingos, jacanas, herons, storks, cormorants and shoebills), Rasmussen and colleagues inferred that the environment featured slow-moving freshwater with a substantial amount of aquatic vegetation, which matches the prior hypothesis. Although lithology suggests that most fossils were deposited on sandbanks after being transported by currents, the authors argue that swamps could have easily formed along the banks of the river that was present during the Oligocene and may account for the mudstone found in certain quarries. They furthermore suggest that the fossil birds of Fayum, due to their affinities with modern groups, should be considered a more valuable indicator of the environment when compared with the fossil mammals, many of which belonged to families lacking modern examples. The absence of other birds typical for such an environment may be explained either through sampling bias or due to the fact that said groups had simply not yet been present in Oligocene Africa. Generally, Rasmussen and colleagues compare the environment of Jebel Qatrani to freshwater habitats in modern Central Africa. The discovery of snakehead fossils seem to support Rasmussen's interpretation, as the genus Parachanna today prefers slow-moving backwaters with plenty of vegetation. Other fish present meanwhile, notably Tylochromis, suggest that deep, open water was likewise present. The river channels may have been overgrown with reeds, papyrus and featured floating vegetation like water lilies and Salvinia. In a 2001 paper Rasmussen et al. argued that the sandstone and mudstone of the formation likely formed as sediments were aggraded by a system of river channels that emptied towards the west into the Tethys. Here they reconstructed the environment as a tropical lowland swamp forest intermingled with marshes. They furthermore suggest that the environment would have experienced monsoons. Overall this indicates that this region was a part of an extensive belt of tropical forest that stretched across what is now northern Africa, which would gradually give rise to open woodland and even steppe the further one was to travel inland.
