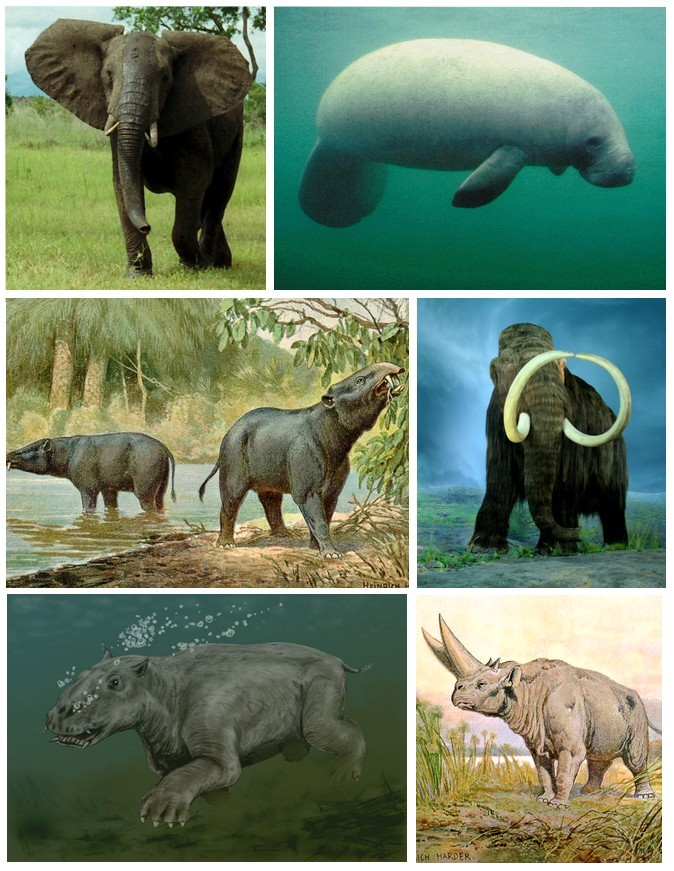
- Top: African elephant, Caribbean manatee; middle: Moeritherium, woolly mammoth; bottom: Paleoparadoxia, Arsinoitherium

Scientific classification
- Kingdom: Animalia
- Phylum: Chordata
- Class: Mammalia
- Grandorder: Paenungulata
- Mirorder: Tethytheria; McKenna 1975

Subclades and orders
- †Embrithopoda; †Desmostylia (?); Proboscidea; Sirenia
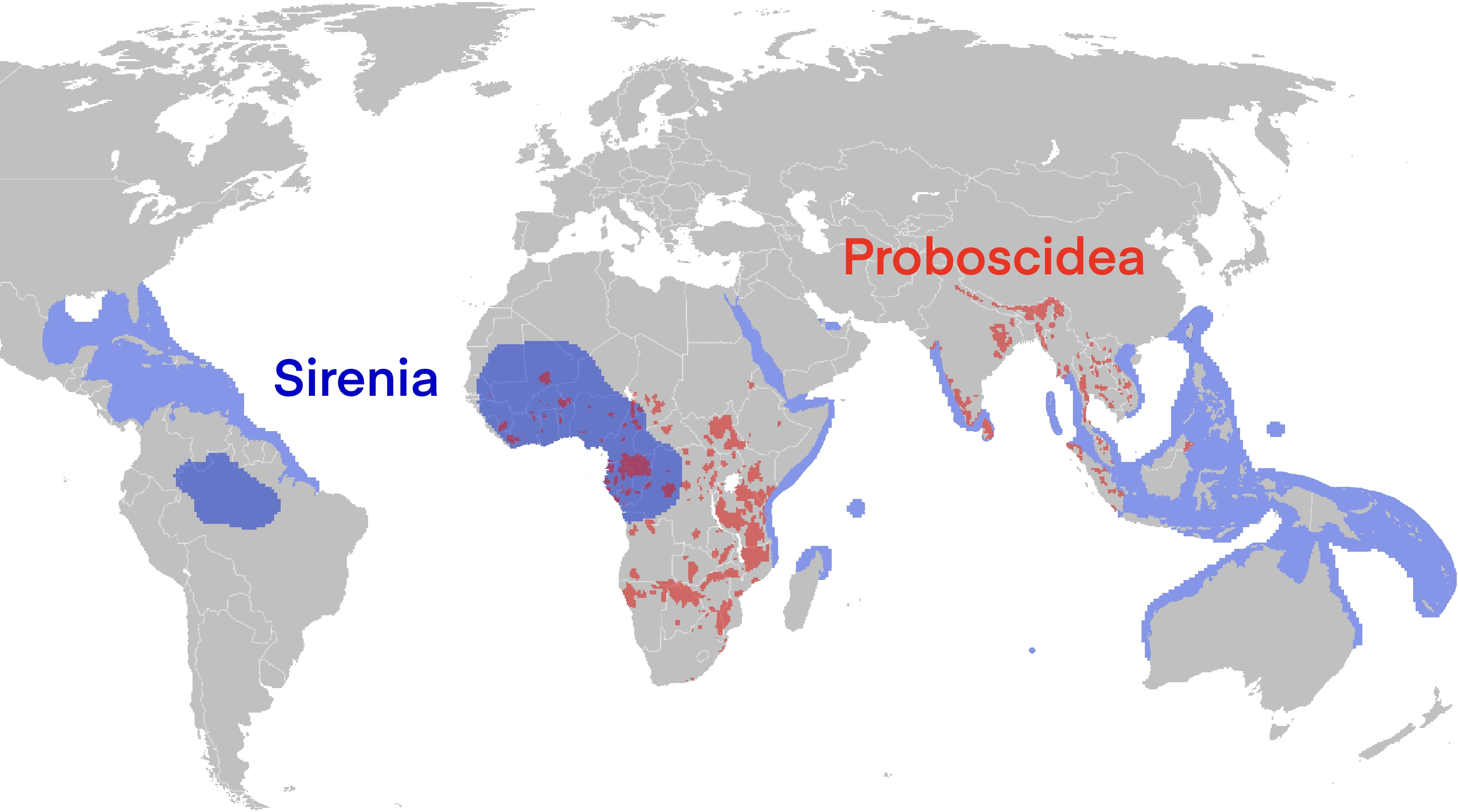

= Tethytheria =

Tethytheria Temporal range: Paleocene-Holocene

Clade of mammals

Tethytheria is a clade of paenungulate mammals that includes the sirenians, proboscideans, and the extinct order Embrithopoda.

Though there is strong anatomical and molecular support for the monophyly of Tethytheria, the interrelationships between the included taxa remain disputed. The tethytheres are united by several characters, including anteriorly facing orbits and more or less bilophodont cheek teeth (double transverse ridges on the crowns of the teeth). Proboscidea and Sirenia are linked together based on auditory characters in their petrosal bones, but this link may be a homoplasy. Desmostylians, traditionally considered tethytheres, have been tentatively assigned to Perissodactyla, along with the Early Eocene family Anthracobunidae, which was considered a sister group to Tethytheria.

== Systematics ==
Cladogram modified from Rose 2006 and Cooper et al. 2014.

- Afrotheria
  - - Paenungulata
      - Hyracoidea
      - Tethytheria
        - †Embrithopoda
        - Sirenia
        - Proboscidea
  - Afroinsectiphilia

== Classification ==
Classification modified from Rose 2006.

- Clade Tethytheria
  - order †Embrithopoda
    - †Phenacolophidae
    - †Arsinoitheriidae
  - order Sirenia
    - †Prorastomidae
    - †Protosirenidae (Dugongidae?)
    - Dugongidae
    - Trichechidae
  - order Proboscidea
    - †Phosphatheriidae (Numidotheriidae?)
    - †Numidotheriidae
    - †Moeritheriidae
    - †Barytheriidae
    - †Deinotheriidae
    - †Palaeomastodontidae
    - †Phiomiidae
    - †Hemimastodontidae
    - †Mammutidae
    - †Gomphotheriidae
    - Elephantidae
