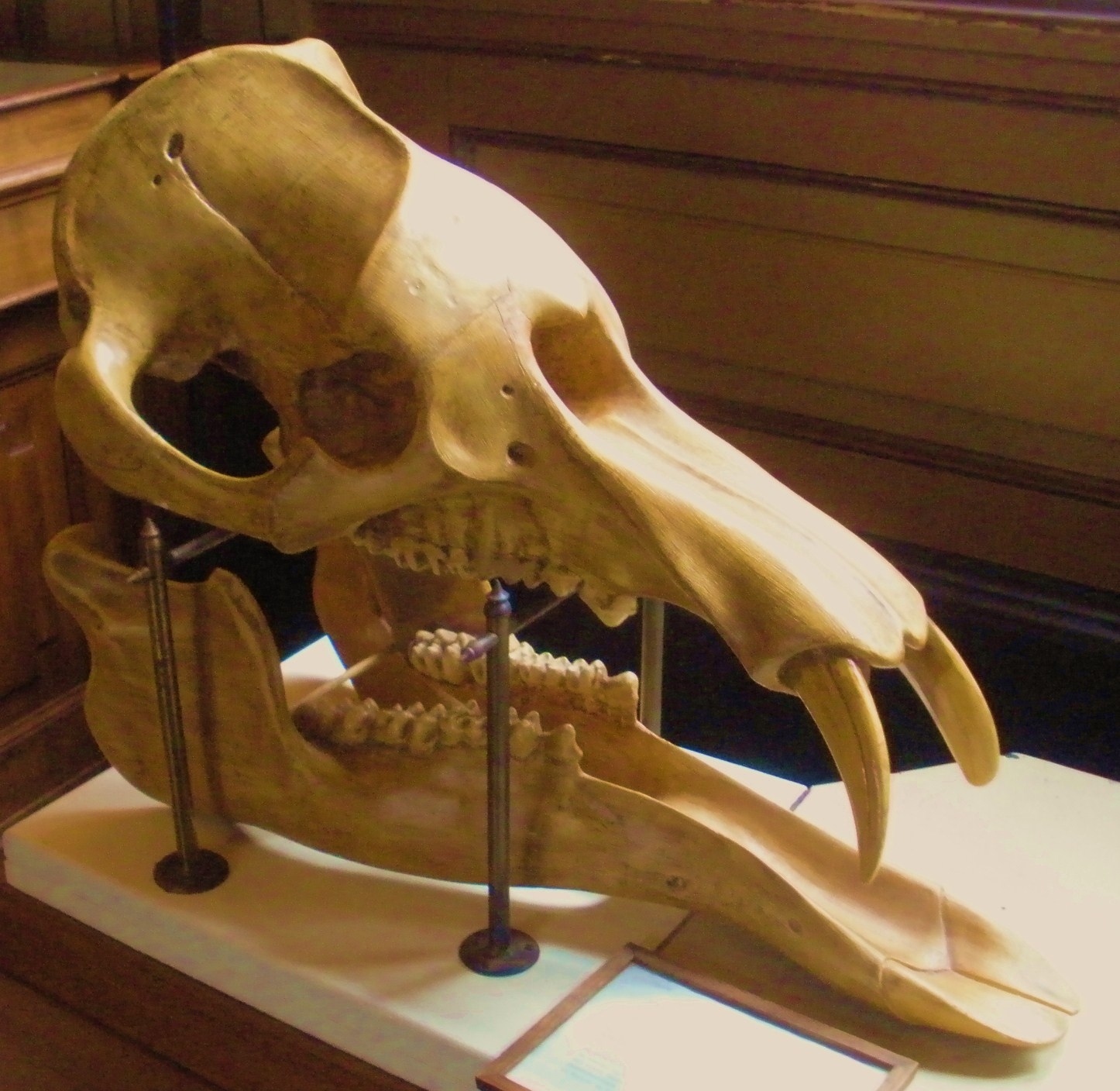
- P. beadnelli skull

Scientific classification
- Kingdom: Animalia
- Phylum: Chordata
- Class: Mammalia
- Order: Proboscidea
- Family: †Palaeomastodontidae
- Genus: †Palaeomastodon; Andrews, 1901

Type species
- †Palaeomastodon beadnelli Andrews, 1901

Synonyms
- Synonyms of P. beadnelli: †P. parvus Andrews, 1906; †P. wintoni Andrews, 1906; †P. intermedius Matsumoto, 1922

= Palaeomastodon =

Palaeomastodon Temporal range: Oligocene, 33–27 Ma

Extinct genus of proboscid

Palaeomastodon ("ancient mastodon") is an extinct genus of basal proboscideans from the Oligocene of North Africa. The first specimen discovered was recovered from strata belonging to the Fayum fossil deposits of Egypt. It was described and named in 1901 by Charles Williams Andrews, who named its type species, P. beadnelli, after a colleague. Multiple species have been named since, though have either been reassigned to Phiomia or synonymised with P. beadnelli. Three (possible) unnamed taxa are known from Ethiopia and Libya. All remains are from strata that date to 33–27 million years ago.

Palaeomastodon was fairly large for an early proboscidean. It had an estimated shoulder height of 2.2 m (7 ft 3 in), and a body mass of around 2,500 kg (5,500 lb). Similar to Phiomia, its nasal cavity was retracted and surrounded by strong muscle attachment sites, indicating that it was among the first proboscideans to possess a trunk. Like in modern elephants, the orbits (eye sockets) were positioned further back on the skull, and sat over the molars. The (lower jaw) mandible was very long, with a symphysis whose morphology suggests a long tongue was present. Like many extinct proboscideans, Palaeomastodon had two sets of tusks, one on the upper jaw and one on the lower jaws, formed from the second incisors of the maxilla and mandible respectively.

== Taxonomy ==
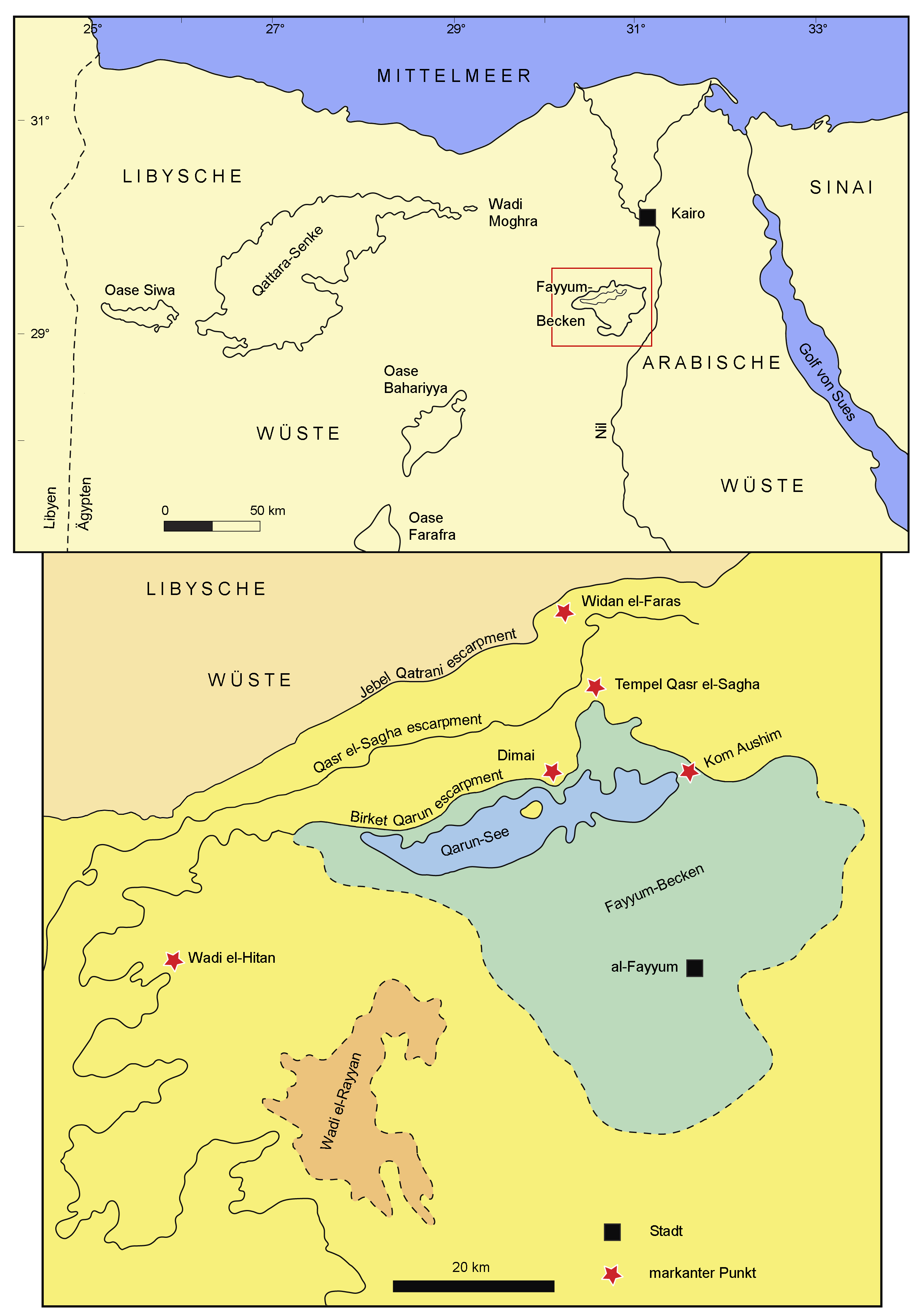
Map of the Fayum area of Egypt, from which Palaeomastodon beadnelli originates

=== Early history ===
The first specimens of Palaeomastodon were recovered from lower Oligocene strata, part of the Fayum fossil deposits of Egypt. The first specimen to be discovered, consisting of a partial mandible (lower jaw) with two premolars and three molars, was recovered from the Jebel Qatrani Formation, formerly referred to as the "fluvio-marine formation". It was described in 1901 by British palaeontologist Charles William Andrews, who named its type species, P. beadnelli, after his colleague, Hugh John Llewellyn Beadnell.

=== Other species ===
Four years after describing P. beadnelli, Andrews named two additional Palaeomastodon species: P. parvus, based on a partial right mandible, bearing premolars and molars; and P. wintoni, based on two near-complete, articulated mandibles, lacking only the angular and the anterior (front) right cheek teeth. Andrews noted a second mandible housed in Cairo, which he considered a "co-type". In a 1922 revision of the genus' taxonomy, Japanese palaeontologist Matsumoto Hikoshichirō reassigned P. minor and P. wintoni to Phiomia, a genus which had been briefly synonymised with Palaeomastodon. In addition, he described a fourth species, P. intermedius, based on a partial left mandibular ramus that bore all of the molars and parts of the last premolars. Three more specimens were also known, including a large skull fragment consisting mostly of the palate. In 2010, William J. Sanders et al. regarded all of the named species (except for P. minor, regarded as a synonym of Phiomia serridens) as junior synonyms of P. beadnelli. They did, however, note the possible presence of three species, two from Chilga, Ethiopia, and one from Zella, Libya.

=== Classification ===
Palaeomastodon is the type genus and namesake of the family Palaeomastodontidae. Though Phiomia has been occasionally assigned to the family, generally it is recovered in a different phylogenetic position, and likely belongs to a family of its own. Writing in 1926, Henry Fairfield Osborn suggested that Palaeomastodon was a direct, if remote, ancestor of gomphotheres and mammutids (which he referred to under the umbrella of "mastodonts"). In a 1988 paper discussing the taxonomy of proboscideans, Pascal Tassy suggested that Palaeomastodon fell under the suborder Elephantiformes, being phylogenetically closer to modern elephants than to taxa like Deinotherium and Moeritherium, though was still more basal than Phiomia. A 2021 phylogenetic analysis of basal proboscideans performed by Lionel Hautier and colleagues recovered similar results: Palaeomastodon was within the suborder Elephantiformes, though was basal to Phiomia and Elephantimorpha.

Below is a cladogram depicting the results of Hautier and colleagues' 2021 analysis:

- Proboscidea
  - Eritherium
  - - Phosphatherium
    - - Daouitherium
      - - Numidotherium
        - - Barytherium
          - - Arcanotherium
            - - Omanitherium
              - - Saloumia
                - Moeritherium
                - - Deinotheriidae
                  - Elephantiformes
                    - Dagbatitherium
                    - - Palaeomastodon
                      - - Phiomia
                        - Elephantimorpha

== Description ==
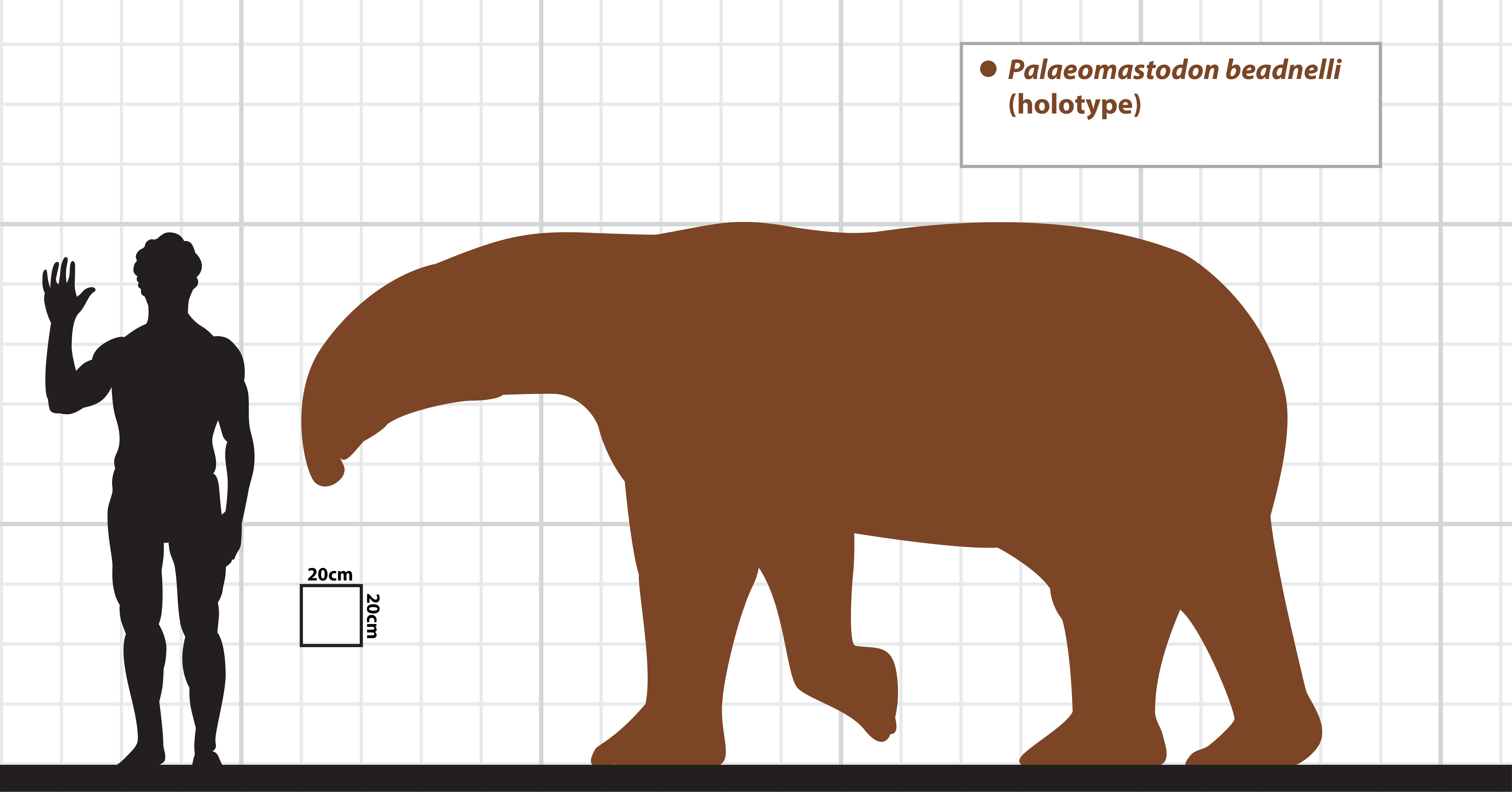
Size comparison with human

Few postcranial remains from Palaeomastodon are known. However, based on the reported 87.5 cm (34.4 in) length of one femur, a 2016 study estimated an adult shoulder height of 2.2 m (7 ft 3 in), and a body mass of over 2,500 kg (5,500 lb). A 2004 study estimated a weight of 661 kg (1,457 lb) based on a 45 cm (18 in) long femur, while another, 67 cm (26 in) long femur was estimated at 3,691 kg (8,137 lb) and a 55 cm (22 in) long ulna was estimated at 973 kg (2,145 lb). In 2026, Asier Larramendi and Marco P. Ferretti estimated that Palaeomastodon stood 220 cm (87 in) at the shoulder and weighed 2,500 kg (5,500 lb).

=== Skull and dentition ===
Palaeomastodon's skull was similar in many regards to that of Phiomia. The naris (nasal cavity) was retracted, and sat just in front of the orbits (eye sockets). Around the naris were attachment sites for strong muscles, and together, these attributes suggest the presence of a small trunk, a precursor to that seen in later proboscideans. This is contrary to Henry Fairfield Osborn's suggestion that Palaeomastodon was trunkless, and instead had a large upper lip. The orbits, too, had shifted backwards, and sat above the molars as in modern elephants. The occipital region was high and the nuchal crest was very large, possibly to counterbalance the elongated mandible, tusks, and trunk. Unlike later proboscideans, Palaeomastodon had a sagittal crest, and the braincase was small and fairly low. The mandibular symphysis is extremely elongated, with a dorsal surface that bears a deep and wide supra-symphyseal groove, indicating that Palaeomastodon possessed a long tongue.

Palaeomastodon had a dental formula of 1.0.3.31.0.2.3 × 2 = 26. (Note: 1 incisor, no canine, 3 premolars and 3 molars in each half of the upper jaw, and 2 incisors, no canines, 2 premolars and 3 molars in each half of the lower jaw, resulting in 26 teeth in total) Like Phiomia and many other extinct proboscideans, it possessed tusks on both the maxilla and the mandible. The maxillary tusks were mid-sized, slightly curved, and oriented downwards, while the mandibular tusks were broad and procumbent (protruding), and sat very close together. Behind the tusks on both upper and lower jaws was a very large diastema (gap), separating them from the cheek teeth, separating them from the cheek teeth (the premolars and molars). Palaeomastodon's cheek teeth were brachydont (possessing fairly low crowns), and lophodont, meaning that between each crown were small ridges called lophs. The premolars, relative to the molars, were fairly long. Unlike later proboscideans (though like Phiomia), the teeth erupted vertically, rather than horizontally.

== Palaeoenvironment ==
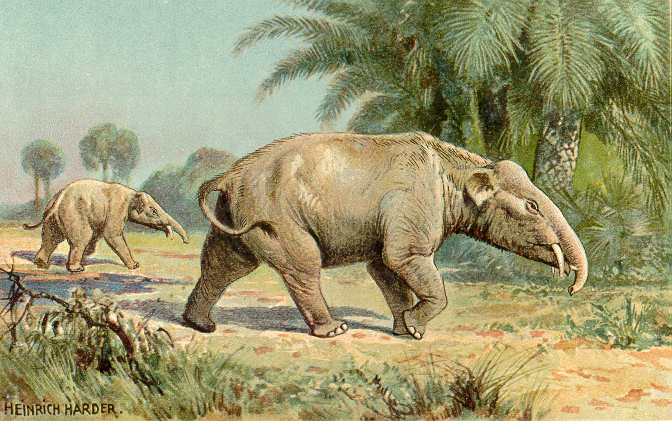
Palaeomastodon, depicted by Heinrich Harder

The environment of the Jebel Qatrani Formation, from which Palaeomastodon is known, has been described as a subtropical to tropical lowland plain by Bown, who further suggests the presence of streams and ponds. Based on the occurrence of birds that are associated with water (such as ospreys, early flamingos, jacanas, herons, storks, cormorants and shoebills), Rasmussen and colleagues inferred that the environment featured slow-moving freshwater with a substantial amount of aquatic vegetation, which matches the prior hypothesis. Although lithology suggests that most fossils were deposited on sandbanks after being transported by currents, the authors argue that swamps could have easily formed along the banks of the river that was present during the Oligocene and may account for the mudstone found in certain quarries. They furthermore suggest that the fossil birds of Fayum, due to their affinities with modern groups, should be considered a more valuable indicator of the environment when compared with the fossil mammals, many of which belonged to families lacking modern examples. The absence of other birds typical for such an environment may be explained either through sampling bias or due to the fact that said groups had simply not yet been present in Oligocene Africa. Generally, Rasmussen and colleagues compare the environment of Jebel Qatrani to freshwater habitats in modern Central Africa. The discovery of snakehead fossils seem to support Rasmussen's interpretation, as the genus Parachanna today prefers slow-moving backwaters with plenty of vegetation. Other fish present meanwhile, notably Tylochromis, suggest that deep, open water was likewise present. The river channels may have been overgrown with reeds, papyrus and featured floating vegetation like water lilies and Salvinia. In a 2001 paper Rasmussen et al. argued that the sandstone and mudstone of the formation likely formed as sediments were aggraded by a system of river channels that emptied towards the west into the Tethys. Here they reconstructed the environment as a tropical lowland swamp forest intermingled with marshes. They furthermore suggest that the environment would have experienced monsoons. Overall this indicates that this region was a part of an extensive belt of tropical forest that stretched across what is now northern Africa, which would gradually give rise to open woodland and even steppe the further one was to travel inland.

== Chronology ==
All specimens of Palaeomastodon are known from the Oligocene, between 33-27 Ma. The strata from which P. beadnelli is known have been dated to ca. 33–30 Ma. The two Ethiopian taxa, which both come from the Chilga Formation, have both been dated to 28–27 Ma. The taxon from Libya, whose stratigraphic unit is unclear, has been tentatively dated to the early Oligocene, though no specific time frame has been given.
