= Dagbatitherium =

Dagbatitherium Temporal range: Middle Eocene, 47.8–41.3 Ma

Scientific classification
- Kingdom: Animalia
- Phylum: Chordata
- Class: Mammalia
- Order: Proboscidea
- Suborder: Elephantiformes
- Genus: †Dagbatitherium; Hautier et al. 2021
- Species: †D. tassyi

Binomial name
- †Dagbatitherium tassyi Hautier et al. 2021

Extinct genus of mammals

Dagbatitherium is an extinct genus of proboscideans. So far a single molar from the phosphate basins of Togo in West Africa has been found. The fossil dates to the Middle Eocene, around 47 million years ago. A striking feature of the tooth are the three pairs of cusps oriented transversely to the longitudinal axis of the tooth. This feature is found in more derived proboscideans, which are grouped in the Elephantiformes. For its age, Dagbatitherium is the earliest elephantiform to date. Furthermore, it is characterized by a low tooth crown and a humped occlusal pattern. The genus was described in 2021.

== Discovery and naming ==
The only tooth of Dagbatitherium found so far is from West Africa and was recovered in the Hahotoé-Kpogamé phosphate complex. These are phosphate-bearing deposits formed in a coastal basin. They extend over a length of 30 to 35 km and a width of 2 to 3 km in a northeast-southwest direction between the towns of Dagbati and Aveta in Togo. First explored by drilling in the 1950s, they have been mined economically in large open-pit operations since the 1960s. This requires the removal of up to 30 m thick overlying sediments. The phosphate deposits were formed in a shallow marine environment. In principle, three units can be distinguished, consisting first of 10 to 15 m thick phosphate-bearing marks (Couche 3 and Couche 2), followed by 1 to 8 m thick phospharenites (Couche 1) and about 1 m thick phosphate-bearing clays (Couche 0). Especially the two lower depositional units are very rich in fossils, dominated by remains of sharks and rays. In the phospharenites, however, several bone deposits are also formed with, among others, fossils of whales and manatees. The tooth of Dagbatitherium was found in the basal parts of the phospharenites in the mining area of Dagbati. Numerous minerals of terrestrial origin and pollen indicate a once coastal situation. Accompanying foraminifera were also found. Based on these, an age dating to the Middle Eocene about 46.5 to 44 million years ago could be determined for the deposits. The genus name Dagbatitherium is composed of the name of the locality and the Greek word θηρίον (thērion) for "beast". Together with the genus, the species Dagbatitherium tassyi was erected. The species epithet honors the researcher Pascal Tassy, who devoted his scientific work to the study of proboscideans.

== Description ==
Dagbatitherium is the smallest and oldest representative of the Elephantiformes to date, a group of proboscideans that led to today's elephants. However, only one lower molar is currently known, possibly representing the first or second of the molar row. Its length is 37.5 mm, its width 29.2 mm. The tooth was characterized by its low (brachyodont) dental crown, which is a difference from the higher ones in other early Elephantiformes such as Phiomia or Palaeomastodon. Two distinct pairs of cusps existed on the masticatory surface, oriented transversely to the longitudinal tooth axis. The two lip-sided cusps (protoconid and hypoconid) appeared broader and lower than the tongue-sided ones (metaconid and entoconid). The respective pairs of cusps were divided by a deep pit in the central axis of the tooth. The broad lip-sided cusps caused the tooth crown wall to be more inclined, while the tongue-sided one was steeper. Sharper ridges were sometimes formed on the cusps, causing the bunodont (humped) occlusal surface pattern to tend more toward a bunolophodont (with ridges) one. In addition to the main cusps, individual secondary cusps also occurred. A third pair of cusps joined at the posterior end of the tooth. It thus gave the molar a trilophodont (with three pairs of cusps/groins) appearance. This is a typical characteristic of the Elephantiformes and separates the group from the more primitive proboscideans with bilophodont teeth (with two cusp pairs/groins). In the Deinotheriidae, which also possessed a trilophodont anterior molar, the individual cusp pairs were much more clearly fused into ridges. As another distinctive feature, the tooth in Dagbatitherium ended behind the third cusp pair in a cingulum, a low enamel bulge. In addition, it already exhibited a three-layered enamel pattern, again typical of more derived proboscideans, but absent in some earlier forms.

== Classification ==
Dagbatitherium is an extinct genus of the order Proboscidea. Its trilophodont-built molar places it in the group Elephantiformes, which unites the more modern evolutionary lineages of the proboscideans. In contrast, the Plesielephantiformes (which are paraphyletic) are the most basal representatives of the order, which are characterized by a bilophodont dental structure, i.e. they have only two pairs of cusps or ridges.

Dagbatitherium is considered to be the oldest member of the Elephantiformes known to date. Other forms like Phiomia and Palaeomastodon are much younger and were mostly described from the Late Eocene and Early Oligocene of the Fayyum. Compared to these two, Dagbatitherium was strikingly smaller, had lower tooth crowns, and a more complex enamel pattern. However, a trait that all three forms have in common is a striking bunodont (humped) occlusal surface design. The latter feature contrasts with the sometimes more distinctly lophodont teeth of earlier or contemporaneous members of the Plesielephantiformes, such as Phosphatherium, Numidotherium, or Barytherium, in which the individual cusps of a pair are connected with ridges. In dental structure, Dagbatitherium and other early elephantiforms thus more closely resemble Moeritherium and Saloumia, which form an archaic group of proboscideans that was sometimes considered a lateral branch. Further similarities are found in Eritherium, the most primitive member of the order known to date, which also possessed bunodont grinders. Altogether, however, the relationships of the early proboscideans of the Paleogene are still poorly known. Within the Elephantiformes, Dagbatitherium has not yet been assigned to a specific family.

Below is a phylogenetic tree of early Proboscidea, based on the work of Hautier and colleagues (2021).

- Proboscidea
  - Eritherium
  - - Phosphatherium
    - - Daouitherium
      - - Numidotherium
        - - Barytherium
          - - Arcanotherium
            - - Omanitherium
              - - Saloumia
                - Moeritherium
                - - Deinotheriidae
                  - Elephantiformes
                    - Elephantimorpha
                    - Dagbatitherium
