= Jeheskel Shoshani =

Israeli elephant biologist (1942–2008)

- יחזקאל שושני
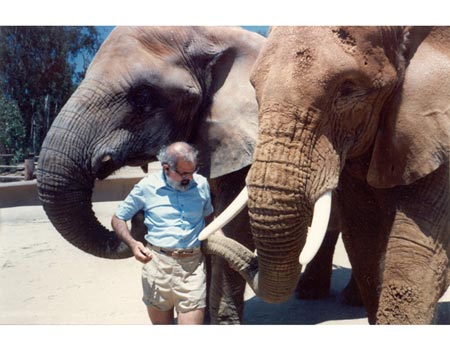
- Born: January 23, 1943; Tel Aviv, Israel
- Died: May 21, 2008 (aged 65); Addis Ababa, Ethiopia
- Other name: "Hezy" Shoshani
- Known for: Specialist in proboscidean anatomy and evolution Advocate of elephant conservation Founder of Elephant Research Foundation
- Spouse: Sandra Lash Shoshani
- Scientific career
- Institutions: Wayne State University
- Thesis: On the Phylogenetic Relationships Among Paenungulata and Within Elephantidae as Demonstrated by Molecular and Osteological Evidence (1986)

Jeheskel "Hezy" Shoshani (Hebrew: יחזקאל שושני; January 23, 1943 – May 21, 2008) was an evolutionary biologist who studied elephants and their relatives for over 35 years.

== Life and work ==
=== Early life and career ===
Shoshani was born in what is now Tel Aviv, Israel, but he held dual citizenship in the United States. His interest in elephants began in his youth after he read a Hebrew copy of Willis Lindquist's Burma Boy, which told the story of the relationship between a boy and an elephant. He began his career as a zookeeper at the Tel Aviv Zoo and became the head zookeeper in 1966. He went on to research elephants in Sri Lanka and Kenya before moving to Detroit, Michigan in 1968 and becoming an undergraduate professor at Wayne State University around 1973. Shoshani founded the Elephant Interest Group (later known as the Elephant Research Foundation) in June 1977, and was the sole editor of its official journal, Elephant (formerly Elephant Newsletter), for most of its run. He also established the Elephant Research Foundation Library, through which he collected and cataloged published and archival materials, displays, and biological samples relating to elephants. Shoshani was awarded his PhD from the university in 1986 and taught there while living with his wife Sandra and their pet rock hyrax until he moved to Eritrea in 1998. There, he studied a poorly-known population of African bush elephants that were threatened by conflicts between Eritrea and Ethiopia and taught at the University of Asmara until 2006. Concerned about the danger of the Eritrea-Ethiopia border area, he moved to Ethiopia in 2007 to continue his research, and taught at the University of Addis Ababa.

=== Research ===
During his life, Shoshani published over 168 scientific articles and books on elephants. His research focused primarily on their anatomy and taxonomy, but he also studied other taxa like primates. Notably, he led an extensive dissection of a 46-year-old female Sri Lankan elephant named Iki from 1980 to 1988, coauthored landmark papers on the elephant brain and vision, and was the editor and coauthor of two encyclopedic volumes on elephants and their relatives: the technical The Proboscidea: Evolution and Palaeoecology of Elephants and Their Relatives, and the layman-oriented Elephants: Majestic Creatures of The Wild. He was also partially or wholly responsible for naming multiple proboscidean taxa, including the suborder Plesielephantiformes, the family Numidotheriidae, and the species Eritreum melakeghebrekristosi.

== Death and legacy ==
Shoshani was among several people killed in a terrorism-linked explosion in a public minibus in downtown Addis Ababa, Ethiopia on May 21, 2008. Following his death, The Elephant Research Foundation board of directors renamed the library to The Jeheskel (Hezy) Shoshani Library Endowed Collection to commemorate his research, and it currently houses over 1,100 items. The amebelodontid Eurybelodon shoshanii was named in his honor in 2016.
