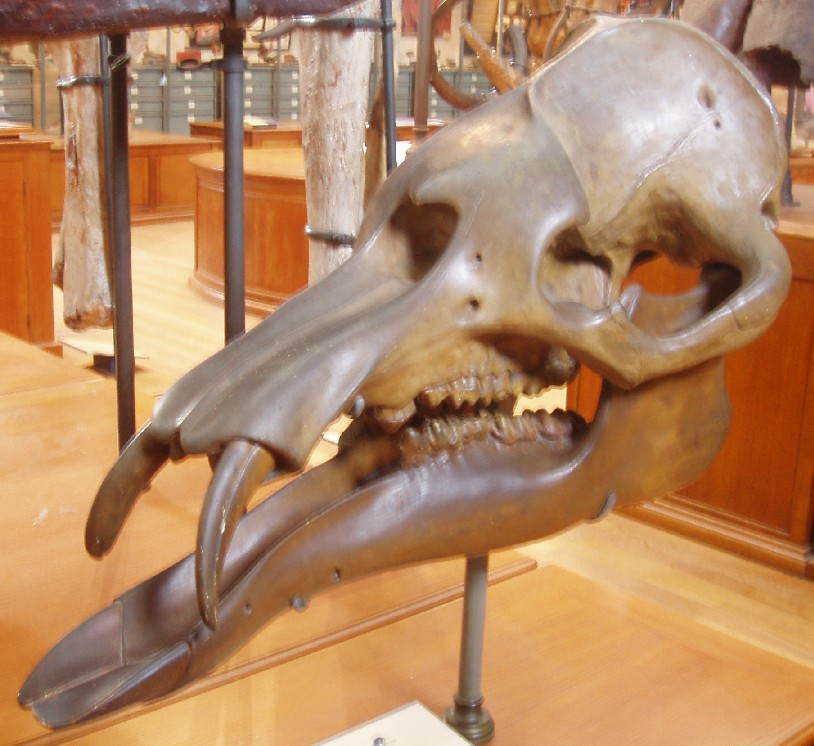
- Skull of Phiomia

Scientific classification
- Kingdom: Animalia
- Phylum: Chordata
- Class: Mammalia
- Infraclass: Placentalia
- Order: Proboscidea
- Suborder: Elephantiformes; Tassy, 1988

Subgroups
- †Dagbatitherium; †Hemimastodon; †Palaeomastodon; †Phiomia; Elephantimorpha

= Elephantiformes =

Elephantiformes Temporal range: Lutetian–Recent

Suborder of mammals

Elephantiformes is a suborder within the order Proboscidea. Members of this group are primitively characterised by the possession of upper tusks, an elongated mandibular symphysis (the frontmost part of the lower jaw) and lower tusks, and the retraction of the facial region of the skull indicative of the development of a trunk. The earliest known member of the group, Dagbatitherium is known from the Eocene (Lutetian) of Togo, which is only known from isolated teeth, while other primitive elephantiforms like Phiomia and Palaeomastodon are known from the Early Oligocene onwards. Phiomia and Palaeomastodon are often collectively referred to as "palaeomastodonts" and assigned to the family Palaeomastodontidae. Most diversity of the group is placed in the subclade Elephantimorpha, which includes mastodons (family Mammutidae), as well as modern elephants and gomphotheres (Elephantida), which are distinguished from more primitive elephantiforms by the development of horizontal tooth replacement. It is disputed as to whether Phiomia is closely related to both Mammutidae and Elephantida with Palaeomastodon being more basal, or if Palaeomastodon is closely related to Mammutidae and Phiomia more closely related to Elephantida.

Phylogeny of Proboscidea including Elephantiformes, following Hautier et al. 2021

- Proboscidea
  - Eritherium
  - - Phosphatherium
    - - Daouitherium
      - - Numidotherium
        - - Barytherium
          - - Arcanotherium
            - - Omanitherium
              - - Saloumia
                - Moeritherium
                - - Deinotheriidae
                  - Elephantiformes
                    - Dagbatitherium
                    - - Palaeomastodon
                      - - Phiomia
                        - Elephantimorpha
