= Elephant Research Foundation =

Former nonprofit organization

- Location: Department of Biological Sciences, Wayne State University, Detroit, Michigan, United States
- Project coordinator: Jeheskel Shoshani
- Duration: 1977 – 2017

Elephant Research Foundation, first known as Elephant Interest Group, was a non-profit organization established by evolutionary biologist and elephant specialist Professor Jeheskel Shoshani in 1977, and closed down in 2017.
