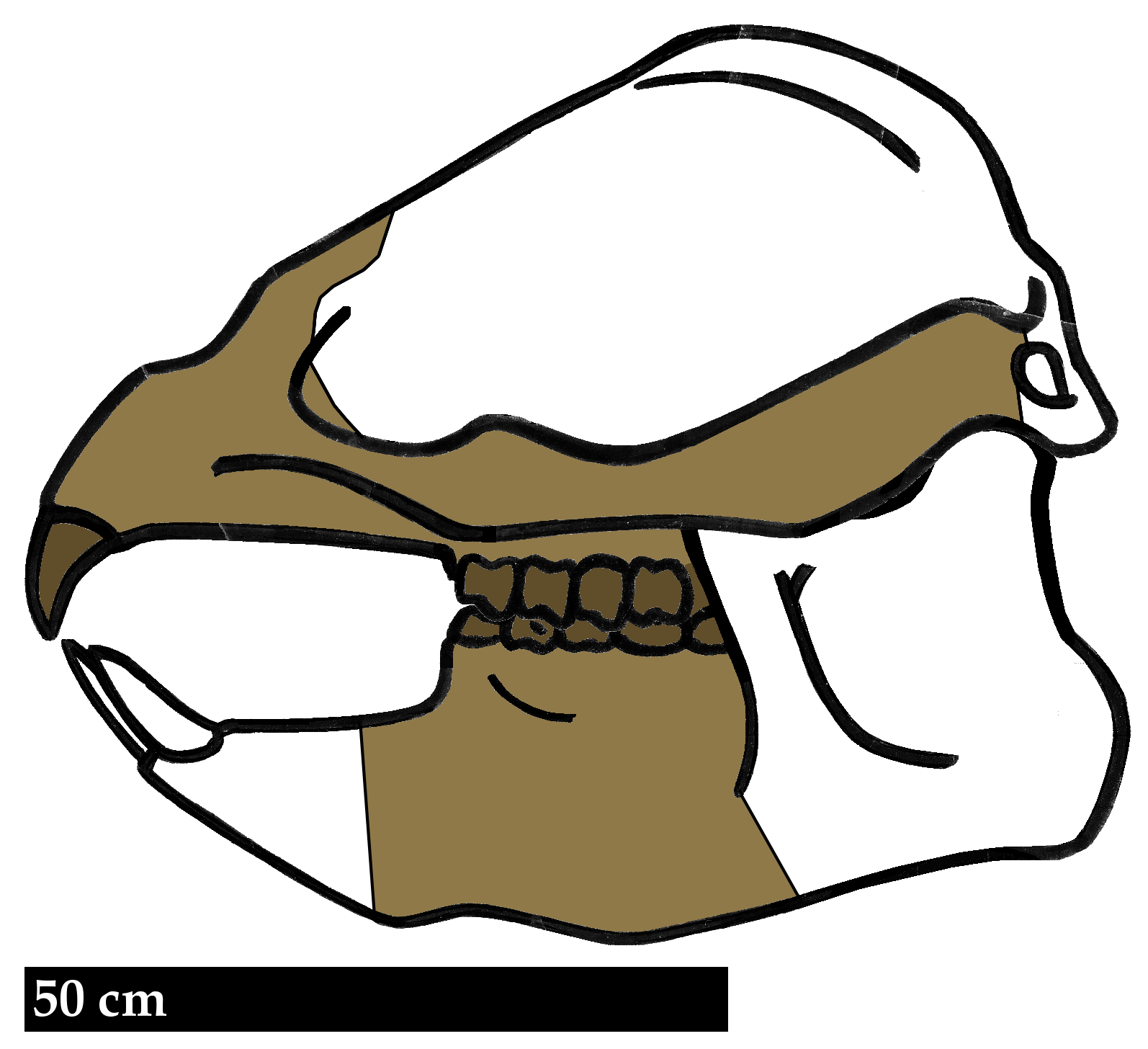
- Skull drawing

Scientific classification
- Kingdom: Animalia
- Phylum: Chordata
- Class: Mammalia
- Infraclass: Placentalia
- Order: Proboscidea
- Family: †Barytheriidae
- Genus: †Barytherium; C.W. Andrews, 1901

Type species
- †Barytherium grave C.W. Andrews, 1901

Species
- †B. grave; †B. omansi

= Barytherium =

Barytherium Temporal range: Late Eocene-Early Oligocene 37–33 Ma

Extinct genus of proboscid

Barytherium (meaning "heavy beast") is a genus of an extinct genus of large primitive proboscideans that lived during the late Eocene and early Oligocene in North Africa. The type species is Barytherium grave, found at the beginning of the 20th century in Fayum, Egypt. Since then, more complete specimens have been found at Dor el Talha, Libya. More fossils were also discovered in 2011 in the Aidum area in Dhofar by Oman's Ministry of Heritage and Culture, which was named Barytherium omansi.

== Description ==
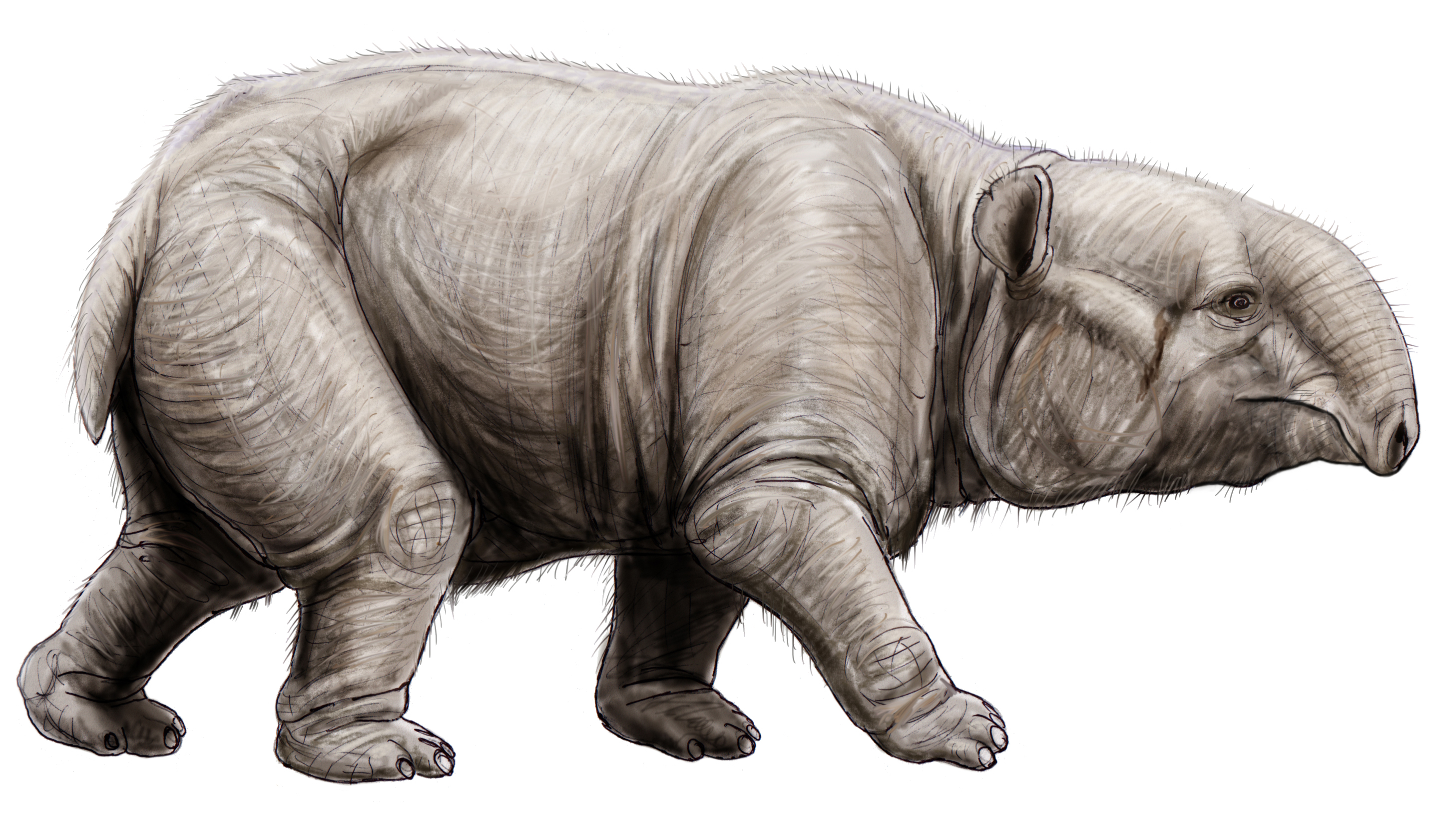
Life restoration.

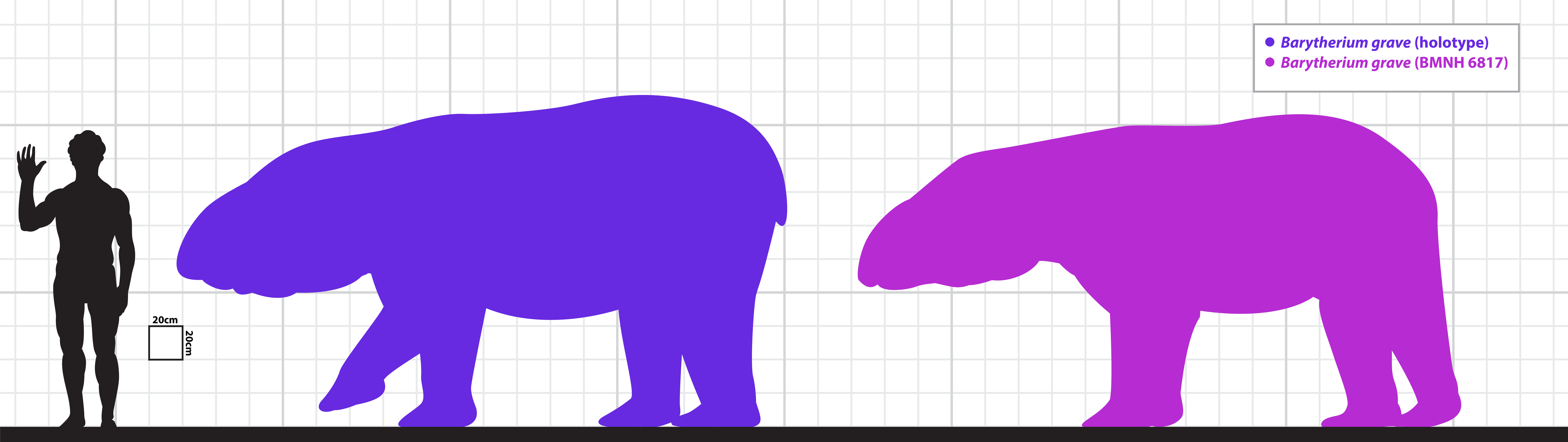
Barytherium specimens compared to a human

The barytheriids were the first large proboscideans to appear in the fossil records. Barytherium itself stood about 1.8–2.0 m (5 ft 11 in – 6 ft 7 in) tall at the shoulder and weighed around 2 t (4,400 lb). Barytherium spp. had eight very short tusks, four each in the upper and lower jaws, which resembled those of a modern hippopotamus more than an elephant. The upper pairs were vertical, while the lower pairs projected forwards from the mouth horizontally. Together, these would have created a shearing action for cropping plants.

The elevated nasal region of Barytherium suggests it had a well developed snout or a tapir-like proboscis.

== Taxonomy ==
A cladogram of Proboscidea based on the phylogenetic analysis of Hautier et al. 2021 is below:

- Proboscidea
  - Eritherium
  - - Phosphatherium
    - - Daouitherium
      - - Numidotherium
        - - Barytherium
          - - Arcanotherium
            - - Omanitherium
              - - Saloumia
                - Moeritherium
                - - Deinotheriidae
                  - Elephantiformes
                    - Dagbatitherium
                    - - Palaeomastodon
                      - - Phiomia
                        - Elephantimorpha

== Palaeoecology ==
Tooth enamel δ^{18}O values from Barytherium show that it lived a semiaquatic lifestyle. Its δ^{13}C values indicate consumption of aquatic vegetation.
