= Grand Daoui =

Fossil site in Morocco

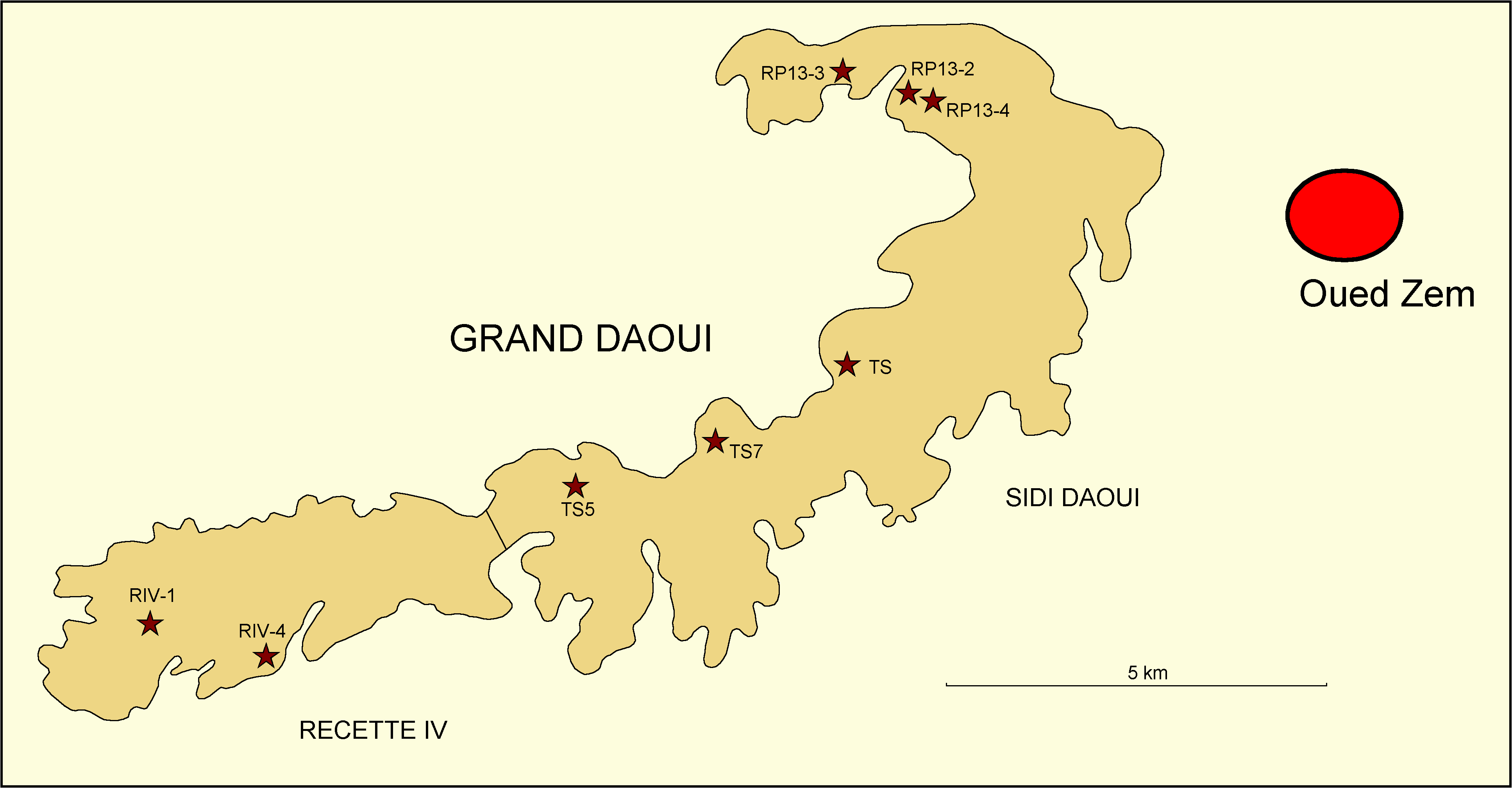
Mammal fossil sites at Grand Daoui

Grand Daoui is a quarry in the Ouled Abdoun Basin of Morocco known for its fossils. It is the discovery place of Phosphatherium escuilliei, the earliest known proboscidean. It was the location for several field parties between 1997 and 2001, which allowed survey of the geological and paleontological context of Phosphatherium localities. It is also rich in marine vertebrae fossils. All Phosphatherium remains to date have been found in the quarry. The discovery of fossils there has aided in the study of early African placental fauna. The marine snake Palaeophis maghrebianus is also known from the locality, as well as the primitive gavialoid Argochampsa krebsi.
