= Omanitherium =

Omanitherium Temporal range: Early Oligocene

Scientific classification
- Kingdom: Animalia
- Phylum: Chordata
- Class: Mammalia
- Infraclass: Placentalia
- Order: Proboscidea
- Family: †Barytheriidae
- Genus: †Omanitherium; Seiffert et al., 2012
- Species: †O. dhofarensis

Binomial name
- †Omanitherium dhofarensis Seiffert et al., 2012

Extinct genus of proboscid

Omanitherium (meaning "Oman beast" in Ancient Greek) is an extinct genus of barytheriid proboscidean that lived during the early Oligocene in Oman. It belongs to the family Barytheriidae, which represented the first large size proboscideans to appear in the fossil record and were characterized by a strong sexual dimorphism.

The holotype SQU-290, is a partial mandible with both tooth rows, and a symphyseal fragment with erupting partial left and complete right incisors. Omanitherium was found from near the base of the Shizar Member of the Ashawq Formation, whose strata outcrops extensively north of Al-Mughsayl and Rakhyut in the Dhofar Governorate of southwestern Oman.

A cladogram of Proboscidea based on the phylogenetic analysis of Hautier et al. 2021 is below:

- Proboscidea
  - Eritherium
  - - Phosphatherium
    - - Daouitherium
      - - Numidotherium
        - - Barytherium
          - - Arcanotherium
            - - Omanitherium
              - - Saloumia
                - Moeritherium
                - - Deinotheriidae
                  - Elephantiformes
                    - Dagbatitherium
                    - - Palaeomastodon
                      - - Phiomia
                        - Elephantimorpha
