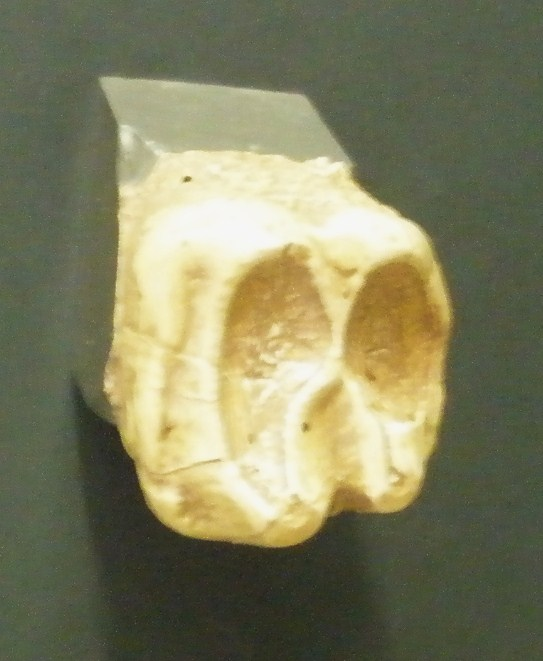
- Barytherium molar

Scientific classification
- Kingdom: Animalia
- Phylum: Chordata
- Class: Mammalia
- Order: Proboscidea
- Family: †Barytheriidae; C.W. Andrews, 1906

Genera
- †Barytherium C.W. Andrews, 1901; †Omanitherium Seiffert et al., 2012

= Barytheriidae =

Barytheriidae Temporal range: Late Eocene–Early Oligocene

Extinct family of proboscideans

Barytheriidae (meaning "heavy beasts") is an extinct family of primitive proboscideans that lived during the late Eocene and early Oligocene in North Africa and Oman. The Barytheriidae were the first large-sized proboscideans to appear in the fossil record and were characterized by a strong sexual dimorphism.
