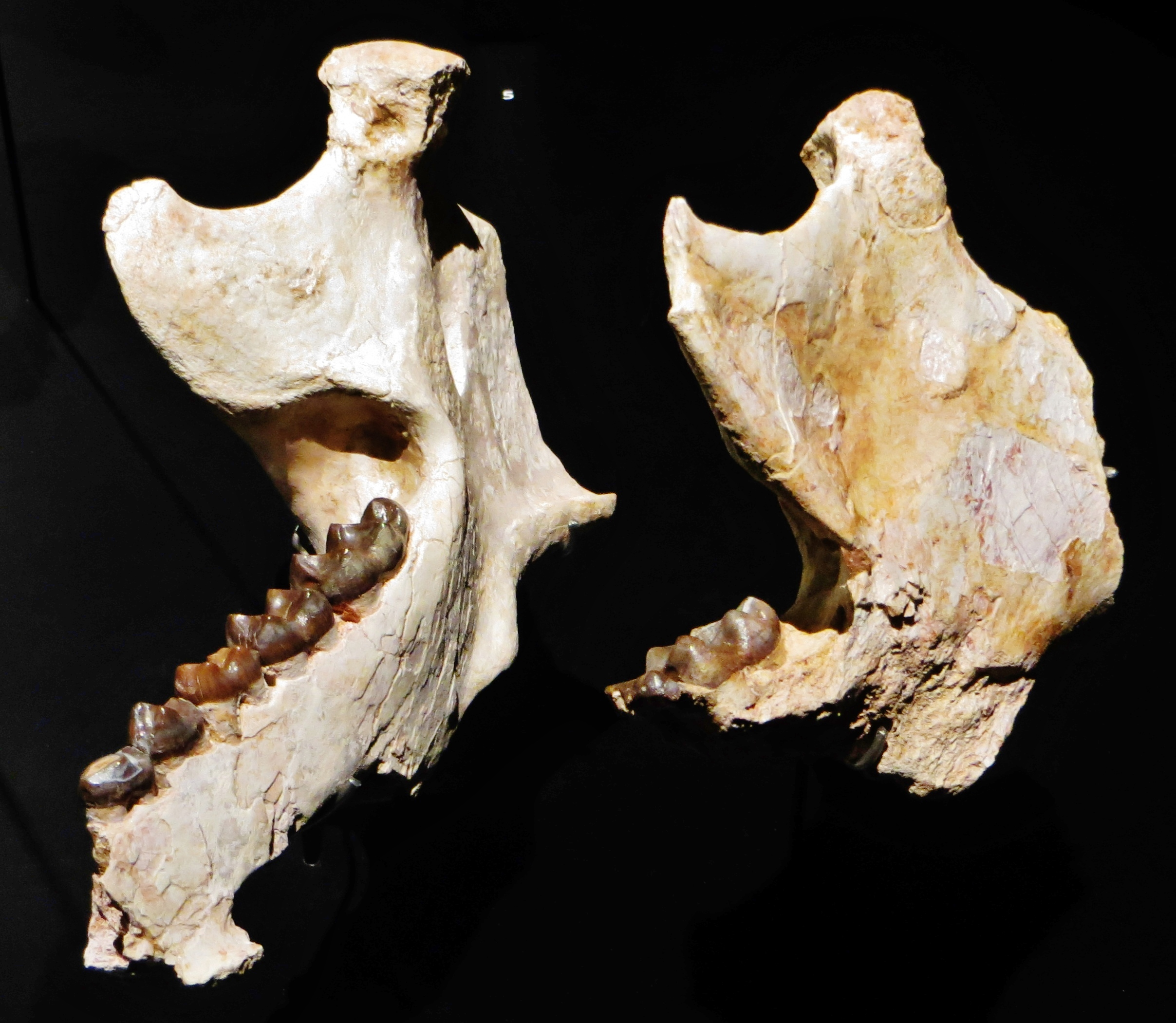
- Lower jaws

Scientific classification
- Kingdom: Animalia
- Phylum: Chordata
- Class: Mammalia
- Order: Proboscidea
- Family: †Numidotheriidae
- Genus: †Daouitherium; Gheerbrant & Sudre, 2002
- Species: †D. rebouli

Binomial name
- †Daouitherium rebouli Gheerbrant & Sudre, 2002

= Daouitherium =

Daouitherium Temporal range: Early Eocene

Extinct genus of mammals

Daouitherium (A) and Numidotherium (B) lower dentition Scale bars: 5 mm

Daouitherium ("Sidi Daoui beast" from the name of the site where it was discovered) is an extinct genus of early proboscideans (a group including modern elephants and their extinct relatives) that lived during the early Eocene (Ypresian stage) some 55 million years ago in North Africa.

Remains of this animal, fragments of jaws and teeth, have been found in the Ouled Abdoun Basin in Morocco. It is estimated to have weighed between 80 and 170 kg (180 and 370 lb), making it one of the earliest large mammals known from Africa and one of the oldest known proboscideans. Another estimate gives a weight of 200 kg (440 lb).

== Description ==
Daouitherium is known only from lower jaws and associated cheek teeth. It had lophodont and bilophodont molars, i.e. molars with large ridges. The second and third premolars had a notably large cusp called the hypoconid. Gheerbrant et al. described the teeth as similar to those of other early proboscideans Phosphatherium, Numidotherium, and Barytherium.

== Taxonomy ==
A cladogram of Proboscidea based on the phylogenetic analysis of Hautier et al. 2021 is below:

- Proboscidea
  - Eritherium
  - - Phosphatherium
    - - Daouitherium
      - - Numidotherium
        - - Barytherium
          - - Arcanotherium
            - - Omanitherium
              - - Saloumia
                - Moeritherium
                - - Deinotheriidae
                  - Elephantiformes
                    - Dagbatitherium
                    - - Palaeomastodon
                      - - Phiomia
                        - Elephantimorpha

== See also ==
- Fauna of Africa
