= Numidotheriidae =

Numidotheriidae Temporal range: Late Paleocene–Early Oligocene

Scientific classification
- Domain: Eukaryota
- Kingdom: Animalia
- Phylum: Chordata
- Class: Mammalia
- Order: Proboscidea
- Suborder: †Plesielephantiformes
- Family: †Numidotheriidae; Shoshani & Tassy, 1992

Genera
- †Arcanotherium; †Daouitherium; †Numidotherium; †Phosphatherium

Extinct family of proboscideans

Numidotheriidae is an extinct family of primitive proboscideans that lived from the late Paleocene to the early Oligocene periods of North Africa.

Fragmentary fossils (mainly teeth) of the early Eocene genera, Daouitherium and Phosphatherium, have been found in the Ouled Abdun Basin, Morocco. Numidotherium is known from an almost complete skeleton from late early Eocene deposits in southern Algeria and Libya. Compared to modern elephants, the Numidotheriidae were quite small. Phosphatherium, for instance, was only 60 cm (24 in) long and weighed about 15 kg (33 lb). Numidotherium was about 1 m (3 ft 3 in) in length. They occupied a similar ecological niche to the modern hippopotamus and the related early proboscid Moeritherium, feeding on soft, aquatic plants in marshy environments. The Numidotheriidae are not believed to be direct ancestors of modern elephants, but a collateral branch.
