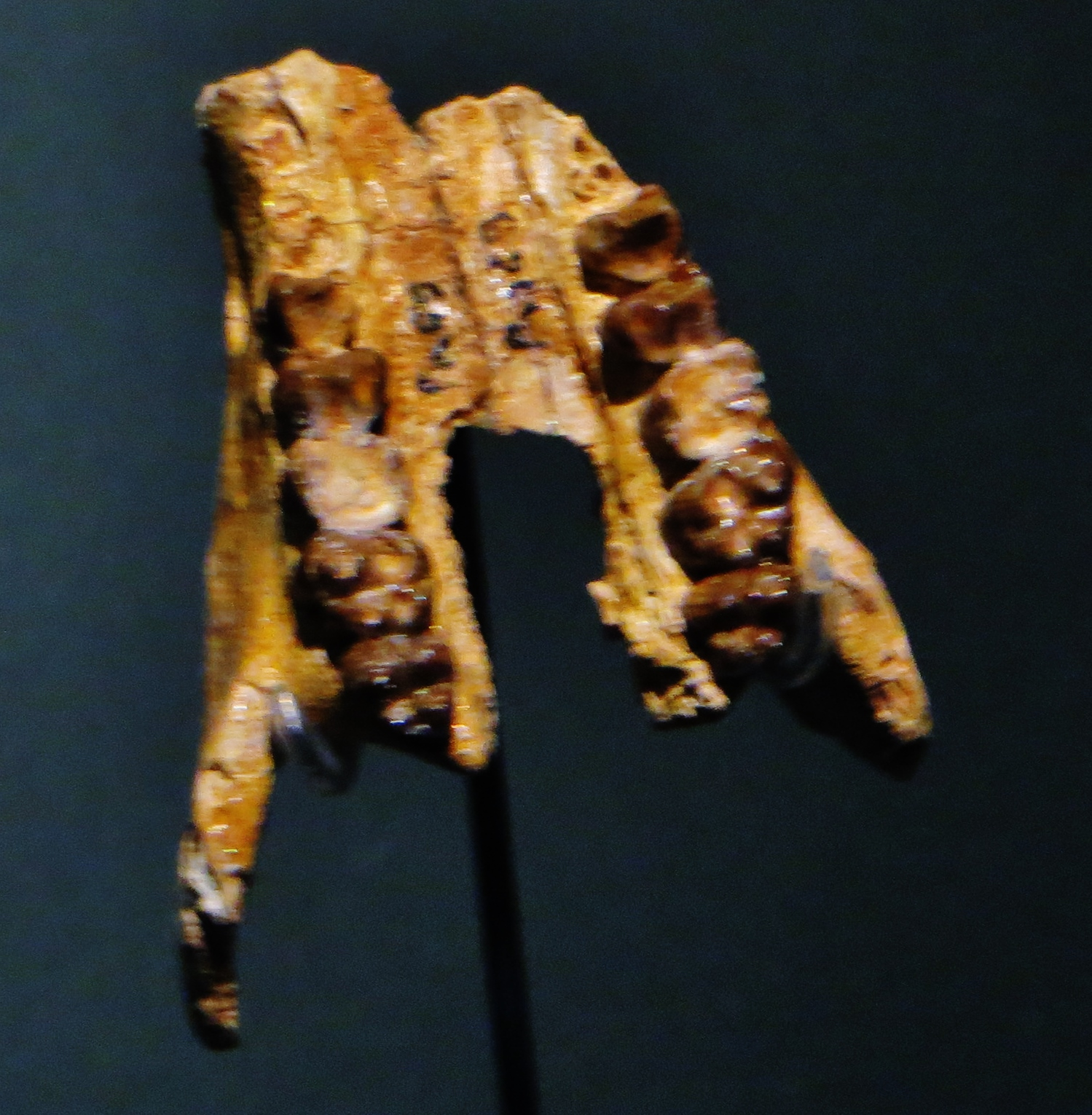
- Jaw of Eritherium azzouzorum

Scientific classification
- Kingdom: Animalia
- Phylum: Chordata
- Class: Mammalia
- Order: Proboscidea
- Genus: †Eritherium; Gheerbrant, 2009
- Species: †E. azzouzorum

Binomial name
- †Eritherium azzouzorum Gheerbrant, 2009

= Eritherium =

Eritherium Temporal range: Selandian, 60 Ma

Extinct genus of mammals

Eritherium is an extinct genus of placental mammal found in the Ouled Abdoun basin (early Thanetian age), Morocco. The type species is Eritherium azzouzorum. It lived about 60 million years ago, in the Paleocene, the oldest epoch in the Age of Mammals. At the time, Africa was an island continent. The Sidi Chennane phosphate quarries where it was found hold the oldest known placental mammals from Africa.

Alive, it would have been a herbivore about the size of a domestic cat. It was classified by its discoverer as the oldest known ancestor of elephants. More recent analysis has suggested it is more likely a stem paenungulate, an ancestor of what became the living elephants, sea cows, hyraxes, and (possibly) aardvarks, and the extinct embrithopods. If so, the genus shows a starting point in the explosive evolution of a unique fauna of African herbivores, which happened on an isolated forest continent where the ancestors of hoofed mammals were absent, just after the extinction of the non-avian dinosaurs.

== Description ==
The holotype (specimen number MNHN PM69) is now in the Musée d'histoire naturelle - Guimet in Lyon and includes an upper jaw (with approaches of the zygomatic bone and two maxillary branches), each of the two posterior premolars (P3 and 4) and three molars (M1-3)). The piece is about 6 inches long, 5 inches wide and just over 3 inches high. In addition, the fossils include 15 more objects including the skull bones (frontal and nasal bones), lower jaw fragments and teeth and the upper and lower jaw. It was about 20 cm tall at the shoulder and weighed about 5–6 kg.

Generally, Eritherium shared similarities in the structure of their teeth with other Paenungulata, such as the extinct Embrithopoda or early manatees. The dentition of the mandible that was reconstructed (from two left fragments) made up the complete sequence of teeth primitive to mammals: three incisors, one canine, four premolars, and three molars. The tooth row was closed, with no diastema between the canine tooth and the rear teeth. This primitive mammalian dentition has not been found in proboscideans.

The premolars had only one (lower jaw) or two (upper jaw) cusps. The molars were generally bunodont (i.e. with small enamel cusps on the occlusal surfaces). Bunodont teeth are characteristic of mammals that eat unspecialized soft diets, such as fruit, plant shoots, soft-bodied invertebrates, and fungi. However, there were some transverse strips of enamel on the molars. Wear-resistant enamel strips are typical of lophodont teeth, which evolve in mammals that specialize in eating abrasive plants, such as grasses. Among paenungulates, transverse lophodont teeth are found in proboscideans, sirenians, and embrithopods.

The reconstruction of the upper portion of the skull showed that the eye socket was relatively far forward in the skull. Most other early paenungulates had an orbit significantly shifted to the rear position of the skull. Another primitive characteristic is the short symphysis of the mandible. These forms are typical in primitive mammals that do not have expanded teeth or skull features to handle the stresses of specialized diets.

== Systematics ==
The great age and location of Eritherium supports the hypothesis that paenungulates originated in Africa and diversified rapidly in the Paleocene. Eritherium was originally classified as the oldest known representative of the Proboscidea, basal to all other primitive proboscideans (including Phosphatherium, Numidotherium, Moeritherium and Daouitherium)

Eritherium in cladogram after Tabuce et al., 2019:

- Proboscidea
  - Eritherium
  - - Phosphatherium
    - - Daouitherium
      - - Numidotherium
        - - - Barytherium
            - Omanitherium
          - - Arcanotherium
            - - Saloumia
              - Moeritherium
              - - Elephantiformes
                - Deinotheriidae

However, this taxonomy is only supported in analyses that put proboscideans in the same clade as embrithopods. In all other analyses, Eritherium is recovered as either a sister group to proboscideans and sirenians, or as basal to all tethytherians. In a later paper based on new discoveries of early embrithopods, the discoverer of Eritherium reports that the best available analyses using the new data all support embrithopods as the basal group. If so, proboscideans and sireneans are each other's closest relatives (the Tethytheria proper), and Eritherium is not an ancestor of elephants, but an ancestor of all tethytheres, or the earliest known paenungulate.

== History of discovery ==
The findings of Eritherium come from Sidi Chennane, quarry in Ouled Abdoun phosphate basin in Morocco. These are 10 to 20 km south of Grand Daoui, where in 1996 (Phosphatherium) and 2002 (Daouitherium) two early proboscideans were described. The Eritherium fossils were found in the "lower bone bed" of the phosphate layer. Other fossils from this layer include earliest evidence of the carnivorous Hyaenodontidae, and a diverse assortment of elasmobranchs (sharks and rays). Known dating on the elasmobranch species places the findings in a geological time ranging from 61.1 to 57.8 million years ago. Eritherium was named by Emmanuel Gheerbrant (2009). The name Eritherium comes from the Greek words ἦρι (eri, early) and θηρίον (therion, animal), while the species name azzouzorum honors the residents of the village of Ouled Azzouz, who did much of the work of excavating the fossil site.
