= Charles William Andrews =

British palaeontologist

Charles William Andrews (30 October 1866 – 25 May 1924) F.R.S., was a British palaeontologist whose career as a vertebrate paleontologist, both as a curator and in the field, was spent in the services of the British Museum, Department of Geology.

== Biography ==
Andrews was born in Hampstead, Middlesex.

A graduate of the University of London, Andrews was awarded an assistant's position at the British Museum, after a competitive exam, in 1892. His first concerns were with fossil birds, and he described Aepyornis titan, the extinct "Elephant Bird" of Madagascar (1894). He noticed the connections among widely separated flightless rails of Mauritius, the Chatham Islands and New Zealand and deduced that their flightless character had been independently evolved on the spot.

Alfred Nicholson Leeds' gifts to the British Museum of Jurassic marine reptiles from the Oxford Clay of Peterborough elicited his interest in plesiosaurs and other sea-reptiles which culminated in a catalogue of the Leeds collection at the British Museum (2 vols. 1910–13); his interest in this area did not flag afterwards: his last, posthumously-published paper concerned the skin impressions and other soft structures preserved in an ichthyosaur paddle from Leicestershire.

In 1897 he was selected to spend several months at Christmas Island in the Indian Ocean, to inspect it before the activities of phosphate mining compromised its natural history. The results were published by the British Museum in 1900.

After 1900 his health began slowly to fail and he was sent to spend winter months in Egypt; there he joined Beadnell of the Geological Survey of Egypt, inspecting fossils of freshwater fishes in the Fayoum, where Andrews noticed mammalian fauna not previously detected and published Moeritherium and an early elephant, Palaeomastodon, followed by his Descriptive Catalogue.

In 1916 he was awarded the Lyell Medal of the Geological Society. He was also an active member of the Zoological Society.

The standard author abbreviation C.W.Andrews is used to indicate this person as the author when citing a botanical name.
