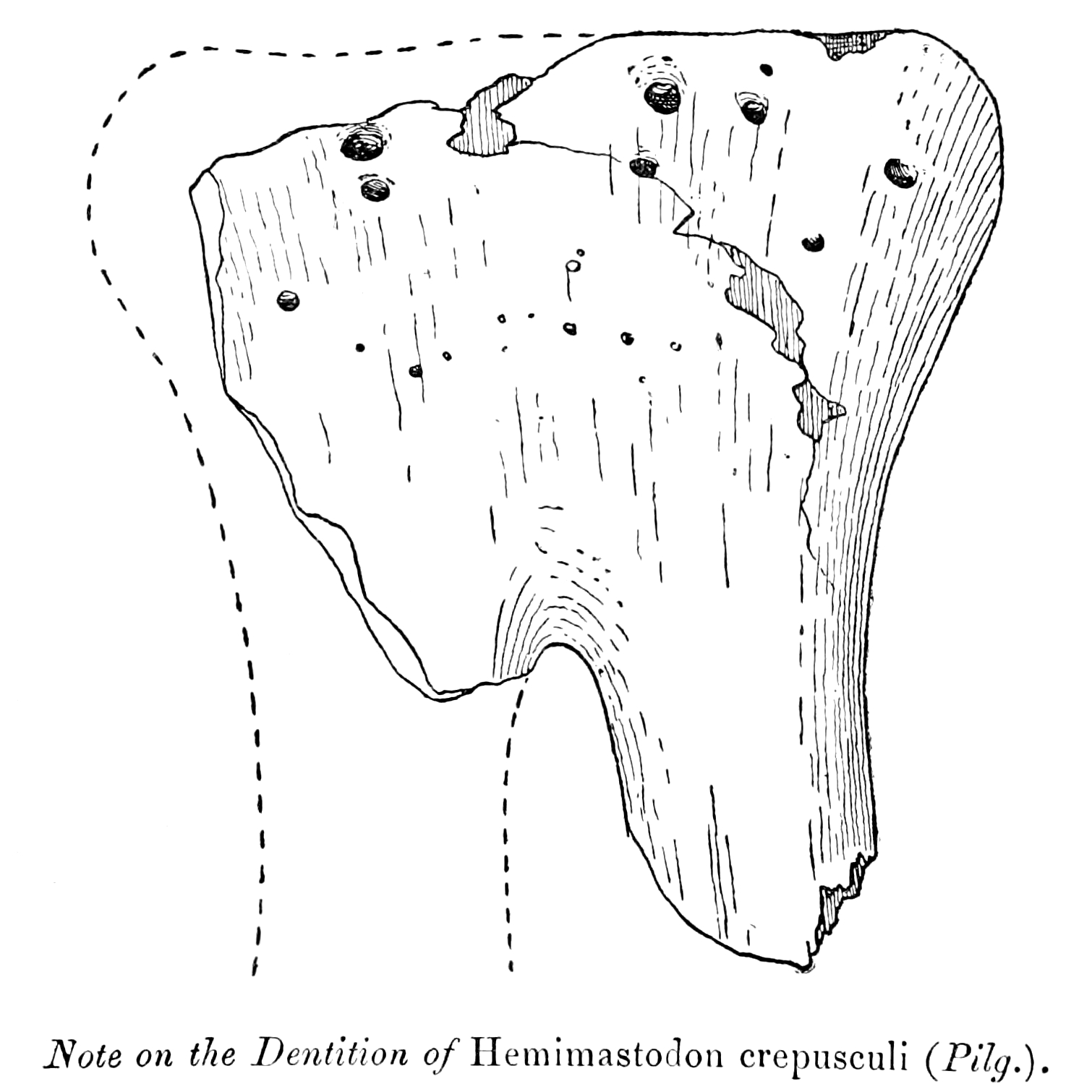
- Hemimastodon crepusculi

Scientific classification
- Kingdom: Animalia
- Phylum: Chordata
- Class: Mammalia
- Order: Proboscidea
- Suborder: Elephantiformes
- Family: †Hemimastodontidae
- Genus: †Hemimastodon

Species
- H. crepusculi (Pilgrim, 1908)

= Hemimastodon =

Hemimastodon Temporal range: Late Oligocene

Extinct genus of mammals

Hemimastodon ("half mastodont") is an extinct genus of proboscidean from the Late Oligocene deposits of the Dera Bugti Beds in Pakistan.

Its phylogenetic affinity within other proboscideans is uncertain.
