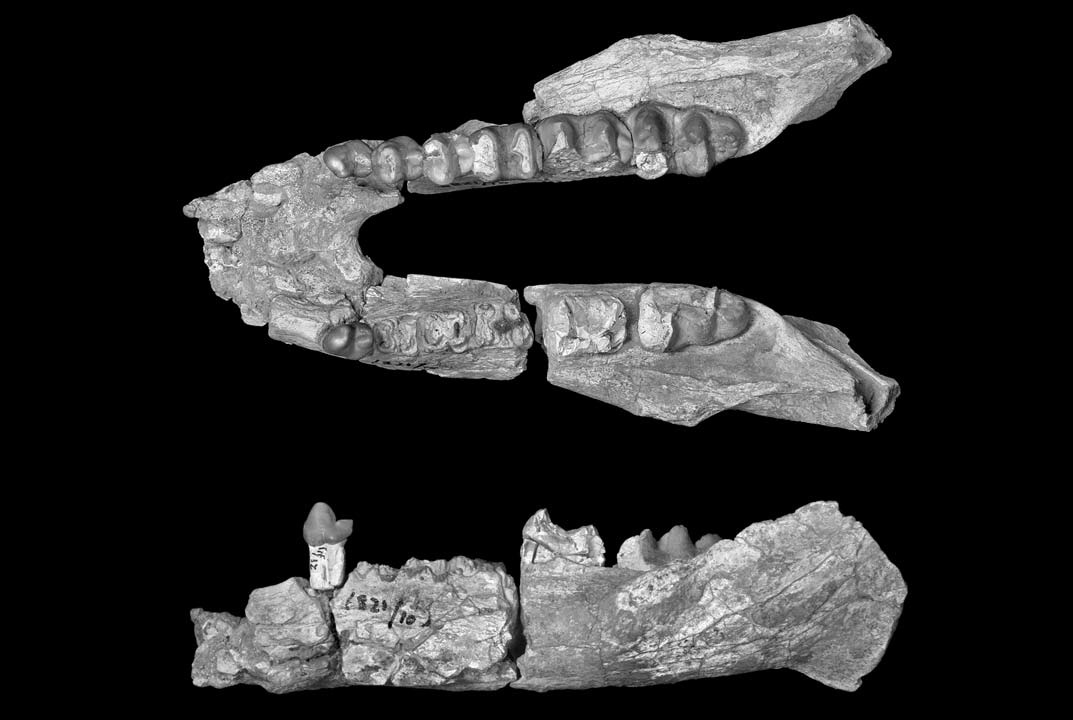
- Arcanotherium savagei mandible

Scientific classification
- Kingdom: Animalia
- Phylum: Chordata
- Class: Mammalia
- Order: Proboscidea
- Family: †Numidotheriidae
- Genus: †Arcanotherium; Delmer, 2009
- Species: †A. savagei

Binomial name
- †Arcanotherium savagei Court, 1995

= Arcanotherium =

Arcanotherium Temporal range: Late Eocene–Early Oligocene

Genus of mammals

Arcanotherium is an extinct genus of early proboscidean belonging to the family Numidotheriidae that lived in North Africa during the late Eocene/early Oligocene interval.

== Taxonomy ==
Arcanotherium was originally described by Court (1995) as a new species of Numidotherium, N. savagei, based on a mandible found in the late 1960s in late Eocene deposits at Dor el Talha, Libya. However, after the Barytherium material from Libya became accessible to paleontologists, undescribed material from the collection prompted Delmer (2009) to erect Arcanotherium for N. savagei.

== Phylogeny ==
Below is a phylogenetic tree of early Proboscidea, based on the work of Hautier et al. (2021).

- Proboscidea
  - Eritherium
  - - Phosphatherium
    - - Daouitherium
      - - Numidotherium
        - - Barytherium
          - - Arcanotherium
            - - Omanitherium
              - - Saloumia
                - Moeritherium
                - - Deinotheriidae
                  - Elephantiformes
                    - Elephantimorpha
                    - Dagbatitherium
