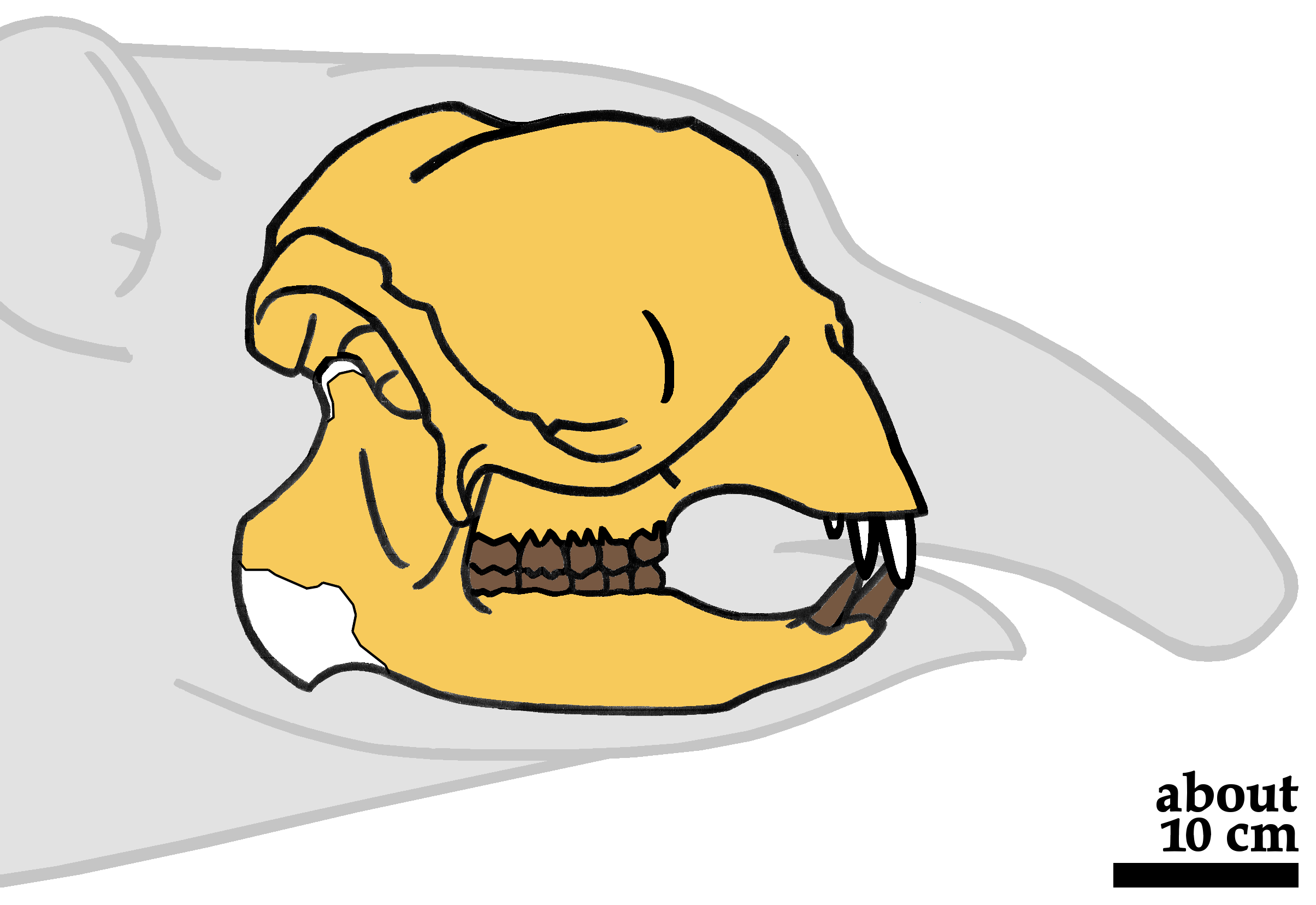
- Drawing of skull from Numidotherium with restored silhouette.

Scientific classification
- Kingdom: Animalia
- Phylum: Chordata
- Class: Mammalia
- Order: Proboscidea
- Family: †Numidotheriidae
- Genus: †Numidotherium; Jaeger, 1986
- Species: †N. koholense

Binomial name
- †Numidotherium koholense Jaeger, 1986

= Numidotherium =

Numidotherium Temporal range: Middle Eocene

Extinct genus of mammals

Numidotherium (from Numidia, and Ancient Greek θηρίον (thēríon), meaning "beast") is an extinct genus of early proboscideans, discovered in 1984, that lived during the middle Eocene of North Africa some 46 million years ago. It was about 90–100 cm (35–39 in) tall at the shoulder and weighed about 250–300 kg (550–660 lb).

The type species, N. koholense, is known from an almost complete skeleton from the site of El Kohol, southern Algeria, dating from the early/middle Eocene period. The animal had the size and the appearance of a modern tapir. In appearance, it was more slender and more plantigrade than an elephant, its closest modern relative.

Numidotherium savagei, named by Court (1995) for material from late Eocene deposits at Dor el Talha, Libya, has been reassigned to its own genus, Arcanotherium.

== Description ==
Numidotherium is one of the earliest representatives of the Proboscidea, and is known from several tooth and skull finds, and also from several postcranial fossils. It reached a shoulder height of 90 to 100 cm and was thus significantly larger than its predecessors Phosphatherium and Eritherium. Furthermore, it was characterized by a short trunk and quite long legs. The skull had a length of 37 cm and a raised cranial roof and had widely spreading zygomatic arches. Unlike modern proboscideans, Numidotherium possessed a secondary bony lamina in its inner ear. Numidotherium also had a crus commune secundaria and slender semicircular canals. As one of the earliest proboscideans, Numidotherium had air-filled bones in the roof of the skull, which, due to the increase in size and weight of the animal, offered a larger attachment point for the neck muscles. The rostrum was short and sloped steeply down from the forehead to the nose. The nasal bone was characterized by an elongated outer area of the nasal space (nares), while the intermaxillary bone was rather short and high. The shape of the rostrum created a high, but rather narrow, nasal interior. On the side of the upper jaw, a deep furrow ran from the intermaxillary bone to the anterior approach of the zygomatic arch. In some individuals the temporal ridges on the parietal bone formed a distinctive crest, in others they remained clearly separated. The occiput was also quite short in shape, with a robust occipital bulge. The joint surfaces here for articulating with the cervical spine were comparatively high.

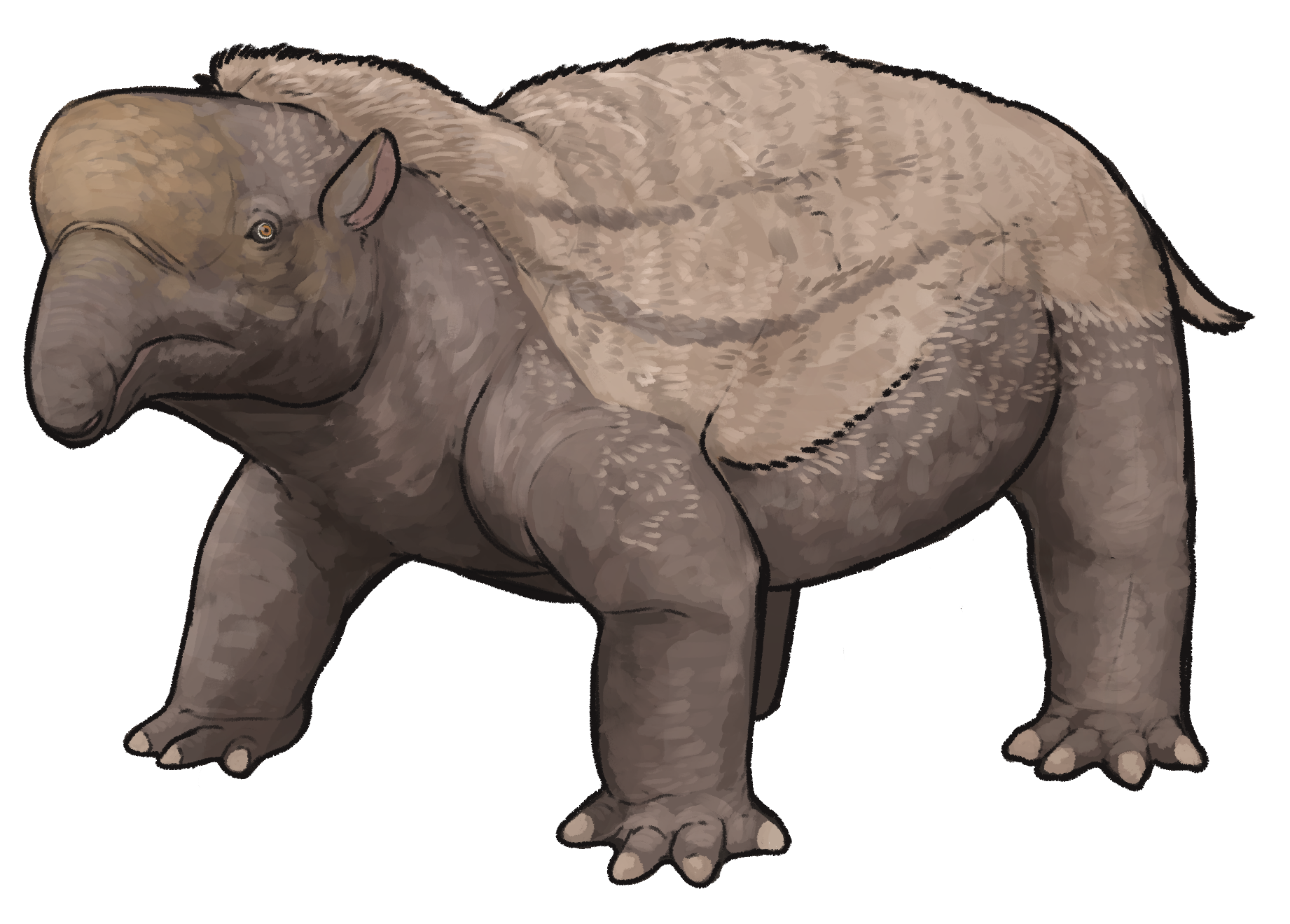
Life restoration

The lower jaw, up to 39 cm in length, was low but broad. The symphysis extended to the second premolar. The mental foramen lay below the third premolar tooth. The ascending branch loomed up and delimited a prominent masseteric fossa. The crown process was oriented slightly inwards. The number of teeth in the set of teeth was slightly reduced compared to older proboscideans. The second incisor in the upper jaw (I2) was significantly enlarged with a length of 4.5 cm and was conical in shape. Furthermore, it possessed only a thin layer of enamel. In the lower jaw, the first incisor, protruding obliquely forward (procumbent), was enlarged by 3.5 cm - the first examinations here looked at the second incisor as the enlarged one. These enlargements represent the preliminary stages of tusk formation in later proboscideans. There was a large diastema to each of the rear teeth, which could be up to 9.5 cm long. The premolars were characterized by a simple construction with a single raised enamel cusp. The molars, on the other hand, had two transversely positioned enamel ridges (bilophodont) and were reminiscent of those of tapirs. The entire posterior dentition can be described as a low crown (brachydont).

The previously known postcranial skeleton comprises individual vertebrae, especially the first and second cervical vertebrae (atlas and axis), which differ only slightly from those of other proboscideans. The humerus reached a length of 30 cm and was robustly designed. The bones of the forearm, ulna and radius reached about the same length and were fused at the lower end. The upper joint end of the ulna (olecranon) was relatively short and oriented backwards. The thigh bone measured 40.5 cm. The latter was clearly narrowed anteriorly and posteriorly, but had a very broad upper joint end and a third trochanter. The shin was significantly shorter at 26 cm. The forefoot and hindfoot had the "taxeopodous" arrangement of the root bones typical of proboscideans. That is, the individual bones of the palm and tarsal lay in rows one behind the other and not reciprocally to one another. As a result, there was no contact between the lunate bone and the hamate on the forefoot. The special arrangement of the carpal bones suggests that an os centrale was formed between the lunate, the hamate and the trapezoid bone, which should be understood as a novel feature of the Proboscidea.

== Discovery ==
Numidotherium finds come exclusively from North Africa. The first specimens were discovered in El Kohol on the southern edge of the Atlas Mountains in Algeria. They come from the third layer of the El-Kohol Formation and date to the Middle Eocene. The rather extensive finds include a skull, a lower jaw and remains of the musculoskeletal system. A much older find from the Lower Eocene is known with a lower jaw fragment from a phosphate mine near Tamaguèlelt in northern Mali. However, this belongs to a much smaller representative and may have to be assigned to a different taxon. Further dental finds were found in connection with a rich fish fauna from Ad-Dakhla in Western Sahara and can be assigned to the transition from the Middle to the Upper Eocene.

== Classification ==
Below is a phylogenetic tree of early Proboscidea, based on the work of Hautier et al. (2021).

- Proboscidea
  - Eritherium
  - - Phosphatherium
    - - Daouitherium
      - - Numidotherium
        - - Barytherium
          - - Arcanotherium
            - - Omanitherium
              - - Saloumia
                - Moeritherium
                - - Deinotheriidae
                  - Elephantiformes
                    - Elephantimorpha
                    - Dagbatitherium

== Paleobiology ==
The construction of the nasal bone with the elongated outer nasal cavities suggests the presence of a short proboscis in Numidotherium. The early proboscideans are commonly associated with a semi-aquatic way of life, as proven in the closely related Barytherium and in Moeritherium. The fused bones of the forearm support this view, but the plantigrade structure of the forefoot shows adaptations to terrestrial locomotion, just as the low position of the eyes speaks against a water-dwelling way of life. The low-crowned molars with their typical, clearly formed lophodontic chewing surfaces indicate specialization in relatively soft vegetation, which should have predominantly included leaves, fruits and twigs. The fibrous food was probably looked for on bushes at head height or just above it, characteristic grinding marks on the anterior premolars suggest that the animals wedged them in the mouth and tore them off with lateral movements of the head. Isotope analysis of the teeth confirm this assumed terrestrial way of life. In the case of Numidotherium compared to Barytherium or Moeritherium, these resulted in more fluctuating ratios of the oxygen isotope O^{18}, which in the latter two are significantly more balanced due to their semi-aquatic way of life. It is possible that an adaptation to life in a semiaquatic environment occurred several times within the Proboscidea, whereby the question remains unanswered as to whether the proboscis, including today's elephants, actually descended from some water-dwelling ancestors.

The traditional postcranial skeleton of Numidotherium allows conclusions to be drawn concerning its locomotion. Due to the arrangement of individual joint surfaces in the shoulder and pelvic area and the fused bones of the forearm, slightly bowed limbs can be assumed. The bones of the front and rear feet are also more horizontally oriented, which is suggested by the structure of the ankle bone with a forward-facing joint head. The joint facets of the foot bones, which are sometimes clearly positioned to the side, indicate that the individual bones (metapodia and phalanges) were rather spread apart. All in all, it can be assumed that Numidotherium has a sole passage. This is in clear contrast to today's elephants, which have column-like limbs arranged under the body, which can carry the heavy weight. The front and rear feet, with their more vertical structure, show a semi-plantigrade posture (which, however, is again supported by the foot pad).

The cochlea of Numidotherium, which is built somewhat differently than that of today's elephants, turned out to be a further specialty. In Numidotherium, for example, this has one and a half turns, whereas in elephants it has two. In the basal area of the winding, there are deviations in detail, for example in the clear formation of the lamina spiralis secundaria, which is responsible, among other things, for the perception of certain frequencies. Researchers therefore suspect that Numidotherium was more likely to perceive sounds in the higher frequency range, in contrast to today's elephants, which can also communicate in infrasound. The lower number of coils of the cochlea in Numidotherium also suggests a more limited auditory perception. The low frequency limit for the range of frequencies Numidotherium was able to hear was between 450.3 Hz and 266.1 Hz.
