= Saloumia =

Saloumia Temporal range: Lutetian

Scientific classification
- Domain: Eukaryota
- Kingdom: Animalia
- Phylum: Chordata
- Class: Mammalia
- Order: Proboscidea
- Genus: †Saloumia; Tabuce et al., 2020
- Species: †S. gorodiskii

Binomial name
- †Saloumia gorodiskii Tabuce et al., 2020

Extinct genus of mammal

Saloumia is an extinct genus of the order Proboscidea. It is one of the oldest members of the order and lived in the middle Eocene of Senegal. It is known only from a single molar, whose pronounced bumpy chewing surface indicates it is probably closely related to Moeritherium.

== Description ==
The genus is known only from a partial upper molar 10.7 mm long and 12.3 mm wide, missing the posterior section. The molar is smaller than those of Moeritherium, but larger than those of Eritherium and Phosphatherium. The tooth was low-crowned, more clearly than that of Moeritherium. The masticatory surface had four cusps. However, their tips were apparently broken off before fossilization. The four cusps each formed two pairs, which were arranged perpendicular to the longitudinal axis of the tooth, giving it a bilophodont structure characteristic of early proboscideans. The front pair of cusps (the paracone and the protocone) had no additional ridges. The bases of the two cusps were connected to each other, and a side cusp formed a paraconule. The rear pair of cusps (the metacone and hypocone) are damaged, but the hypocone was originally relatively central and was very large, its dimensions similar to those of the protocone. Its inward shifted position differs from the more marginal position of Moeritherium's hypocone. There was no metaconule on the second pair of cusps. The central longitudinal groove, which divides the tooth into two halves was only weakly developed. A well-developed cingulum was present on the tongue side. The presence and position of the cingulum distinguishes Saloumia from Moeritherium. On both the tongue and cheek sides, the cingulum merged into a shearing edge. The enamel as a whole was thick and heavily grooved.

== Discovery and naming ==
Cladogram after Tabuce et al. 2019

- Proboscidea
  - Eritherium
  - - Phosphatherium
    - - Daouitherium
      - - Numidotherium
        - - - Barytherium
            - Omanitherium
          - - Arcanotherium
            - - Saloumia
              - Moeritherium
              - - Elephantiformes
                - Deinotheriidae

The sole specimen of Saloumia was found in the Lam-Lam Formation near the village of M’Bodione Dadere, north of the city of Kaolack in the central-western part of Senegal. The landscape in the region is relatively flat and is crossed by the Saloum River. The area contains several meters of Quaternary sands. Access to fossil outcrops is usually by means of well shafts and boreholes. The Lam-Lam formation consists of a limestone rich in mollusks and sea urchins, which alternates with a clayey limestone and marl. The limestones contain various foraminiferans, of which Globigerinatheca, Cassigerinelloita and Pseudohastigerina are typical of the Lutetian, around 44 million years ago. Other vertebrates from the Lam-Lam formation are mostly ray-finned fishes. The overlying Taïba Formation contained the remains of an archaeocete whale. The generic name is derived from the Saloum River. The specific epithet honors the geologist Alexandre Gorodiski, who discovered the tooth in 1952 during mapping work. Gorodiski published the find with René Lavocat a year later, describing it as a species of Moeritherium.
