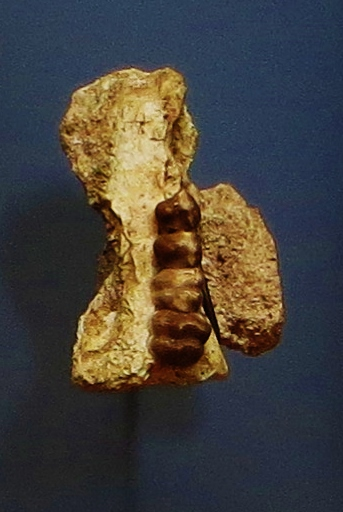
- Holotype of Phosphatherium

Scientific classification
- Kingdom: Animalia
- Phylum: Chordata
- Class: Mammalia
- Order: Proboscidea
- Family: †Numidotheriidae
- Genus: †Phosphatherium; Gheerbrant, Sudre & Cappetta, 1996
- Species: †P. escuilliei

Binomial name
- †Phosphatherium escuilliei Gheerbrant, Sudre & Cappetta, 1996

= Phosphatherium =

Phosphatherium Temporal range: Ypresian, 56–55 Ma

Extinct genus of mammals

Phosphatherium escuilliei, named by Gheerbrant, Sudre and Cappetta in 1996, is a basal proboscidean that lived in Africa during the Early Eocene, about 56-55 Ma. It is one of the earliest known proboscideans, together with Eritherium azzouzorum from the Selandian (about 60 Ma). It was found in phosphorites beds from the base of the Ypresian stage of the Ouled Abdoun Basin, which is best known for its exceptionally rich marine vertebrate fauna.

== Description ==
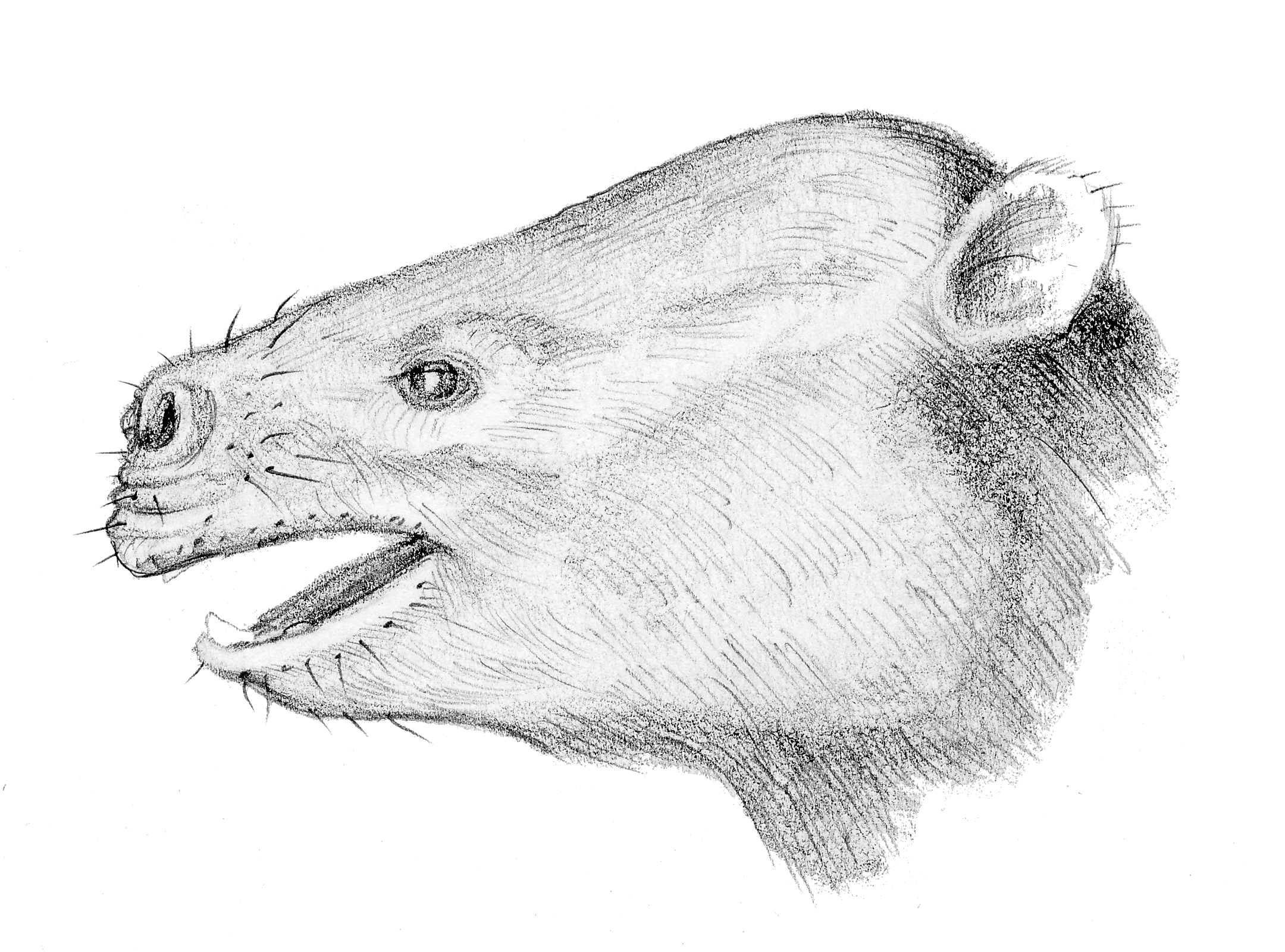
Restoration of the head by Dominique Visset

The species P. escuilliei is known from relatively well-preserved fossils, including several sub-complete skulls that have enabled the reconstruction of the animal's head.

The skull of Phosphatherium is very primitive compared to advanced proboscideans (Elephantiformes), for example the nasal openings are anterior, indicating that it lacked a trunk. Other plesiomorphic traits are the elongated face, the narrow rostrum, the strong sagittal and nuchal crests, the presence of an alisphenoid canal, the auditory meatus that remain open ventrally, the tooth rows that does not extend back more than half of the total skull length and the presence of a canine and anterior premolars. However, Phosphatherium shares several advanced characteristics (synapomorphies) with the proboscidean order, such as the development of the maxillary bone which forms the lower rim of the orbit and part of the robust zygomatic process, the petrosal that has large pars mastoidea, the frontal that is in contact with the squamosal, the molars with sharp transverse crests (true bilophodonty), the lower molar with posterior cusp (hypoconulid) shifted in labial position (first step in the development of a third loph found in later proboscideans such as elephantiforms) and the enlarged lower central incisor. The first lower incisor (I1) showed clear enlargements, but it was not vergrowing as in the tusks of modern elephants.The dental formula (number of teeth ) is nearly complete as in ancestral placentals, it only lack two anterior teeth (an incisor and the canine) at the lower jaw. Adult animals had indeed the following dental formula:

Dentition
?.1.4.3
2.0.4.3

The molars are low (brachyodont) and lophodont, with sharp transverse crests, which indicates that Phosphatherium had a herbivorous diet specialized in eating leaves (follivory). The skull length is about 17 cm.

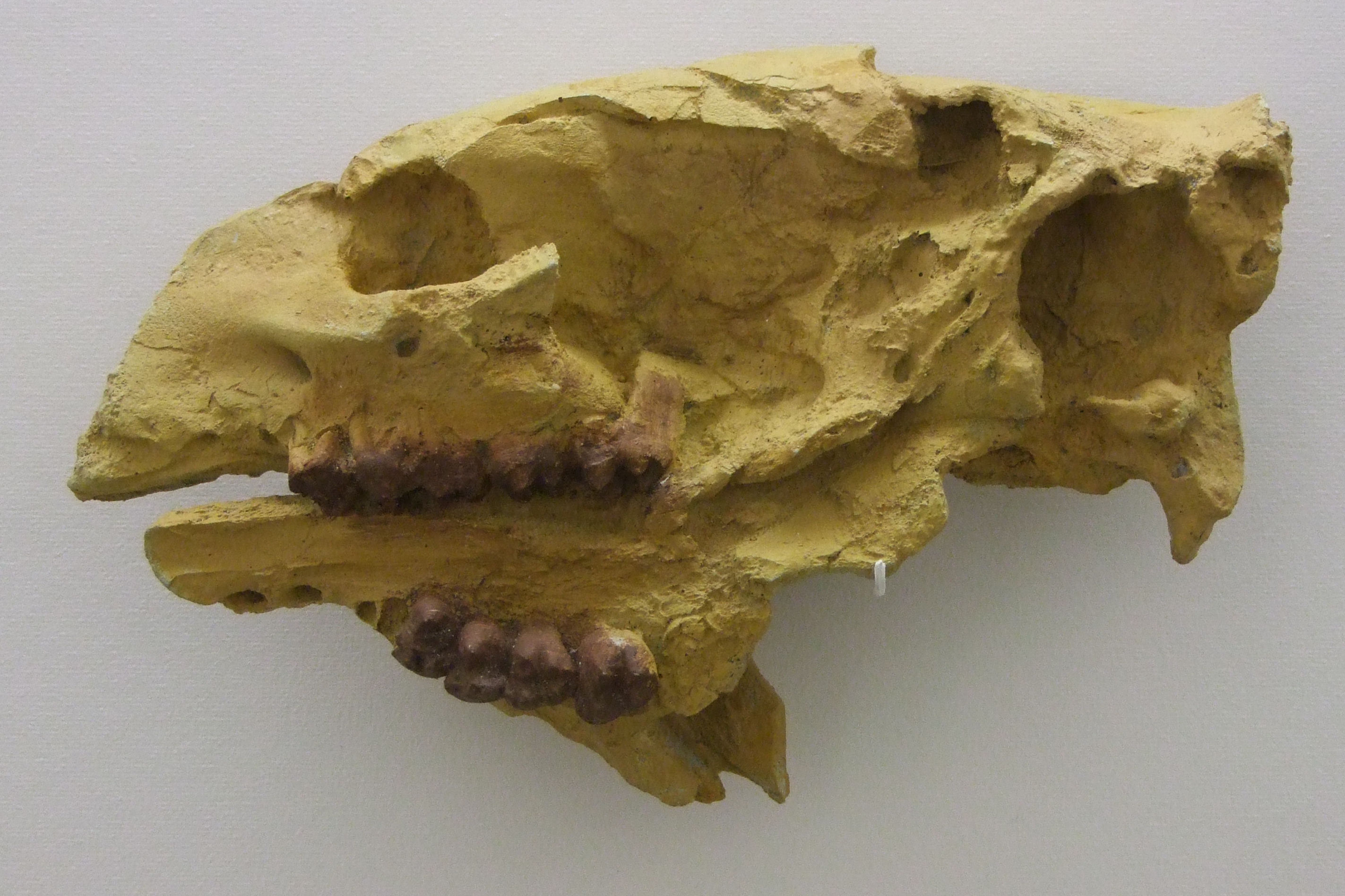
Skull of Phosphatherium

Some features of the teeth and jaw structures of P. escuilliei show significant individual variation, including the development of the molar crests (lophodonty). Part of this individual variation is related to sexual dimorphism. This includes the development of the submaxillary fossa housing muscles for mastication.

The Schmelzmuster of P. escuilliei has two layers, with the outer layer being composed of radial enamel and the inner layer of Hunter-Schreger bands (HSBs), which begin at the enamel-dentine junction and constitute about 85% of the enamel's thickness.

== Discovery ==
Map showing where fossils have been found

The first finds were probably made by a fossil dealer in the early 1990s from an unknown location. The two fragments of the upper jaw were coated with phosphate, and the preparation of the finds revealed the tooth of a fossil shark, which dates to the late Paleocene (Thanetian) and thus confirms the ancient age of the finds. The holotype (copy number MNHN PM2) consists of a right upper part of the jaw with the last two premolars and the first two molars (P3 to M2). It is now in the Muséum National d'Histoire Naturelle in Paris. The first scientific description took place in 1996 by Emmanuel Gheerbrant and colleagues. The name Phosphatherium is made up of the Greek words φωςφορος (phosphoros "light-bearing") and θηρίον ( thērion "animal") and refers to the fact that it is stored in phosphate-containing sediments. The only known species is Phosphatherium escuilliei. The species name escuilliei honors the person who found the type fossils, François Escuillié. The first description was largely limited to the tooth features, a more extensive template of the then known find material was only published two years later.

The first fossil finds were discovered in the north-eastern part of the Ouled Abdoun Basin in a phosphate-containing layer. However, they only comprised two fragmented upper jaws. However, the exact location of this find was not known. Further and much more extensive finds were discovered in the early 2000s in the same basin in the Grand Daoui area. This consists of numerous skull fragments, mandibles and some limb elements. Other very early proboscideans are known from the same area, the related Eritherium and Daouitherium.

== Taxonomy ==
Phosphatherium is known primarily from two maxilla fragments dated to the latest Paleocene deposits of the Ouled Abdoun Basin, Morocco, which date from the Thanetian epoch. It is one of the oldest and smallest members of the Proboscidea, with an estimated shoulder height of about 30 centimetres (12 in) and body mass of 17 kilograms (37 lb). Like its later relative, Moeritherium, the animal was probably an amphibious browser that fed on aquatic plants, akin to a very small tapir. Both animals are included in the family Numidotheriidae, together with Numidotherium.

Below is a phylogenetic tree based on Tabuce et al. 2019.

- Proboscidea
  - Eritherium
  - - Phosphatherium
    - - Daouitherium
      - - Numidotherium
        - - - Barytherium
            - Omanitherium
          - - Arcanotherium
            - - Saloumia
              - Moeritherium
              - - Derived Proboscidea (Elephantiformes)
                - Deinotheriidae

== Palaeobiology ==
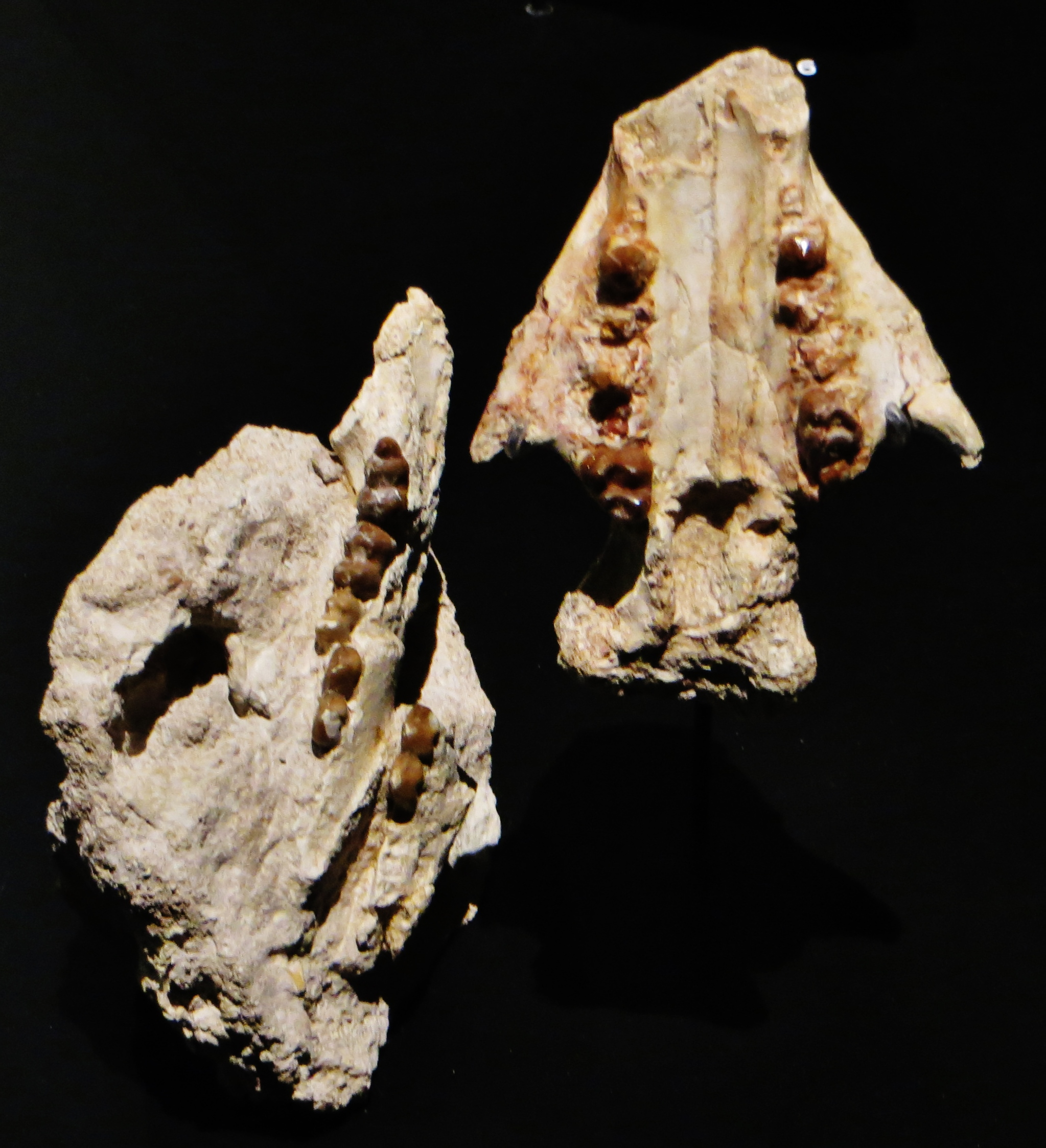
Jaw fragments

Phosphatherium is thought to have had a broad diet. The dental microwear patterns observed on their teeth show lengthy scratches on the molars of juveniles. Correspondingly, similar patterns are found on adult individuals. Through study of the wear and specifically scratches on the teeth of Phosphatherium, the food items it ingested include shrubs and bushes, indicating a mixed feeding preference. Adult molars are found to have a much higher density of scratches, indicating abrasive food sources and possibly insects and small animals. Overall, Phosphatherium is thought to be an omnivorous browser mainly determined by its preferences, as well as the availability of resources.

Considering its highly adapted folivorous jaw and tooth structure, Phosphatherium provides evidence of the high age of African endemism. The dental structure of Phosphatherium suggests its diet consisted mainly of leaves, which indicates it may have fulfilled a niche role in its environment, although diet can only be inferred. The discovery of this animal has ultimately helped reinforce the African origin of proboscideans, and provide insight into the radiation of modern orders of placental mammals.
