= Boone Township, Franklin County, Missouri =

Inactive township in the US state of Missouri

Coordinates: 38.3111°N 91.2869°W

Boone Township is an inactive township in Franklin County, in the U.S. state of Missouri.

== Geography ==
=== Major highways ===
- US Highway 50
- MO-185

=== Adjacent Townships ===
- Caanan Township
- Brush Creek Township
- Lyon Township
- Boone Township(Crawford County)
- Oak Hill Township
- Meramec Township
- Union Township

== Communities ==
=== Cities ===
- Leslie
- Gerald

=== Unincorporated communities ===
- Champion City
- Spring Bluff
- Japan
- Elmont

== History ==
Boone Township was established in 1832, and named after Boone Creek.
