= Walbert, Missouri =

Extinct town in the American state of Missouri

Coordinates: 38°19′48″N 91°19′55″W

Walbert is an extinct town in western Franklin County, in the U.S. state of Missouri. The community was on a hillside above the Bourbeuse River between Red Oak Creek to the west and Clates Creek to the east. The New Friendship Church and cemetery lie to the east; about one quarter mile above Clates Creek.

A post office called Walbert was established in 1895 and remained in operation until 1910. The community's name is an amalgamation of the first names of Walter and Herbert Baur, the sons of an early postmaster.
