= Research history of Mammut =

Studies of an extinct genus of proboscidean

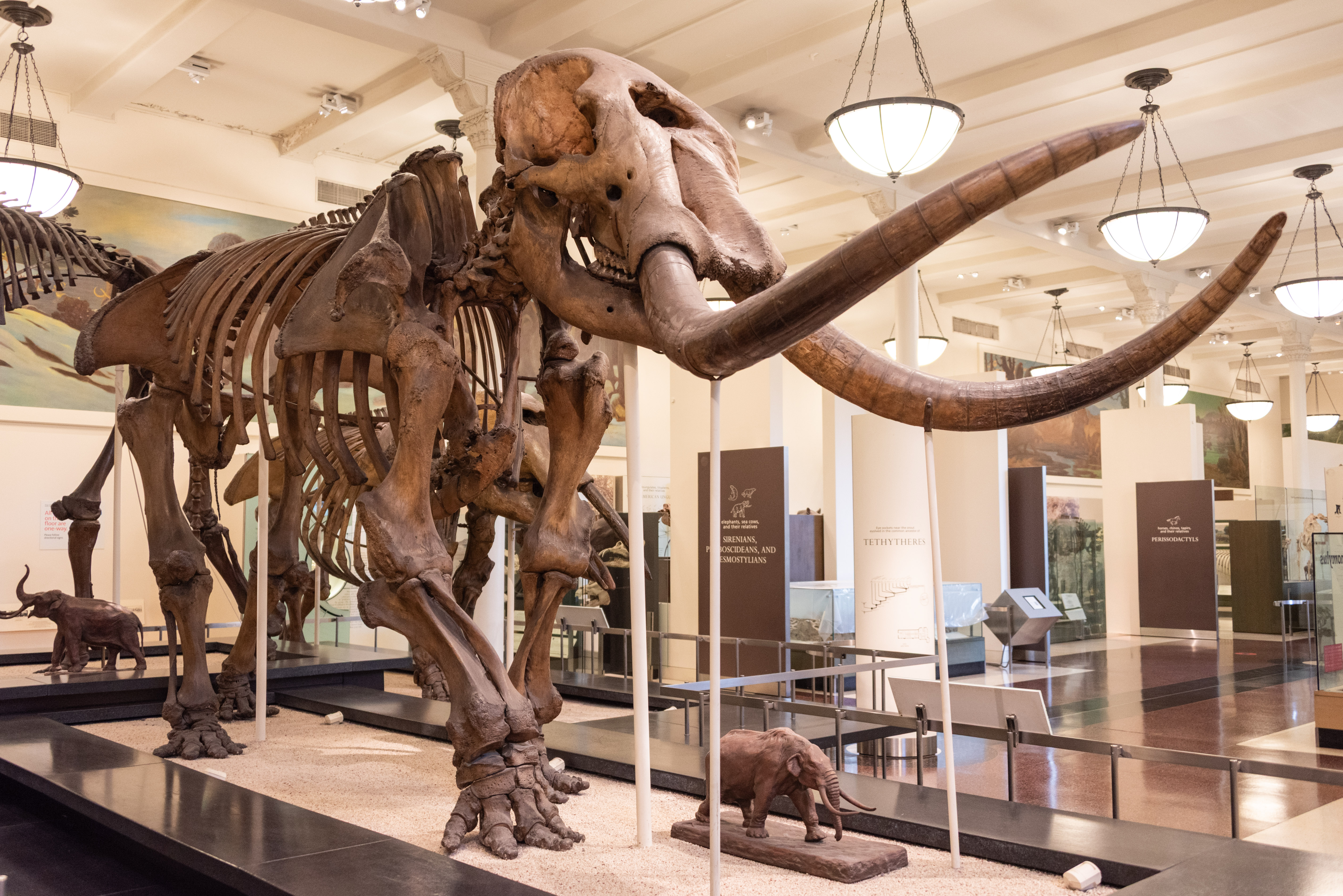
Mounted M. americanum skeleton, American Museum of Natural History

The research history of Mammut is extensive given its complicated taxonomic and non-taxonomic histories, with the earliest recorded fossil finds dating back to 1705 in Claverack, New York during the colonial era of what is now the United States of America. Initially thought to belong to biblical antediluvian giants, the fossils were later determined to belong to a proboscidean species as a result of more complete 18th century finds from the locality of Big Bone Lick in what is now Kentucky. The molars were studied by European and American naturalists, who were generally baffled on its lack of analogue to modern elephants, leading to varying hypothesis on the affinities of the teeth. More complete skeletons were found after the independence of the United States colonies from Great Britain within the early 19th century. American historians of the 21st century have made arguments that the early history of M. americanum finds and studies played major roles in shaping American nationalism on the basis of the large sizes and relative completeness of the fossils to disprove the negative theory of social degeneracy in North America.

Taxonomically, the mammutid was recognized as a distinct species by Robert Kerr in 1792 ("Elephas" americanus) and as the genus Mammut by Johann Friedrich Blumenbach in 1799. Mammut is one of the first fossil mammal genera to be erected with valid taxonomic authority. However, naturalists of the 19th century generally adopted the name Mastodon, which was established as an informal term in 1806 and as a genus in 1817 by the French naturalist Georges Cuvier. "Mastodon" for its taxonomic history served as a wastebasket taxon for any fossil proboscidean species whose dentitions appeared closer to Mammut americanum than to those of the Elephantidae or Deinotheriidae. The genus Mammut and its type species M. americanum have both accumulated plenty of junior synonyms as a result of species oversplitting.

After major taxonomic revisions of proboscideans within the 20th century, Mammut was recognized as the prioritized synonym over Mastodon and no longer as regularly served as a wastebasket taxon. In addition, more species names were recognized over the course of the 20th–21st centuries based on fossils from western North American localities, although most were initially classified under the junior synonym Pliomastodon. Today, Mammut is well-recognized for its abundant fossil evidence in the case of M. americanum (or "American mastodon") and is frequently displayed in natural history museum institutions.

== "Giant's" teeth and bones finds ==
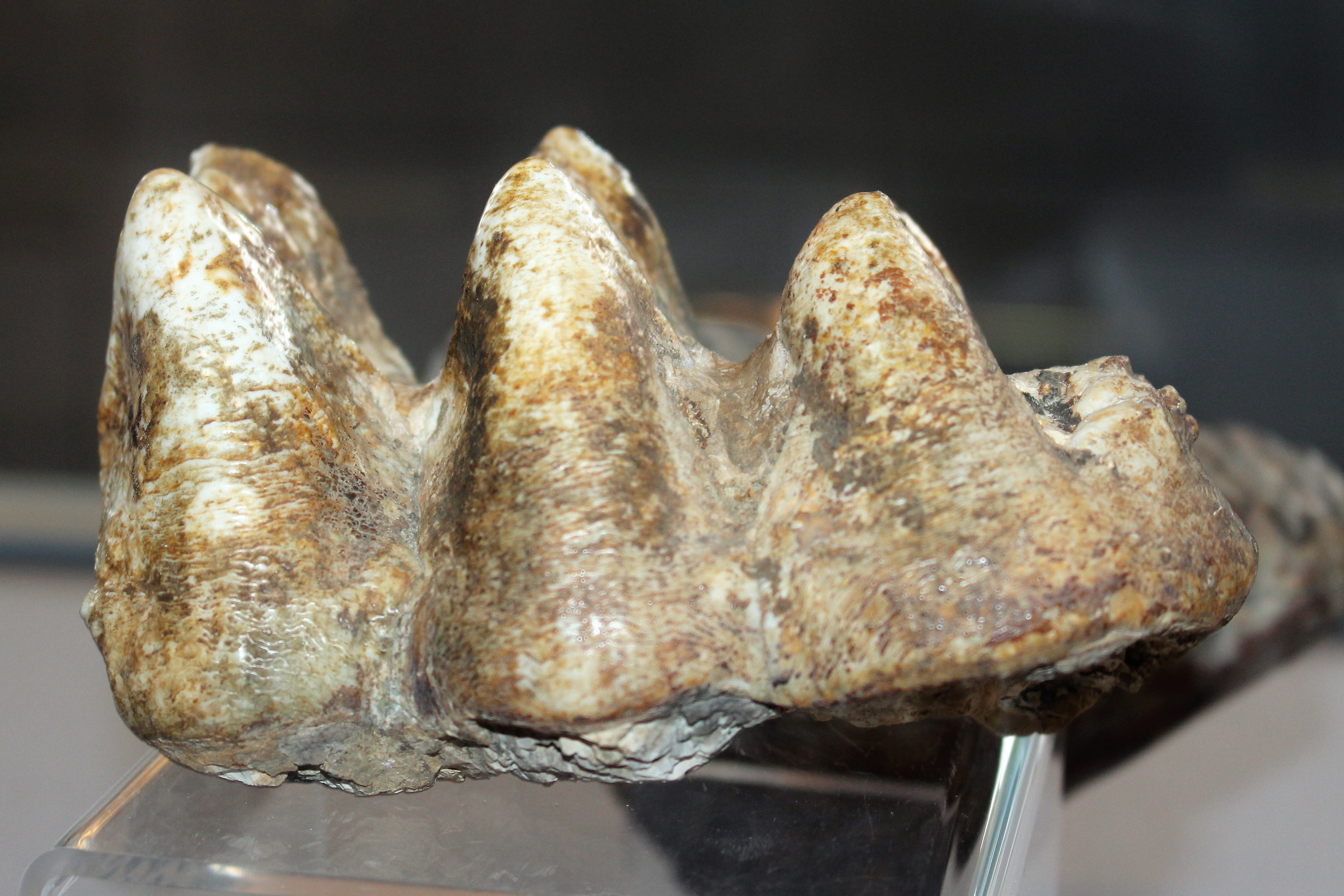
Mammut americanum molar tooth, Rotunda Museum

The earliest account of known fossils of Mammut dates back to 30 July 1705 when The Boston News-Letter described an account, dating to 23 July 1705 in New York, of teeth and a bone of a "giant" uncovered from the town of Claverack, New York. The newspaper stated that it was large-sized, weighed over 4 lb (1.8 kg), and was dug up some 30 ft (9.1 m) to 40 ft (12 m) underground from a river bank or hill. It also reported that they uncovered a femur (reported as a "thigh bone") and another flat, broad tooth with a length equivalent to four fingers of a human, but both crumbled shortly after being uncovered before they could be observed by anatomical experts. According to Louisiana State University professor Donald E. Stanford in 1959, the news brought great excitement to some people of the time as they saw it as potentially proving the existence of antediluvian giants as chronicled by the Bible.

Further details regarding the history of the tooth from 1705 were provided in a letter dated to 1713 (although likely written earlier) when Edward Hyde, 3rd Earl of Clarendon (known also as Lord Cornbury), communicated his report from New York to the Royal Society, a learned society of Great Britain. In his subjoined letter, Lord Cornbury wrote that he sent them the "tooth of a Giant" from a Virginia fleet, desiring that it be sent to Gresham College. According to the English aristocrat, the tooth was found near the side of the Hudson River by a Dutch country-fellow and was sold to New York General Assembly member Van Bruggen for a gill of rum. Bruggen showed the tooth to several other people, including Lord Cornbury, and was originally going to dispose of it due to its perceived worthlessness. However, he instead gave it to Lord Cornbury, who speculated that it may have a tooth of a giant as opposed to a beast or fish. He then stated that he sent Johannis Abeel, a recorder of Albany, New York, to dig near the original site of the tooth to find more bones. A later letter by Abeel reveals that he traveled to Claverack where the original bones were found. He said that workers uncovered bones of a corpse that was about thirty feet long but that almost all decayed, as most broke into pieces as soon as they were handled. Author Paul Semonin said that the accounts written by Cornbury and Abeel match up with that written by the correspondent of The Boston News-Letter.

In a diary entry by Edward Taylor dating to the summer of 1706, the writer wrote that a Dutchman named Koon brought to his house a fist-sized tooth different from that in Claverack that weighed over 2 lb (0.91 kg). Semonin suggested based on known primary sources that the Dutchmen from Albany were traveling around the American colonies with their items, later visiting Massachusetts governor Joseph Dudley in July 1706 to show him the tooth. In a letter to his friend Cotton Mather, he wrote about his experience with the two Dutchmen and reaffirmed his opinion that the tooth belonged to the biblical giants.

Cotton Mather used the accounts from The Boston News-Letter and the letter from Dudley to communicate about the large bones and teeth to the English naturalist John Woodward in an account dating to 17 November 1712, which were referenced in the Philosophical Transactions of the Royal Society journal in 1714. In it, he reinforced the theory that the teeth and bones belonged to antediluvian giants that were apparently once present in the New England region.

According to Semonin, England's naturalists shifted away from the idea that the large fossils were of humanoids, an idea created by the advent of a discoveries of preserved Siberian mammoths and subsequent comparative anatomies to extant elephants. In addition, a mammoth tooth recovered from South Carolina in 1724 or 1725 was described by Mark Catesby in a journal dating to 1743 as identified by North American slaves from Africa as belonging to an elephant, marking a shift away from identifications of fossils as belonging to human giants.

== Big Bone Lick fossils ==
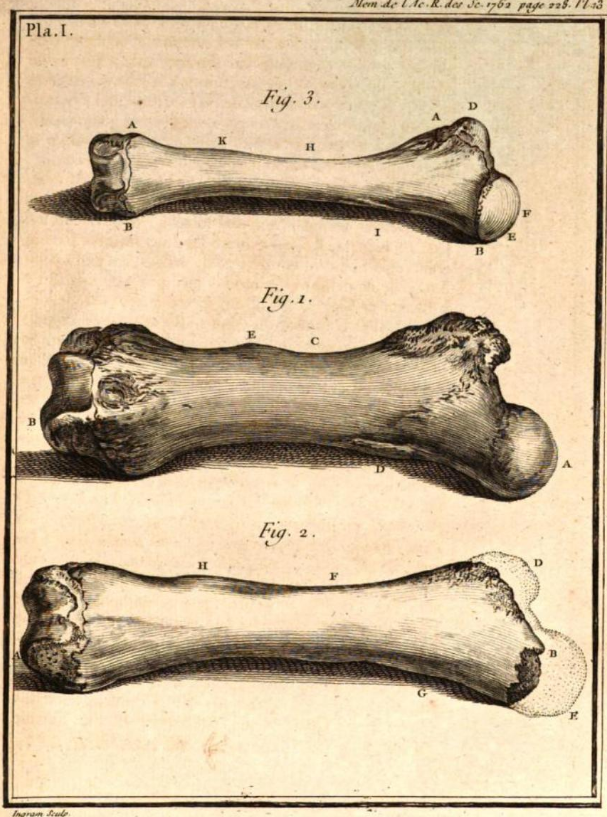
Engravings of the femurs of an unspecified extant elephant species (top), M. americanum (middle), and a "Siberian" mammoth (bottom), 1764

In 1739, a French military expedition under the command of Charles III Le Moyne (known also as "Longueil") explored the locality of "Big Bone Lick" in what is now Kentucky, an area previously known by Native Americans. Le Moyne gathered an assortment of fossil bones and teeth from the locality. The discovery of the locality by Le Moyne's military was part of a military campaign against the Chickasaw nation as part of the Chickasaw Wars in the 18th century. Upon his return to France in 1740, Le Moyne deposited a large femur, a tusk, and three molars in a collection of the Cabinet du Roi in the French botanical garden Jardin des plantes. The erroneous date of 1729 instead of 1739 as the year that Le Moyne uncovered fossils was the result of a rewritten note for a map of eastern North America that listed the wrong year. A different account by French officer Jean Bernard Bossu recorded that in 1735, his Canadian military party recovered several skeletons of "elephants" from the site, leading him to believe that the proboscideans may have wandered off from Asia to North America.

In 1762, French naturalist Louis Jean-Marie Daubenton reported that he examined the fossil collection brought by Longueuil from the Big Bone Lick and compared it with a Siberian femur and bones of extant elephants. Daubenton said that the bones were discovered by Native Americans (probably Abenaki hunter-warriors) who found them on a marsh's edges and took them to Longueuil's camp in Ohio territory as a gift. He came to the conclusion that the femur and tusk belonged to an elephant while the three molars were unlike those of true elephants and therefore came from a separate giant hippopotamus. Today, the molars are identified as belonging to M. americanum.

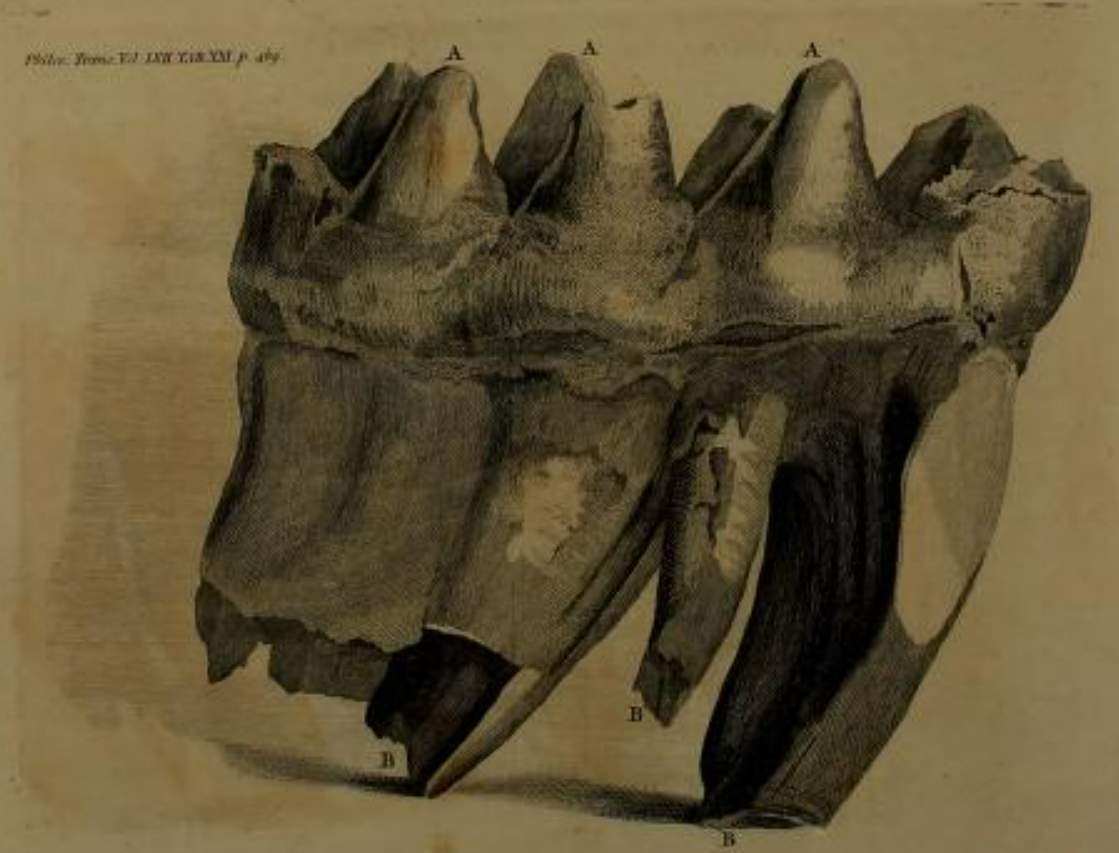
M. americanum molar illustration as provided in 1767

The same year, several Native Americans of the Shawnee tribe brought a large tooth and a tusk to Henry Bouquet presumably as a gift to tie with British authorities after a long time of hostility due to the French and Indian War. Bouquet wrote to John Bartram about the large fossils, believing that elephants had formerly existed in North America. Bartram contacted Quaker naturalist James Wright about the tooth and tusk fossils at Fort Pitt. Using an interpreter, Wright learned from two Shawnee individuals that there were five entire skeletons of mammutids lying with their heads pointing towards one another. They believed that the five proboscideans were all killed by a lightning strike. When Wright asked them if they had ever seen them alive, the Shawnee interviewees responded that nobody had ever seen the creatures alive due to the bones having been observed as ancient. In Shawnee tradition, the mammals roamed in herds and were hunted by giants, who both eventually died out. The accounts told by the Shawnee individuals in 1762 are the oldest known documented interpretations of the Ohio fossils, although the traditions may have had been told for generations based on careful fossil observations.

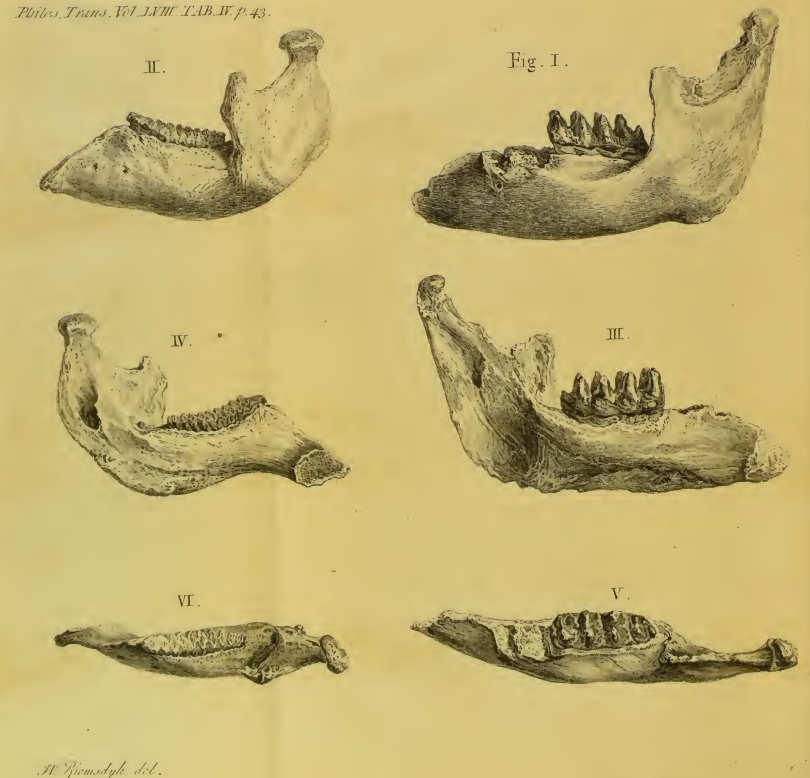
Jaws of an extant elephant in different views (left) compared to the jaws of Mammut (right)

The prospects of the Big Bone Lick also attracted Irish trader George Croghan, who collected some bones on his journey down Ohio before then being attacked by a group of Kickapoo and Mascouten members, resulting in several people on Croghan's party being killed and Croghan being captured. He was eventually released, although he lost his fossil collection in the process. He later recollected enough fossils to send to both William Petty, 2nd Earl of Shelburne (or Lord Shelburne) and Benjamin Franklin in 1767. Croghan was thanked by both Franklin and his friend Peter Collinson the same year for the fossils, leading them to question why so many proboscidean fossils were preserved in the Big Bone Lick site and how they were apparently present in North America in the first place. Collinson in one of his scholarly papers concluded that the peculiar grinders (the molars) were built for herbivorous diets of branches of trees and shrubs as well as other vegetation, a view later followed by Franklin.

Scottish anatomist William Hunter described fossils of the mammutid from the Midwestern locality in 1768, recalling that French naturalists thought of the bones as belonging to elephants. Hunter agreed that the tusks were like those of elephants, but he and his brother John Hunter observed that the teeth were not like those of modern elephants. He determined that the "grinders" from Ohio were of a carnivorous animal but believed that the tusks belonged to the same animal. After examining fossils from Franklin and Lord Shelburne, Hunter was convinced that the "pseudo-elephant", or "animal incognitum" (shortened as "incognitum"), was an animal species separate from elephants that might have also been the same as the proboscideans found in Siberia. He concluded his article with the opinion that although regrettable to philosophers, humanity should be thankful to heaven that the animal, if truly carnivorous, was extinct. Semonin argued that Hunter's usage of the word "extinct" for the fossil animal was controversial, as it pushed the ideas that the extinction of the "carnivorous" animal was a blessing for the human race and that wild animals and "inferior" human races were subject to extinctions over "superior" human races under the will of God's creation.

== Early American observations ==
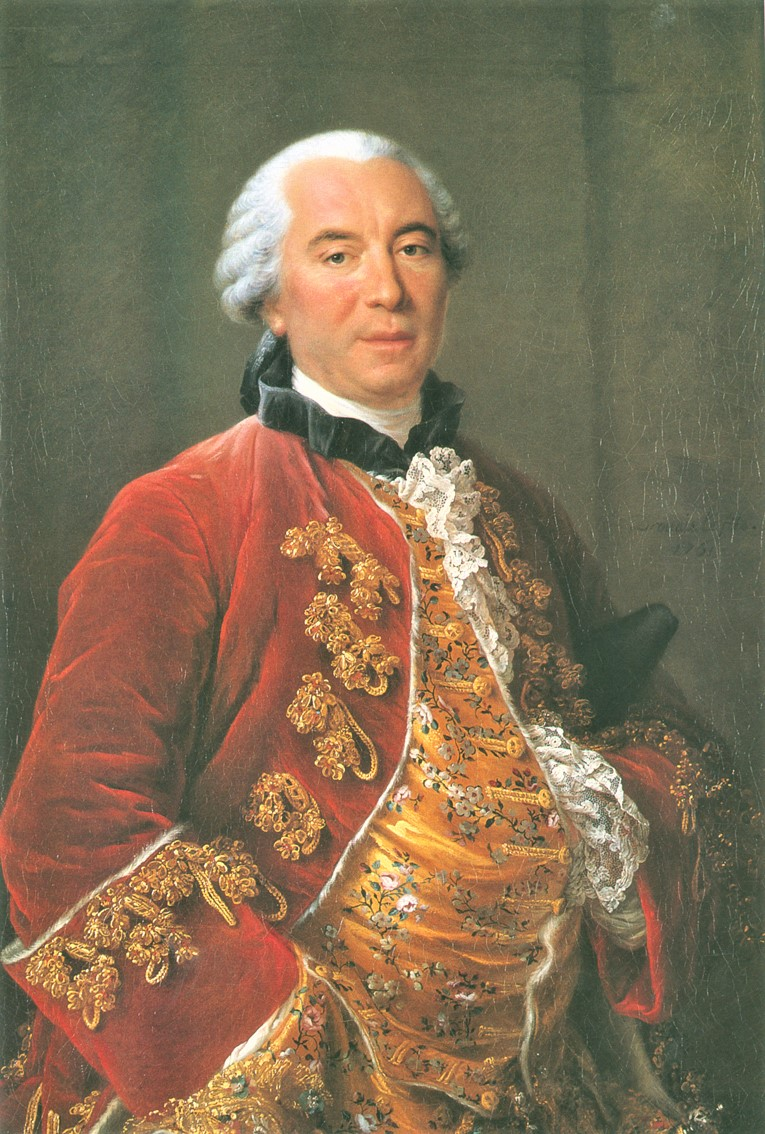
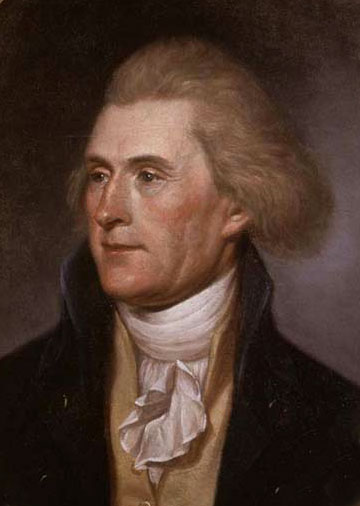
Georges-Louis Leclerc, Comte de Buffon (left) proposed the 18th-century theory that faunas of North America were subject to "social degeneration," or reductions in sizes, an idea that was opposed by Thomas Jefferson (right)

For much of the 18th century, the theory of social degeneration, an idea envisioned by Georges-Louis Leclerc, Comte de Buffon in which the New World continents, because of the cold climates and humidity, caused living humans and other animals to degrade in size. The idea also pushed concepts of evolution of species and extinction, making it controversial at the time. A tooth of the "incognitum" from Ohio that was sent to Buffon by Collinson in 1767 may have challenged Buffon's perception of degeneracy, as Buffon previously mostly ignored fossil evidence from North America. Semonin defined the events as setting up a basis for American nationalism, since American degeneracy was seen as an offensive concept by Anglo-American naturalists.

Fossils of Mammut from the Big Bone Lick locality were regularly collected by merchants from Philadelphia, Pennsylvania and Native American traders, who sold the remains to American connoisseurs and European scientific communities. At least a few were collected by upper class Americans with interest in natural history.

In December 1785, Reverend Robert Annan wrote an account recalling an event in which workers discovered bones in his farm near the Hudson River in New York in fall of 1780. The workers found four molars in addition to another that was broken and thrown away. They also uncovered bones, including vertebrae that broke shortly after. Annan expressed his confusion at what the animal could be but speculated based on its "grinders" that it was carnivorous in diet. He speculated also that it was probably extinct due to some catastrophe within the globe. The reverend also noted that George Washington visited his house to see the remains, the American Revolutionary War general informing him that he had a molar from Ohio. The account was eventually published in 1793. Washington's visit to Annan's house to view the fossils meant news to other people in the New England region, a US colonel named David Humphreys informing Yale University president Ezra Stiles that Washington kept fossil teeth from Ohio that resembled those at Annan's farm.

American statesman Thomas Jefferson wrote his Notes on the State of Virginia the same time that the fossils from Annan's farm were described, eventually having it published in 1785. Referring to the fossil proboscideans of North America as "mammoths" and mentioning that Native Americans called them "big buffaloes," Jefferson stated his thoughts that they may have been carnivorous, still exist in the northern parts of North America, and are related to mammoths whose remains were found in Siberia. Jefferson expressed his opinion that the "grinders" did not belong to hippopotamuses for the reason that no skeletal remains of them had ever been found in North America. The statesman was also cautious of the idea that elephants and mammoths were the same animals. Jefferson referenced Buffon's theory of American degeneracy, countering it by using extant and extinct animal measurements, including those of "mammoths," as proof that North America faunas were not "degenerative" in size.

== Early taxonomic history ==
In the 1790s, the "American incognitum" was subject to research by multiple taxonomists. Scottish writer Robert Kerr erected the species name Elephas americanus in 1792 based on fossil tusks and "grinders" from the Big Bone Lick locality. He stated that the tusks were similar to elephants while the molars were completely different because they were covered with enamel and had a double row of high conical cusp processes. Kerr was unsure about the taxonomic affinities of the molars and referenced that Thomas Pennant supposed that they belong to an unknown species within the genus Elephas, giving the common name "American elephant."

German naturalist Johann Friedrich Blumenbach also followed up with more taxonomic descriptions of fossil proboscideans in 1799. The first fossil species, recovered from Germany, was described as belonging to the newly erected species Elephas primigenius? (now known as Mammuthus primigenius). The second was what he considered to be an unknown "colossal land monster of the prehistoric world," considering it to be the "mammoth." He created the genus Mammut and erected the species Mammut ohioticum based on fossil bones dug up from Ohio in North America. He said that the species was distinguished from other animals of the prehistoric world based on the unusual shapes of the large molars. The genus name "Mammut" refers to the German translation for "mammoth."

French naturalist Georges Cuvier also described known fossil proboscidean species back in 1796, although his account was later published in 1799. He considered that the remains uncovered from Siberia were true "mammoths" that had similar dentitions to extant elephants but had some morphological differences. He mentioned the fossil remains that were brought back by Longueil from Ohio back in 1739 and several researchers from previous decades who noted the unusual molars and thought that they belonged to different animals like hippopotamuses. He followed recognition in the previously established species "Elephas americanus" and argued that the species was different from elephants and mammoths and cannot be found amongst living animals due to extinction from catastrophism.

The proboscidean species was subject to several other species names given by other taxonomists within the earliest 18th century, such as the genus name Harpagmotherium by the Russian naturalist Gotthelf Fischer von Waldheim in 1808.

== Peale's complete skeleton exhibition ==
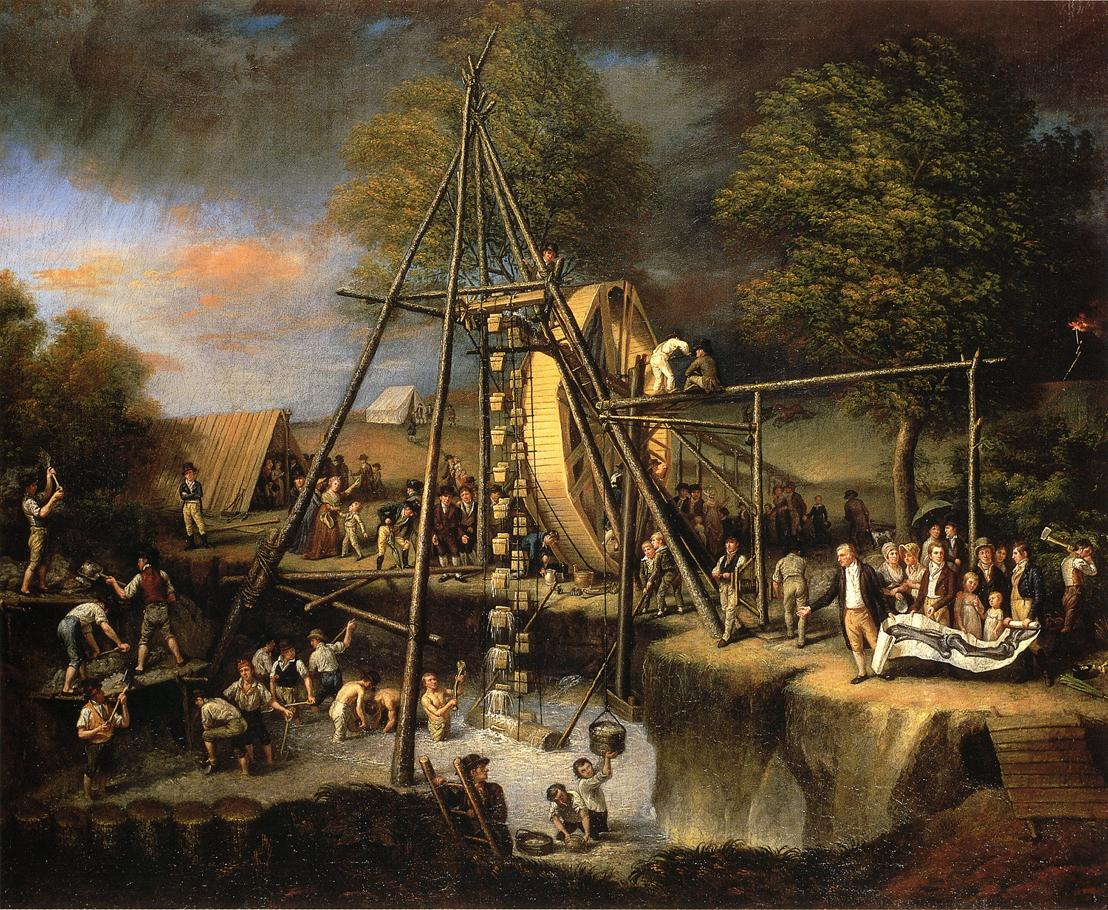
The 1806–1808 painting The Exhumation of the Mastodon by Charles Willson Peale

American painter Charles Willson Peale worked with Mammut fossils as early as 1783 when he was commissioned by the German physician Christian Friedrich Michaelis to draw the mammutid fossils in the collection belonging to American physician John Morgan. He also opened his own Philadelphia Museum in 1786, but it was not until the 19th century that it became significant to the paleontological history of Mammut. In June 1801, he visited Newburgh, New York to view skeletal remains found on a farm belonging to John Masten. The skeletal remains began to be uncovered as early as 1799 when workers found an approximately 18 in (460 mm) long thighbone while digging a marl pit at the farm locality. A crowd of about one hundred people gathered to view the skeletal discoveries, including local physician and later fossil locality supervisor James G. Graham. Although many of the specimens were broken in the process, they were part of the first known complete skeleton of Mammut. Initially, Masten refused to sell the fossils in order to wait for all skeletal remains to be dug up.

Peale at first asked Masten for permission to sketch the skeletal remains, but he later purchased full ownership of the fossils from Masten for $300 ($200 for the already excavated bones and $100 for additional excavations for fossils on his estate). Shortly after exhibiting his large-scale drawings of the fossils to the American Philosophical Society (APS) in Philadelphia, he asked the circle's vice president Robert Patterson for inquiry regarding a loan to complete excavation at Masten's farm. The APS's members unanimously voted to provide Peale $500 for his endeavors on 24 July 1801. To unearth the skeleton in Masten's farm, they used a mill-like device to drain a 12 ft (3.7 m) deep marl pit. Although the endeavors were almost threatened by a thunderstorm and potential flood, the storm passed, allowing for completion of the excavations. Additional remains were yielded at nearby excavations at two other farms of Joseph Barber and Peter Millspaw (the former farm part of a site now called the "Peale's Barber Farm Mastodon Exhumation Site"), the latter of which yielded a second skeleton. Peale thought that the event involving the excavation of the fossils were worth portraying as an artwork, producing a painting now called The Exhumation of the Mastodon in 1806–1808. The excavations themselves cost nearly $2,000 due to the hirings of workers and the construction of the wheel.

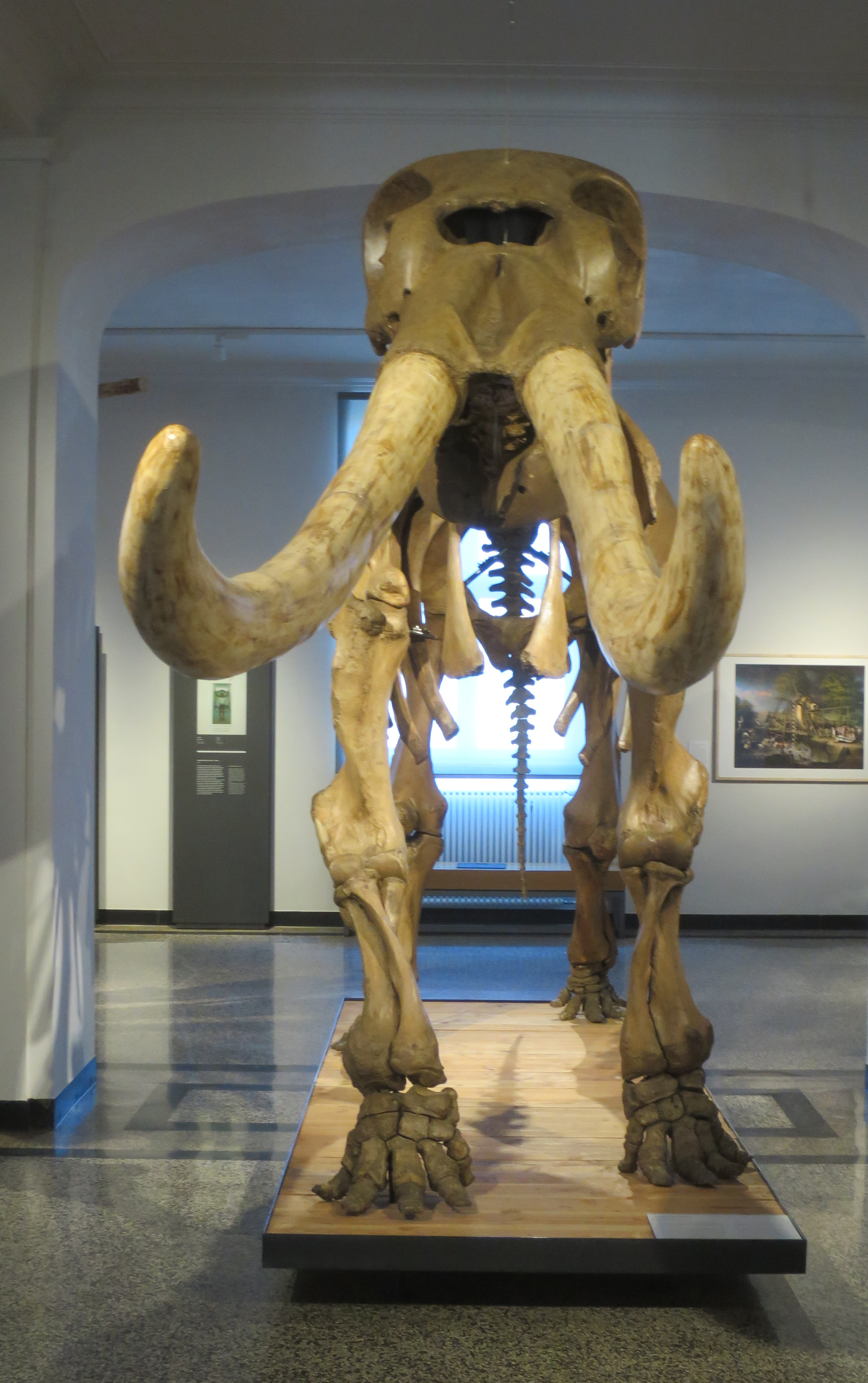
Mammut skeleton previously displayed by Charles Peale at his museum, now on display at Hessisches Landesmuseum Darmstadt

Charles Peale returned to assemble a complete skeleton of Mammut from September 1801 up until December of the same year, when on 4 December, he formally announced that he was preparing to display the assembled skeleton for the month. On 24 December, Peale invited members of the American Philosophical Society to view the displayed skeleton, and its exhibit was opened to the public the next day on 25 December. While admission to the museum cost 25 cents, admission to the "Skeleton of the Mammoth" exhibit cost an additional 50 cents. The exhibit was viewable to the public for six nights a week since Peale installed lamps there. Peale was able to repay his debts to the American Philosophical Society thanks to the profits of the exhibit. The exhibit earned Peale profits of around $3,000 between 1803 and 1807. The exhibition, featuring the first complete skeleton of Mammut (known also as "Peale's Mastodon"), was a huge success that attracted thousands of visitors to Peale's museum, the skeleton becoming famous and a US national symbol.

Charles Peale entrusted the job of promotion of the articulated skeleton to his son Rembrandt Peale, who took it with him on his tour to Europe. There, it was used for promotions of the fossil proboscidean and for Jefferson's final rebuttals against Buffon's arguments for supposed inferiority of American faunas. Author Keith Stewart Thomson argued that the promotion of the "mastodon" skeleton made it a symbol of the strength of American nationalism and that "mammoth" as a term became associated with gigantism.

Although Jefferson shifted towards the view that the "mammoth" of North America was a browser, Charles Peale and Rembrandt Peale both thought of it as being carnivorous in contrast to elephants. After his return from Europe, Rembrandt Peale decided to curve the tusks of the articulated skeleton down, justifying in 1803 that the tusks would have been used in rooting up shellfish from the ground or climbing up river banks and lakes. It was not until 1826 that John Davidson Godman restored the upward positions of the tusks of the skeleton, using Cuvier's observations of "Mastodon" to argue that no evidence points towards downward-curving tusks. Another skeleton that was toured in Europe was transferred by Rembrandt Peale to his own museum in Baltimore, opened against his father's wishes in 1814, where they were displayed on a ceiling for a few years.

As a result of the museum's bankruptcy, the first skeleton's specimens were sold to some German spectators in around 1848, who failed to sell them to French king Louis Philippe I, the British Museum, and the Royal College of Surgeons of England. It was temporarily displayed in London but was eventually sold to Hessisches Landesmuseum Darmstadt in Germany where it is now displayed. The second skeleton's specimens landed eventually at the American Museum of Natural History. The skeleton in Rembrandt Peale's museum was acquired by John Collins Warren in 1852, who deposited it in Harvard University. By 1991, only fifteen bones of the skeleton remained, and they were transferred back to the Peale Museum in Baltimore.

== Cuvier's proboscidean research ==
=== Cuvier's proboscidean reevaluations ===
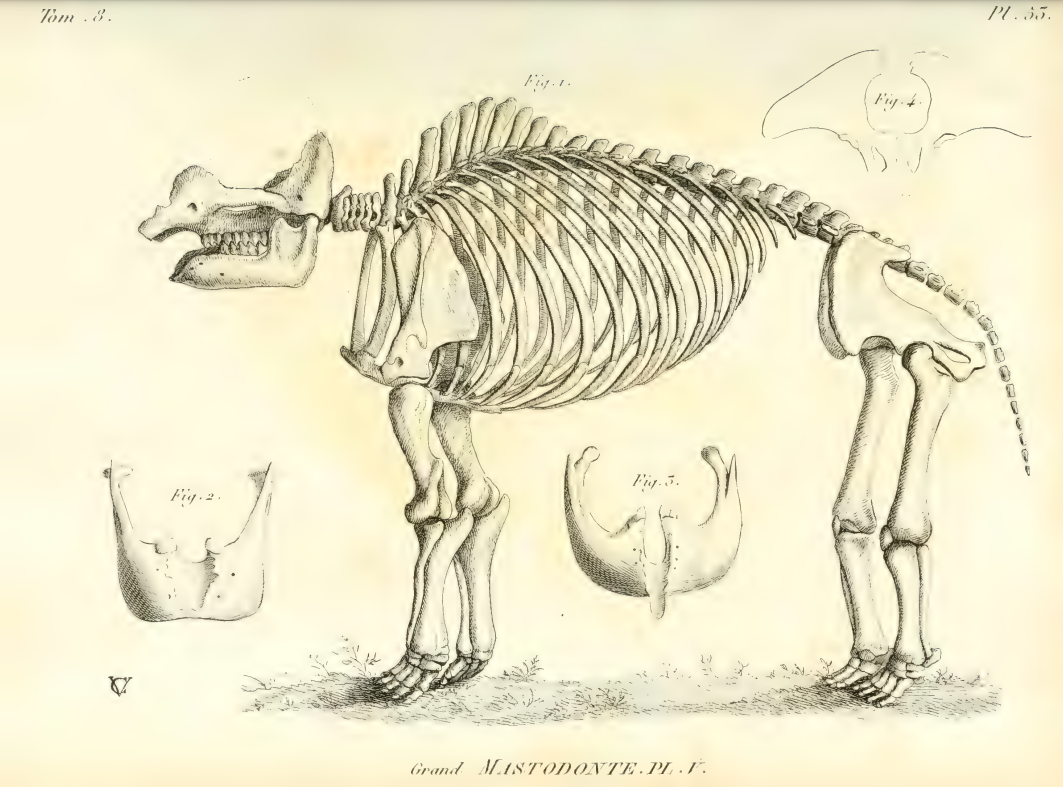
Sketch of the skeleton of Mammut, labeled as "Mastodonte"

In 1806, Cuvier wrote multiple extended research articles on fossil proboscideans of Eurasia and the Americas. He stated that the bones that Buffon previously described from North America were not of elephants but another animal that he referred to as the "mastodonte," or the "animal of Ohio." He also made reference to the molars from mammoths previously identified by Catesby and the African slaves and said that the bones of the "mastodons" were much more common in North America than those of "elephants." He also reported about fossil bones of proboscideans that German naturalist Alexander von Humboldt uncovered from what is now Colombia. Humboldt reported back in 1803 that he sent a collection of the fossil bones similar African elephants and the Ohio proboscidean to Cuvier. Cuvier wrote that more thorough examinations revealed to him that the fossils belonged to a different species of "mastodon."

Cuvier reinforced the idea that the extinct "mastodon" was an animal close in relationship to elephants that differed by jaws with large tubercles. He also said that it was improperly referred to by English and American people as "mammoths." He also said that it was the largest of all fossil animals, especially with the large-sized molars for which there are no modern analogues. The French naturalist emphasized that the Siberian mammoths were historically confused with American "mammoths" by other naturalists despite not being the same. As a result, he suggested that "mammoth" and "carnivorous elephant" be discontinued as names for the species and that it receive a new genus name instead. Cuvier said that for "mastodonte," he derived the name's etymology (compound μαστός (mastós, "breast") + ὀδούς (odoús, "tooth") from Ancient Greek to mean "nipple tooth," since he thought that it expressed the characteristic form of the teeth. He also made an account of the history of the mammutid based on prior scientific literature, mentioning the early 18th-century teeth, the Big Bone Lick locality, and Peale's skeletons. Cuvier also described fossils from Europe that he said belonged to "mastodons." He also noted that the molars were different in form from elephants by the rectangular and narrow shapes and presences of furrows, making them more similar to those of hippopotamuses and pigs.

In another article, he defined there being multiple "mastodon" species based on locality and size, such as an "Ohio mastodon," a "narrow-toothed mastodon" of Simorre in France, a "small-toothed mastodon" from Mont Blanc near the Italian city of Bologna, and two species of the Americas listed as "mastodon of the Cordilières" and the small-sized "Mastodonte humboldien."

=== Cuvier's taxonomy ===
In 1817, the French naturalist officially established the genus name Mastodon, reaffirming that it is extinct and has left no living descendants. He established that it had an overall body form similar to elephants but had molars more similar to hippopotamuses and pigs that did not serve to grind meat. The first species he erected within Mastodon was Mastodon giganteum, giving it the informal name "great mastodon" and writing that it is designated to the Ohio proboscidean with abundant fossil evidence, equal size but greater proportions to modern elephants, and diamond-shaped points of the molars. The naturalist also created the second species name Mastodon angustidens and gave it the informal name "narrow-toothed mastodon," diagnosing it as having narrower molars, smaller sizes compared to M. giganteum, and range distributions in Europe and South America.

In 1824, after reviewing known "mastodon" fossils from Europe, Cuvier wrote that he recognized six species of the genus Mastodon: the "great mastodon" (M. maximus), "narrow-toothed mastodon" (M. angustidens), "mastodon of the Cordelières" (M. andium), "little mastodon" (M. minutus), and "tapiroid mastodon" (M. tapiroïdes).

Apparently unbeknownst to Cuvier, in 1814, Fischer von Waldheim designated the genus Mastotherium as a genus name to the "mastodons" Cuvier recognized back in 1806. He gave the species Mastotherium megalodon for the "Ohio mastodon," M. leptodon for the "narrow-toothed mastodon," M. microdon for the "small-toothed mastodon," M. hyodon for the "Cordelières mastodon," and M. Humboldtii for the "little mastodon." In addition, Swiss naturalist Heinrich Rudolf Schinz described proboscidean fossil remains and named the species Mastodon turicense in 1824 before Cuvier named it M. tapiroides the same year.

Despite Cuvier's given genus name being a junior synonym of multiple older genus names, Mastodon (sometimes emended to Mastodonte), became the most commonly used genus name for the 19th century. It also saw usage as a common name in the United States by the 19th century.

== European wastebasket history ==
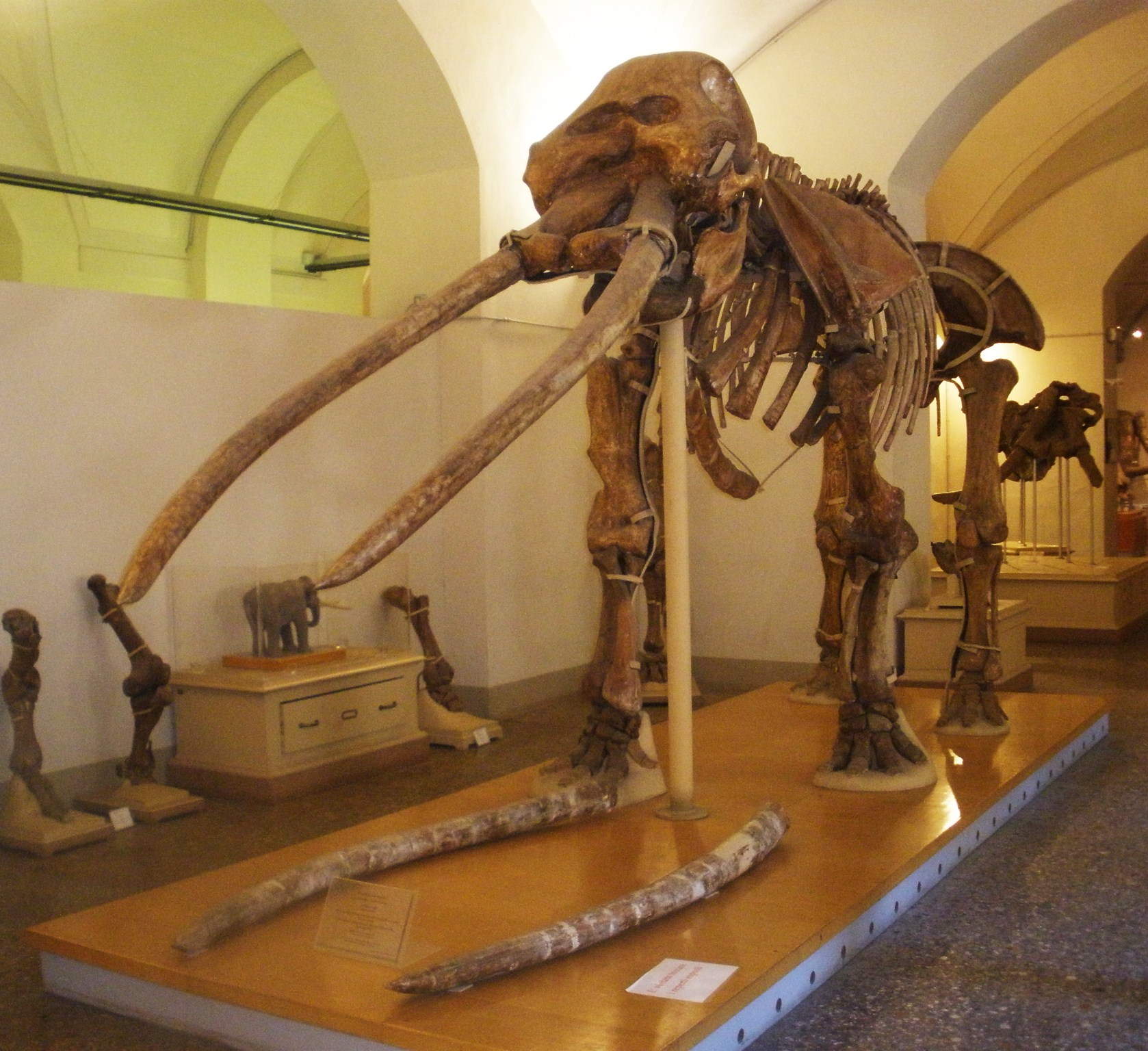
Most fossil proboscidean species described in the 19th century, such as Anancus arvernensis (pictured), were classified to the genus Mastodon

"Mastodon" was riddled with major taxonomic problems since proboscidean species whose dentitions matched neither elephantids nor deinotheres were regularly classified to the genus, effectively making it a wastebasket taxon. In the early taxonomic history of the mammutid genus, species now determined as belonging to other proboscidean genera were classified to Mastodon on the basis of similar dentitions to that of "Mastodon giganteum" (= Mammut americanum). Various fossil proboscidean species from Europe and Asia were classified into Mastodon in the 19th century before eventually being reclassified into distinct genera.

In 1828, British naturalist William Clift wrote about newly erected species collected by John Crawfurd from Southeast Asia. He determined that the species belonged to the genus Mastodon on the basis of similar dentitions to those of M. giganteum and M. angustidens, giving the species names M. latidens and M. elephantoides. The same year, French naturalists Jean-Baptiste Croizet and A. Jobert erected another species Mastodon arvernensis, naming it after the French region Auvergne and giving it the common name "Auvergne mastodon."

In 1832, German naturalist Johann Jakob Kaup established the species Tetracaulodon longirostre, which later was reclassified as Mastodon longirostris. In 1834, American naturalist Isaac Hays established that the proboscidean teeth from Piedmont, Italy, attributed by Italian naturalist Stefano Borson to Mastodon giganteum, belonged to a different species based on dental morphology. He determined that it may have belonged to a different species, giving from Borson the name Mastodon borsoni. The English naturalist Proby Cautley erected an additional species M. Sivalensis in 1836 based on the proportions of a tooth from the Siwalik Hills.

Several genera were erected for European "Mastodon" species, but most 19th century naturalists did not recognize them as distinct. In 1836, German zoologist Hermann Burmeister established the genus Gomphotherium, diagnosing it as an extinct proboscidean with tusks in both jaws, but he did not specify any species that belonged to the genus. Apparently unaware of the prior genus name, Falconer and Cautley established the subgenus name Trilophodon in 1846 for some species of Mastodon. In the same journal in 1847, the species previously referred to Mastodon by Clift were transferred to Elephas by Falconer and Cautley, who also erected the subgenus name Stegodon. Falconer and Cautley also erected another species M. perimensis by 1847. They also established that the teeth assigned to a "M. minutus" were really just teeth of a young M. angustidens, effectively making the former a synonym. Falconer and Cautley also wrote that remains attributed by Cuvier to "M. Humboldtii" can instead be assigned to the other species M. Andium, turning the former species into a synonym. In 1855, Auguste Aymard created the genus name Anancus for the species A. macroplus, which was synonymized by French paleontologist Édouard Lartet with M. arvernensis in 1859. In 1857, Falconer erected the subgenus Tetralophodon for the species M. arvernensis, M. longirostris, and M. sivalensis.

In 1844, British naturalist Richard Owen established an Australian species M. australis based on an inland molar that seemed to resemble those of typical "Mastodon" species rather than other large marsupials like Diprotodon or Nototherium. Along with "Notelephas australis" in 1882, it is possible that proboscidean remains may have been transported by ocean into the Australian mainland, but this explanation fails to explain why the "M. australis" molar, now lost, was found inland. As a result, "M. australis" and "N. australis" remain unresolved enigmas.

In 1856, French paleontologists Jean Albert Gaudry and Lartet erected an Asian species M. pentelicus. German paleontologist Johann Andreas Wagner established another proboscidean species M. atticus in 1857. Lartet later erected another European proboscidean species M. pyrenaicus in 1859. Falconer established the name Mastodon pandionis in 1868 based on fossil molars from India.

In 1877, Michael Vacek pointed out that certain proboscideans had "zygolophodont" dentitions as opposed to more "bunolophodont" dentitions. Establishing differences in dental morphologies for European species, he classified some species like M. tapiroides into the Zygolophodon subgenus and other species like M. angustidens into the Bunolophodon subgenus.

Many Eurasian proboscidean species remained classified to the genus Mastodon for the rest of the 19th century while the other genus names like Trilophodon, Tetralophodon, and Anancus were considered synonyms of Mastodon by Richard Lydekker in 1886. He also established another species M. cautleyi the same year. Lydekker also recognized that M. turiciensis took taxonomic priority over M. tapiroides.

French paleontologist René Fourtau erected two proboscidean species from Wadi Moghara, Egypt named M. spenceri and M. angustidens var. libyca in 1918–1920. Austrian paleontologist Günther Schlesinger erected the subspecies M. augustidens forma subtapiroidea in 1917, and German paleontologist Hans Klähn established the species M. steinheimensis in 1922.

== Early American taxonomic history ==
Throughout the 19th century, the proboscidean taxon was plagued with major taxonomic issues in North America. Many species names erected based on M. americanum remains were erected. As a result, M. americanum has many synonymous names. The issue of synonymous species names were especially apparent in the first half of the 19th century.

In 1830, American naturalist John Davidson Godman created the genus Tetracaulodon plus its species T. Mastodontoideum based on what he determined to be differences between it and Mastodon based on the skull and dentition. Both Richard Harlan and William Cooper pointed out that except for the tusks, all other characteristics of the specimens were consistent with M. giganteum. They therefore argued that there was no reason to assume that the tusks were not just individual variations, a view followed also by George William Featherstonhaugh. Isaac Hays comparatively defended Godman's taxon, which led to a bitter debate regarding the validity of the genus amongst American naturalists.

=== Koch's Missourium ===
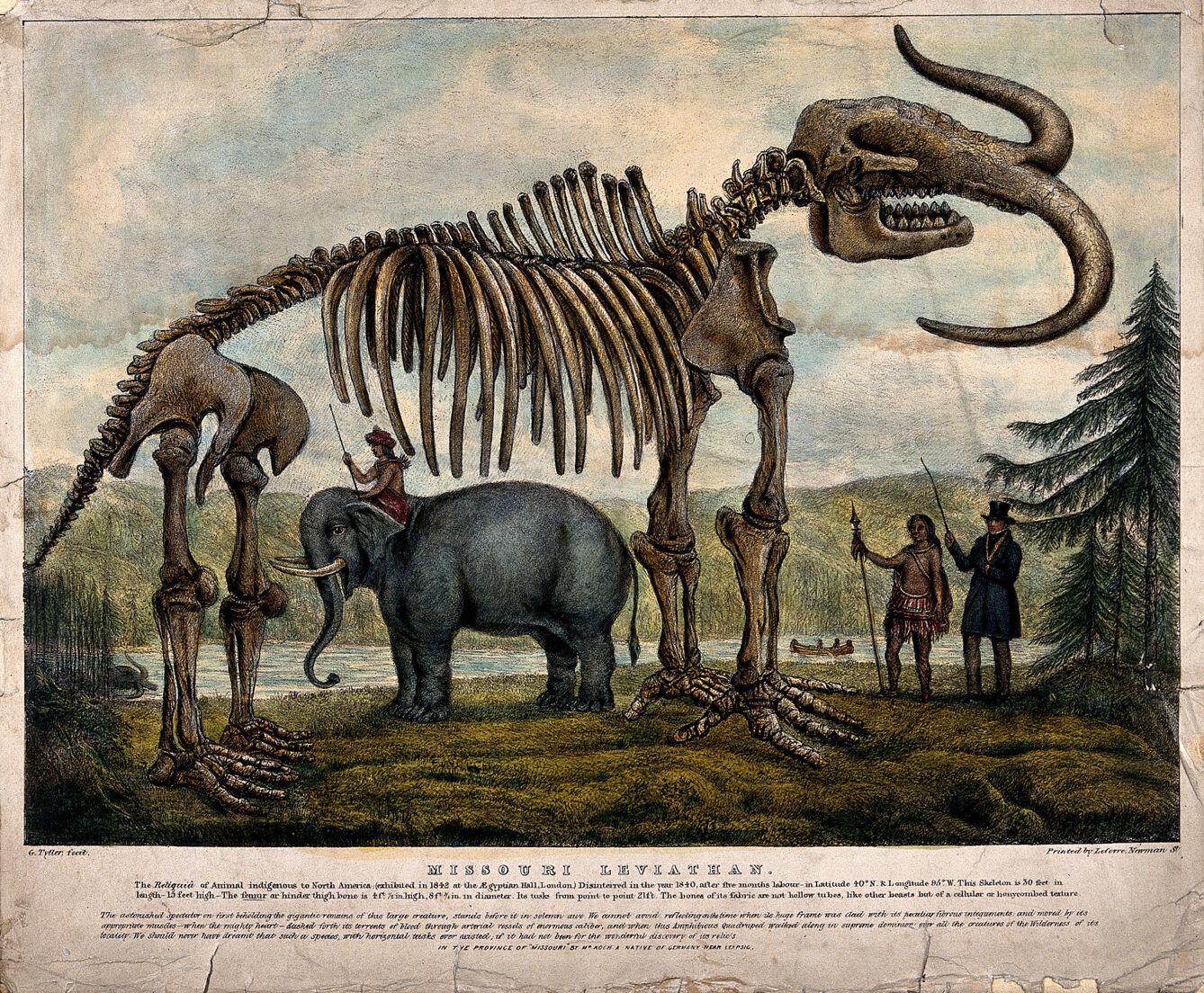
Colored lithograph of the "Missourium" (= Mammut) skeleton, ca. 1845

The history of showman Albert C. Koch and Mammut fossils began as early as the summer of 1838 when he learned from an informant Mr. Wash that a farmer near the Bourbeuse River in Missouri attempted to obtain suitable supplies by improving his spring but accidentally came across a few large-sized bones. The locality of the site as discussed by Koch is not well known in the modern day. Upon seeing the bones in October, he lamented that the bones began to break and deteriorate. He decided to excavate the site, coming across what he thought was a "kill site" of ancient Native Americans having burned a proboscidean. He speculated that the hunters may have had also hurled stones at it to kill it. Possibly, Koch may have also thought that the animal was carnivorous. The showman also found associated remains of stone arrowheads and tomahawks, leading him to believe that the extinct proboscideans and Native Americans coexisted with each other for some time.

Koch's claim that humans and extinct proboscideans were contemporaneous generated controversy amongst other researchers for the next couple of decades. The Native American artifacts were eventually deposited to the Natural History Museum, Berlin, and future studies revealed that the Missouri locality where the artifacts and fossils were found was not an instance of human-extinct megafaunal coexistence. Two explanations for the objects being found at the same locality but not indicating coexistence were Native Americans throwing objects into springs to appease who they believed were residential spirits that sink into ground levels with the fossils and the artifacts themselves being younger than the fossils with ages dating back to the Archaic period (North America).

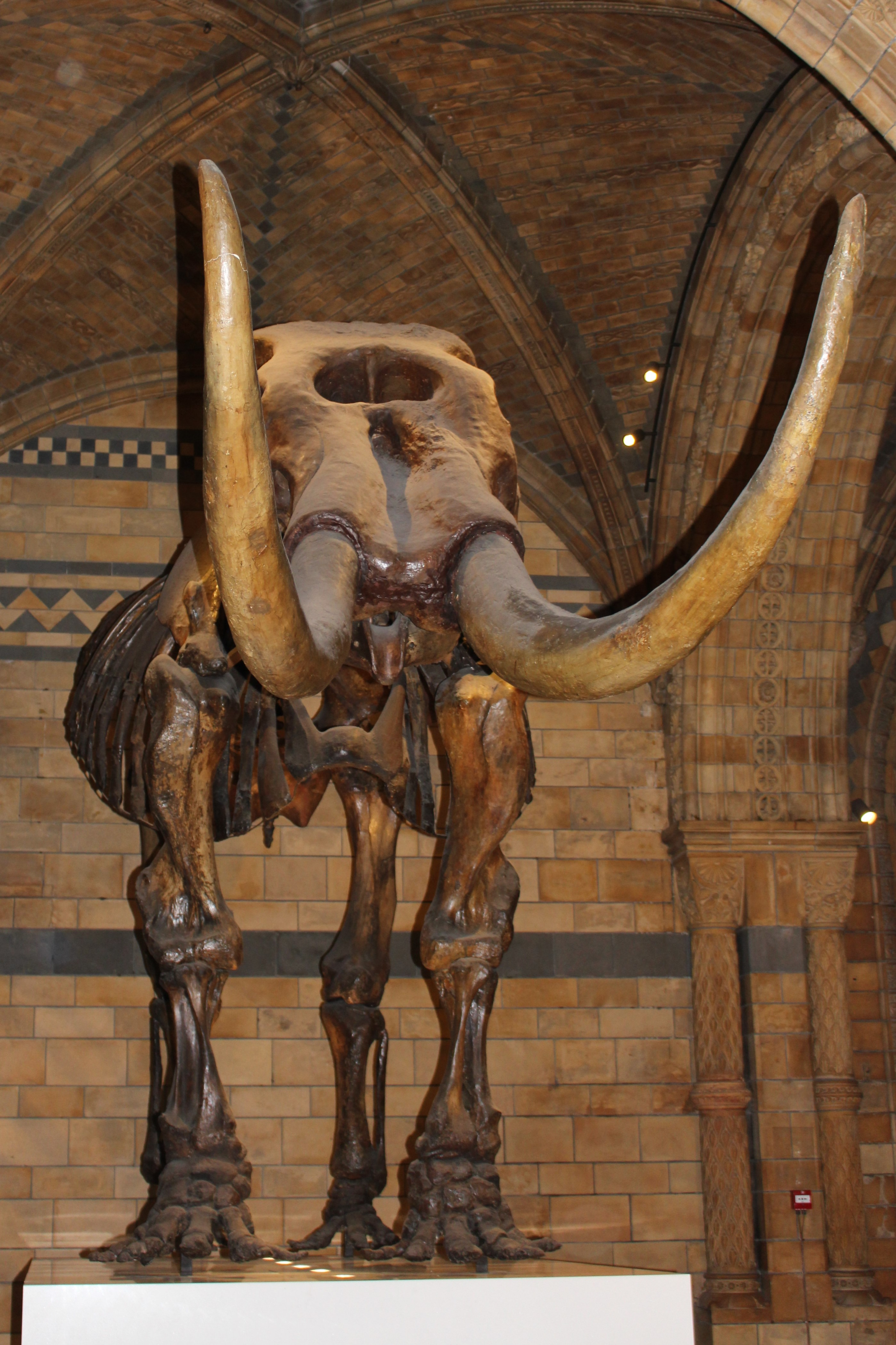
M. americanum skeleton, Natural History Museum, London. The skeleton was initially assembled by Albert C. Koch as "Missourium" or "Leviathan", both now synonymous with Mammut.

Koch announced in the 12 November 1838 edition of the Daily Commercial Bulletin newspaper for St. Louis that he found "mammoth" (M. americanum) fossils from the Bourbeuse River. The next summer in 1839, he traveled a few miles south of St. Louis, Missouri to a salt spring site named Sulphur Springs. The site today is known as Kimmswick and is preserved as the Mastodon State Historic Site. After arriving at the site, he conducted excavations on land belonging to Captain Palmer & Company. He collected mostly fossils belonging to M. americanum and classified one skull as belonging to the newly erected genus plus species Missourium kochii, naming it in honor of the state of Missouri. In his 1840 report, he hypothesized that Missourium was much larger than an elephant, had horizontal tusks plus trunks, and occupied aquatic habitats. He also said that he recovered fossils of Mastodon from the same locality.

The showman later learned about additional fossils recovered from a spring on the Pomme de Terre River in western Missouri by a farmer's laborer. Koch traveled to the site and soon was given permission to dig up the fossils in a three-month project in 1840. He acquired fossils of what he believed were of the "Missourium" or "Missouri Leviathan" (named by 1841) and believed still that it inhabited water banks as proven by the fossils' positions. Koch had enough fossils to assemble a mounted skeleton of the "Missouri Leviathan" and briefly exhibited it at St. Louis. He sold his museum and took the "Missourium" skeleton on a nationwide tour to cities of New Orleans, Louisville, and Philadelphia before going to Europe to exhibit it in London, Great Britain and in Dublin, Ireland. During the exhibition in Philadelphia, Paul Beck Goddard and Harlan determined that the bones actually simply belonged to Mastodon giganteus. In November 1843, he sold the skeleton to the British Museum of Natural History for £1,300, where it was properly reassembled by Owen and resides in the museum to the modern day. Whether Koch knew all along that Missourium was actually just Mastodon is uncertain, but he eventually admitted in 1857 that the synonymy was true.

The validities of both Tetracaulodon and Missourium were rejected by Owen in 1842, although he retained the former name informally. By 1869, American paleontologist Joseph Leidy determined that Mastodon americanus is the senior species synonym and listed M. giganteum as a junior synonym. He also listed Mammut, Harpagmotherium, Mastotherium, Missourium, and Leviathan as synonyms of Mastodon. He also noted that M. americanum as a species was highly variable in morphology.

== Warren Mastodon ==
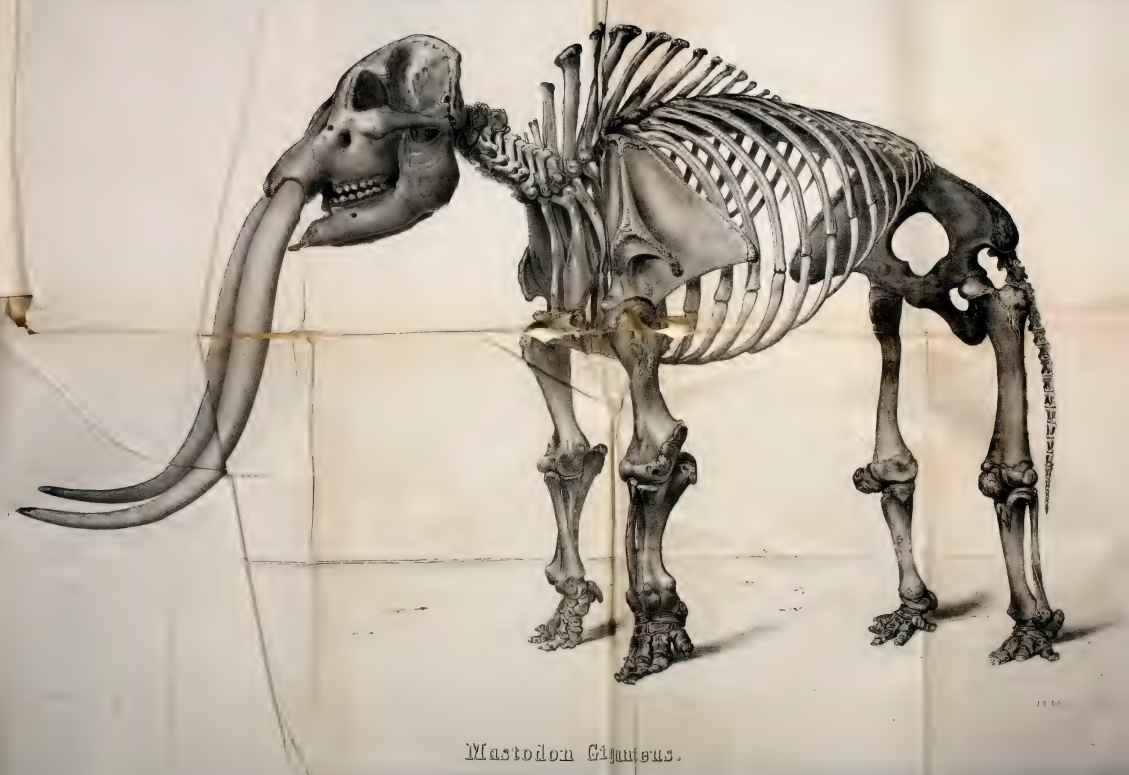
"Mastodon giganteus" (= Mammut americanum) skeleton as depicted in 1852. The individual skeleton is informally named "Warren Mastodon" after John Collins Warren.

4 years after the "Peale's Mastodon" was auctioned off, John Collins Warren wrote about the discovery of a complete skeleton of "M. giganteus" in his monograph The Mastodon Giganteus of North America in 1852. He referenced that previously, it was M. angustidens that was better known despite the earlier history of M. giganteus because well-preserved fossils dating to the Miocene were found in France. He said that M. giganteus differed in geological position from M. angustidens and that remains of the former were recovered from the US states of Kentucky, Mississippi, Missouri, and South Carolina. According to Warren, in a dry summer of 1845 near Newburgh, Nathaniel Brewster employed laborers to remove lacustrine deposits to fertilize the neighboring fields. They dug slightly deep until they accidentally came across a hard object that they were not able to immediately identify. The proprietor's son William C. Brewster, his son-in-law Mr. Weeks, and some assistants came to observe with a large number of other spectators the fossil. The laborers rapidly exhumed the bones, uncovering a 4 ft (1.2 m) long cranium with a distorted lower jaw plus bones of the vertebral column, tail, pelvis, ribs, and tusks in mostly natural positions of being next to each other.

By the end of the 2nd day of labor, they recovered a mostly complete skeleton except for a few components, some of which were recovered later. Unlike previous proboscidean fossils, the skeleton was almost perfectly preserved and was of a brown color rather than a black one. The skeleton, deposited from Nathaniel Brewster's stables, was cleaned and dried then given to physician Dr. Prime, who articulated the remains. The skeleton was exhibited in New York City as well as other New England towns for the next three to four months. The bones afterward came in possession of Warren, who with his friend, physician Nathaniel B. Shurtleff, disarticulated and rearranged the bones for nearly four weeks.

Also of note were the contents that were buried with the skeleton, which composed of a mass substance of crushed branches, which were initially ignored. Warren stated that a few experts like Prime confirmed that they were large portions of vegetative substances such as coniferous tree twigs or shrubs consumed by the individual proboscidean. Therefore, M. giganteus was confirmed outright to be an herbivore according to Warren. He also wrote about apparent evidence of hair of the species previously found in Montgomery, New York and described by other researchers, although he did not elaborate further on his opinions on the matter.

After Warren's death in 1856, under his will, the mammutid skeleton were sent to his family while Warren's bones were delivered to the Harvard Medical School. The medical school later swapped the skeletons with Warren's family. The "Warren mastodon" was kept in a small exhibition room in Harvard University for about half a century. The skeleton was sold to the American financier J. P. Morgan for $30,000 in 1906 and subsequently donated to the American Museum of Natural History after he agreed to fulfill American paleontologist Henry Fairfield Osborn's request to cover the costs on behalf of the museum. Today, the "Warren Mastodon" is at the entrance of the Hall of Mammals exhibit in the natural history museum.

== American wastebasket history ==
In the second half of the 19th century, the wastebasket taxon status of "Mastodon" carried over to North America and South America. This meant that many fossil proboscidean species of the two continents that are now classified to distant genera were lumped into the genus Mastodon at some point. Leidy erected a proboscidean species Mastodon (Tetralophodon) mirificus from the Pliocene deposit of Niobrara, Nebraska in 1858. American paleontologist Edward Drinker Cope established three additional North American proboscidean species three decades later that he lumped into Mastodon: M. proavus in 1873, M. productus in 1874, and M. euhypodon in 1884. Leidy followed up by erecting M. floridanus in 1884. Argentine paleontologist Florentino Ameghino erected multiple South American species that he determined belonged to Mastodon, of which only M. platensis is now valid, in 1888.

In addition to still-valid species names, several synonymous or dubious species names ultimately belonging to different genera were erected within the Americas as well throughout the 19th century.

== 20th century proboscidean revisions ==
=== Proboscidean genus name reviews ===
In 1902, American paleontologist Oliver Perry Hay listed Mammut as the prioritized genus name given its status as the oldest genus name, making Mastodon, Tetracaulodon, and Missourium classified as junior synonyms. He also established M. americanum as the type species. The genus name Mastodon was subsequently abandoned by many American paleontologists in favor of Mammut within the early 20th century such as Theodore Sherman Palmer in 1904, Richard Swann Lull in 1908, and various others. Meanwhile, the term "mastodon" still saw usage as a common name. Osborn in his 1936 monograph expressed his disdain for the genus name Mammut, who recognized the recent usage of the name but considered it to be a "barbaric term" that would "rob Cuvier of his clear conception of grinding tooth structure" and be "gross injustice to the founder of vertebrate palæontology." He suggested that taxonomic priority of Mammut be disregarded in favor of the at-the-time popular Mastodon on the basis of his opinion that Cuvier's name is more fitting.

Osborn in his long time of specialization on fossil proboscideans favored many genus names (most of which were erected by other paleontologists) that most species formerly classified to Mastodon/Mammut have since been reclassified to, such as Anancus, Trilophodon (= Gomphotherium), Zygolophodon, Rhynchotherium, Cuvieronius, Stegomastodon, Notiomastodon, Stegolophodon, and Choerolophodon. As a result of the revisions, he favored only one species classified in Mastodon, M. americanus. The amebelodont Stenobelodon is the only genus erected after the early 20th century proboscidean taxonomic revisions to now include a species formerly assigned to Mastodon. The proboscidean genera outside of Mammut had their own complicated taxonomic revisions until most species lumped into the Mastodon wastebin eventually had solidified taxonomic affinities to the modern day. Today, the genera that include species formerly classified into Mastodon include Gomphotherium (G. angustidens, G. pyrenaicum, G. productum, G. libycum, G. subtapiroideum, G. steinheimense), Zygolophodon (Z. turicensis, Z. proavus), Cuvieronius (C. hyodon), Stegodon (S. elephantoides), Stegolophodon (S. latidens, S. cautleyi), Anancus (A. avernensis, A. sivalensis, A. perimensis), Tetralophodon (T. longirostris), Choerolophodon (C. pentelici), Stegomastodon (S. mirificus), Rhynchotherium ("R." euhypodon), Stenobelodon (S. floridanus), and Notiomastodon (N. platensis).

The genus name Mammut went under review from Simpson in 1942. The paleontologist stated that although people had recognized the technical validity of it based on its senior synonym status, they generally refused to use it because they felt that it perpetuated historic confusion between Mammut americanum and Mammuthus primigenius. Simpson argued that usage of the genus name could be justified beyond technicalities because "mammoth" as defined previously by Rembrandt Peale meant "large and legendary animal" and was the primary term used for M. americanum at the time. He said that for his study, he prioritized the historic plus taxonomically correct name Mammut over Mastodon. He continued prioritizing Mammut in 1945, stating that people were generally aware of its taxonomic priorities over Mastodon and that people had refused to use it. He stated that he did not want to either but reluctantly set aside his personal preferences to follow taxonomic rules.

=== New Mammut species ===
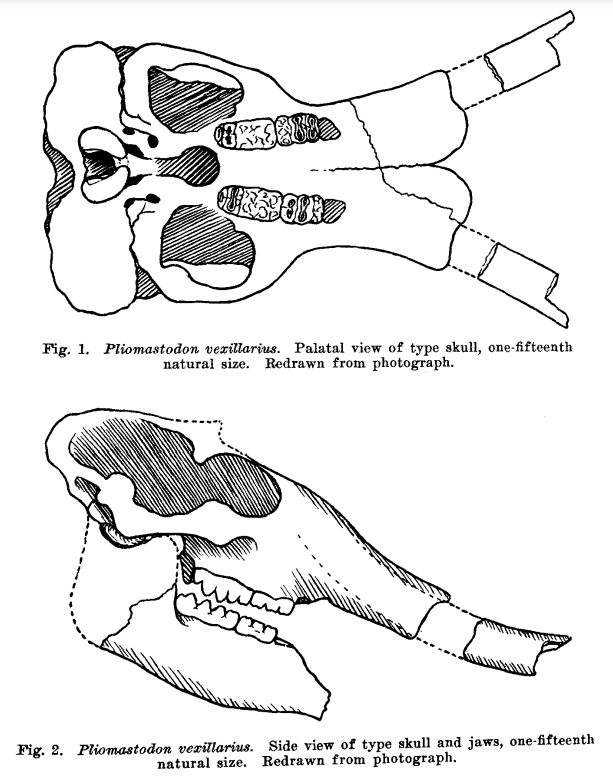
Sketch of the reconstructed skull of "Pliomastodon vexillarius" (= Mammut vexillarius), 1930

The 20th century still involved the creations of species names that eventually became synonymous with M. americanum. In 1914, Oliver Hay erected the Pleistocene species Mammut progenium based on fossils from Iowa. Hay erected two additional Pleistocene-aged species Mammut francisi and Mammut oregonense in 1926 based on dental materials from Texas and Oregon, respectively. In 1931, Erwin Hinckley Barbour erected a newer Pleistocene species Mastodon moodiei from Nebraska. Mammut progenium and Mastodon moodiei were both eventually synonymized with M. americanum while M. oregonense was rendered a nomen dubium. "M." francisi was reclassified to Rhynchotherium by 1936, but the name may be dubious because it is based on isolated dental material.

Other North American proboscidean species now classified to Mammut were erected during the rigorous proboscidean revisions. In 1921, Osborn created the species name Mastodon matthewi based on distinct molars from the Snake Creek Formation of western Nebraska, naming it in honor of William Diller Matthew. He also erected another species M. merriami from the Thousand Creek Formation in Nevada, which was eventually synonymized with Zygolophodon proavus. Osborn in 1926 followed up for Mastodon matthewi by establishing the genus Pliomastodon for the species based on cranial differences from "Miomastodon" (= Zygolophodon).

In 1930, Matthew erected a second species for Pliomastodon named P. vexillarius based on fossil material from the locality of Elephant Hill in California, determining that it differs from Mammut by differences in the skull and that the etymology of the species name was made in honor of paleontological contributions by the Standard Oil Company of California.

The same year, American paleontologist George Gaylord Simpson named another proboscidean species Pliomastodon sellardsi, stating that its specimens were recovered from the Pliocene of the Bone Valley Formation of Brewster, Florida. He diagnosed it based on cranial and dental differences from other mammutid species and stated that it was close in affinity to P. matthewi.

In 1933, Childs Frick named the species Mastodon raki from the locality of Truth or Consequences, New Mexico based on differences on the heel and M_{3} tooth from M. americanus, otherwise having proportions similar to it. He did not specify the etymology of the species name.

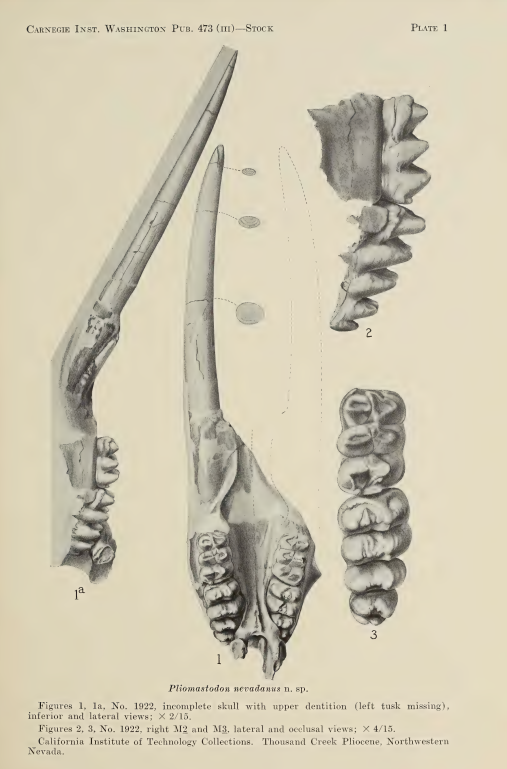
"Pliomastodon nevadanus" (= Mammut nevadanum skull and dental material as drawn in 1936

In 1936, Chester Stock published the species name Pliomastodon nevadanus based on fossils from the Thousand Creek Beds of northwestern Nevada although he deemed the available material to be unsatisfactory.

In 1937, John R. Schultz created the species name Pliomastodon? cosoensis, naming it after the Coso Mountains in Inyo County, California where skull fossils were recovered. He thought that it could be possible to refer it to a new genus intermediate between Pliomastodon and Mastodon but instead tentatively kept it in Pliomastodon because he thought there was too little room for a new one. He stated that if it truly was a species of Pliomastodon, then it was the most advanced one of the genus.

In 1944, Claude W. Hibbard diagnosed material from the Ogallala Formation of Seward County, Kansas as belonging to the new species P. adamsi, diagnosing it in part as being the largest known species of Pliomastodon based on the upper dentition. The species name was based on the Adams family from a ranch who cooperated with the paleontologist to make his paleontological work successful.

In 1963, J. Arnold Shotwell and Donald E. Russell created another species Mammut (Pliomastodon) furlongi, assigning it to fossils collected from the Juntura Formation of Oregon. The species name was created in honor of Eustace L. Furlong, who made early fossil collections from the western side of the Juntura Basin.

The genus Pliomastodon was synonymized with Mammut while Miomastodon was synonymized with Zygolophodon by Jeheskel Shoshani and Pascal Tassy in a 1996 appendix, a view that was followed by other authors in later years.

In 2019, Alton C. Dooley Jr. et al. established Mammut pacificus based on fossils collected from the Diamond Valley Lake in Hemet, California. They also stated that M. oregonense is a nomen dubium and that further analysis needs to be done to confirm whether or not M. furlongi belongs to Zygolophodon instead.

In 2023, Wighart von Koenigswald et al. reviewed the North American species of Zygolophodon and Mammut. They synonymized P. adamsi and P. sellardsi with Mammut matthewi and emended M. nevadanus and M. pacificus to M. nevadanum and M. pacificum, respectively. They also said that they were uncertain of the taxonomic status of M. furlongi, specifically whether or not it was a variant of sexual dimorphism of Z. proavus.

=== Species pending reassessment ===
Although a majority of species formerly placed in "Mastodon"/Mammut have since been reclassified, a few other proboscidean species are still currently assigned to Mammut that are pending reassessments. The oldest-described species pending reassessment within Mammut is "Mammut" borsoni, which is known in Eurasia from at least MN15 (late Miocene) until MN17 (early Pleistocene) of the Mammal Neogene zones. "M." obliquelophus is another valid species of mammutid from Eurasia, first erected in 1980 by B.B. Mucha. "M." praetypicum, first erected in 1919, may be a synonym of "M." obliquelophus, although whether this is true remains uncertain.

Several mammutid species from the Neogene of China are also assigned to Mammut or its junior synonym "Pliomastodon". One species referenced by several Chinese academic sources is Pliomastodon? zhupengensis, which was erected in 1991 by Zhang et al. in 1991 and is said to have been similar in incisor and mandibular development to M. matthewi. Two other species are also referenced in literature, M. shansiense (named by Chow and Chang in 1961) and M. lufugense (erected by Zhang in 1982), the former of which some authors have argued is probably a synonym of "M." borsoni and the latter of which has ambiguous taxonomic validity. The synonymization of all Chinese "Mammut" species to "M." borsoni was first proposed by Heinz Tobien and coauthors in 1988, who argued that dental morphology alone (without additional cranial specimens available for study) could not sufficiently define "M." shansiense from "M." borsoni. In 2026, Xiao-Xiao Zhang and colleagues revived the name M. shansiense based on a cranium and suggested that it was an evolutionarily derived mammutid species that likely shared a close common ancestor with the North American species of Mammut.
