= Boone Creek =

Boone Creek may refer to:

== Waterways ==
- Boone Creek (Big Piney River tributary), a stream in Texas County, Missouri, United States
- Boone Creek (Bourbeuse River tributary), a stream in Crawford, Franklin, and Gasconade Counties, Missouri, United States
- Boone Creek (Idaho), a river in Idaho
- Boone Creek, North Carolina, a tributary of the South Fork New River
- Boone Creek (Illinois), a tributary of the Fox River (Illinois River tributary) in McHenry County, Illinois

== Other ==
- Boone Creek (band), a band with members of New South (band)

== See also ==
- Boones Creek, Tennessee, a neighborhood
