= Boone Creek (Bourbeuse River tributary) =

Stream in the U.S state of Missouri

Boone Creek (sometimes called Boones Creek) is a stream in the U.S. state of Missouri. It is a tributary of the Bourbeuse River. It runs through Crawford and Franklin Counties.

The stream headwaters are in Crawford County just north of the community of Coffeyton at 38°07′43″N 91°16′19″W. The stream flows north passing under Interstate 44 and then northeast past Bourbon then turns north and enters Franklin County. The stream flows north-northwest passing between Japan and Elmont to enter a meander on the Bourbeuse between Strain and Champion City at 38°18′02″N 91°17′20″W.

Boone Creek bears the name of frontiersman Daniel Boone.

== See also ==
- List of rivers of Missouri
