= Dan Branch (Bourbeuse River tributary) =

Stream in the American state of Missouri

Coordinates: 38.2639365°N 91.3832085°W

Dan Branch is a stream in Gasconade County in the U.S. state of Missouri. It is a tributary of the Bourbeuse River.

Dan Branch most likely derives its name from frontiersman Daniel Boone.

== See also ==
- List of rivers of Missouri
