= Bowen Creek =

Bowen Creek may refer to one of the following places in the United States:

- Bowen Creek (Bourbeuse River tributary), a stream in Missouri
- Bowen Creek (Montana), a stream in Montana
