= Dry Fork (Bourbeuse River tributary) =

Stream in the American state of Missouri

Coordinates: 38°15′42″N 91°25′58″W

Dry Fork is a stream in Gasconade and Maries counties in the U.S. state of Missouri. It is a tributary of the Bourbeuse River.

Dry Fork was named for its tendency to run dry.

== See also ==
- List of rivers of Missouri
