= Clates Creek =

Stream in the American state of Missouri

Clates Creek is a stream in Franklin County in the U.S. state of Missouri. It is a tributary of the Bourbeuse River.

The stream headwaters arise at 38°21′26″N 91°18′12″W and it flows to the south-southwest to its confluence with the Bourbeuse is at 38°19′09″N 91°19′43″W.

Clates Creek has the name of a pioneer citizen.

== See also ==
- List of rivers of Missouri
