= Boone Township, Crawford County, Missouri =

Inactive township in the US state of Missouri

Coordinates: 38.1621858°N 91.2004236°W

Boone Township is an inactive township in Crawford County, in the U.S. state of Missouri.

Boone Township was established in 1848, most likely taking its name from Boone Creek.
