= Champion City, Missouri =

Unincorporated community in Missouri, U.S.

Coordinates: 38°19′10″N 91°16′14″W

Champion City is an unincorporated community in southwest Franklin County in the U.S. state of Missouri.

The community sits on a bluff above the north bank of the Bourbeuse River along Missouri Route CC. The Champion City church and cemetery are approximately one mile to the southwest and the community of Spring Bluff is two miles to the southeast. Sullivan is nine miles to the southeast and Gerald lies six miles to the northwest.

== History ==
A post office called Champion City was established in 1877 and remained in operation until 1911. The community took its name from the local Champion Flour Mill.
