= Bowen Creek (Bourbeuse River tributary) =

Stream in the U.S. state of Missouri

Bowen Creek is a stream in Phelps, Crawford and Gasconade counties in the U.S. state of Missouri. It is a tributary of Bourbeuse River.

The stream headwaters arises in Crawford County adjacent to the Crawford-Phelps county line at 38°05′39″N 91°31′30″W and the stream flows north along and crossing the county line several times before crossing into Gasconade County to its confluence with the Bourbeuse River at 38°09′59″N 91°32′28″W. The confluence is 1.5 mile west of Jake Prairie and two miles southeast of Redbird.

Bowen Creek has the name of Colonel Isaiah Bowen, the proprietor of a local watermill.
