= Strain, Missouri =

Unincorporated community in Missouri, U.S.

Coordinates: 38°17′30″N 91°18′11″W

Strain is an unincorporated community in Franklin County, in the U.S. state of Missouri.

== History ==
A post office called Strain was established in 1903, and remained in operation until 1910. The community has the name of John M. Strain, an early settler.
