= Roth Creek =

Stream in the American state of Missouri

Coordinates: 38.417273°N 91.042366°W

Roth Creek (also known as Bachelor Creek) is a stream in Franklin County in the U.S. state of Missouri.

Roth Creek was named after a local landowner.

== See also ==
- List of rivers of Missouri
