= Boone Creek (Big Piney River tributary) =

Stream in the U.S. state of Missouri

Coordinates: 37°29′26″N 91°58′22″W

Boone Creek is a stream in Texas County in the U.S. state of Missouri. It is a tributary of the Big Piney River.

The stream headwaters are at and the confluence with the Big Piney is at . The stream source is about three miles south of Licking. The stream flows west-northwest and passes under Missouri Route 137 and U. S. Route 63 to join the Big Piney about eight miles from its source just south of Missouri Route 32.

Boone Creek has the name of Daniel Boone, frontiersman.

== See also ==
- List of rivers of Missouri
