= Red Oak Creek (Missouri) =

Stream in the American state of Missouri

Red Oak Creek is a stream in Gasconade and Franklin counties of Missouri. It is a tributary of the Bourbeuse River.

The stream headwaters are in Gasconade County at 38°18′30″N 91°32′53″W and the confluence with the Bourbeuse River is in Franklin County at 38°19′04″N 91°20′01″W.

Red Oak Creek was named for the red oak timber lining its course.

== See also ==
- List of rivers of Missouri
