= Spring Bluff, Missouri =

- Unincorporated community
- Location within Missouri
- Coordinates: 38°17′44″N 91°14′17″W
- Country: United States
- State: Missouri
- County: Franklin
- Elevation: 909 ft (277 m)
- Time zone: UTC-6 (Central (CST))
  - Summer (DST): UTC-5 (CDT)
- Area code: 573
- GNIS feature ID: 741277

Spring Bluff is an unincorporated community in southwest Franklin County, Missouri, United States.

The community sits on a ridge at the intersection of Missouri routes 185 and AC approximately seven miles northwest of Sullivan. An incised meander of the Bourbeuse River lies one mile northwest of the community.

== History ==
A post office called Springbluff was established in 1872, and remained in operation until 1933. The community most likely was so named on account of its lofty elevation above a spring.

== Education ==
Spring Bluff R-XV School District is a public school district that includes kindergarten through eighth grades. It received the "Distinction in Performance" award from 2001-2002 to 2011–2012.
