= Brush Creek Township, Gasconade County, Missouri =

Township in the American state of Missouri

Coordinates: 38.2606°N 91.4586°W

Brush Creek Township is an inactive township in Gasconade County, in the U.S. state of Missouri.

Brush Creek Township was established in 1858, most likely taking its name Brush Creek.
