= John Davidson Godman =

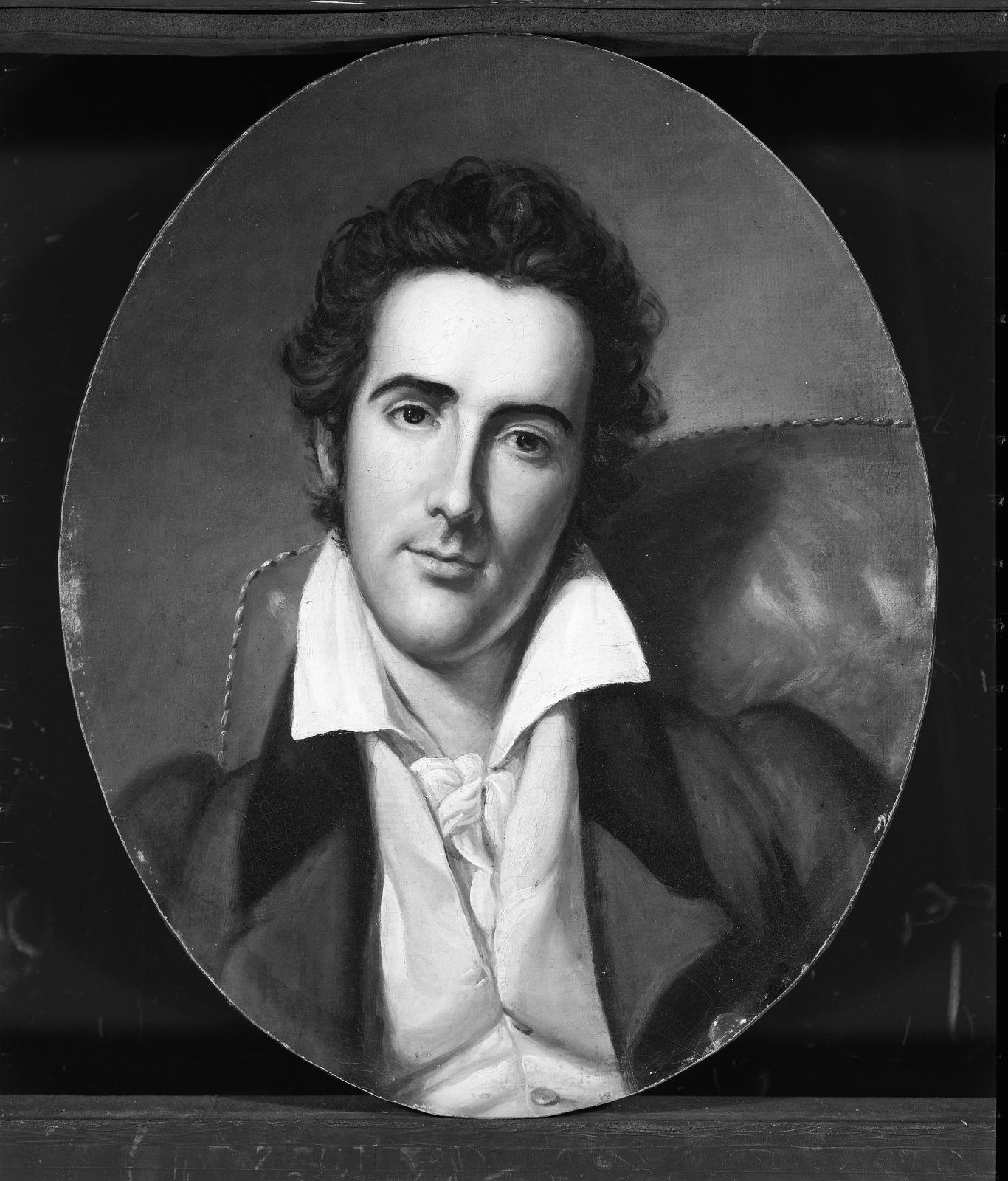
Photograph of a portrait by Rembrandt Peale

John Davidson Godman (20 December 1794 – 17 April 1830) was an American medical doctor and naturalist. He taught anatomy at a number of early American medical institutions including at Philadelphia (the precursor to the Philadelphia School of Anatomy), Ohio and Cincinnati while also writing on a range of topics. He described several fossil species.

Godman was born in Anne Arundel County, Maryland to Samuel and Anna née Henderson. After losing both his parents in 1805, he was raised by an aunt in Wilmington, Delaware. After the death of the aunt, he lived with an older sister Stella Miller at Baltimore. He apprenticed at a local printer and came to meet Dr William Luckey who worked with Dr Thomas E Bond. Godman enlisted as a sailor and served under Commodore Joshua Barney in Chesapeake Bay in 1814–15. When he returned he was offered a job by Dr Luckey at Elizabethtown, Pennsylvania. Here Godman began to study books and read what most students read in a year in six weeks. In 1816 he moved to Baltimore and attended lectures at the University of Maryland and became a demonstrator for Dr John Beale Davidge. In 1817 Dr Davidge was injured and Godman was asked to take classes. In 1818 he received a degree and moved to New Holland, Maryland and then to his hometown to practice medicine. He spent his spare time in natural history and wrote Rambles of a Naturalist (1833). In 1819 he hoped to receive a position vacated by William Gibson but he was considered too young for the post and he moved to teach in Philadelphia. In 1821 he received a position at the Medical College of Ohio under Dr Daniel Drake. He married Angelica Kauffman, daughter of Rembrandt Peale and the couple moved to Cincinnati. In 1822 he resigned shortly after Dr Drake's own resignation. He stayed on in Cincinnati and worked at the local museum, and began to write to journals. Using his knowledge of European languages, he translated several works into English. He also worked on comparative anatomy and examined the bones of several fossil species and described several new species. In 1824 he began to lecture on natural history at the Franklin Institute. He joined Rutgers Medical College to teach anatomy in 1826 but resigned after a year due to ill health. Dr Luckey had suggested that he had hypertrophy of the heart. Godman went to the West Indies in 1828 for health and died two years later.
