= Elmont, Missouri =

Unincorporated community in Missouri, U.S.

Coordinates: 38°14′08″N 91°14′34″W

Elmont is an unincorporated community in Franklin County, in the U.S. state of Missouri.

== History ==
A post office called Elmont was established in 1887, and remained in operation until 1938. The name Elmont is a transfer from another American town of the same name, as a town founder selected the name randomly from a postal directory.
