= Japan, Missouri =

Unincorporated community in Franklin County, in the U.S. state of Missouri

Coordinates: 38°14′21″N 91°18′22″W

Japan (pronounced /ˈdʒeɪpæn/ JAY-pan or /ˈdʒeɪpən/ JAY-pən) is an unincorporated community in southwest Franklin County, in the U.S. state of Missouri. The community is located on Missouri Route AE 7.5 mile west-northwest of Sullivan.

== History ==
A post office called Japan was established in 1860, and remained in operation until 1908. The community was named after a local Roman Catholic Church, the Church of the Holy Martyrs of Japan. The name was almost changed in the aftermath of the attack on Pearl Harbor due to anti-Japanese sentiment in the United States.
