= Bourbeuse River =

River in Missouri, U.S.

The Bourbeuse River (/ˈbɜːrbɪs/ BUR-biss or /ˈbɜːrbʌs/ BUR-buss) French for 'muddy') is a river located in east-central Missouri, in the Ozarks region, and is one of two major tributaries of the Meramec River, the other being the Big River. The Bourbeuse flows to the northeast from its source (37°58′42″N 91°43′03″W) near the locale of Dillon just northeast of Rolla in Phelps County, through Maries, Gasconade, Crawford, and Franklin counties, where it discharges into the Meramec River near Moselle (38°23′57″N 90°53′21″W). The elevation of the river at its source is approximately 1,140 feet (350 m) above sea level and at its mouth about 463 feet (141 m). The total length of the river is 154 miles (248 km), while the airline distance between source and mouth is 53 miles (85 km). The watershed area is 842.9 square miles (2,183 km^{2}).

Tributaries of the Bourbeuse River include Boone Creek, Bowen Creek, Brush Creek, Dry Fork, Little Bourbeuse River, Roth Creek, Red Oak Creek, Spring Creek and Voss Creek.

The USGS stream gauge in Union, near the mouth of the river, measures an average flow of 692 cubic feet (19.6 m^{3}) per second.

== See also ==
- List of Missouri rivers
