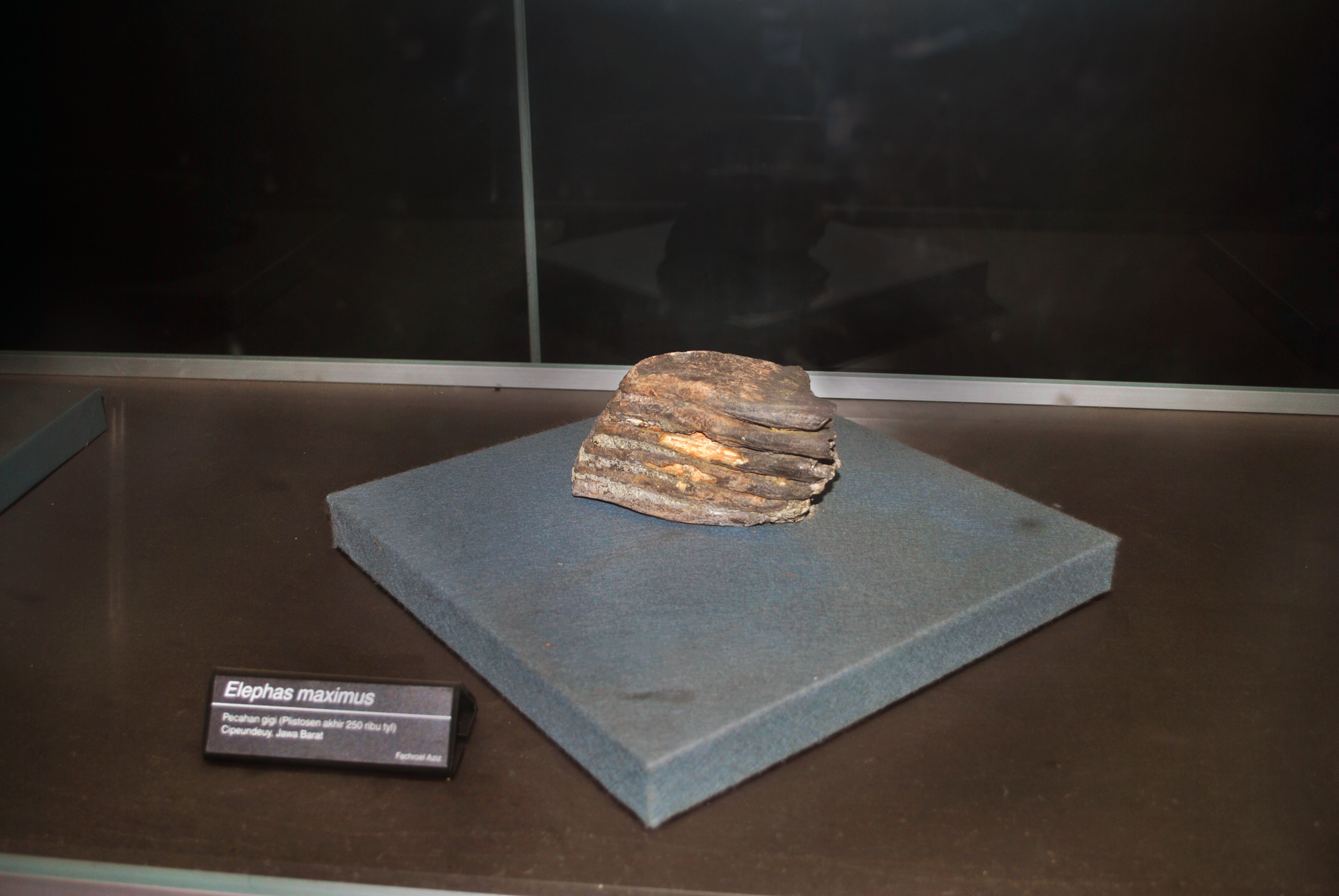
- Partial fossil tooth of an Asian elephant collected in Cipeundeuy, West Bandung Regency, West Java, possibly of a Javan elephant

Scientific classification
- Kingdom: Animalia
- Phylum: Chordata
- Class: Mammalia
- Order: Proboscidea
- Family: Elephantidae
- Genus: Elephas
- Species: E. maximus
- Subspecies: E. m. sondaicus

Trinomial name
- Elephas maximus sondaicus Deraniyagala, 1953

= Javan elephant =

Subspecies of mammal

The Javan elephant (Elephas maximus sondaicus) was proposed by Paules Edward Pieris Deraniyagala in 1953, based on an illustration of a carving on the Buddhist monument of Borobudur in Java. He thought that the Asian elephant (Elephas maximus) had indeed existed on the island and had gone extinct. It may be considered synonymous with the Sumatran elephant (E. maximus sumatranus).

Fossils of the Asian elephant have been found in Pleistocene deposits on Java. The question of when elephants became extinct in Java is unsettled. Chinese chronicles contemporary with the period of Hindu influence in Java recorded that Javan kings rode on elephants, and that Java exported ivory to China. As elephants were, at least occasionally, transported by ship, the elephants in Java during the period of Hindu influence may have been imported from India.

== See also ==
- Asian elephant
  - Borneo elephant
  - Indian elephant
  - Sri Lankan elephant
  - Sumatran elephant
  - Syrian elephant
- Elephas hysudrindicus
