= Elephas beyeri =

Elephas beyeri Temporal range: Middle Pleistocene
- Photographs of the now lost holotype and only known specimen, viewed from above (top) and from the side (below)

Scientific classification
- Kingdom: Animalia
- Phylum: Chordata
- Class: Mammalia
- Order: Proboscidea
- Family: Elephantidae
- Genus: Elephas
- Species: †E. beyeri

Binomial name
- †Elephas beyeri von Koenigwald, 1956

Extinct species of elephant

Elephas beyeri is an extinct species of elephantid known from the Middle Pleistocene of the Philippines. It was named after the anthropologist H. Otley Beyer. The type and only known specimen, a partial cheek tooth, was discovered on Cabarruyan Island off the coast of Luzon, but has since been lost.

== Description ==
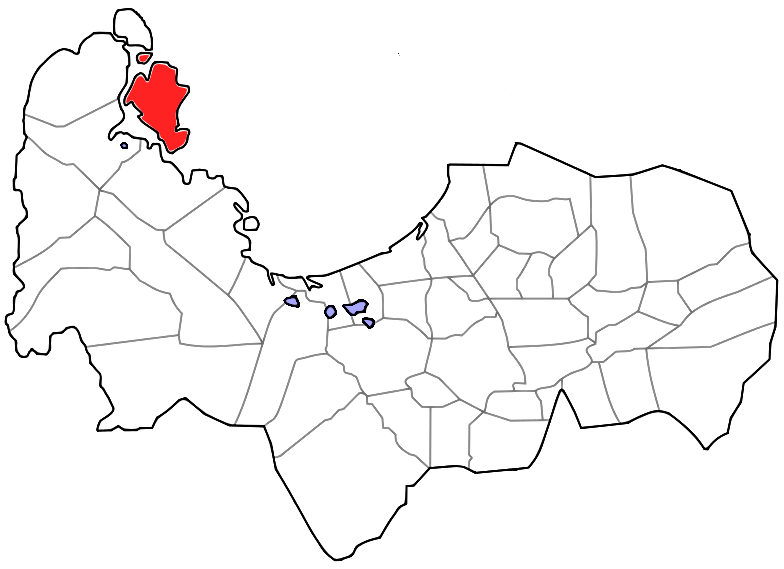
Map of the fossil site; Cabarruyan (Anda) island, Pangasinan in highlight.

The type specimen of the species is a partial cheek tooth from the lower jaw that has since been lost. It has often been suggested that Elephas beyeri was a dwarf elephant with an estimated stature of 1.2 metres (3.9 ft) in shoulder height, based on the assumption that the tooth represents a molar. However, a 2025 conference abstract suggested that the tooth may represent a deciduous fourth premolar instead, which if true would place the idea that E. beyeri represents a dwarf elephant into doubt.

== Taxonomy ==
During its naming, von Koenigswald proposed that E. beyeri was descended from Elephas namadicus (now generally placed in Palaeoloxodon). It was thought by von Koenigswald that these animals crossed from the mainland Asia to the Philippines via land bridge connecting with Taiwan. This, however, is still debated but a study in 2021 showed an evidence of the possibility. Aside from the missing initial specimen, more elephantid remains were unearthed in 2001 in the same locality. Further elephant remains were found in the Visayas and at a number of sites in Luzon, particularly the Cagayan Valley region in the northern part of the island. But it is unclear if these belonged to E. beyeri or P. namadicus due to their fragmented nature and the missing holotype. It might be even argued that the Visayan fossils were different from the elephant species harbored in Greater Luzon. A 2025 conference abstract found that based on analysis of archival data, the holotype and only undoubted E. beyeri specimen does not have any synapomorphies of Palaeoloxodon, and suggested that it could potentially have mammoth affinities instead due to its tooth morphology resembling those of mammoths, but the authors advised against reclassifying the species, given the loss of the holotype specimen. The authors suggested that other remains of elephants found on Luzon and surrounding islands (with Elephas remains from the Cayagan Valley on Luzon dating between 834,000 ± 80,000 and 623,000 ± 45,000 years ago) could probably be relatively confidently placed in Elephas, the genus of the living Asian elephant, and belonged to relatively large animals with cheek teeth roughly equivalent in size to Asian elephants, rather than to strongly dwarfed elephants.
