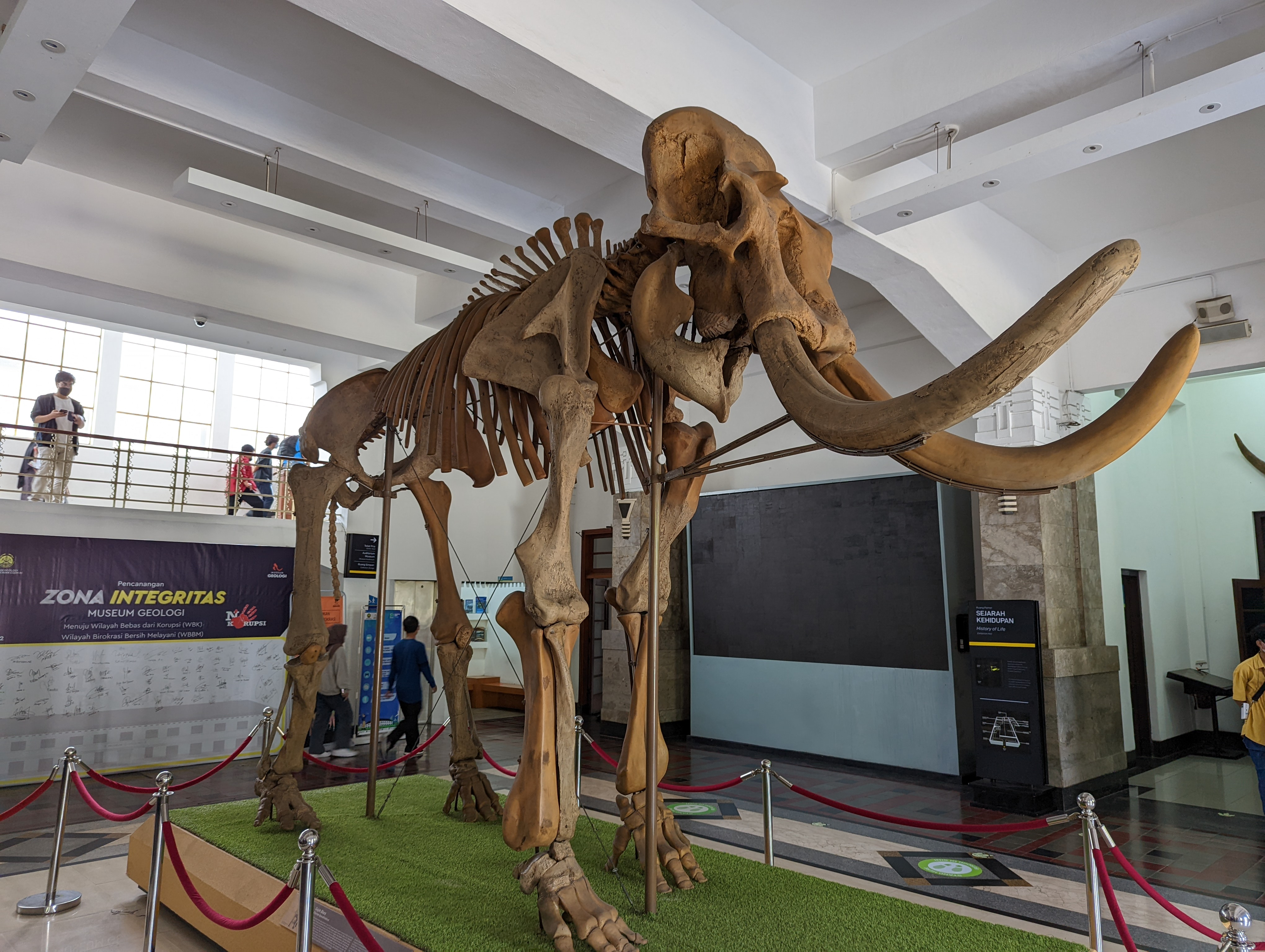
- Elephas hysudrindicus in the Bandung Geological Museum

Scientific classification
- Kingdom: Animalia
- Phylum: Chordata
- Class: Mammalia
- Order: Proboscidea
- Family: Elephantidae
- Genus: Elephas
- Species: †E. hysudrindicus

Binomial name
- †Elephas hysudrindicus Dubois, 1908
- Sunggun Archaeological Site in Blora, Java

= Elephas hysudrindicus =

Elephas hysudrindicus Temporal range: Pleistocene

Extinct species of mammal

Elephas hysudrindicus, commonly known also as the Blora elephant in Indonesia (lit. Gajah Blora in Indonesian), is a species of extinct elephant from the Pleistocene of Java. It is anatomically distinct from the Asian elephant, the last remaining species of elephant under the genus Elephas. The species existed from around the end of the Early Pleistocene until the end of the Middle Pleistocene, when it was replaced by the modern Asian elephant in Java. It coexisted with the fellow proboscidean Stegodon trigonocephalus, as well as archaic humans belonging to the species Homo erectus.

== Taxonomy ==
When Eugène Dubois described the species in 1908, he failed to designate a holotype specimen. In 2017, the partial skull RGM.DUB 4968–4969 in the collections of the Naturalis Biodiversity Center, Leiden was designated the lectotype. It was excavated in Tinggang, Bojonegoro, and was Dubois' original fossil material. It is considered to be closely related to the extinct Elephas hysudricus of mainland Asia, which it is possibly descended from.

A fossil was excavated from Sunggun archaeological site, Medalem, Kradenan Subregency, Blora in March 2009. It was excavated 13 kilometres west of the original Tinggang site and was found almost completely intact (estimating about 90%), about a few feet under the dirt in a former sand quarry in the village. Both the skull and mandible were found to possess complete grinding molars, indicating that the individual was an adult specimen by time of death. It was then brought to the Bandung Geological Museum which was then put to display.

== Ecology ==
Isotopic analysis suggests a primarily C4 grazing dominated diet, similar to that inferred for Stegodon trigonocephalus, suggesting that they occupied open habitats on the island.

== See also ==
- Elephas hysudricus
- Javan elephant
- Ngandong tiger
- Bubalus palaeokerabau
- Bos palaesondaicus
