= Tesso Nilo National Park =

National park in Riau Province, Sumatra, Indonesia

- IUCN category II (national park)
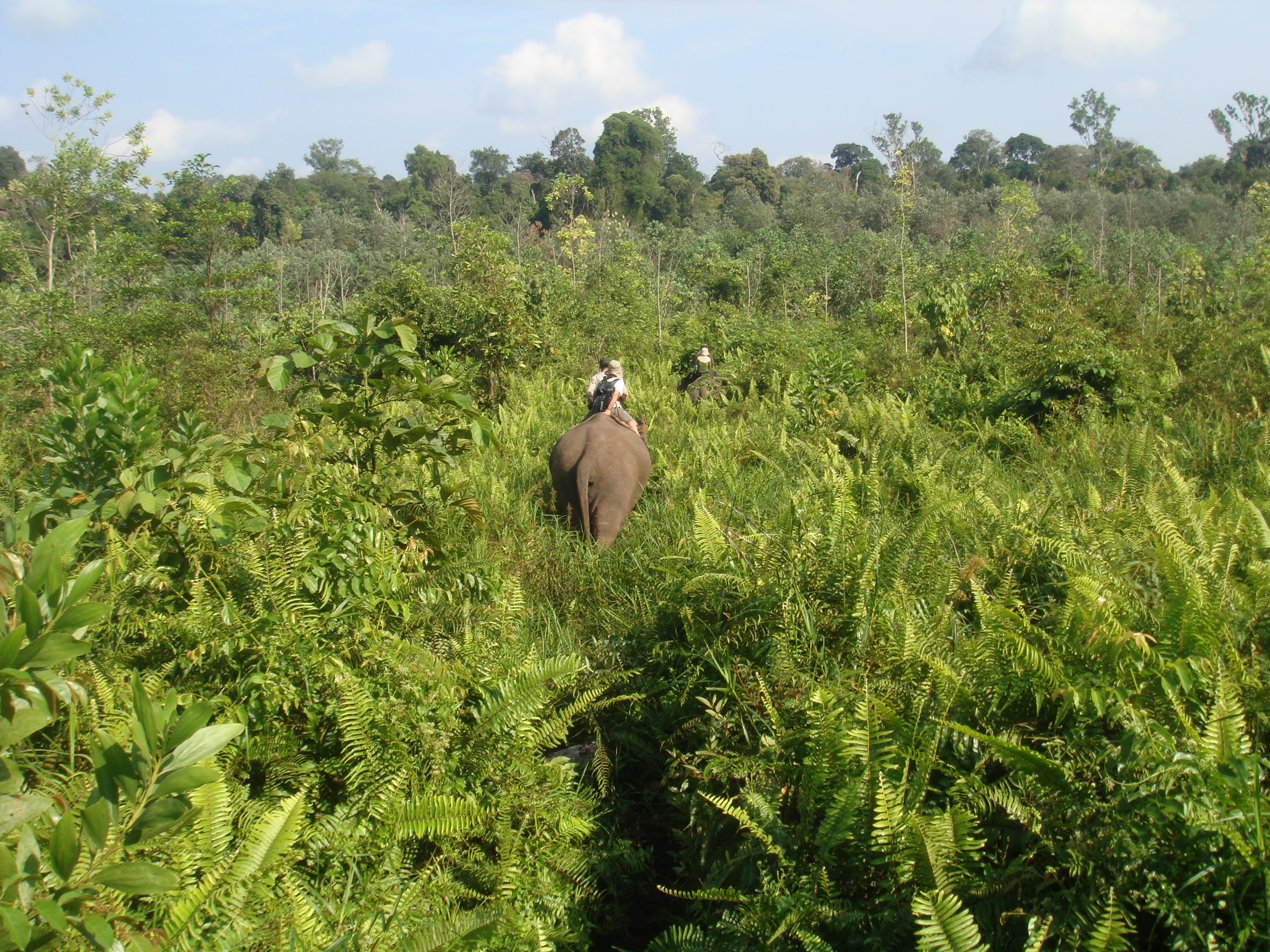

- Location within Sumatra Location within Indonesia
- Location: Sumatra, Indonesia
- Coordinates: 0°5′S 101°36′E
- Area: 1,000 km^{2} (390 sq mi)
- Established: 2004
- Governing body: Ministry of Forestry

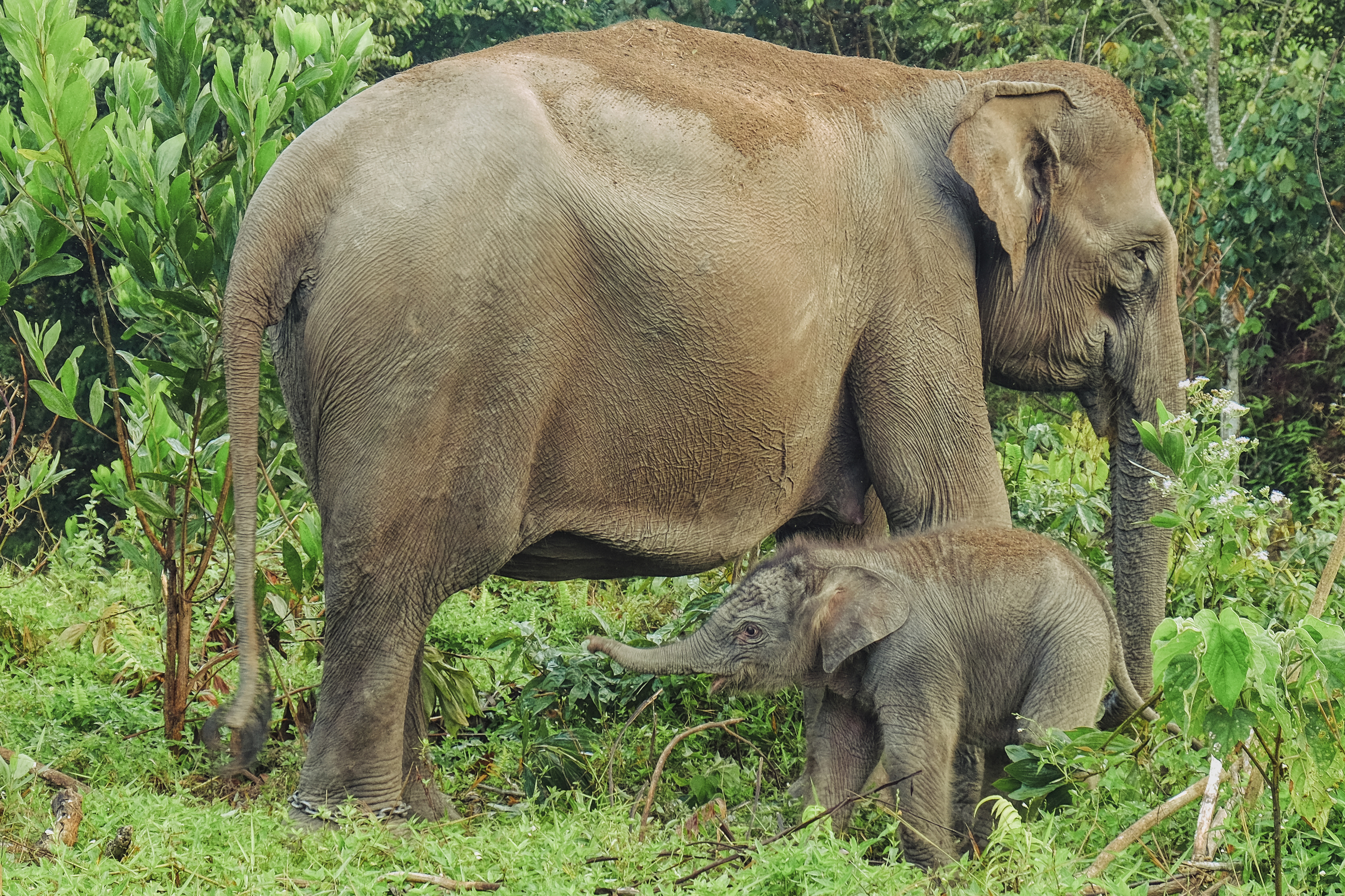
Mother Sumatran elephant & child in the park

Tesso Nilo National Park is a national park in Riau Province, Sumatra, Indonesia. It was declared a national park by the Indonesian government in 2004. The original area of the park was 385.76 km^{2}, but the decision has been made to expand it to 1000 km^{2}. Tesso Nilo National Park houses some of the largest coherent lowland rainforests remaining on Sumatra. The Center for Biodiversity Management has surveyed over 1,800 plots in tropical forests around the world. They found that no other plot has as many vascular plants as in Tesso Nilo. Indonesian Institute of Sciences (LIPI) surveyed forests throughout Sumatra, and also found that Tesso Nilo housed by far the most species.

== Flora and fauna ==
Critically endangered Sumatran elephants and Sumatran tigers live here.

== Conservation and threats ==
The park suffers heavy encroachment from illegal loggers and illegal settlers who clear the park for crops and palm oil plantations, as well as village sites. Already, 28,600 hectares, or about a third of the park, has been deforested. In November 2009, WWF announced that the park had finally been expanded by 44,492 hectares but encroachment still remains a serious problem.

According to a WWF report published in June 2013, oil palm plantations cover 36,353 ha of the Tesso Nilo forest complex, with two business groups (Asian Agri and Wilmar Groups) being involved in the trade of the oil palm fruit illegally grown inside the national park. Furthermore, 50 mills operating around the Tesso Nilo forest complex were identified.

During drought periods, the forest is susceptible to wildfires. In the October 2006 fires, 1 km^{2} of the park was burnt. According to 2009 WWF survey, the population of Sumatran elephants had reached 200 in the park, and around 350 elephant in Riau Province.

=== Elephant conservation centre ===
The Belgian government committed to provide 200,000 euros in assistance for the construction of a Sumatran elephant conservation centre in the Tesso Nilo National Park, with the first quarter to be disbursed in 2011. The project will fund the relocation of dozens of tame elephants from Minas in Siak district, to Tesso Nilo. The relocation was justified by the loss of habitat in Minas due to oil palm plantations and oil mining.

In 2012, the elephant population in the park is estimated 120 to 150 elephants through samples of elephant dropping. For three months, starting late of June, Deoxyribonucleic acid (DNA) of elephants' faeces are being conducted to get the actual number of elephants.

== See also ==
- Geography of Indonesia
