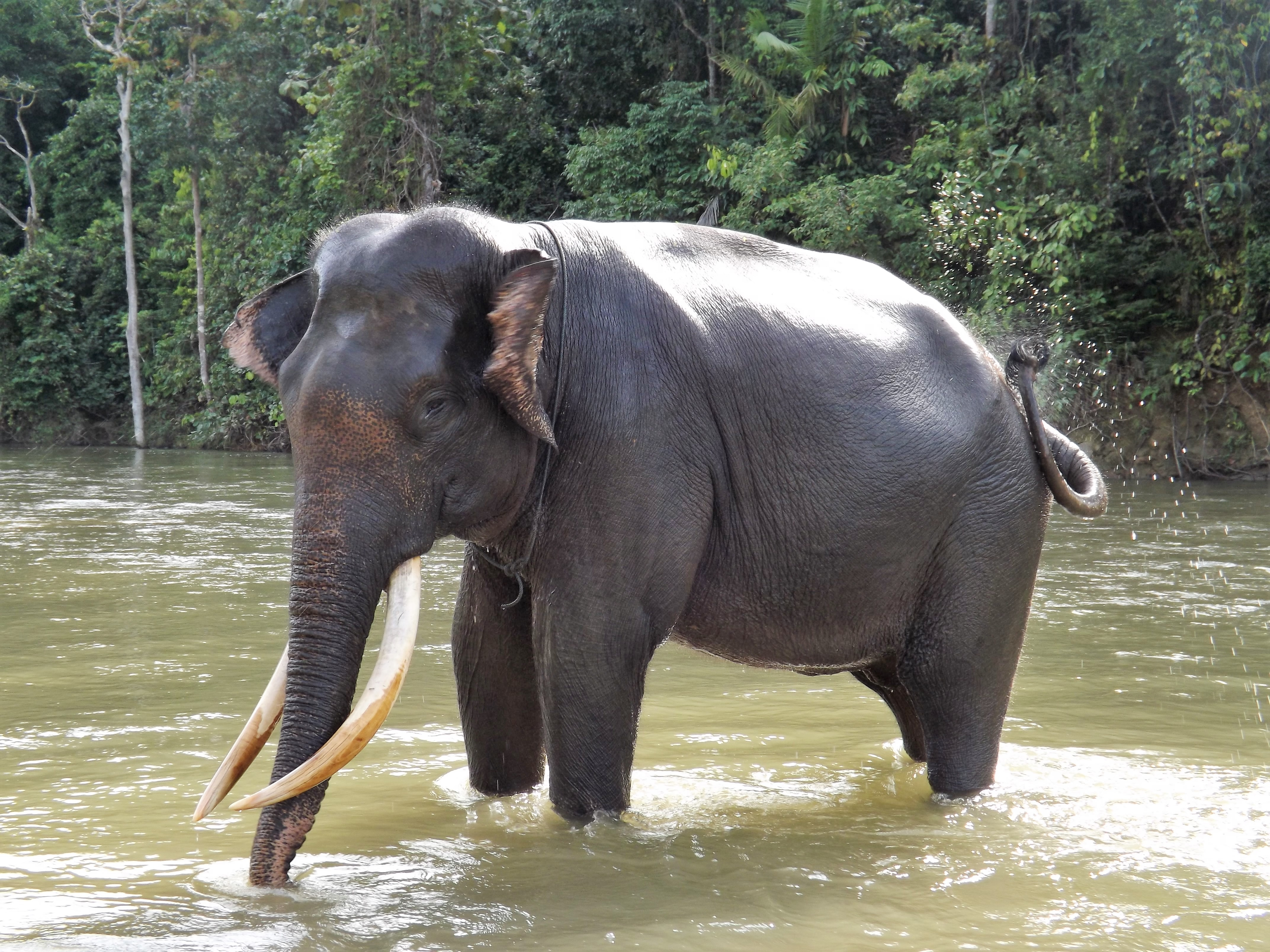
- Sumatran elephant

Scientific classification
- Kingdom: Animalia
- Phylum: Chordata
- Class: Mammalia
- Order: Proboscidea
- Family: Elephantidae
- Tribe: Elephantini
- Genus: Elephas; Linnaeus, 1758

Type species
- Elephas maximus Linnaeus, 1758

Species
- Elephas maximus; †Elephas hysudricus; †Elephas hysudrindicus; †Elephas ekorensis?; †Elephas planifrons; †Elephas beyeri; For others, see text

Synonyms
- Hypselephas; Elephantus

= Elephas =

Elephas Temporal range: Pliocene to Present (Possible late Miocene record)

Genus of mammals

Elephas is a genus of elephants and one of two surviving genera in the family Elephantidae, with only a single living species, the Asian elephant (E. maximus). Several extinct species have been identified as belonging to the genus, extending back to the Pliocene or possibly the late Miocene.

== Description ==
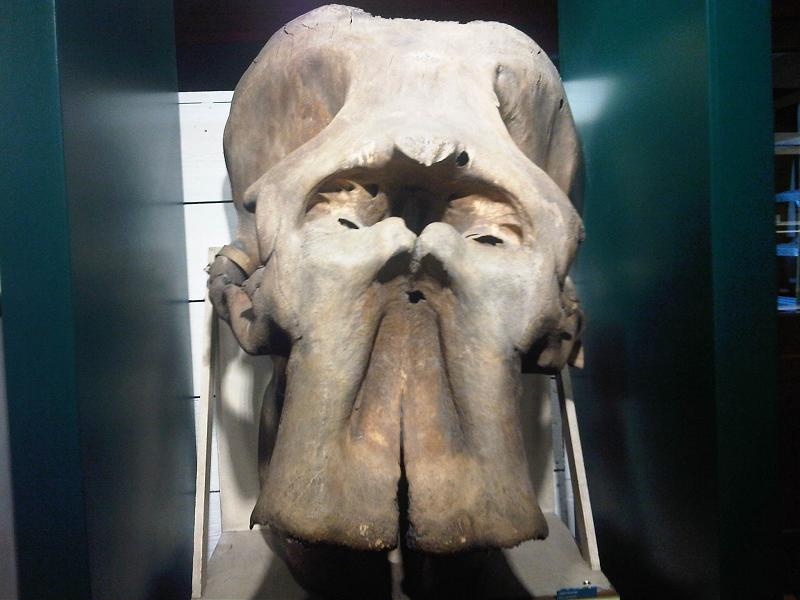
Skull of Elephas maximus

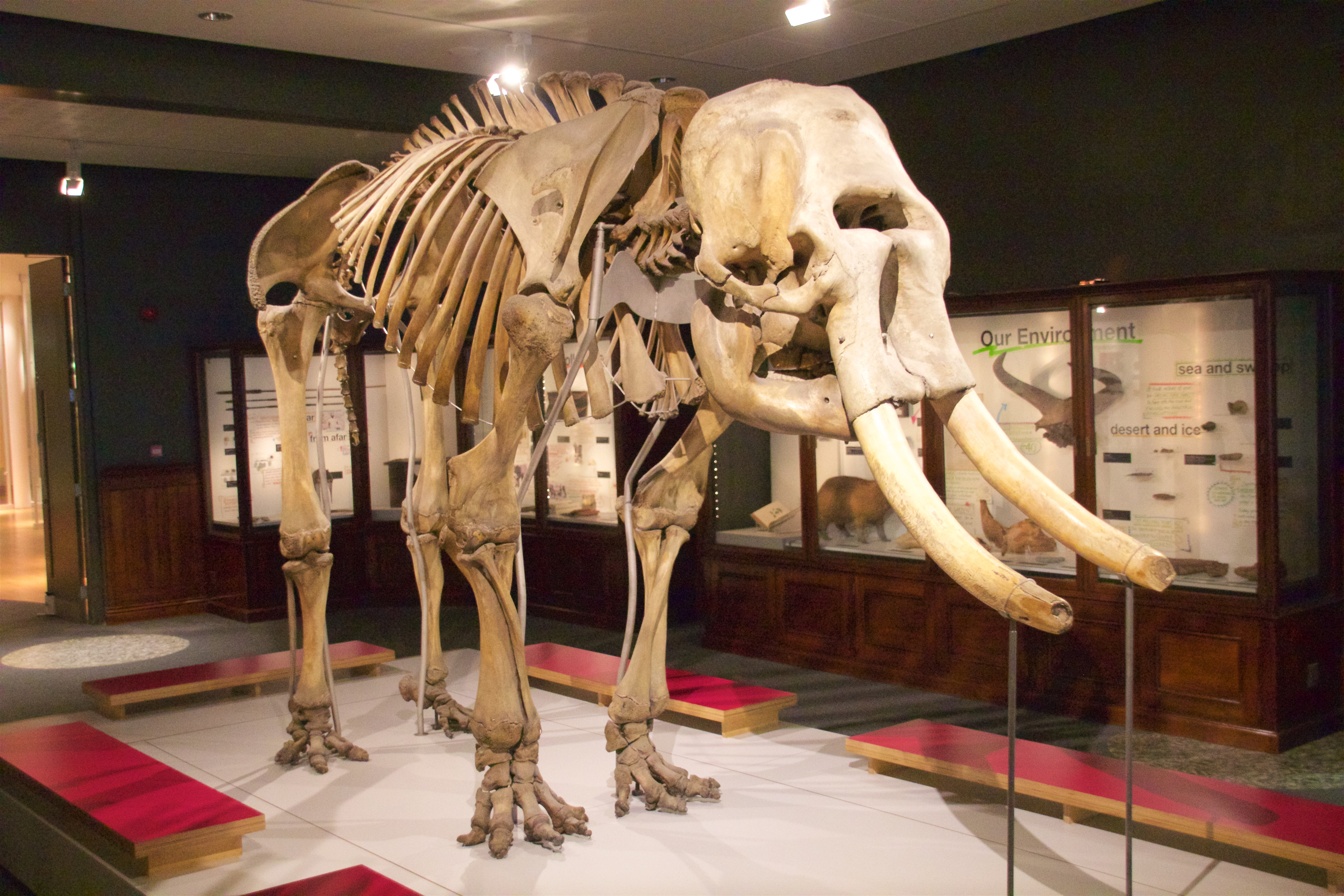
Skeleton of an adult male Asian elephant

Species of Elephas have distinct bossing of the parieto-occipital region of the skull. The premaxillae bones containing the tusks are tapered.

== Evolutionary history ==
Relationships of living and extinct elephantids based on DNA, after Palkopoulou et al. 2018.

- Elephantidae
  - - Loxodonta (African elephants)
    - †Palaeoloxodon (straight-tusked elephants)
  - - Elephas (Asian elephants)
    - †Mammuthus (mammoths)

Asian elephants share a closer common ancestry with mammoths (genus Mammuthus) than they do with African elephants (Loxodonta). The oldest species attributed to the genus Elephas is E. nawataensis from the Late Miocene-Early Pliocene of Kenya, though the validity of this species and its relationship to Elephas has been doubted. The oldest species widely attributed to the genus, Elephas ekorensis is known from the early-mid Pliocene (5–4.2 million years ago) of East Africa, though the attribution of this species to Elephas has been questioned, due to a lack of shared morphological features with later Elephas species. The oldest record of the genus outside of Africa is Elephas planifrons which is known from the Late Pliocene of the Indian subcontinent, around 3.6 million years ago. However, the placement of Elephas planifrons within the genus has also been questioned. The earliest fossils of the ancestor of the modern Asian elephant, Elephas hysudricus date to the beginning of the Pleistocene, around 2.6 million years ago, with remains found on the Indian subcontinent. Modern Asian elephants had evolved from E. hysrudicus by the Late Pleistocene.

== Taxonomy ==
In modern taxonomy the authority of Elephas and species Elephas maximus is considered to be Carl Linnaeus 1758 10th edition of Systema Naturae, the foundational work of modern zoological taxonomy, though Linnaeus had used "Elephas" in manuscripts of earlier editions of the Systema Naturae at likely at least as early as 1734, where he debated about whether rhinoceroses should be included within Elephas. In 1754 he has previously used "Elephas indicus", but this is now considered invalid. Linnaeus based his description of the genus and species based on a variety of specimens and sources (the practice of assigning a type specimen for a species did not yet exist). One of the original specimens that Linnaeus had described was an elephant foetus preserved in a jar of alcohol, belonging to King Adolf Frederick of Sweden and previously the apothecary Albertus Seba. Later genetic testing of the foetus in 2013 (which is now held in the Swedish Museum of Natural History) conclusively proved that this specimen was of an African elephant rather than an Asian elephant (confirming Seba's statement that the specimen was of African origin). Linnaeus extensively referenced a description of an elephant skeleton by John Ray from 1693, which is very likely that of the Asian elephant Hansken from Sri Lanka which was toured around Europe during the 17th century. The skeleton of this elephant is almost certainly one that is still in the collections of the Natural History Museum of the University of Florence. The Florence specimen was designated as the lectotype for Elephas maximus in 2014.

Elephas formerly included all living elephant species. The African bush elephant (Loxodonta africana), was originally described as a species of Elephas, Elephas africanus by Johann Friedrich Blumenbach in 1797 before later being moved to the separate genus Loxodonta. The African forest elephant (Loxodonta cyclotis), was also originally described under Elephas as Elephas cyclotis by Paul Matschie in 1900.

- Elephas maximus – Asian elephant
  - Elephas maximus indicus – Indian elephant
  - Elephas maximus maximus – Sri Lankan elephant
  - Elephas maximus sumatranus – Sumatran elephant
  - Elephas maximus borneensis – Borneo elephant, proposed but not yet recognized as valid

The following Asian elephants were proposed as extinct subspecies, but are now considered synonymous with the Indian elephant:

- Elephas maximus sondaicus – Javan elephant †
- Elephas maximus rubridens – Chinese elephant †
- Elephas maximus asurus – Syrian elephant †

The following Elephas species are extinct:

- Elephas beyeri? – possible dwarf elephant species described by von Königswald in 1956 from a single now lost cheek tooth found in the northern Philippines.
- Elephas ekorensis – described from the Kubi Algi Formation, Turkana, Kenya, dating to the Early Pliocene, one of the oldest species of the genus.
- Elephas hysudricus – described from fossil remains found in the Siwalik Hills of the northern Indian subcontinent by Falconer and Cautley, 1845, thought to be the ancestor of the living Asian elephant.
- Elephas hysudrindicus – a fossil elephant of the Pleistocene of Java and different from Elephas maximus sondaicus
- Elephas planifrons - one of the oldest species, known from the Late Pliocene-Early Pleistocene of the Indian subcontinent.
- Elephas platycephalus a species sometimes recognised from the Pleistocene of India
- Elephas kiangnanensis a species sometimes recognised from the Early-Middle Pleistocene of China.
- Elephas nawataensis a species of elephant known from the Late Miocene-Early Pliocene of Kenya, though other authors argue that this species is actually a synonym of Primelephas korotorensis.
- Elephas atavus? known from the Early Pleistocene of Africa, traditionally considered part of Elephas/Palaeoloxodon recki

While formerly assigned to this genus, Elephas recki, Elephas namadicus, the straight-tusked elephant E. antiquus and the dwarf elephants E. falconeri and E. cypriotes are now placed in the separate genus Palaeoloxodon, which is more closely related to African elephants. However, some material historically assigned to Elephas recki, such as Elephas recki atavus, may be closely related to true Elephas, rather than to Palaeoloxodon "Elephas" celebensis is now placed in Stegoloxodon.
