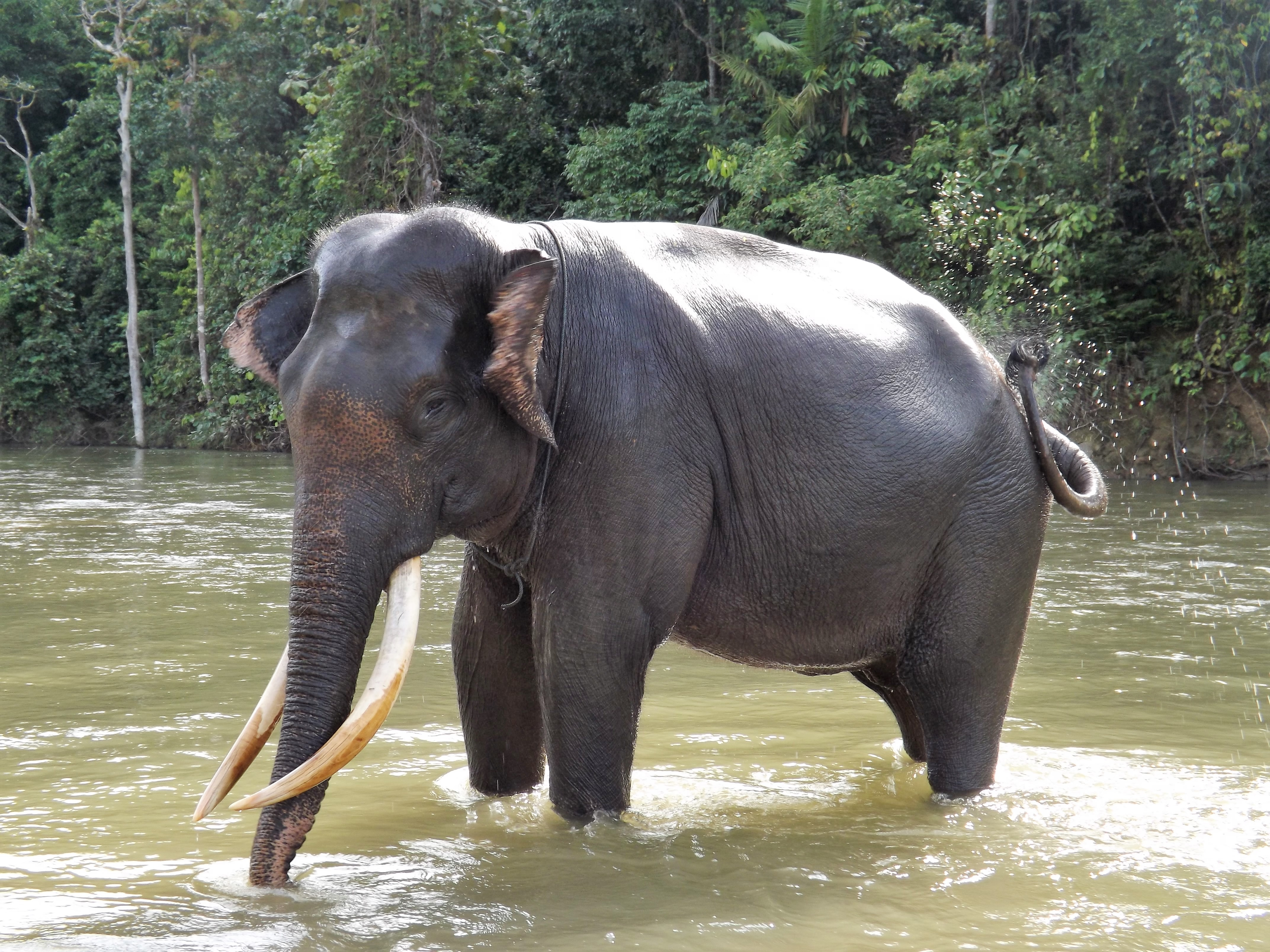
- Male Sumatran elephant in Aceh Province
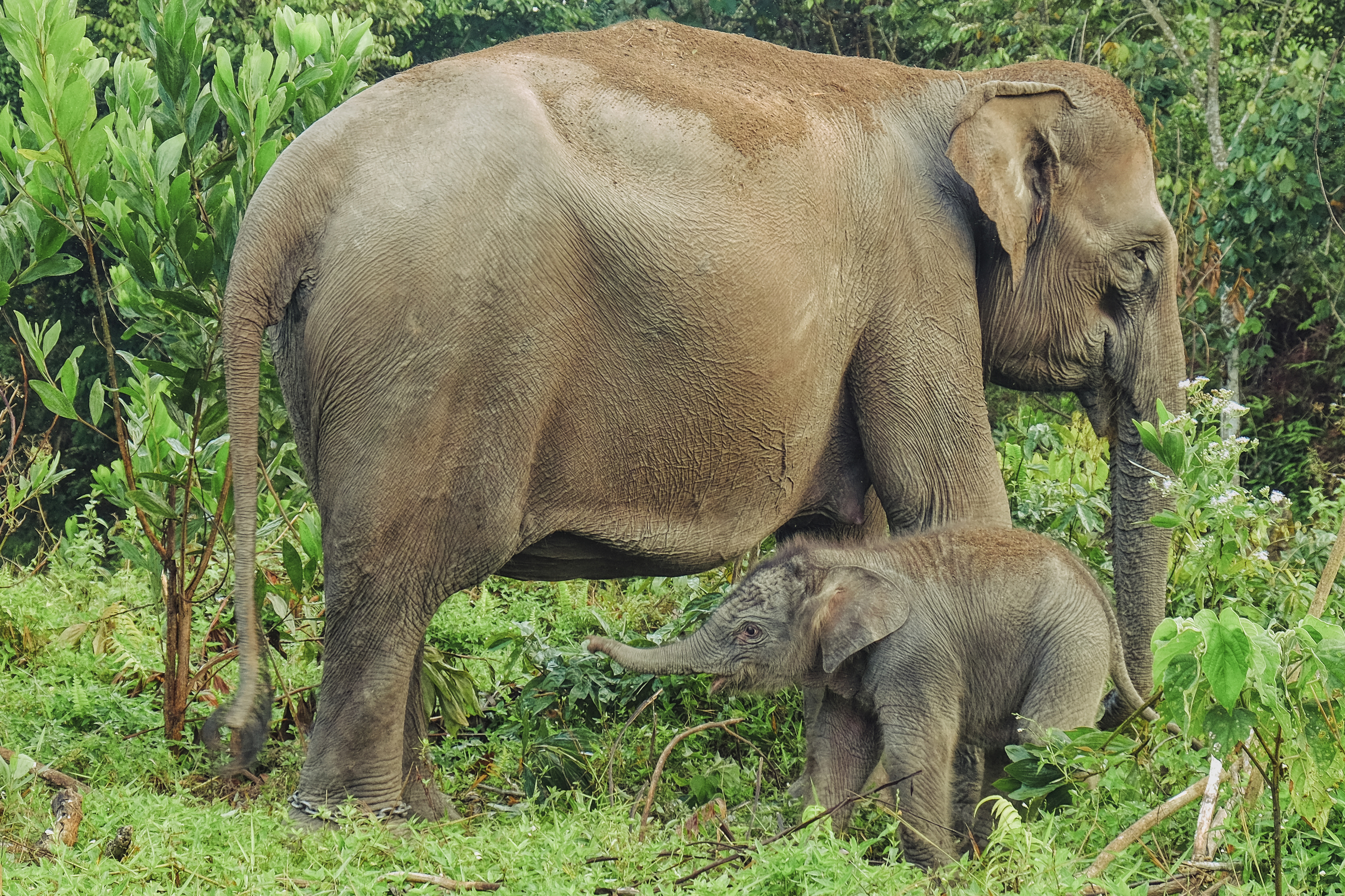
- Female Sumatran elephant and her calf at Tesso Nilo National Park

Conservation status
- Critically Endangered (IUCN 3.1)

Scientific classification
- Kingdom: Animalia
- Phylum: Chordata
- Class: Mammalia
- Order: Proboscidea
- Family: Elephantidae
- Genus: Elephas
- Species: E. maximus
- Subspecies: E. m. sumatranus

Trinomial name
- Elephas maximus sumatranus Temminck, 1847

= Sumatran elephant =

Subspecies of mammal

The Sumatran elephant (Elephas maximus sumatranus) is one of three recognized subspecies of the Asian elephant, and native to the Indonesian island of Sumatra. In 2011, IUCN upgraded the conservation status of the Sumatran elephant from endangered to critically endangered in its Red List as the population had declined by at least 80% during the past three generations, estimated to be about 75 years. The subspecies is preeminently threatened by habitat loss, degradation and fragmentation, and poaching; over 69% of potential elephant habitat has been lost within the last 25 years. Much of the remaining forest cover is in blocks smaller than 250 km^{2} (97 sq mi), which are too small to contain viable elephant populations.

== Characteristics ==
The Asian elephant has a convex or level back is and the highest body point on the head. The tip of its trunk has one finger-like process. Females are usually smaller than males, and have short or no tusks. The Sumatran elephant has 20 pairs of ribs, reaches a shoulder height of between 2 and 3.2 m (6 ft 7 in and 10 ft 6 in) and weighs between 2,000 and 4,000 kg (4,400 and 8,800 lb). Its skin colour is lighter than of the Sri Lankan elephant and the Indian elephant even with the least depigmentation.

== Distribution and habitat ==
The Sumatran elephant was once widespread on Sumatra, and the Riau Province probably had the largest elephant population on the island with over 1,600 individuals in the 1980s. In 1985, an island-wide rapid survey suggested that between 2,800 and 4,800 elephants lived in all eight mainland provinces of Sumatra in 44 units. Twelve of them lived in Lampung Province, where only three populations were extant in 2002 according to surveys carried out between September 2000 and March 2002. The population in Bukit Barisan Selatan National Park was estimated at 498 individuals, while the population in Way Kambas National Park was estimated at 180 individuals. The third population in Gunung Rindingan–Way Waya complex was considered to be too small to be viable over the long-term.

By 2008, elephants had become locally extinct in 23 of the 43 ranges identified in Sumatra in 1985, indicating a very significant decline of the Sumatran elephant population up to that time. By 2008, the elephant was locally extinct in West Sumatra Province and at risk of being lost from North Sumatra Province too. In Riau Province, only about 350 elephants survived across nine separate ranges.

As of 2007, the population of Sumatran elephants is estimated to be 2,400–2,800 wild individuals, excluding elephants in camps, in 25 fragmented populations across the island. More than 85% of their habitat is outside of protected areas.

In Aceh, radio-collared Sumatran elephant clans preferred areas in dense natural forests in river and mountain valleys at elevation below 200 m (660 ft); from there, they moved into heterogenous forests and foraged near human settlements mainly by night.

== Ecology and behaviour ==
Female elephants stop reproducing after 60 years of age. The maximum longevity in the wild is around 60 years. Female captive elephants have survived until 75 years while males have survived 60 years. They give birth mostly at night, which lasts about 10 seconds. A healthy calf is usually able to stand up on its own after 30 minutes.

Female elephants hit their growth plateau at a younger age and develop faster than male elephants, while male elephants grow to larger size and continue to grow as they age.

== Threats ==
Due to conversion of forests into human settlements, agricultural areas and plantations, many of the Sumatran elephant populations have lost their habitat to humans. As a result, many elephants have been removed from the wild or directly killed. Between 1980 and 2005, 69% of potential Sumatran elephant habitat was lost within just one elephant generation.

Most of the elephants found in Sumatran camps were captured after crop-raiding in protected areas. The reduction of the elephants' habitat for illegal conversion of agriculture and palm oil plantations still continues. Between 2012 and 2015, 36 elephants were found dead in Aceh Province due to electrocution, poisoning, and traps. Most dead elephants were found near palm oil plantations, which elephants often attempt to destroy (sometimes successfully) as impediments to their foraging.

Sumatran elephants prefer areas of low elevation and gentler slopes, including those along the river and mountain valleys; humans also prefer these same features, which results in competition between elephants and humans for the same space. Crop protection efforts, which mainly consist of trying to chase elephants out of crop fields or moving them deeper into the forest away from farms, has restricted access for some elephants to these areas.

== Conservation ==
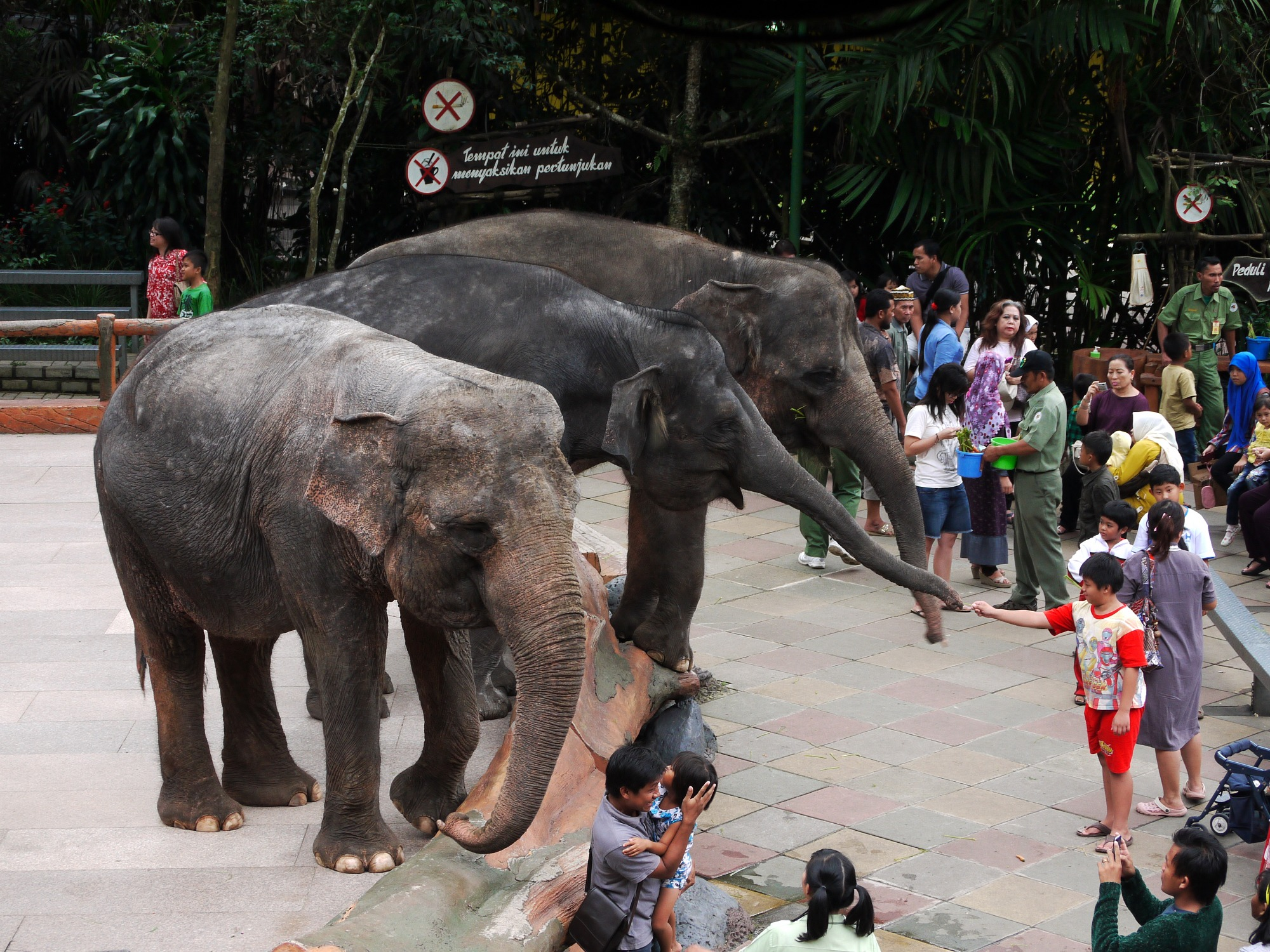
Sumatran elephants performing in a show at Taman Safari, Bogor

The Asian elephant is listed on CITES Appendix I. The Sumatran elephant is protected under Indonesian law. Between 1986 and 1995, 520 wild elephants were captured and kept in six Elephant Training Centres, which have been established since 1986 in the provinces of Lampung, Aceh, Bengkulu, North and South Sumatra and Riau. Capturing wild elephants was stopped in 1999, since the maintenance of captive elephants was too expensive, their management had not become self-financing and because some of the centres were overcrowded. By the end of 2000, 391 elephants were kept in the centres, and a few more in zoos, safari parks and tourist areas.

In 2004, Tesso Nilo National Park has been established in Riau Province to protect the Sumatran elephant's habitat. This forest is one of the last areas large enough to support a viable elephant population.

== See also ==
- Borneo elephant
