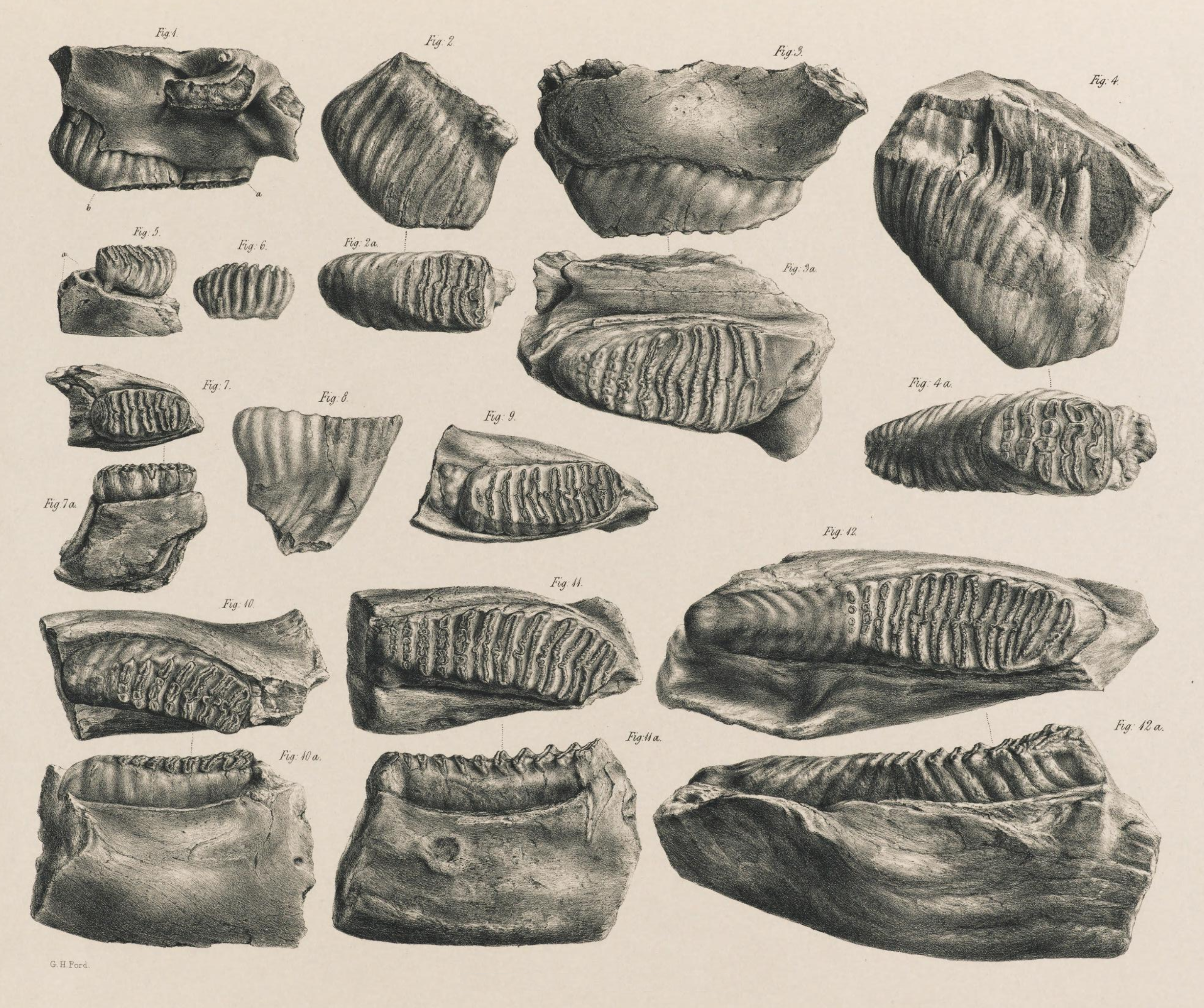
- Teeth of Elephas hysudricus from the species description by Hugh Falconer and Proby Thomas Cautley

Scientific classification
- Kingdom: Animalia
- Phylum: Chordata
- Class: Mammalia
- Order: Proboscidea
- Family: Elephantidae
- Genus: Elephas
- Species: †E. hysudricus

Binomial name
- †Elephas hysudricus (Falconer and Cautley, 1845)

Synonyms
- Hypselephas hysudricus

= Elephas hysudricus =

Elephas hysudricus Temporal range: Early Pleistocene–Middle Pleistocene

Extinct species of mammal

Elephas hysudricus is an extinct elephant species known from the Pleistocene of Asia. It is thought to be ancestral to the living Asian elephant, from which it is distinguished by the molar teeth having a lower crown height and a lower lamellae number. Remains of the species are primarily known from the Indian subcontinent, with the most important remains coming from the Siwalik Hills. The oldest remains of the species in the Siwaliks are placed at around 2.6 million year ago at the beginning of the Early Pleistocene, with the youngest dates in the Siwaliks during the Middle Pleistocene around 0.6 million years ago, though it likely persisted on the subcontinent later than this based on remains found elsewhere.

Remains likely attributable to the species are also known from the Levant in Israel and Jordan, dating to the late Middle Pleistocene, likely sometime between 500 and 100,000 years ago. Isotopic analysis of specimens from the Indian subcontinent suggests that early members of the species were likely primarily grazers, but shifted towards mixed feeding (both browsing and grazing) after the arrival of the substantially larger elephant species Palaeoloxodon namadicus to the region. It is suggested to be closely related and possibly ancestral to the extinct Elephas hysudrindicus from the Pleistocene of Java in Indonesia.
