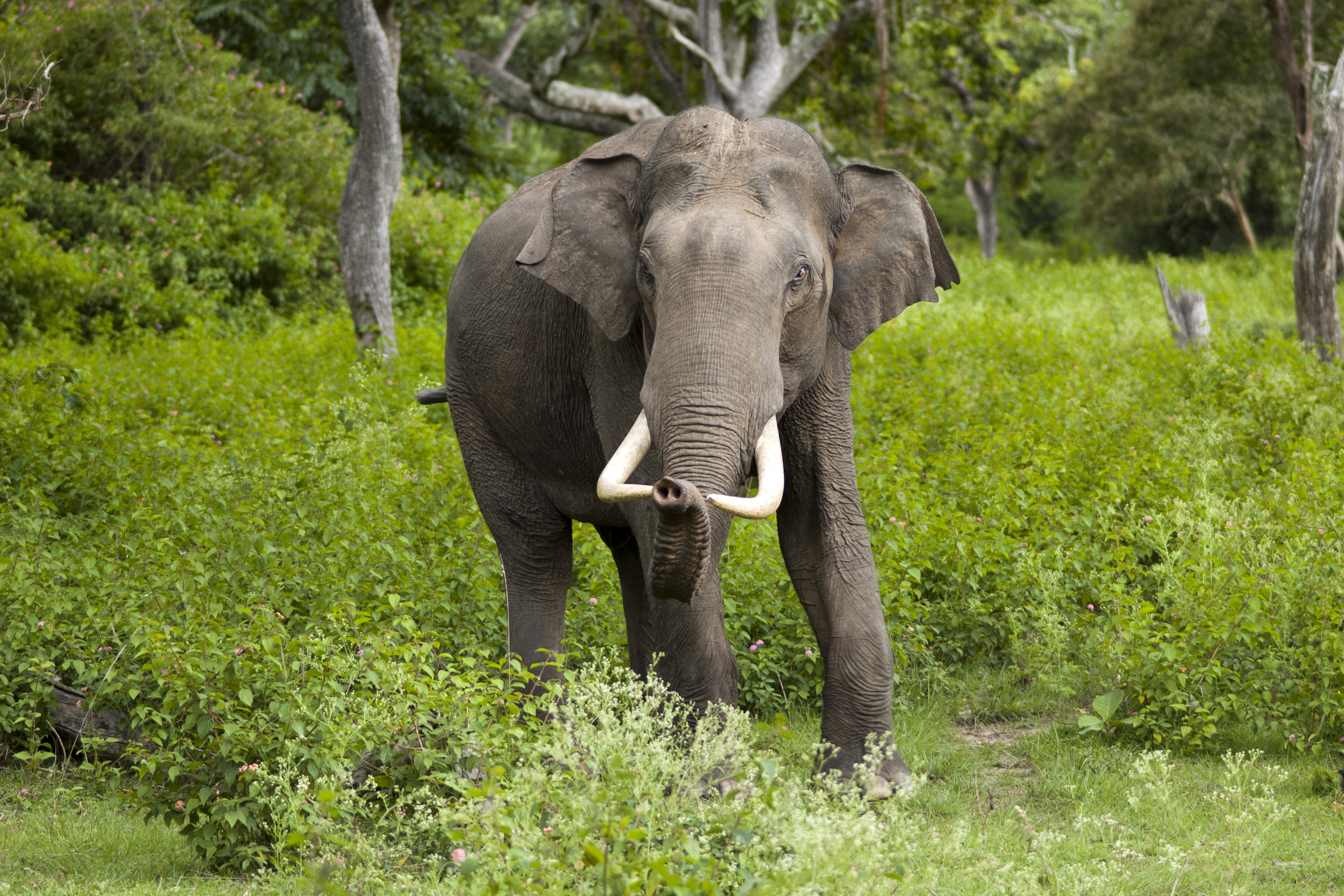
- A tusked bull in Bandipur National Park
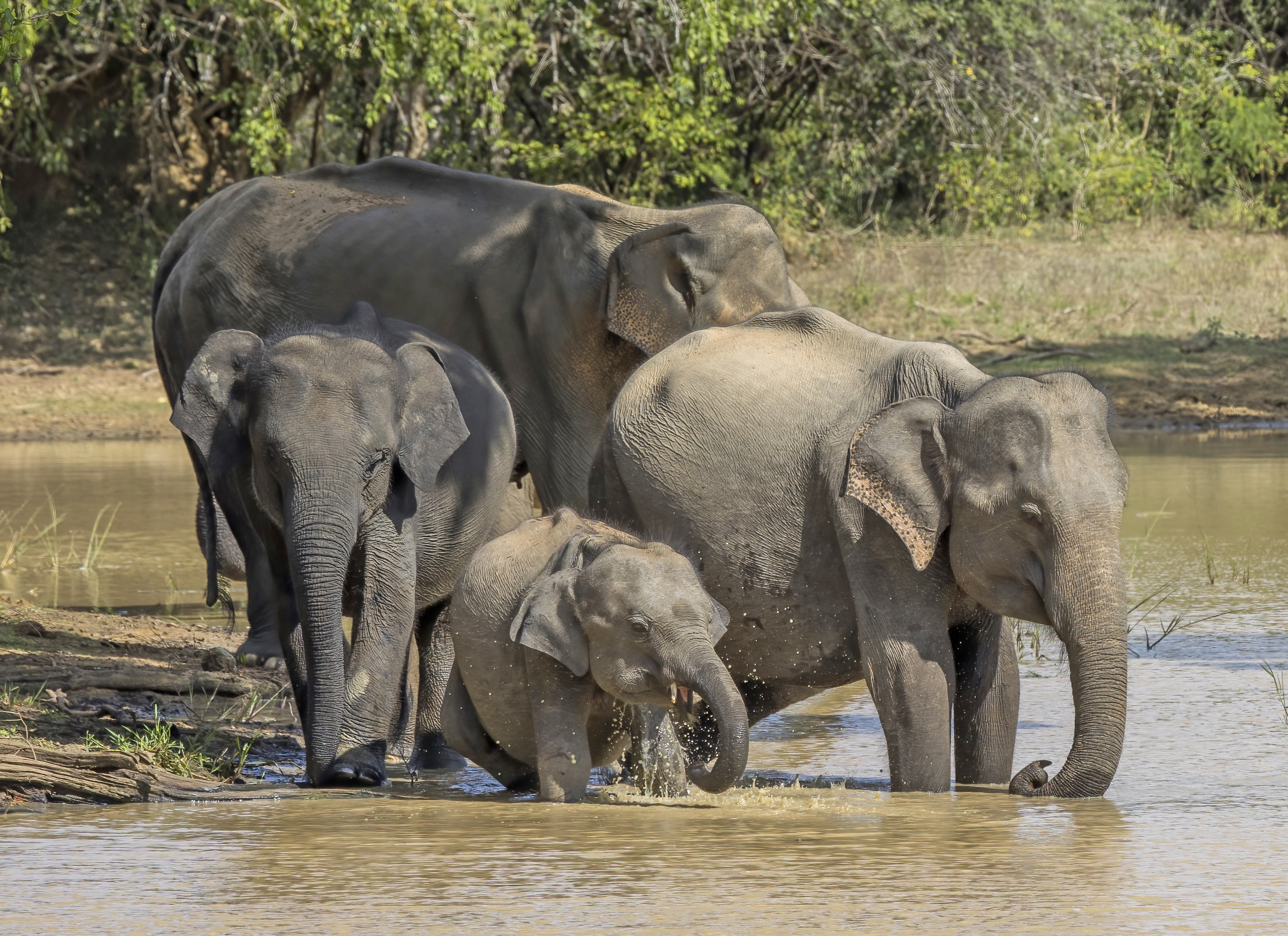
- A herd in Yala National Park

Conservation status
- Endangered (IUCN 3.1)
- CITES Appendix I

Scientific classification
- Kingdom: Animalia
- Phylum: Chordata
- Class: Mammalia
- Order: Proboscidea
- Family: Elephantidae
- Genus: Elephas
- Species: E. maximus

Binomial name
- Elephas maximus Linnaeus, 1758

Subspecies
- E. m. maximus; E. m. indicus; E. m. sumatranus
- Historical range Range in early 21st century

= Asian elephant =

Asian elephant Temporal range: Pleistocene–Recent

Second-largest species of elephant

The Asian elephant (Elephas maximus), also known as the Asiatic elephant, is the only living species in the genus Elephas. It is the largest living land animal in Asia and the second largest living elephantid in the world. It is characterised by its long trunk with a single finger-like process; large tusks in males; laterally folded large ears and wrinkled grey skin that is partly depigmented on the trunk, ears or neck. Adult males average 4 t (4.4 short tons) in weight and females 2.7 t (3.0 short tons). It has a large and well developed neocortex of the brain, is highly intelligent and self-aware, being able to display behaviours associated with grief, learning and greeting. Three subspecies are recognised—E. m. maximus, E. m. indicus and E. m. sumatranus.

The Asian elephant is distributed in the Indian subcontinent and Southeast Asia, from India in the west to Borneo in the east, and Nepal in the north to Sumatra in the south. It inhabits grasslands, tropical evergreen forests, semi-evergreen forests, moist deciduous forests, dry deciduous forests and dry thorn forests. It is herbivorous, eating about 150 kg (330 lb) of vegetation per day. Cows and calves form groups, while males remain solitary or form "bachelor groups" with other males. During the breeding season, males temporarily join female groups to mate. Wild Asian elephants live to be about 60 years old. While female captive elephants are recorded to have lived beyond 60 years when kept in semi-natural surroundings, Asian elephants die at a much younger age in captivity; captive populations are declining due to a low birth and high death rate.

Since 1986, the Asian elephant has been listed as Endangered on the IUCN Red List, as the population has declined by at least 50% over the last three elephant generations, which is about 60–75 years. It is primarily threatened by loss of habitat, habitat degradation, fragmentation and poaching. The earliest indications of captive use of Asian elephants are engravings on seals of the Indus Valley civilisation dated to the 3rd millennium BC.

== Taxonomy ==
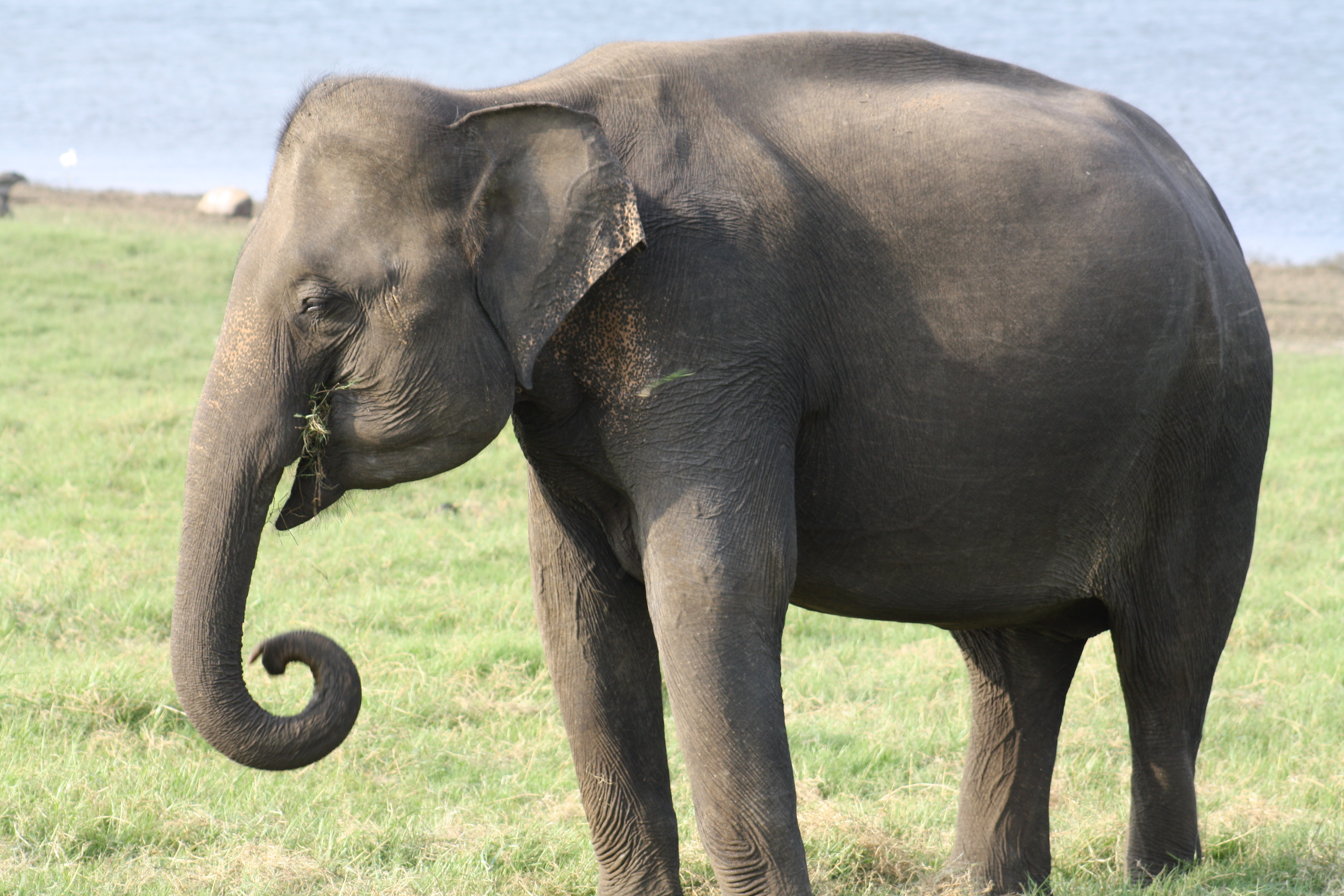
Elephant in Sri Lanka

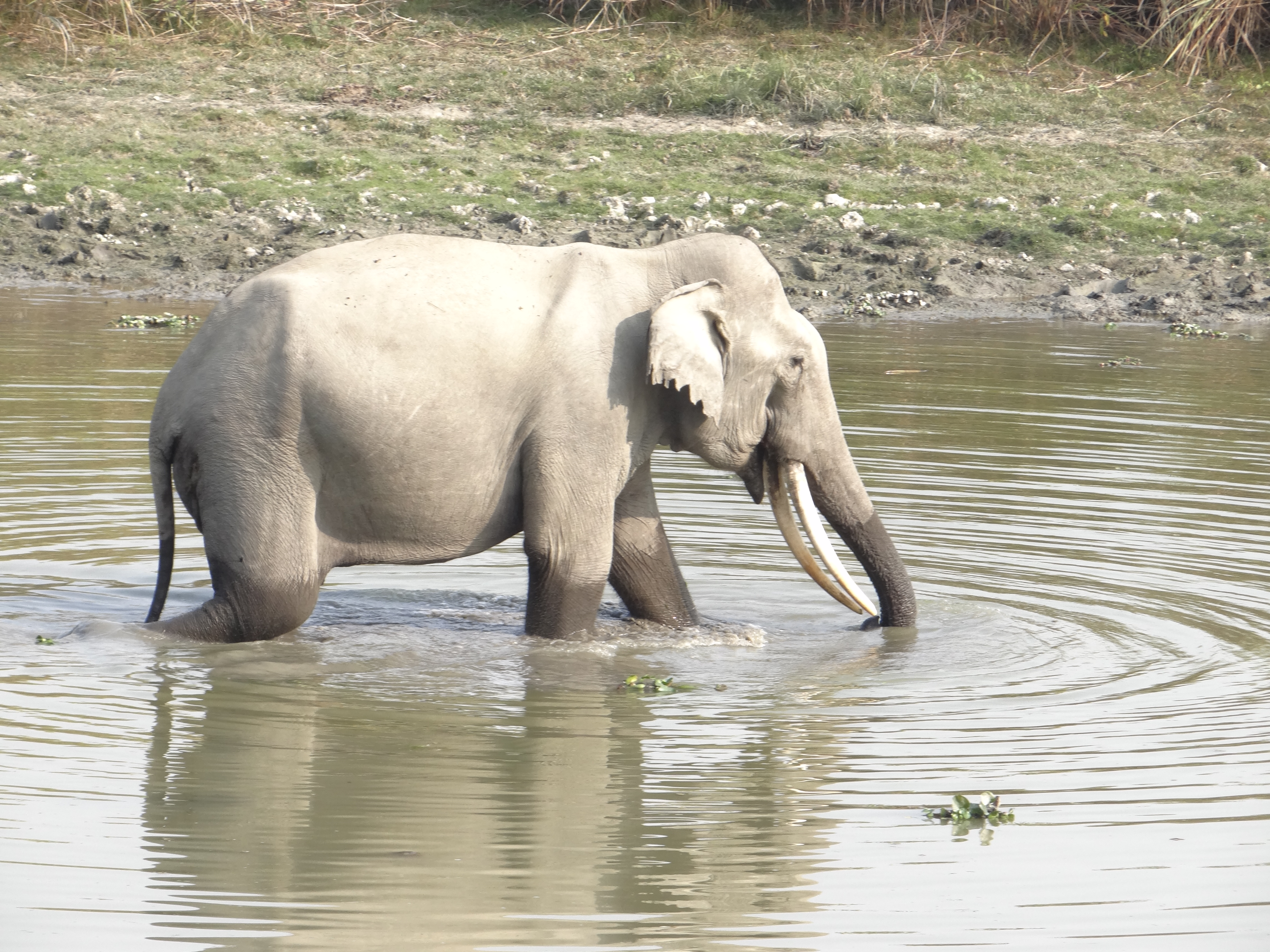
Elephant in Kaziranga National Park, India

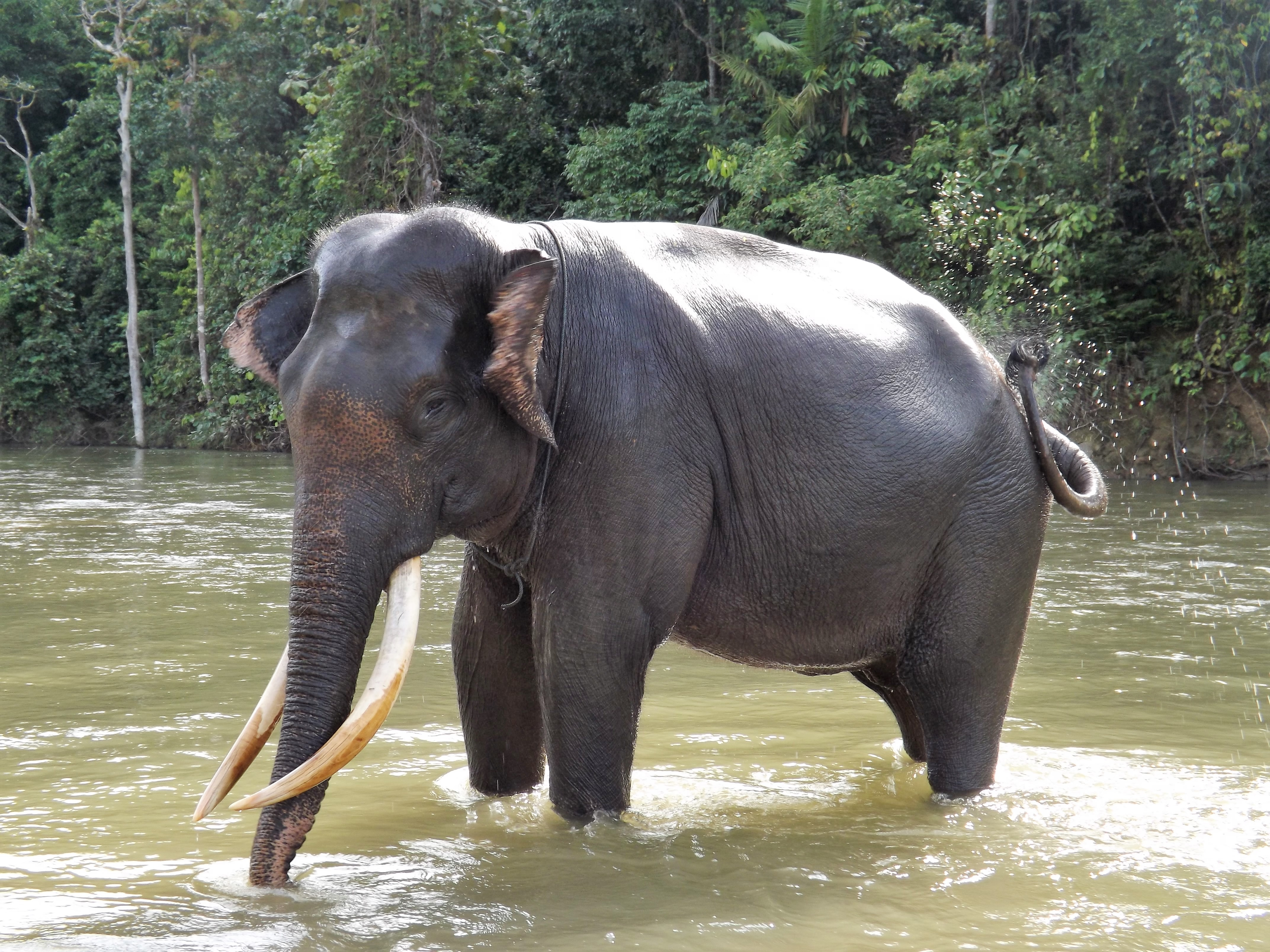
Elephant in Sumatra

Carl Linnaeus proposed the scientific name Elephas maximus in 1758 in the 10th edition of Systema Naturae, the foundational work of modern zoological taxonomy. Carl Linnaeus based his description on a variety of sources and specimens, some of which were later shown to be African elephants. Linnaeus's description heavily relied on a 1693 description of an elephant skeleton by John Ray. This skeleton still exists within the collection of the Natural History Museum of the University of Florence, and almost certainly represents that of Hansken, a female Asian elephant from Sri Lanka that toured Europe in the 17th century. This specimen was declared to be the lectotype specimen for the species in 2014. Elephas indicus was proposed by Georges Cuvier in 1798, who described an elephant from India. Coenraad Jacob Temminck named an elephant from Sumatra Elephas sumatranus in 1847. Frederick Nutter Chasen classified all three as subspecies of the Asian elephant in 1940. These three subspecies are recognised as valid taxa. Results of phylogeographic and morphological analyses indicate that the Sri Lankan and Indian elephants are not distinct enough to warrant classification as separate subspecies.

Three subspecies are recognised:

- Sri Lankan elephant (E. maximus maximus Linnaeus, 1758)
- Indian elephant (E. maximus indicus Cuvier, 1798)
- Sumatran elephant (E. maximus sumatranus Temminck, 1847)

Sri Lankan elephants are the largest subspecies. Their skin colour is darker than of E. m. indicus and of E. m. sumatranus with larger and more distinct patches of depigmentation on ears, face, trunk and belly. The skin color of the Indian elephant is generally grey and lighter than that of E. m. maximus but darker than that of E. m. sumatranus.

A potential fourth subspecies, the Borneo elephant (Elephas maximus borneensis), occurs in Borneo's northeastern parts, primarily in Sabah (Malaysia), and sometimes in Kalimantan (Indonesia). It was proposed by Paules Deraniyagala in 1950, who described an elephant in an illustration published in the National Geographic magazine, but not as a living elephant in accordance with the rules of the International Code of Zoological Nomenclature. These elephants living in northern Borneo are smaller than all the other subspecies, but had larger ears, a longer tail, and straight tusks. Results of genetic analysis indicate that their ancestors separated from the mainland population about 300,000 years ago. A study in 2003, using mitochondrial DNA analysis and microsatellite data, indicated that the Borneo elephant population is derived from stock that originated in the region of the Sunda Islands, and suggests that the Borneo population has been separated from the other elephant populations of southeast Asia since the Pleistocene.

The following Asian elephants were proposed as extinct subspecies, but are now considered synonymous with the Indian elephant:

- Syrian elephant (E. m. asurus), proposed by Deraniyagala, based on fossil remains and Bronze Age illustrations.
- Chinese elephant (E. m. rubridens), also proposed by Deraniyagala, based on a Chinese bronze statuette.
- Javan elephant (E. m. sondaicus), also proposed by Deraniyagala, based on an illustration of a carving on the Buddhist monument of Borobudur.

=== Evolution ===
Elephantids phylogeny based on morphological and DNA evidence

- Elephantidae
  - - Loxodonta
    - †Palaeoloxodon
  - - Elephas
    - †Mammuthus

The genus Elephas, of which the Asian elephant is the only living member, is the closest relative of the extinct mammoths. The two groups are estimated to have split from each other around 7 million years ago. Elephas originated in Sub-Saharan Africa during the Pliocene and spread throughout Africa before expanding into the southern half of Asia. The earliest Elephas species, Elephas ekorensis, is known from the Early Pliocene of East Africa, around 5–4.2 million years ago. The oldest remains of the genus in Asia are known from the Siwalik Hills in the Indian subcontinent, dating to the late Pliocene, around 3.6 to 3.2 million years ago, assigned to the species Elephas planifrons. The modern Asian elephant is suggested to have evolved from the species Elephas hysudricus, which first appeared at the beginning of the Early Pleistocene around 2.6 million years ago, and is primarily known from remains of Early-Middle Pleistocene age found on the Indian subcontinent. Skeletal remains of E. m. asurus have been recorded from the Middle East: Iran, Iraq, Syria, and Turkey from periods dating between at least 1800 BC and likely 700 BC.

== Description ==
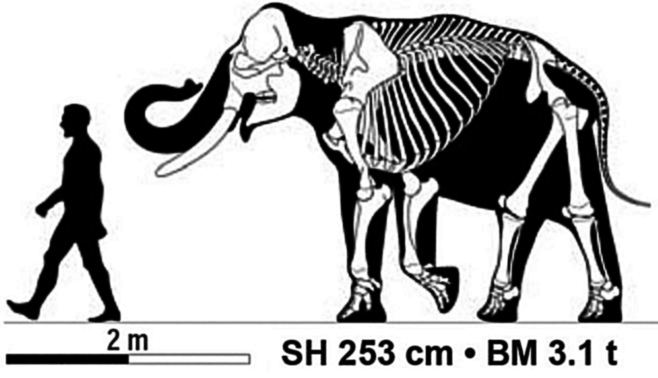
Young adult male Asian elephant skeleton compared to a human

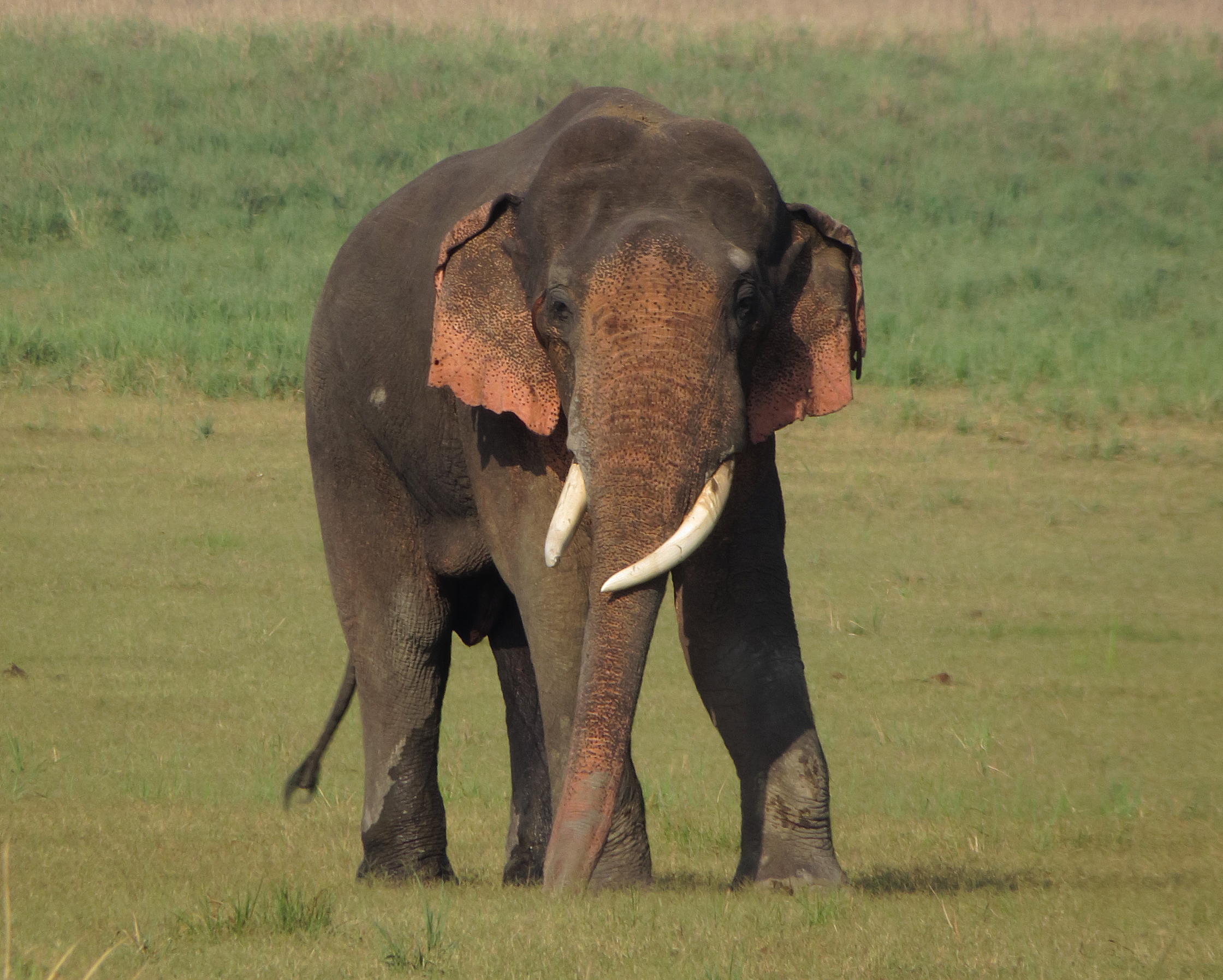
Depigmented skin on the forehead and ears of an Asian elephant

In general, the Asian elephant is smaller than the African bush elephant and has the highest body point on the head. The back is convex or level. The ears are small with dorsal borders folded laterally. It has up to 20 pairs of ribs and 34 caudal vertebrae. The feet have five nail-like structures on each forefoot, and four on each hind foot. The forehead has two hemispherical bulges, unlike the flat front of the African elephants. Its long trunk or proboscis has only one fingerlike tip, in contrast to the African elephants, which have two. Hence, the Asian species relies more on wrapping around a food item and squeezing it into its mouth, rather than grasping with the tip. Asian elephants have more muscle coordination and can perform more complex tasks.

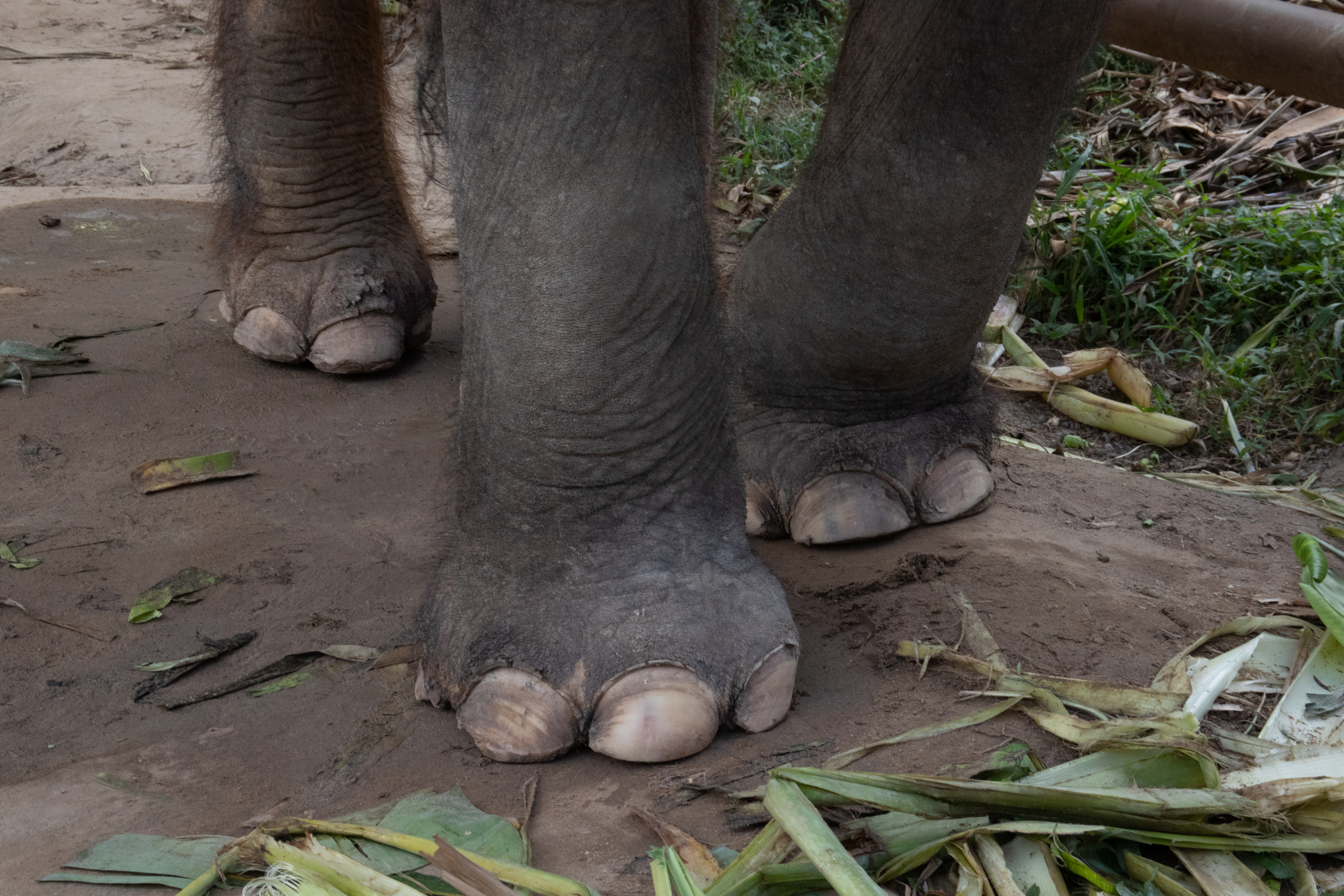
The nail-like structures on the toes of an Asian elephant

Cows usually lack tusks; if tusks—in that case, called "tushes"—are present, they are barely visible and seen only when the mouth is open. The enamel plates of the molars are greater in number and closer together in Asian elephants. Some bulls may also lack tusks; these individuals are called "makhnas" and are especially common among the Sri Lankan elephant population. A tusk from an 11 ft (3.4 m) tall elephant killed by Sir Victor Brooke measured 8 ft (2.4 m) in length, and nearly 17 in (43 cm) in circumference, and weighed 90 lb (41 kg). This tusk's weight is, however, exceeded by the weight of a shorter tusk of about 6 ft (1.8 m) in length, which weighed 100 lb (45 kg), and there have reportedly been tusks weighing over 150 lb (68 kg).

Skin colour is usually grey, and may be masked by soil because of dusting and wallowing. Their wrinkled skin is movable and contains many nerve centres. It is smoother than that of African elephants and may be depigmented on the trunk, ears, or neck. The epidermis and dermis of the body average 18 mm (0.71 in) thick; skin on the dorsum is 30 mm (1.2 in) thick providing protection against bites, bumps, and adverse weather. Its folds increase surface area for heat dissipation. They can tolerate cold better than excessive heat. Skin temperature varies from 24 to 32.9 °C (75.2 to 91.2 °F). Body temperature averages 35.9 °C (96.6 °F).

=== Size ===
On average, when fully-grown, bulls are about 2.75 m (9 ft 0 in) tall at the shoulder and 4.0 t (4.4 short tons) in weight, while cows are smaller at about 2.40 m (7 ft 10 in) at the shoulder and 2.7 t (3.0 short tons) in weight. Sexual dimorphism in body size is relatively less pronounced in Asian elephants than in African bush elephants; with bulls averaging 15% and 23% taller in the former and latter respectively. Length of body and head including trunk is 5.5–6.5 m (18–21 ft) with the tail being 1.2–1.5 m (3 ft 11 in – 4 ft 11 in) long. The largest bull elephant ever recorded was shot by the Maharajah of Susang in the Garo Hills of Assam, India, in 1924, it weighed an estimated 7 t (7.7 short tons), stood 3.43 m (11.3 ft) tall at the shoulder and was 8.06 m (26.4 ft) long from head to tail. The Raja Gaj elephant in Bardia National Park was estimated to be 3.4 m (11.3 ft) tall at the shoulder and one of the biggest Asian bull elephants. There are reports of larger individuals as tall as 3.66 m (12.0 ft) and 2.92 m (9 ft 7 in), and 7.99 m (26.2 ft) long from head to tail.

== Distribution and habitat ==
Number of asian elephants

Asian elephants are distributed throughout the Indian subcontinent and Southeast Asia, from India in the west, to Borneo in the east, and Nepal in the north, to Sumatra in the south. They inhabit grasslands, tropical evergreen forests, semi-evergreen forests, moist deciduous forests, dry deciduous forests and dry thorn forests, in addition to cultivated and secondary forests and scrublands. Over this range of habitat types elephants occur from sea level to over 3,000 m (9,800 ft). In the eastern Himalaya in northeast India, they regularly move up above 3,000 m (9,800 ft) in summer at a few sites.

In Bangladesh, some isolated populations survived in the south-east Chittagong Hills in the early 1990s. In Malaysia's northern Johor and Terengganu National Park, two Asian elephants tracked using satellite tracking technology spent most of their time in secondary or "logged-over forest"; they travelled 75% of their time in an area less than 1.5 km (0.93 mi) away from a water source. In China, the Asian elephant survives only in the prefectures of Xishuangbanna, Simao and Lincang of southern Yunnan. As of 2020, the estimated population was around 300 individuals.

As of 2017, the estimated wild population in India account for nearly three-fourths of the extant population, at 27,312 individuals. In 2019, the Asian elephant population in India increased to an estimated 27,000–29,000 individuals. As of 2019, the global wild population was estimated at 48,323–51,680 individuals.

== Ecology and behaviour ==
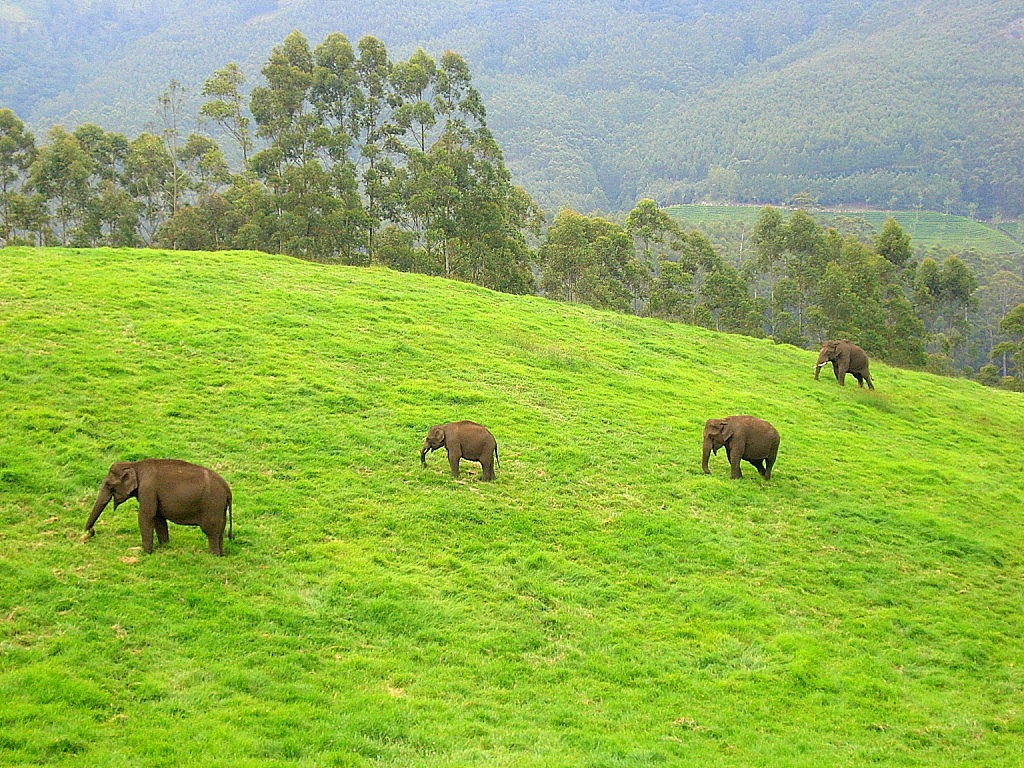
Asian elephants are megaherbivores, consuming large amounts of plant matter. Pictured are grazing elephants from Kerala, India

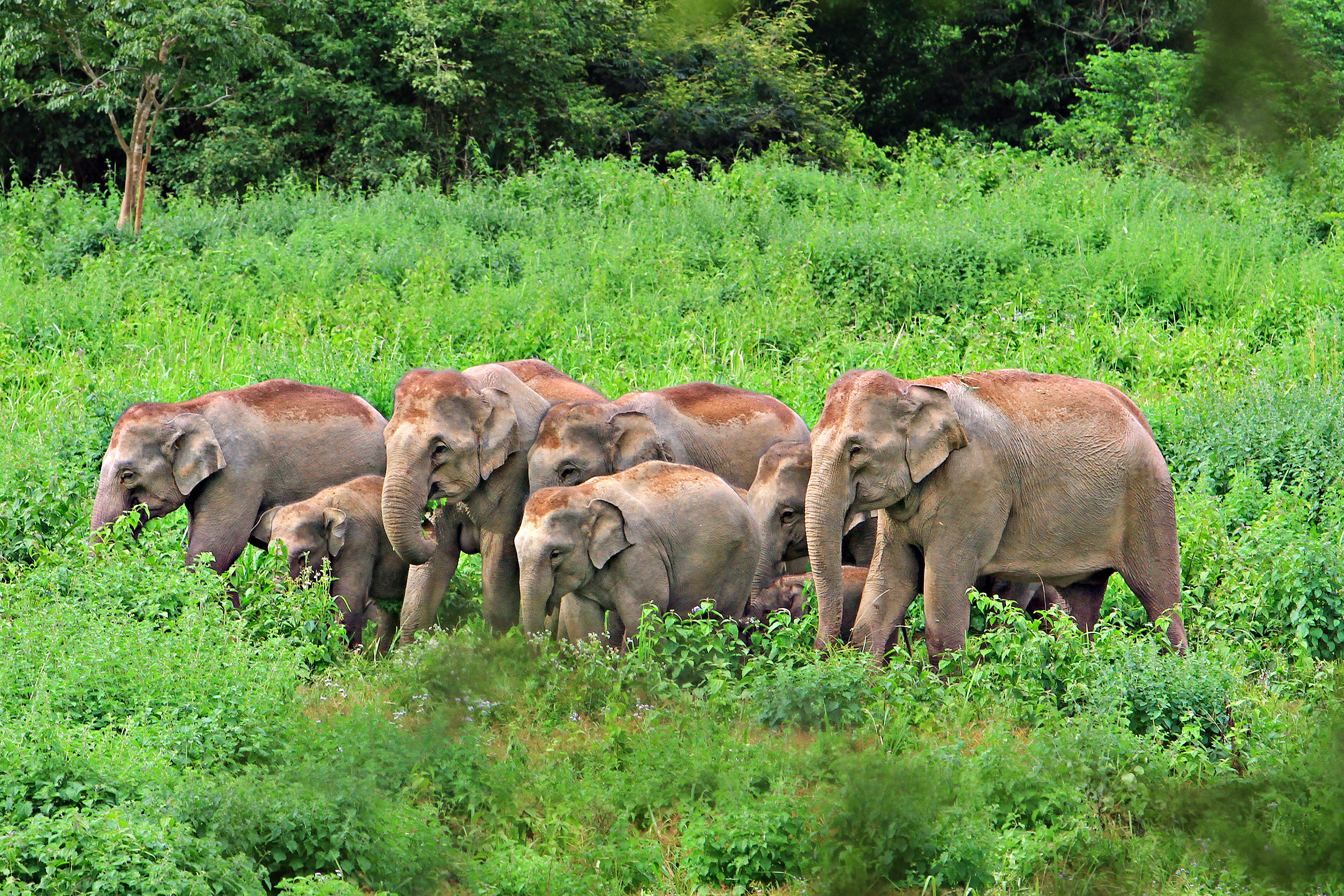
Asian elephant cows and calves live in closely knit groups. Pictured is group of elephants in Thailand

Asian elephants are crepuscular. They are classified as megaherbivores and consume up to 150 kg (330 lb) of plant matter per day. Around 50 to 75% of the day is devoted to eating. They are generalist feeders, and are both grazers and browsers. They are known to feed on at least 112 different plant species, most commonly of the order Malvales, as well as the legume, palm, sedge and true grass families. They browse more in the dry season with bark constituting a major part of their diet in the cool part of that season. They drink at least once a day and are never far from a permanent source of fresh water. They need 80–200 litres of water a day and use even more for bathing. At times, they scrape the soil for clay or minerals.

Cows and calves move about together as groups, while bulls disperse from their mothers upon reaching adolescence. Bulls are solitary or form temporary "bachelor groups". Cow-calf units generally tend to be small, typically consisting of three adults (most likely related females) and their offspring. Larger groups of as many as 15 adult females have also been recorded. Seasonal aggregations of 17 individuals including calves and young adults have been observed in Sri Lanka's Uda Walawe National Park. Until recently, Asian elephants, like African elephants, were thought to be under the leadership of older adult females, or matriarchs. It is now recognized that cows form extensive and very fluid social networks, with varying degrees of associations between individuals. Social ties generally tend to be weaker than in African bush elephants. Unlike African elephants, which rarely use their forefeet for anything other than digging or scraping soil, Asian elephants are more agile at using their feet in conjunction with the trunk for manipulating objects. They can sometimes be known for their violent behavior.

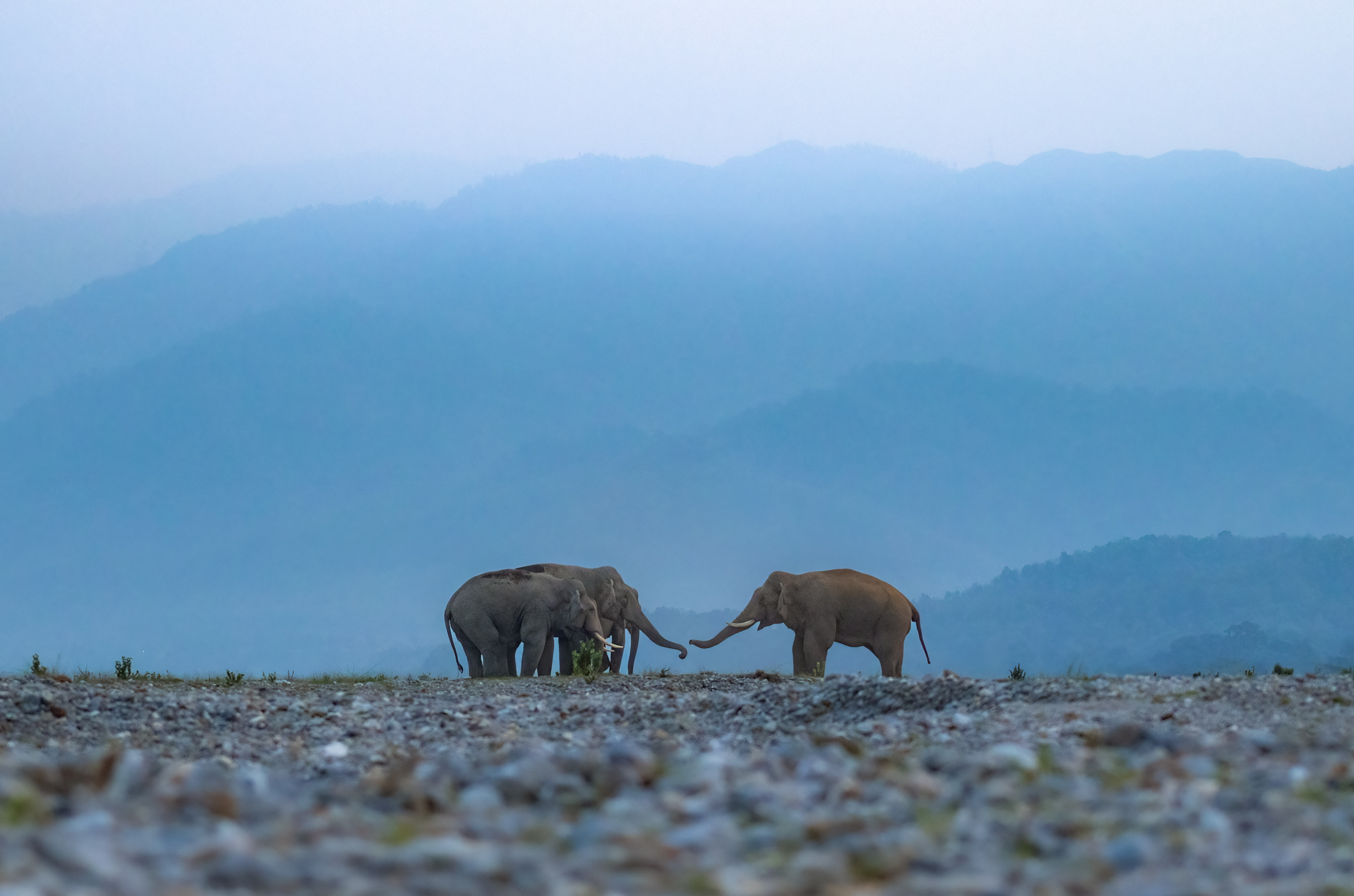
Elephant reunion in East Nepal

Asian elephants are recorded to make three basic sounds: growls, squeaks and snorts. Growls in their basic form are used for short distance communication. During mild arousal, growls resonate in the trunk and become rumbles while for long-distance communication, they escalate into roars. Low-frequency growls are infrasonic and made in many contexts. Squeaks come in two forms: chirpings and trumpets. Chirping consists of multiple short squeaks and signals conflict and nervousness. Trumpets are lengthened squeaks with increased loudness and are produced during extreme arousal. Snorts signal changes in activity and increase in loudness during mild or strong arousal. During the latter case, when an elephant bounces the tip of the trunk, it creates booms which serve as threat displays. Elephants can distinguish low-amplitude sounds.

Rarely, tigers have been recorded attacking and killing calves, especially if the calves become separated from their mothers, stranded from their herd, or orphaned. Adults are largely invulnerable to natural predation. There is a singular anecdotal case of a mother Asian elephant allegedly being killed alongside her calf; however, this account is contestable. In 2011 and 2014, two instances were recorded of tigers successfully killing adult elephants; one by a single tiger in Jim Corbett National Park on a 20-year-old young adult elephant cow, and another on a 28-year-old sick adult bull in Kaziranga National Park further east, which was taken down and eaten by several tigers hunting cooperatively. Elephants appear to distinguish between the growls of larger predators like tigers and smaller predators like leopards; they react to leopards less fearfully and more aggressively.

=== Reproduction ===
Reproduction in Asian elephants can be attributed to the production and perception of signaling compounds called pheromones. These signals are transmitted through various bodily fluids. They are commonly released in urine but in males they are also found in special secretions from the temporal glands. Once integrated and perceived, these signals provide the receiver with information about the reproductive status of the sender. If both parties are ready to breed, reproductive ritualic behavior occurs and the process of sexual reproduction proceeds.

Bulls will fight one another to get access to oestrus cows. Strong fights over access to females are extremely rare. Bulls reach sexual maturity around the age of 12–15. Between the ages of 10 and 20 years, bulls undergo an annual phenomenon known as "musth". This is a period where the testosterone level is up to 100 times greater than non-musth periods, and they become aggressive. Secretions containing pheromones occur during this period, from the paired temporal glands located on the head between the lateral edge of the eye and the base of the ear. The aggressive behaviors observed during musth can be attributed to varying amounts of frontalin (1,5-dimethyl-6,8-dioxabicyclo[3.2.1]octane) throughout the maturation process of bulls. Frontalin is a pheromone that was first isolated in bark beetles but can also be produced in the bulls of both Asian and African Elephants. The compound can be excreted through urine as well as through the temporal glands of the bull, allowing signaling to occur. During musth, increased concentrations of frontalin in the bull's urine communicate the reproductive status of the bull to female elephants.

Similar to other mammals, hormone secretion in female elephants is regulated by an estrous cycle. This cycle is regulated by surges in Luteinizing hormone that are observed three weeks from each other. This type of estrous cycle has also been observed in African Elephants but is not known to affect other mammals. The first surge in Luteinizing hormone is not followed by the release of an egg from the ovaries. However, some female elephants still exhibit the expected mating protocols during this surge. Female elephants give ovulatory cues by utilizing sex pheromones. A principal component thereof, (Z)-7-dodecen-1-yl acetate, has also been found to be a sex pheromone in numerous species of insects. In both insects and elephants, this chemical compound is used as an attractant to assist the mating process. In elephants, the chemical is secreted through urination and this aids in the attraction of bulls to mate. Once detected, the chemical stimulates the vomeronasal organ of the bull, thus providing information on the maturity of the female.

Reproductive signaling exchange between male and female elephants are transmitted through olfactory cues in bodily fluids. In males, the increase in frontalin during musth heightens their sensitivity to the (Z)-7-dodecen-1-yl acetate produced by female elephants. Once perceived by receptors in the trunk, a sequence of ritualistic behaviors follow. The responses in males vary based on both the stage of development and the temperament of the elephant. This process of receiving and processing signals through the trunk is referred to as flehmen. The difference in body movements give cues to gauge if the male is interested in breeding with the female that produced the secretion. A bull that is ready to breed will move closer to the urine and in some cases an erection response is elicited. A bull that is not ready to breed will be timid and try to dissociate themselves from the signal. In addition to reproductive communication, chemosensory signaling is used to facilitate same-sex interactions. When less developed males detect pheromones from a male in musth, they often retreat to avoid coming in contact with aggressive behaviors. Female elephants have also been seen to communicate with each other through pheromone in urine. The purpose of this type of intrasex communication is still being investigated. However, there are clear differences in signaling strength and receiver response throughout different stages of the estrous cycle.

The gestation period is 18–22 months, and the cow gives birth to one calf, only occasionally twins. The calf is fully developed by the 19th month, but stays in the womb to grow so that it can reach its mother to feed. At birth, the calf weighs about 100 kg (220 lb), and is suckled for up to three years. Once a female gives birth, she usually does not breed again until the first calf is weaned, resulting in a four to five-year birth interval. During this period, mother to calf communication primarily takes place through temporal means. However, male calves have been known to develop sex pheromone-producing organs at a young age. Early maturity of the vomeronasal organ allows immature elephants to produce and receive pheromones. It is unlikely that the integration of these pheromones will result in a flehmen response in a calf. Females stay on with the herd, but mature males are chased away.

Female Asian elephants sexually mature around the age of 10~15 and keep growing until 30, while males fully mature at more than the age of 25, and constantly grow throughout their life. Average elephant life expectancy is approximately 60 years. Some individuals are known to have lived into their late 80s. Generation length of the Asian elephant is 22 years.

=== Intelligence ===
Elephant stacking blocks to allow it to reach food

Asian elephants have a very large and highly developed neocortex, a trait also shared by humans, apes and certain dolphin species. They have a greater volume of cerebral cortex available for cognitive processing than all other existing land animals. Results of studies indicate that Asian elephants have cognitive abilities for tool use and tool-making similar to great apes. They exhibit a wide variety of behaviours, including those associated with grief, learning, allomothering, mimicry, play, altruism, use of tools, compassion, cooperation, self-awareness, memory, and language. Elephants reportedly head to safer ground during natural disasters like tsunamis and earthquakes, but data from two satellite-collared Sri Lankan elephants indicate this may be untrue. Several students of elephant cognition and neuroanatomy are convinced that Asian elephants are highly intelligent and self-aware. Others contest this view.

== Threats ==
The pre-eminent threats to the Asian elephant today are the loss, degradation and fragmentation of its habitat, which leads to increasing conflicts between humans and elephants. Asian elephants are poached for ivory and a variety of other products including meat and leather. The demand for elephant skin has risen due to it being an increasingly-common ingredient in traditional Chinese medicine.

=== Human–elephant conflict ===
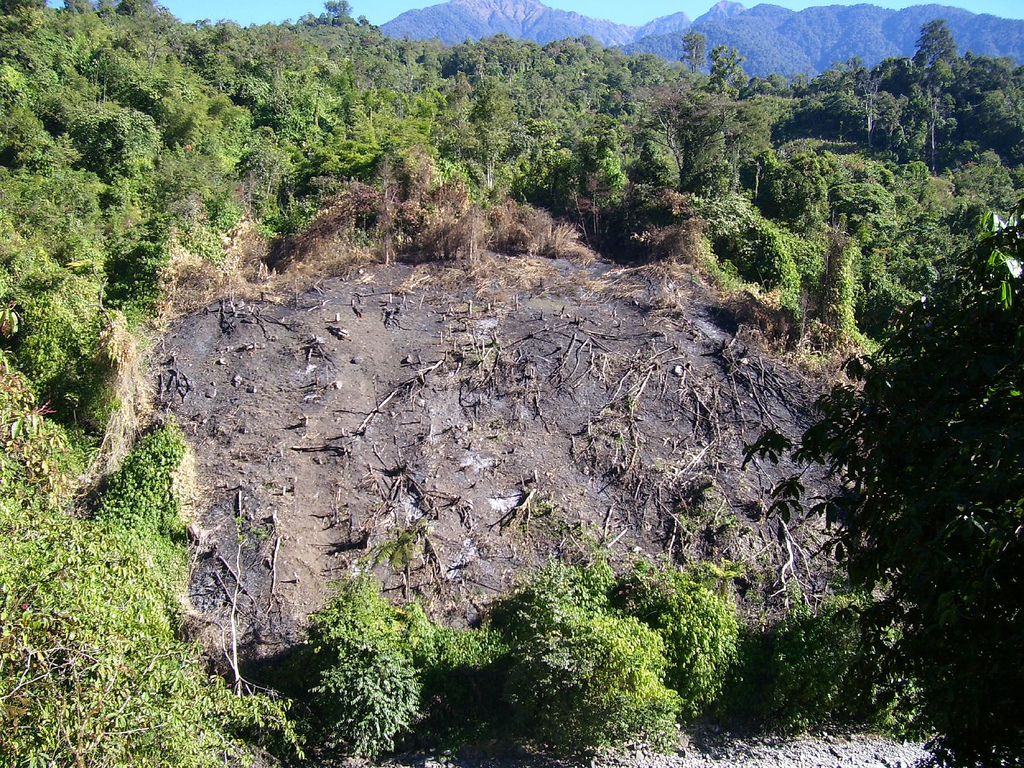
Forests cleared for jhum—a type of shifting cultivation practiced in Arunachal Pradesh, India

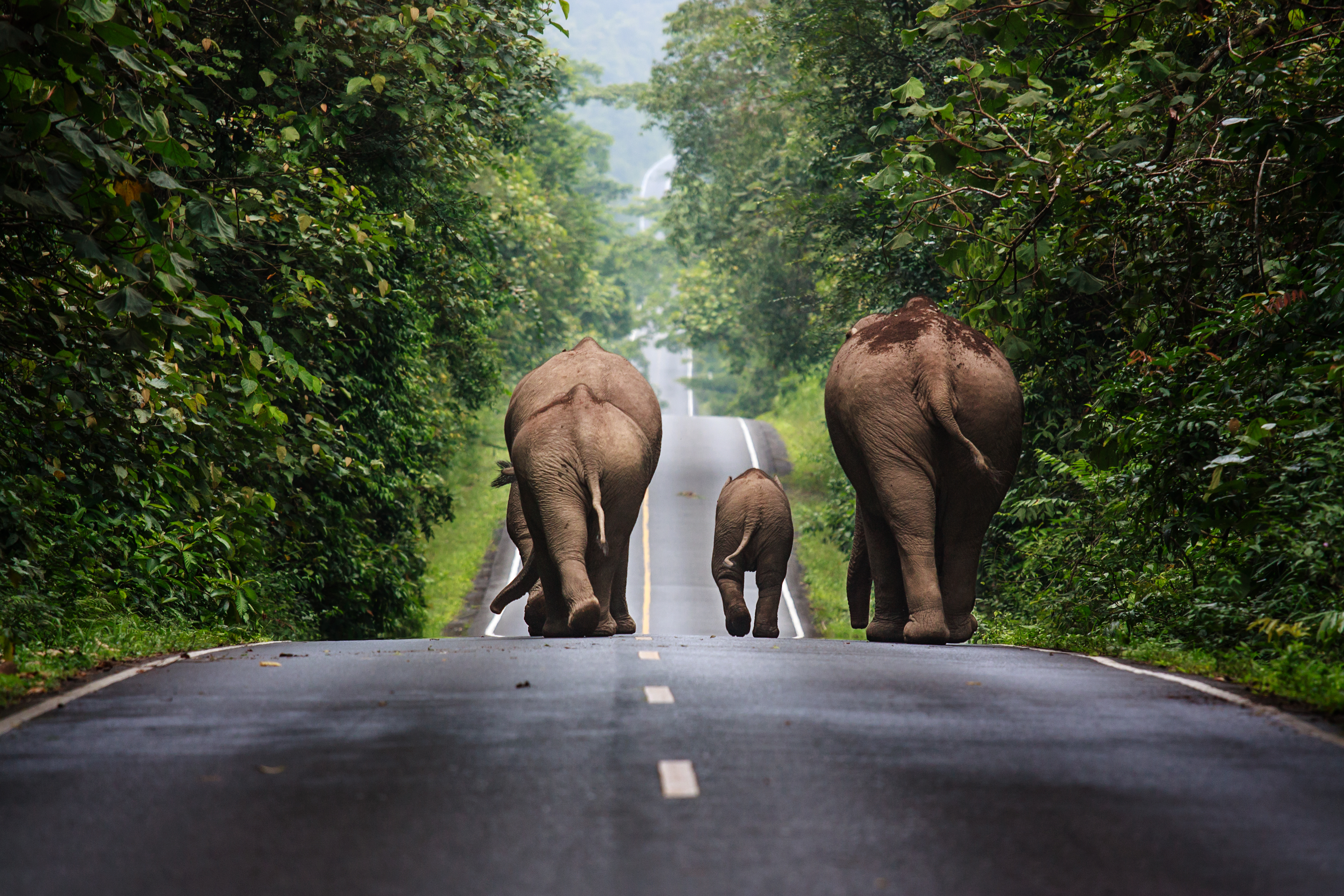
Elephants on the road in Khao Yai National Park, Thailand

In some parts of Asia, people and elephants have co-existed for thousands of years. In other areas, people and elephants come into conflict, resulting in violence, and ultimately, the displacement of elephants. The main causes of human-elephant conflict includes the growing human population, large-scale development projects and poor top-down governance. Proximate causes includes habitat loss due to deforestation, disruption of elephant migratory routes, expansion of agriculture and illegal encroachment into protected areas.

Destruction of forests through logging, encroachment, slash-and-burn, shifting cultivation, and monoculture tree plantations are major threats to the survival of elephants. Human–elephant conflicts occur when elephants raid crops of shifting cultivators in fields, which are scattered over a large area interspersed with forests. Depredation in human settlements is another major area of human–elephant conflict occurring in small forest pockets, encroachments into elephant habitat, and on elephant migration routes. However, studies in Sri Lanka indicate that traditional slash-and-burn agriculture may create optimal habitats for elephants by creating a mosaic of successional-stage vegetation. Populations inhabiting small habitat fragments are much more liable to come into conflict with humans.

Development such as border fencing along the India–Bangladesh border has become a major impediment to the free movement of elephants. In Assam, more than 1,150 humans and 370 elephants died as a result of human-elephant conflict between 1980 and 2003. In a 2010 study, it was estimated that in India alone, over 400 people were killed by elephants each year, and 0.8 to 1 million hectares were damaged, affecting at least 500,000 families across the country. Moreover, elephants are known to destroy crops worth up to US$2–3 million annually. This has major impacts on the welfare and livelihoods of local communities, as well as the future conservation of this species. In countries like Bangladesh and Sri Lanka, the Asian elephant is one of the most feared wild animals, even though they are less deadly than other local animals such as venomous snakes (which were estimated to claim more than 30 times more lives in Sri Lanka than elephants).

As a whole, Asian elephants display highly sophisticated and sometimes unpredictable behaviour. Most untamed elephants try to avoid humans, but if they are caught off guard by any perceived physical threat, including humans, they will likely charge. This is especially true of males in musth and of females with young. Gunfire and other similar methods of deterring, which are known to be effective against many kinds of wild animals including tigers, may or may not work with elephants, and can even worsen the situation. Elephants that have been abused by humans in the past often become "rogue elephants", which regularly attack people with no provocation.

=== Poaching ===
==== For ivory ====
The demand for ivory during the 1970s and 1980s, particularly in East Asia, led to rampant poaching and the serious decline of elephants in both Africa and Asia. In Thailand, the illegal trade in live elephants and ivory still flourishes. Although the amount of ivory being openly sold has decreased substantially since 2001, Thailand still has one of the largest and most active black markets for ivory seen anywhere in the world. Tusks from Thai-poached elephants also enter the market; between 1992 and 1997 at least 24 male elephants were killed for their tusks.

Up to the early 1990s, Vietnamese ivory craftsmen used exclusively Asian elephant ivory from Vietnam and neighbouring Lao and Cambodia. Before 1990, there were few tourists and the low demand for worked ivory could be supplied by domestic elephants. Economic liberalisation and an increase in tourism raised both local and visitors' demands for worked ivory, which resulted in heavy poaching.

==== For skin ====
The skin of the Asian elephant is used as an ingredient in Chinese medicine as well as in the manufacture of ornamental beads. The practice has been aided by China's State Forestry Administration (SFA), which has issued licences for the manufacture and sale of pharmaceutical products containing elephant skin, thereby making trading legal. In 2010, four skinned elephants were found in a forest in Myanmar; 26 elephants were killed by poachers in 2013 and 61 in 2016. According to the NGO Elephant Family, Myanmar is the main source of elephant skin, where a poaching crisis has developed rapidly since 2010.

=== Disease ===
The elephant endotheliotropic herpesvirus (EEHV) is a member of the Proboscivirus genus, a novel clade most closely related to the mammalian betaherpesviruses. As of 2011, it is responsible for as many as 70 deaths of both zoo and wild Asian elephants worldwide, especially in young calves. In particular, several incidents of calves dying from elephant endotheliotropic herpesvirus have been recorded in Myanmar. The elephant schistosome is a parasitic trematode that uses the Asian elephant as a definitive host. Two other hosts may be the Indian elephant and the greater one-horned rhinoceros.

== Conservation ==
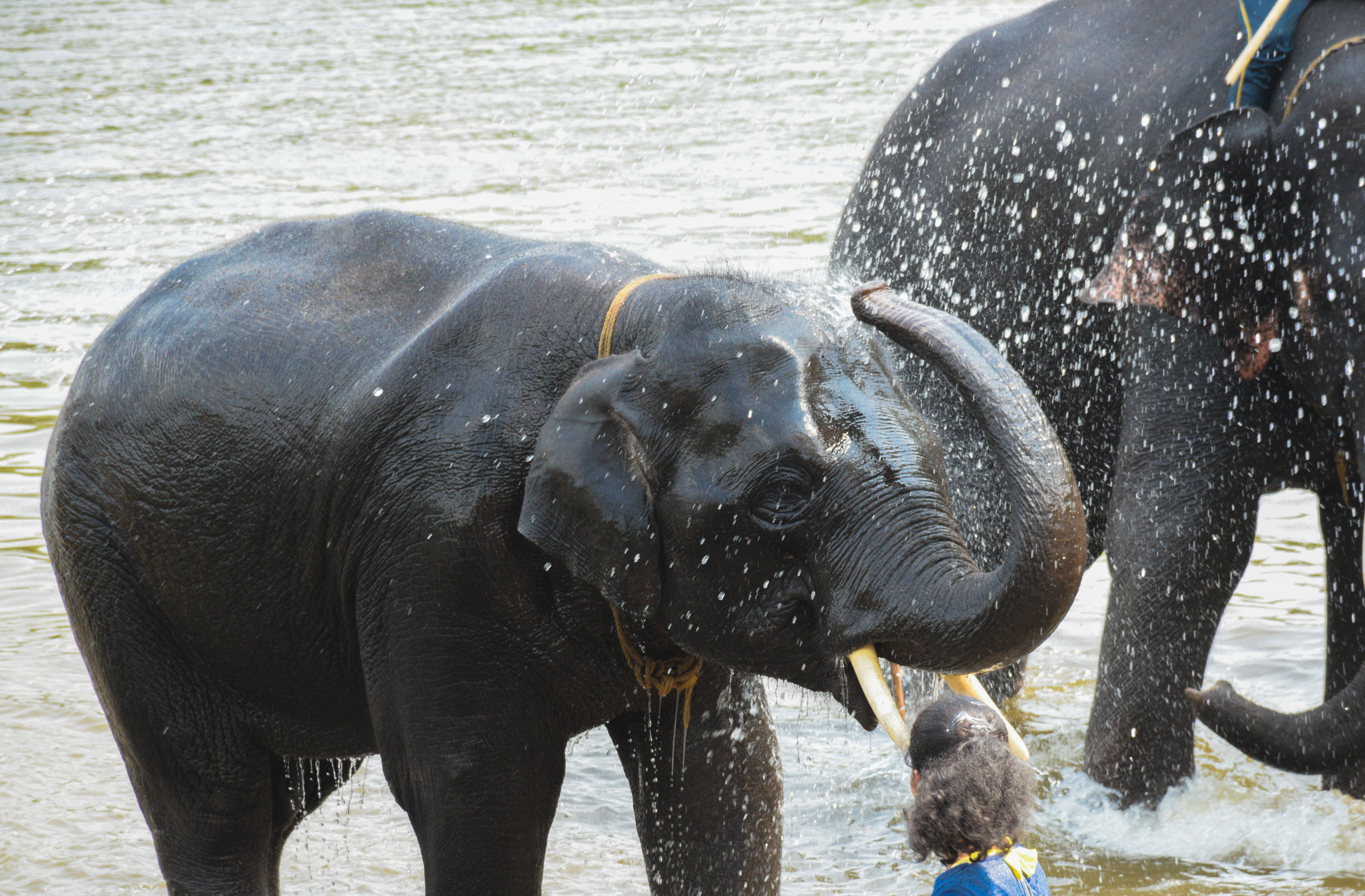
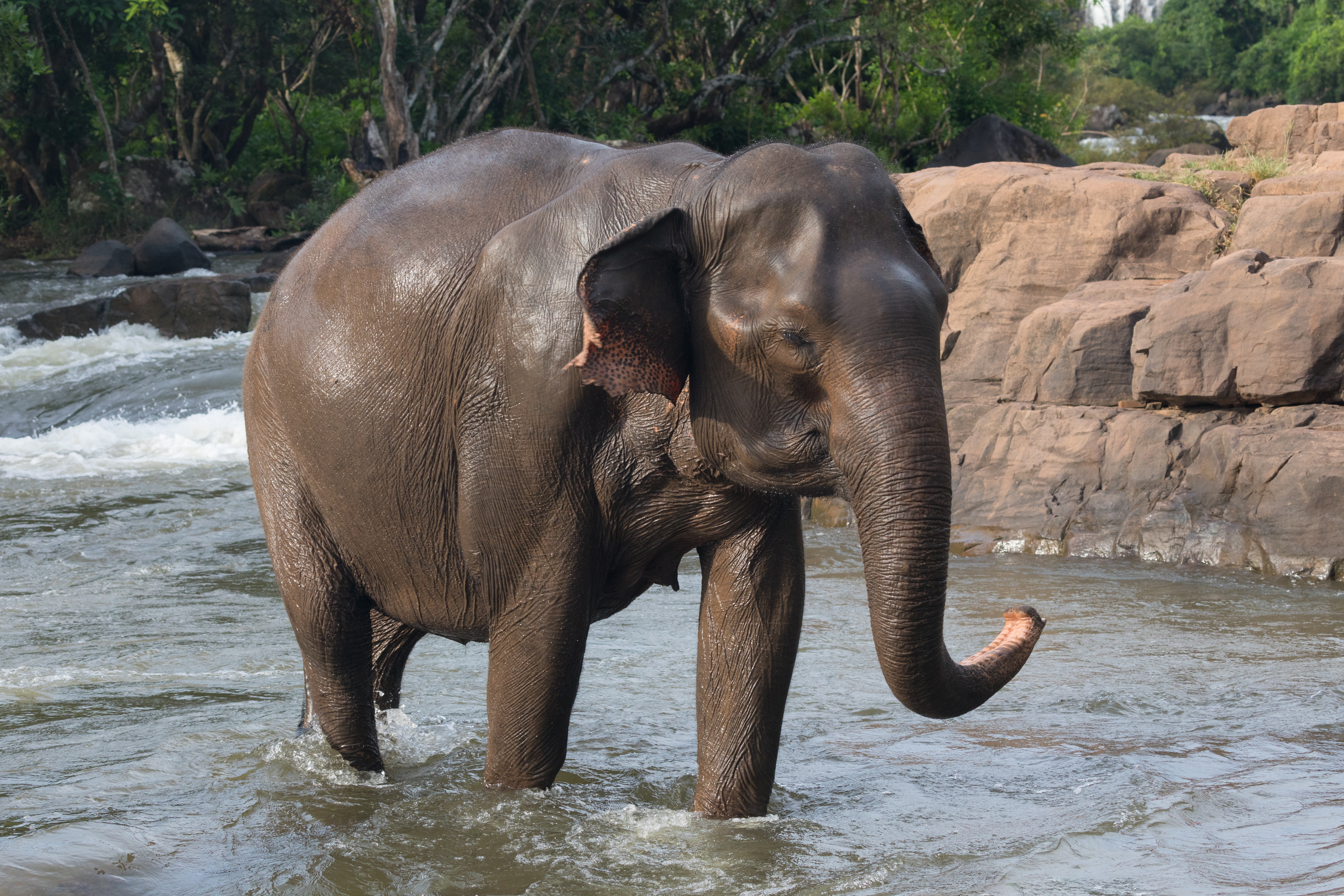
Asian elephants are protected across various geographies. Pictured are elephants in Mudumalai National Park in India (left) and Tad Lo river, Salavan Province, Laos (right)

The Asian elephant is listed on CITES Appendix I. It is a quintessential flagship species, deployed to catalyze a range of conservation goals, including habitat conservation at landscape scales, generating public awareness on conservation issues, and mobilisation as a popular cultural icon both in India and the West. A key aspect of conservation is connectivity of the preferred movement routes of Asian elephants through areas with high vegetation cover and low human population density.

The World Elephant Day is celebrated annually on 12 August since 2012. Events are organized to divulge information and to engage people about the problems that the Asian elephant is facing. August has been established as the Asian Elephant Awareness Month by zoos and conservation partners in the United States.

Karnataka state in India hosts the most Asian elephants of any known area, comprising around 20% of the total population in the country. The distribution of elephants in the state according to one estimate is roughly 38,310 km^{2} (14,790 sq mi). In a 2013 study, an estimated 10,000 elephants inhabited the Western Ghats, and were primarily threatened by poaching and habitat fragmentation. An increase in conflict with humans was also cited as a likely issue. Conservation plans aimed to establish wildlife corridors, stop poaching of bulls, and protect or manage land area. Project Elephant was initiated in 1992 as a Centrally Sponsored Scheme (CSS) by the Ministry of Environment, Forest and Climate Change of the Government of India. The project was initiated to protect the Indian elephant and its habitats and to establish dedicated elephant reserves for sustaining elephant populations.

The distribution of elephants in Sri Lanka is only two-fifths of what it was in the late 19th and early 20th centuries. Due to this decrease, interactions with humans occur much more frequently. During a 2003 survey, the local people expressed some form of disapproval towards the conservation of Asian elephants as farmers viewed them as pests, however, most of the participants were supportive of the idea.

In China, Asian elephants are under first-level protection. Yunnan province has 11 national and regional nature reserves. In total, the covered protected area in China is about 510,000 ha (1,300,000 acres). In 2020, the population of Asian elephants in Yunnan was estimated at around 300 individuals. As conflicts between humans and wild elephants have emerged around protected areas in the last years, the prefecture of Xishuangbanna built food bases and planted bananas and bamboo to create a better habitat.

In Thailand, Salakpra Wildlife Sanctuary and Tham Than Lot National Park are protected areas hosting around 250–300 elephants, according to figures from 2013. In recent years the National Park has faced issues due to encroachment and over-exploitation. In India, the National Board of Wildlife recommended to allow coal mining in Dehing Patkai National Park in April 2020. The decision raised concerns between students and environmental activists who launched an online campaign to stop the project.

== In captivity ==
Rhythmic swaying behaviour is not reported in free ranging wild elephants and may be symptomatic of psychological disorders.

About half of the global zoo elephant population is kept in European zoos, where they have less than half (18.9 years) the median life span of conspecifics (41.6 years) in protected populations in range countries. This discrepancy is clearest in Asian elephants: infant mortality is more than two to three times that seen in Burmese timber camps, and adult survivorship in zoos has not improved significantly in recent years. One risk factor for Asian zoo elephants is being moved between institutions, with early removal from the mother tending to have additional adverse effects. Another risk factor is being born into a zoo rather than being imported from the wild, with poor adult survivorship in zoo-born Asians apparently being conferred prenatally or in early infancy. Likely causes for compromised survivorship is stress and/or obesity. Foot problems are commonly observed in captive elephants. These are related to lack of exercise, long hours standing on hard substrates, and contamination resulting from standing in their dung. Many of these problems are treatable. However, mistreatment may lead to serious disability or death.

Demographic analysis of captive Asian elephants in North America indicates that the population is not self-sustaining. First year mortality is nearly 30 per cent, and fecundity is extremely low throughout the prime reproductive years. Data from North American and European regional studbooks from 1962 to 2006 were analysed for deviations in the birth and juvenile death sex ratios. Of 349 captive calves born, 142 died prematurely. They died within one month of birth, major causes being stillbirth and infanticide by either the calf's mother or by one of the exhibition mates. The sex ratio of stillbirths in Europe was found to have a tendency for excess of males.

=== Handling methods ===
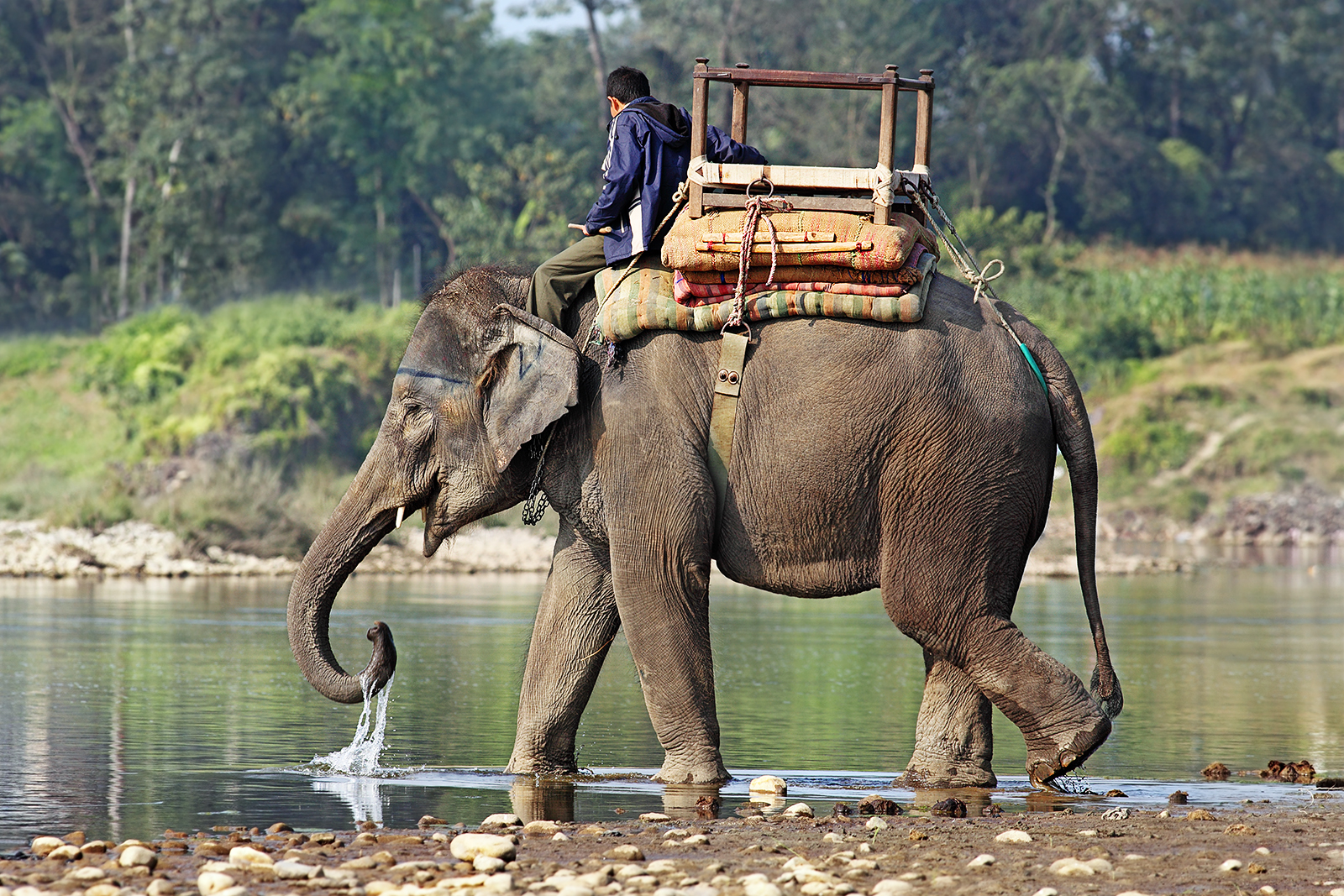
Elephants are used for safari tourism in some Asian countries

Young elephants are captured from the wild and illegally imported to Thailand from Myanmar for use in the tourism industry; calves are used mainly in amusement parks and are trained to perform various stunts for tourists. The calves are often subjected to a 'breaking in' process, which may involve being tied up, confined, starved, beaten and tortured; as a result, two-thirds may perish. Handlers use a technique known as the training crush, in which "handlers use sleep-deprivation, hunger, and thirst to 'break' the elephants' spirit and make them submissive to their owners"; moreover, handlers drive nails into the elephants' ears and feet.

== In culture ==
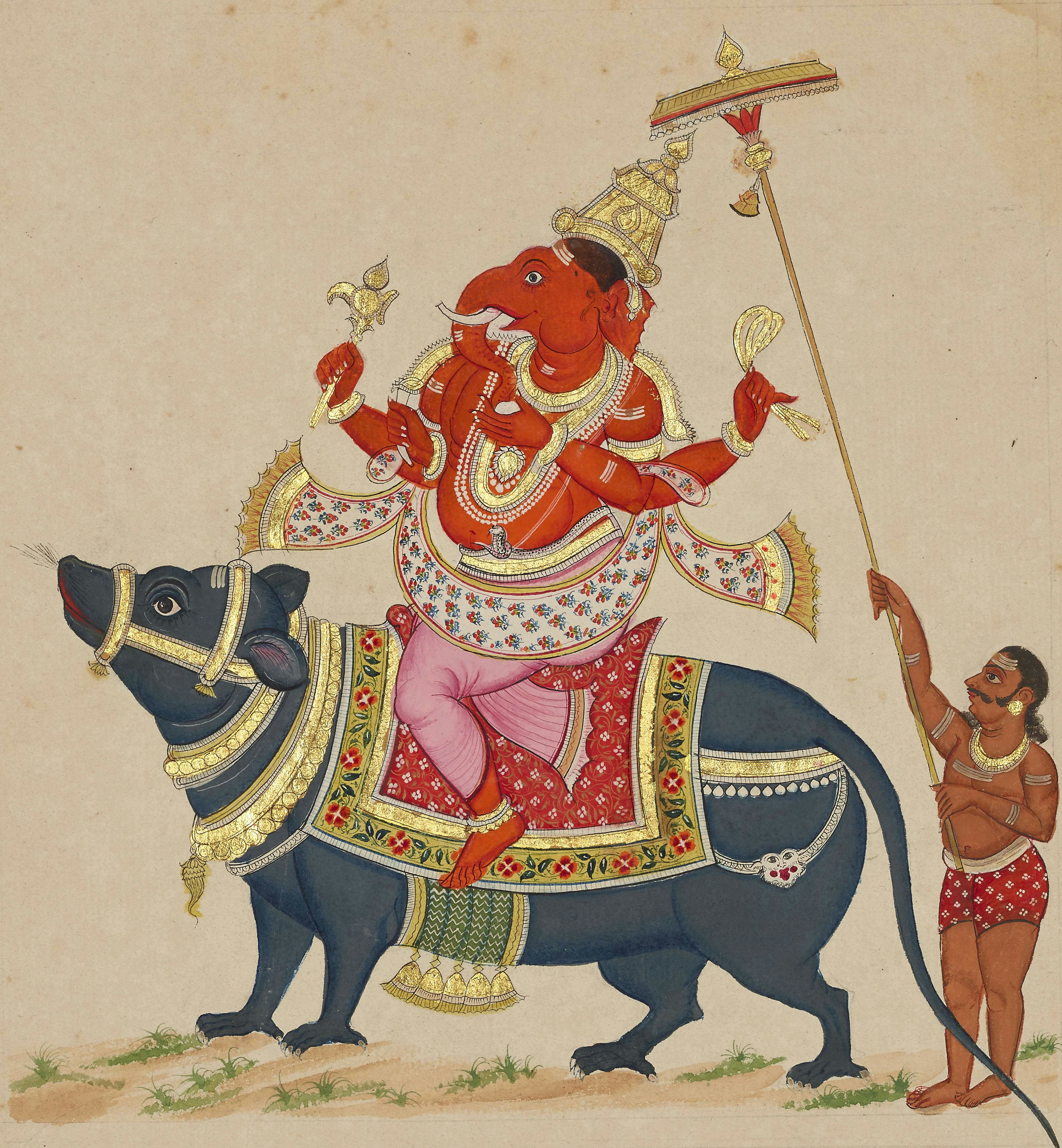
Ganesha on his vahana mūṣaka the rat, c. 1820

The Asian elephant is the national animal of Thailand and Laos. It has also been declared as the national heritage animal of India. Bones of Asian elephants excavated at Mohenjo-daro in the Indus Valley indicate that they were tamed in the Indus Valley Civilisation and used for work. Decorated elephants are also depicted on seals and were modelled in clay. The Asian elephant became a siege engine, a mount in war, a status symbol, a beast of burden, and an elevated platform for hunting during historical times in South Asia.

Asian elephants have been captured from the wild and tamed for use by humans. Elephants can remember tone, melody, and words, allowing them to recognise more than 20 verbal commands. Their ability to work under instruction makes them particularly useful for carrying heavy objects. They have been used particularly for timber-carrying in jungle areas. Other than their work use, they have been used in war, in ceremonies, and for carriage. It is reported that war elephants are still used by the Kachin Independence Army (KIA) in Kachin State in northern Myanmar against Myanmar's military. The KIA use about four dozen elephants to carry supplies.

The Asian elephant plays an important part in the culture of the subcontinent and beyond, being featured prominently in the Panchatantra fables and the Buddhist Jataka tales. They play a major role in Hinduism: the god Ganesha's head is that of an elephant, and the "blessings" of a temple elephant are highly valued. Elephants are frequently used in processions where the animals are adorned with festive outfits.

The Asian elephant is depicted in several Indian manuscripts and treatises with notable amongst these including Matanga Lila (elephant sport) of Nilakantha. The manuscript Hastividyarnava is from Assam in northeast India. In the Burmese, Thai and Sinhalese animal and planetary zodiac, the Asian elephant, both tusked and tuskless, are the fourth and fifth animal zodiacs of the Burmese, the fourth animal zodiac of the Thai, and the second animal zodiac of the Sinhalese people of Sri Lanka. Similarly, the elephant is the twelfth animal zodiac in the Dai animal zodiac of the Dai people in southern China.

== See also ==
- Elephants in Thailand
- Endangered species
- Ivory trade
- Khedda
- List of individual elephants
- Mela shikar
- War elephant
- White elephant
