= Elephas ekorensis =

Elephas ekorensis Temporal range: Early Pliocene

Scientific classification
- Domain: Eukaryota
- Kingdom: Animalia
- Phylum: Chordata
- Class: Mammalia
- Order: Proboscidea
- Family: Elephantidae
- Genus: Elephas
- Species: †E. ekorensis

Binomial name
- †Elephas ekorensis Maglio, 1970

Extinct species of mammal

Elephas ekorensis is an extinct species of elephant. Fossils have been found in East Africa. They date as far back as the Early Pliocene age, between 5 and 4.2 million years ago. It is the earliest species placed in the genus Elephas. It has been suggested to have been a grazer or mixed feeder (both browsing and grazing). Its placement in the genus of Elephas has been questioned, as the teeth are similar to those of the contemporaneous Loxodonta adaurora. A number of specimens assigned to it likely actually belong to other species.
