= Depigmentation =

Lightening of skin or loss of pigment

Depigmentation is the lightening of the skin or loss of pigment. Depigmentation of the skin can be caused by a number of local and systemic conditions. The pigment loss can be partial (e.g. injury to the skin) or complete (as in vitiligo). It can be temporary (e.g. from tinea versicolor) or permanent (e.g. from albinism).

== Skin whitening ==
Increasingly, people who are not afflicted with vitiligo experiment with low concentrations of monobenzone creams in the hope of lightening their skin tone evenly. Applied topically, monobenzone completely and permanently removes pigment, requiring lifelong adherence to sun safety to avoid severe sunburn and melanomas. People using monobenzone without previously having vitiligo do so because standard products containing hydroquinone or other lightening agents are not effective for their skin and due to price and active ingredient strength. However, monobenzone is not recommended for skin conditions other than vitiligo.

An alternate method involves the use of mequinol over an extended period of time. It leaves the skin looking extremely pale and unable to return to its original color, though tanning is still possible. It should not be used by people that are allergic to any ingredients, are pregnant, have dermatitis, have an increased number of white blood cells, are sensitive to sunlight, or must be outside for prolonged periods of time. It is used in Europe in concentrations ranging from 2–20% and is approved in many countries for the treatment of solar lentigines.

For stubborn pigmented lesions the Q-switched ruby laser, cryotherapy or trichloroacetic acid peels can be used to ensure the skin remains pigment-free.
