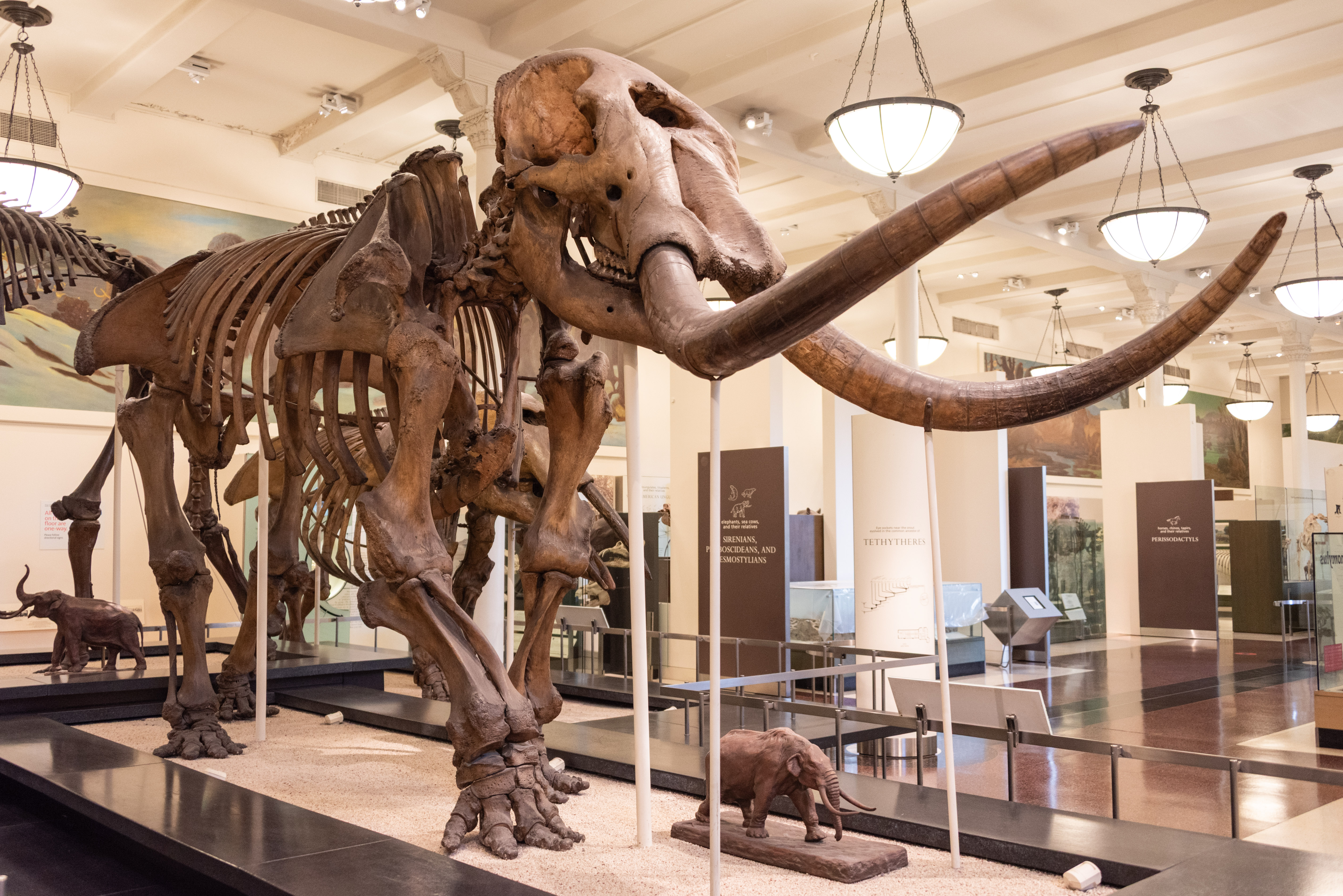
- Skeleton of the American mastodon Mammut americanum (Mammutidae)
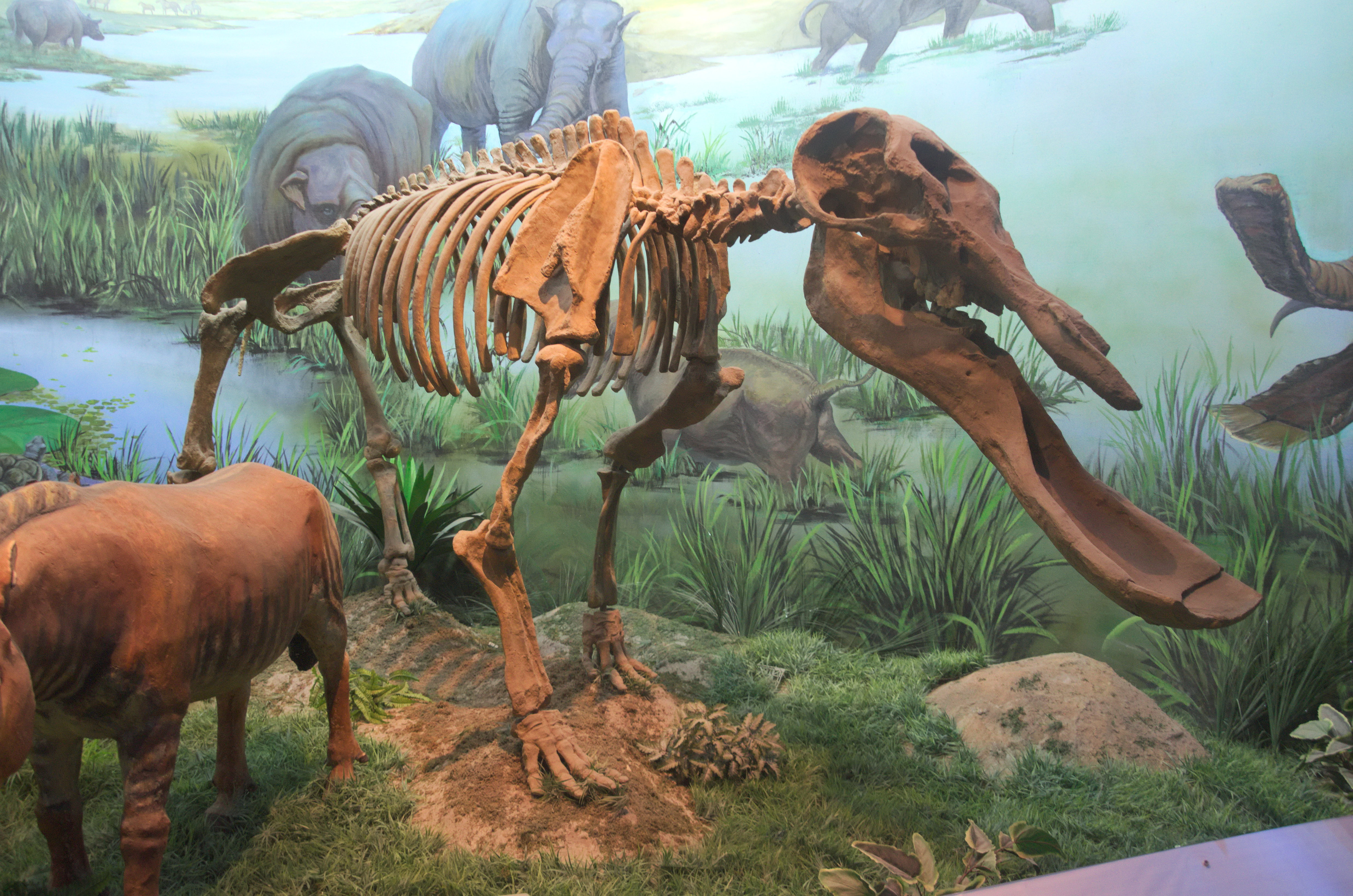
- Skeleton of the "shovel tusker" Platybelodon (Amebelodontidae)

Scientific classification
- Kingdom: Animalia
- Phylum: Chordata
- Class: Mammalia
- Infraclass: Placentalia
- Order: Proboscidea
- Suborder: Elephantiformes
- Clade: Elephantimorpha; Tassy & Shoshani, 1997

Subgroups
- †Mammutidae; †Stegodontidae (incertae sedis); Elephantida Tassy and Shoshani, 1997; †Eritreum; †Amebelodontidae; †Choerolophodontidae; †"Gomphotheriidae" (paraphyletic); Elephantoidea Gray, 1821; "Tetralophodont gomphotheres"; †Anancus; †Chesalophodon?; †Konobelodon?; †Paratetralophodon; †Pediolophodon?; †Tetralophodon; Elephantidae

= Elephantimorpha =

Elephantimorphs Temporal range: Oligocene–Recent

Clade of mammals

Elephantimorpha is a clade of proboscideans that contains the Mammutidae (true mastodons), as well as Elephantida, including amebelodonts, choerolophodonts, gomphotheres, stegodontids and elephantids. All members of Elephantimorpha have the horizontal tooth replacement typical of modern elephants, where the cheek teeth progressively migrate forwards in the jaw like a conveyor belt. This a distinctive characteristic of this group (synapomorphy) and is not found in more primitive non-elephantimorph Elephantiformes. Members of Elephantida are distinguished from mammutids by the reduced angular process of the lower jaw. Like modern elephants, the ancestor of Elephantimorpha was likely capable of communicating via infrasonic calls. While early elephantimorphs generally had lower jaws where the fused front part (the mandibular symphysis) was greatly elongated with well developed lower tusks/incisors, from the Late Miocene onwards, many groups convergently developed brevirostrine (shortened) lower jaws with vestigial or no lower tusks, probably corresponding with the elongation and increasingly dexterity of the trunk allowing it to be used as the primary feeding organ. The closest relatives of modern elephants within Elephantida, typically including Stegodontidae and the "tetralophodont gomphotheres" are placed as part of the clade Elephantoidea, though this clade has also been used historically as equivalent in scope to Elephantimorpha or Elephantida.

Non elephantid members of Elephantimorpha are sometimes informally referred to as "mastodonts".

== Taxonomy ==
Cladogram of Elephantiformes after Li et al. 2023, showing a paraphyletic Gomphotheriidae.

- Elephantimorpha
  - Mammutidae (mastodons)
  - Elephantida
    - Eritreum
    - Gomphotherium annectens
    - - Choerolophodontidae
      - - Amebelodontidae (shovel tuskers)
          - - Archaeobelodon filholi
            - Serbelodon barbourensis
          - - Protanancus brevirostris
            - - Protanancus wimani
              - - Eubelodon morrilli
                - Megabelodon lulii
            - - Protanancus macinnnesi
              - - Protanancus chinjiensis
                - - Amebelodon fricki
                  - Torynobelodon britti
            - - Platybelodon barnumbrowni
              - - Platybelodon danovi
                - - Platybelodon grangeri
                  - Aphanobelodon zhaoi
        - "Gomphotheriidae"
          - - Gomphotherium angustidens
            - - Gomphotherium steinheimense
              - Tetralophodon + Elephantidae
          - - Gomphotherium sylvaticum
            - - Gomphotherium inopinatum
              - - - Gomphotherium browni
                  - Gomphotherium tassyi
                - - Gomphotherium productum + American gomphotheres
