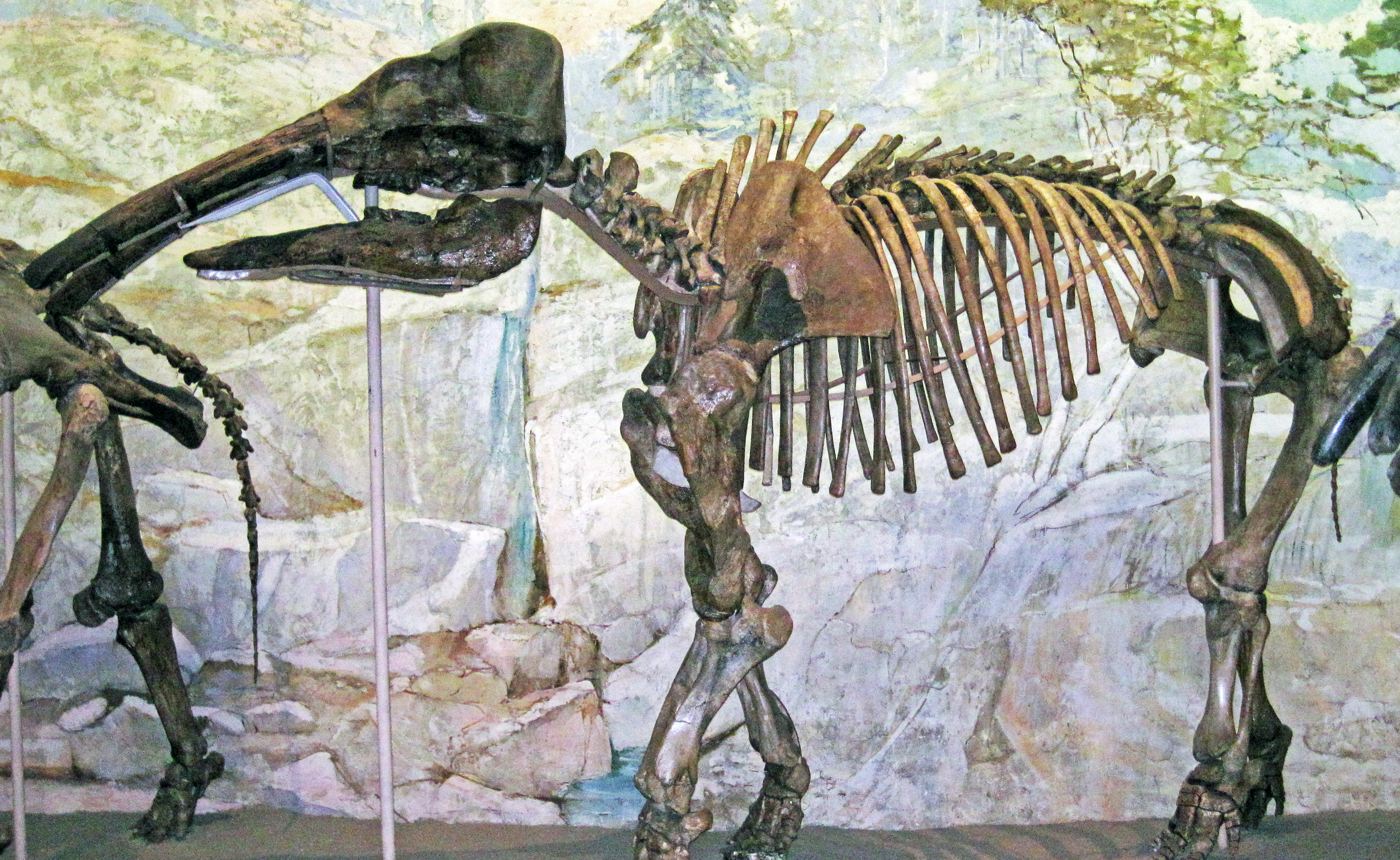
- Skeleton

Scientific classification
- Kingdom: Animalia
- Phylum: Chordata
- Class: Mammalia
- Order: Proboscidea
- Family: †Gomphotheriidae
- Genus: †Eubelodon; Barbour, 1914
- Species: †E. morrilli

Binomial name
- †Eubelodon morrilli Barbour, 1914

= Eubelodon =

Eubelodon Temporal range: Miocene, 15–10 Ma

Extinct genus of proboscid

Eubelodon is an extinct genus of gomphothere (a family in the order Proboscidea, which also includes modern elephants) which lived in North America during the Miocene Epoch. It contains a single species: Eubelodon morrilli.

== Description ==
Eubelodon is considered to be a trilophodont gomphothere. It has the highly unusual combination of retaining a long lower jaw, but having lost the lower tusks, a combination only shared with fellow North American gomphothere Gnathabelodon and the choerolophodontid Choerolophodon.

== Fossil distribution ==
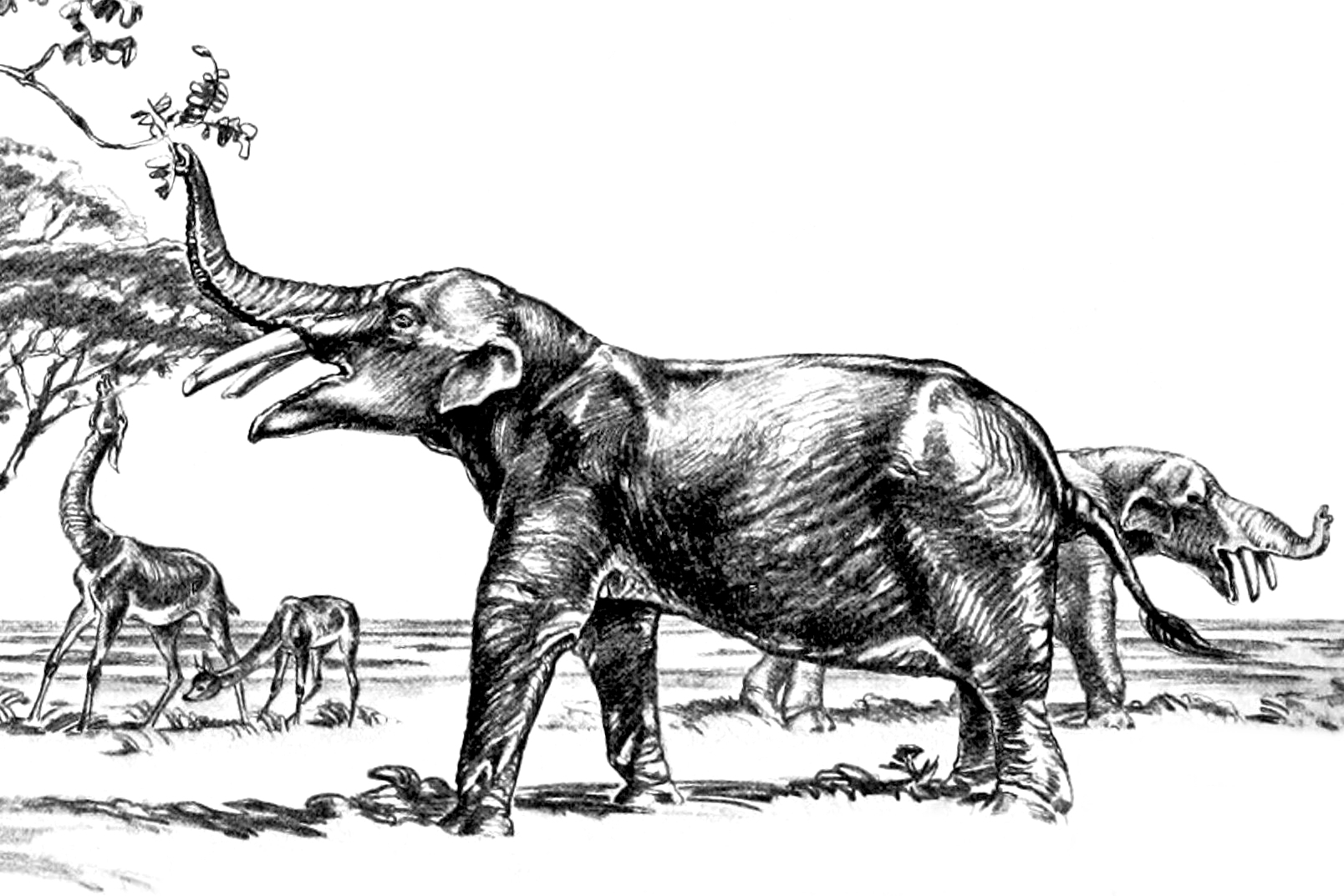
Restoration

Fossils are restricted to what is now the Great Plains of the United States. Remains were found in the Poison Ivy Quarry, Antelope, Brown County, Nebraska, and Tripp County, South Dakota.

== Taxonomy ==
Eubelodon was named by Erwin Hinckly Barbour in 1914. It was synonymized subjectively with Trilophodon by Osborn in 1918 and again by Tobien in 1973 with Gomphotherium.

It was assigned to Gomphotheriidae by Erwin Barbour in 1914. It was then assigned to Rhynchotheriinae by McKenna and Bell in 1997, Carroll in 1988, Shoshani and Tassy in 1996, Lambert and Shoshani in 1998, and Shoshani and Tassy in 2005.

A 2016 study assigned it to Gomphotheriidae. Cladogram showing its phylogenetic position according to Mothé et al. 2016:

- †Gomphotheriidae (Gomphotheres)
  - †Gomphotherium
  - - †Gnathabelodon
    - - †Eubelodon
      - Brevirostrine clade
        - †Stegomastodon
        - - †Sinomastodon
          - - †Notiomastodon
            - - †Rhynchotherium
              - †Cuvieronius

Some other studies have assigned it to Amebelodontidae. Cladogram after Li et al. 2023:

- Amebelodontidae
  - - Archaeobelodon filholi
    - Serbelodon barbourensis
  - - Protanancus brevirostris
    - - Protanancus wimani
      - - Eubelodon morrilli
        - Megabelodon lulii
    - - Protanancus macinnnesi
      - - Protanancus chinjiensis
        - - Amebelodon fricki
          - Torynobelodon britti
    - - Platybelodon barnumbrowni
      - - Platybelodon danovi
        - - Platybelodon grangeri
          - Aphanobelodon zhaoi
