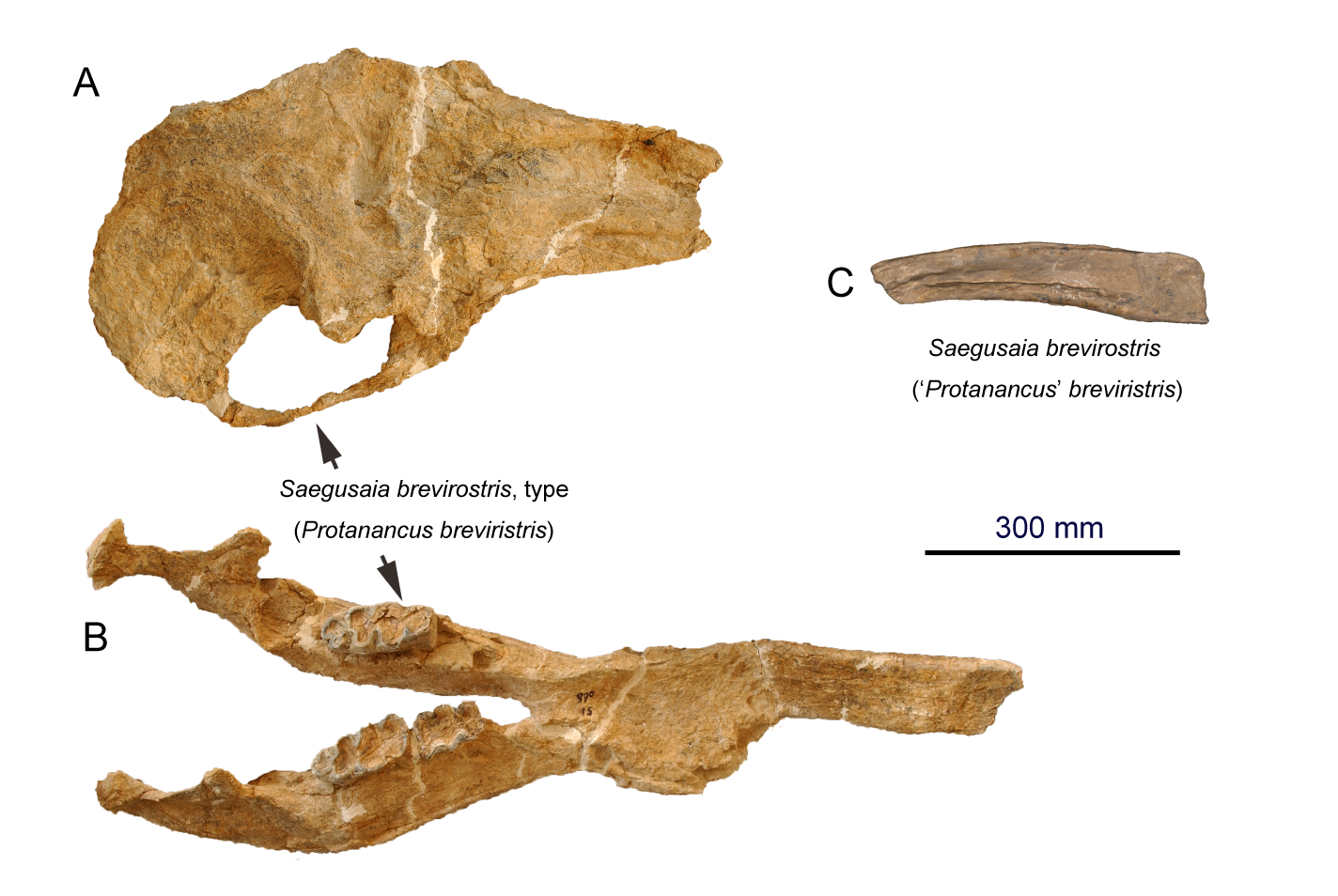
- Cranium, mandible, and mandibular tusk of S. brevirostris

Scientific classification
- Kingdom: Animalia
- Phylum: Chordata
- Class: Mammalia
- Infraclass: Placentalia
- Order: Proboscidea
- Clade: Elephantida
- Family: †Amebelodontidae
- Genus: †Saegusaia; Wang et al., 2025

Type species
- †Saegusaia brevirostris (Wang et al., 2015)

Other species
- †Saegusaia wimani (Hopwood, 1935)

= Saegusaia =

Saegusaia Temporal range: Early–Middle Miocene, 18–15 Ma

Extinct proboscidean mammal genus

Saegusaia (honoring H. Saegusa) is an extinct genus of proboscidean elephant-like mammals. The genus contains two species, both of which are known from China: the older Saegusaia brevirostris from the Early Miocene and the younger Saegusaia wimani from the Early–Middle Miocene. Both species have a complicated taxonomic history, having been previously assigned to various other genera, including Protanancus and Gomphotherium. Modern phylogenetic analyses place Saegusaia closer to Protanancus within the family Amebelodontidae, albeit it a more basal position, while Gomphotherium is part of a sister clade, Gomphotheriidae.

== History and classification ==
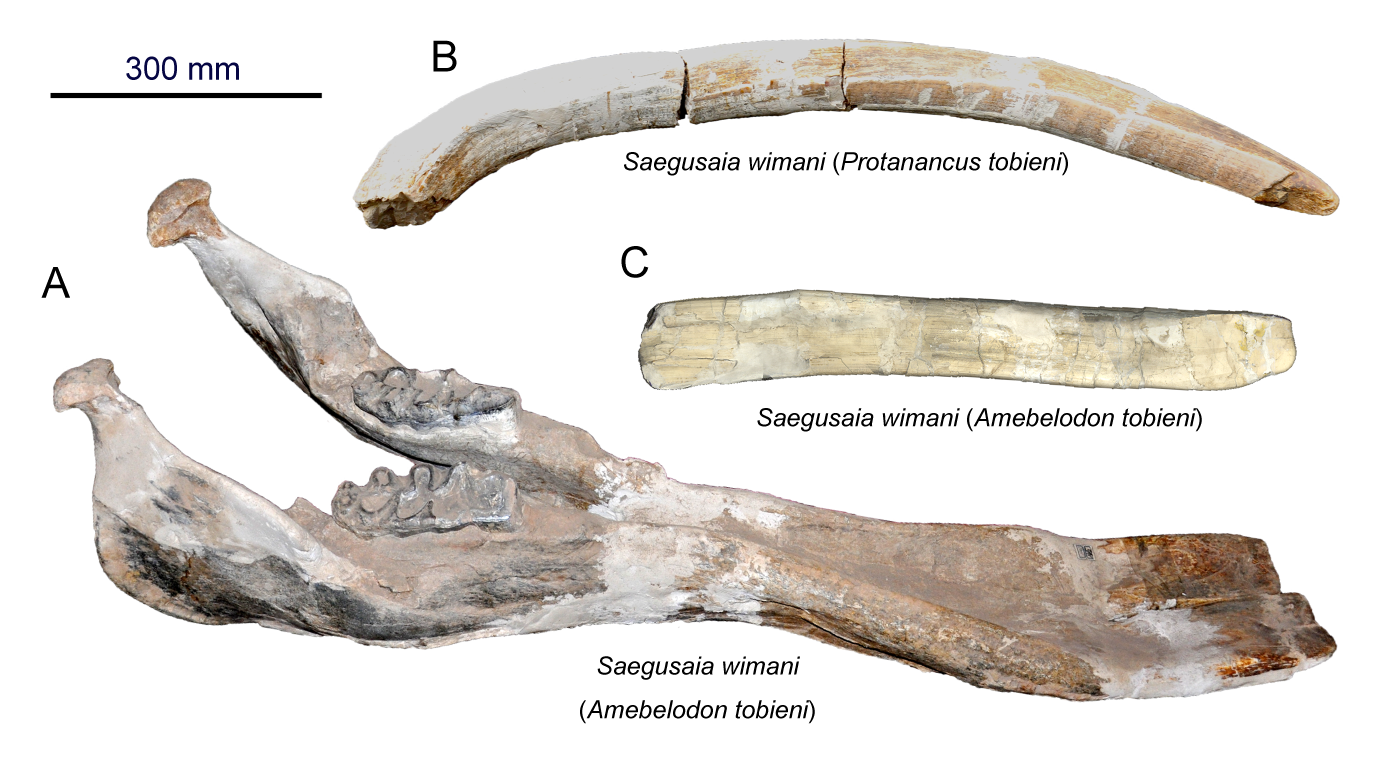
Mandible, upper tusk, and mandibular tusk of S. wimani

In a 2023 publication on the relevance of gomphotheres in biostratigraphy, Wang et al. noted that the species "Protanancus" brevirostris and "P." wimani demonstrated anatomy more ancestral than the Protanancus type species, P. macinnesi, as well as P. chinjiensis. As such, they argued that a new generic name was required for these species. In 2025, Wang et al. published a phylogenetic analysis of proboscideans focused on amebelodontids and closely allied taxa. Their results, displayed in the cladogram below, confirmed the earlier-diverging position of these species, and the authors proposed the new genus name Saegusaia for them.

- - 'Gomphotheriidae' (paraphyletic, ancestral to Elephantidae)
  - †Amebelodontidae
    - Serbelodon barbourensis
    - - Archaeobelodon spp.
      - - Eurybelodon shoshanii
        - - Saegusaia brevirostris
          - - Saegusaia wimani
            - - Amebelodontinae
              - Platybelodontinae
