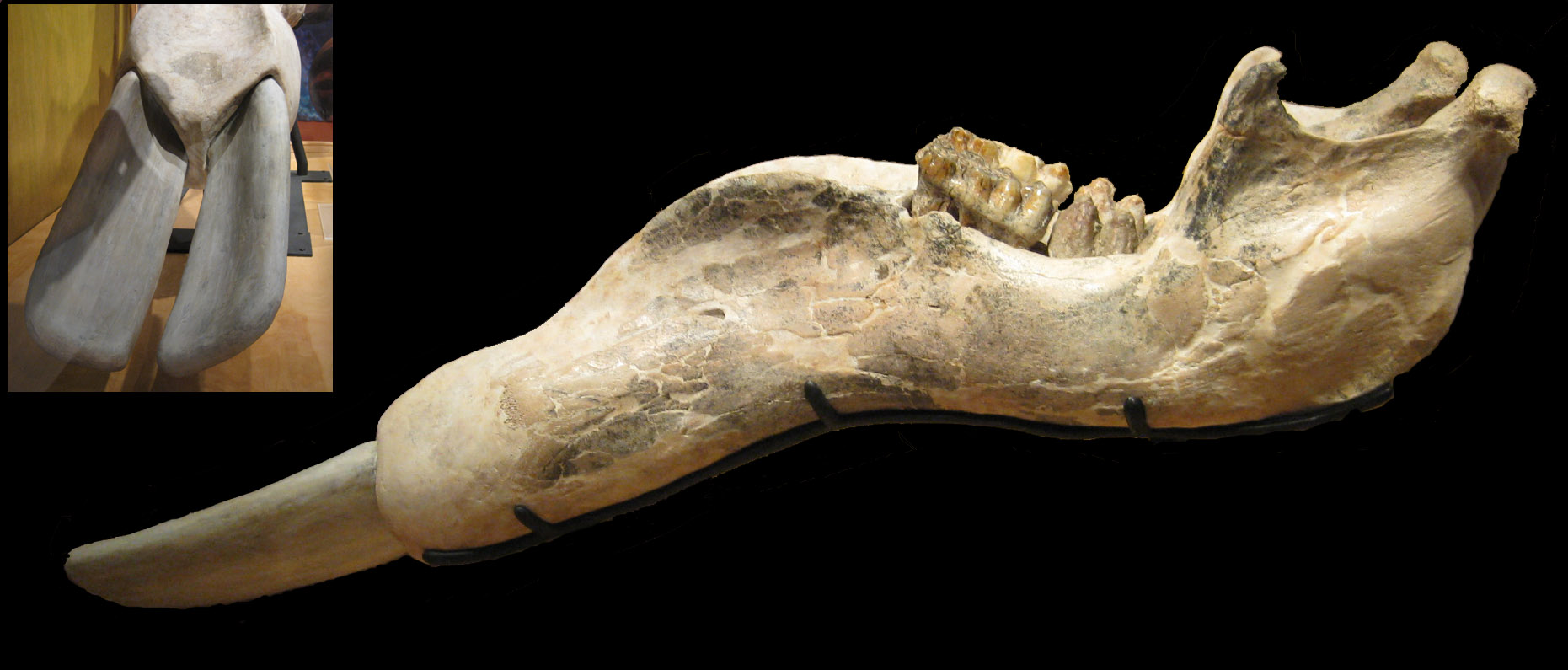
- Mandible of Konobelodon britti on display at the State Museum of Pennsylvania

Scientific classification
- Kingdom: Animalia
- Phylum: Chordata
- Class: Mammalia
- Infraclass: Placentalia
- Order: Proboscidea
- Family: †Amebelodontidae
- Genus: †Konobelodon; Lambert, 1990

Species
- K. atticus? (Wagner, 1857); K. britti (Lambert, 1990) (type); K. robustus? Wang, Shi, He, Chen, and Yang, 2016; K. cyrenaicus? (Gaziry, 1987)

= Konobelodon =

Konobelodon Temporal range: Miocene, 12–5.3 Ma

Extinct genus of mammals

Konobelodon is an extinct genus of amebelodont proboscidean from the Miocene of Africa, Eurasia and North America.

== Taxonomy ==
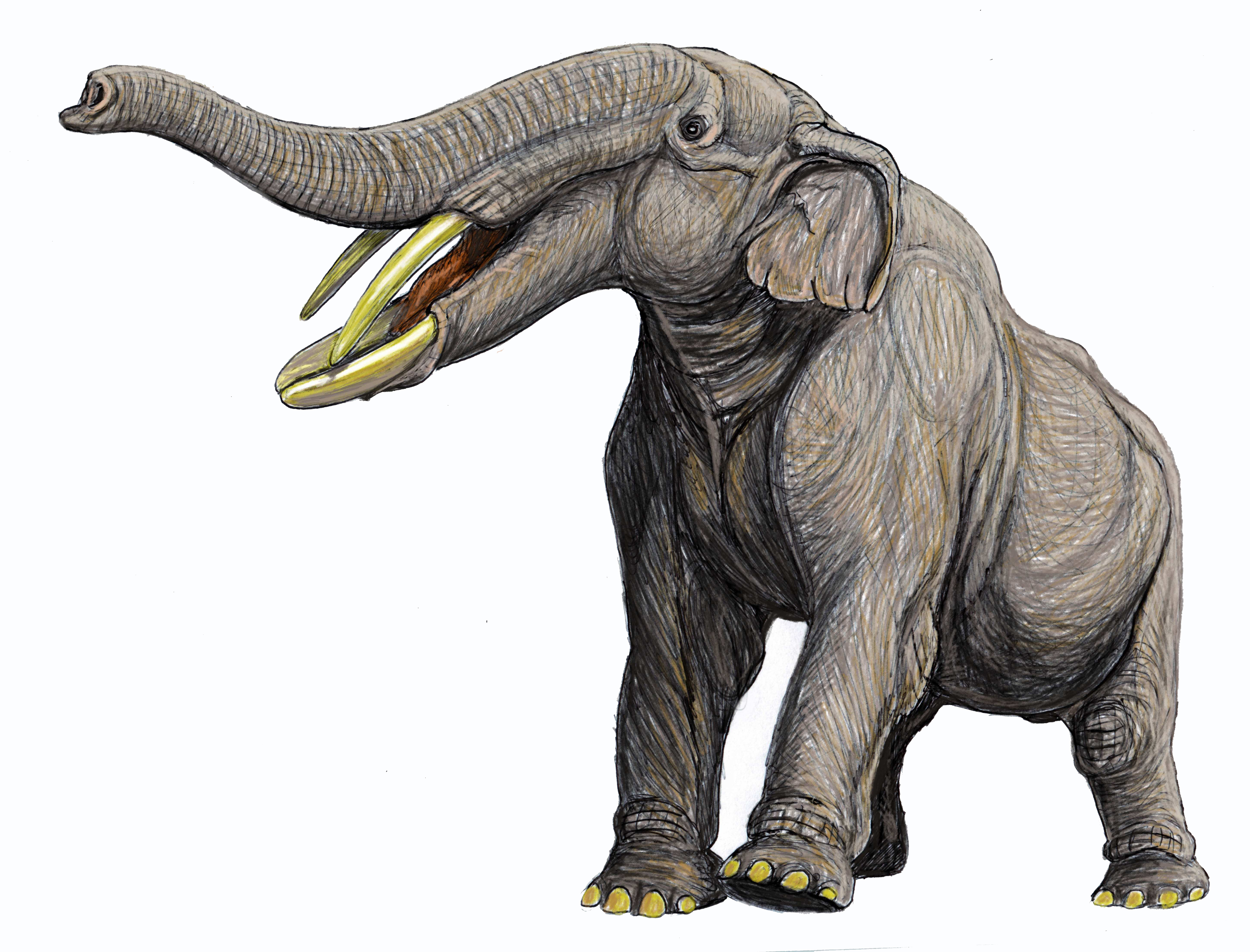
Life restoration of K. britti

Konobelodon was originally coined as a subgenus of Amebelodon, and was subsequently elevated to full generic rank in a 2014 re-appraisal of "Mastodon" atticus. Within Amebelodontinae, Konobelodon is closely related to Platybelodon and Torynobelodon. The genus Konobelodon has been suggested to have originated in eastern Eurasia, with K. robustus being known from the Liushu Formation in the Gansu Province of China. Under this hypothesis, it diverged via separate migrations westward into Europe and western Asia, represented by K. atticus, and eastward into North America, where the genus arrived c. 7 Ma and survived until the very end of the Miocene. The species K. cyrenaicus is known from the Late Miocene of North Africa, representing the latest surviving amebelodont on the African continent.

A 2025 study questioned the validity of Konobelodon, arguing the type species, the North American K. britti, was actually a member of the ambelodontid genus Torynobelodon, while the Eurasian species were not amebelodonts at all, but members of Elephantoidea closely related to Tetralophodon, Paratetralophodon, and by extension Elephantidae, rather than to Amebelodontidae.

== Description ==
As shovel-tusked amebelodonts, Konobelodon has two pairs of tusks, one growing from the upper jaw and a second from the lower. K. robustus is estimated to have had a body mass between 2,802–7,367 kg (6,177–16,241 lb), making it generally larger than most gomphotheres on account of its thicker limb bones. Its standing posture, however, was not likely as column-like as that of extant elephants and American brevirostrine gomphotheres. The lower tusks were proportionally large, reaching 1.61 m (5 ft 3 in) in length.

== Ecology ==
Konobelodon is suggested to have been a browser, based on dental microwear analysis. The upper tusks were likely used for slicing and scraping, while the lower tusks may have been used for digging.
