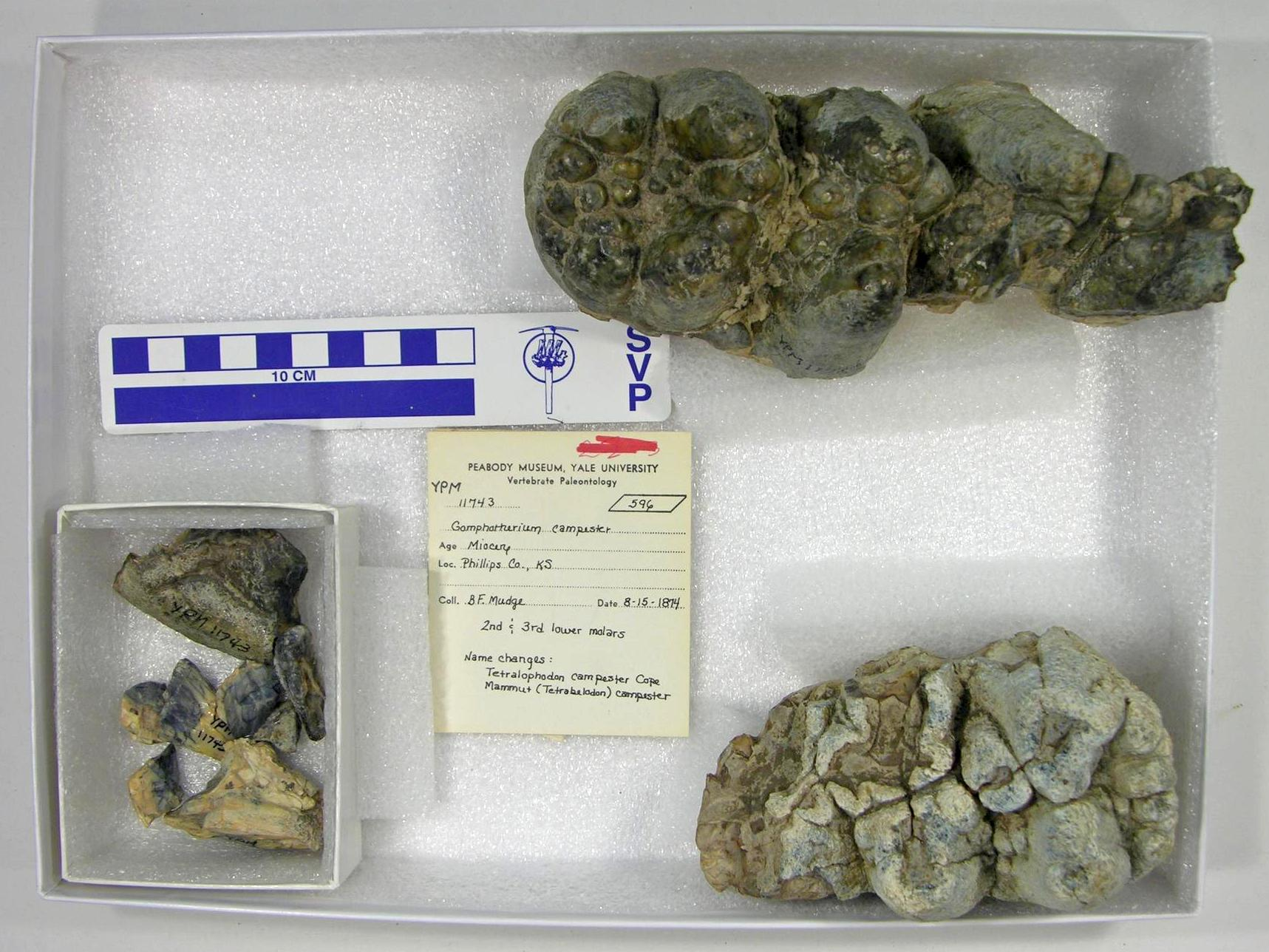
- Fossilized teeth of Pediolophodon campester

Scientific classification
- Kingdom: Animalia
- Phylum: Chordata
- Class: Mammalia
- Order: Proboscidea
- Clade: Elephantida
- Genus: †Pediolophodon; Lambert, 2007

Type species
- Tetralophodon campester Cope, 1877

Other species
- Pediolophodon fricki (Osborn, 1936)

= Pediolophodon =

Pediolophodon Temporal range: Serravallian-Tortonian

Extinct genus of elephants

Pediolophodon is an extinct elephantidan proboscidean genus from the middle to late Miocene of North America (Nebraska and Texas). Two species are recognized, P. campester and P. fricki. Both were originally assigned to the Old World genus Tetralophodon, but discoveries in the Kepler Quarry, Nebraska, showed these taxa to be generically distinct. W. David Lambert in 2007 suggested that Pediolophodon was a member of the family Gomphotheriidae and had evolved from Gomphotherium, with its similarities to Tetralophodon a result of evolutionary convergence. A 2025 study alternately suggested that Pediolophodon was a member of the family Amebelodontidae, and that the type species. P. campester actually represented a species of Torynobelodon, while "P." fricki represented a species of another amebelodontid, Amebelodon.
