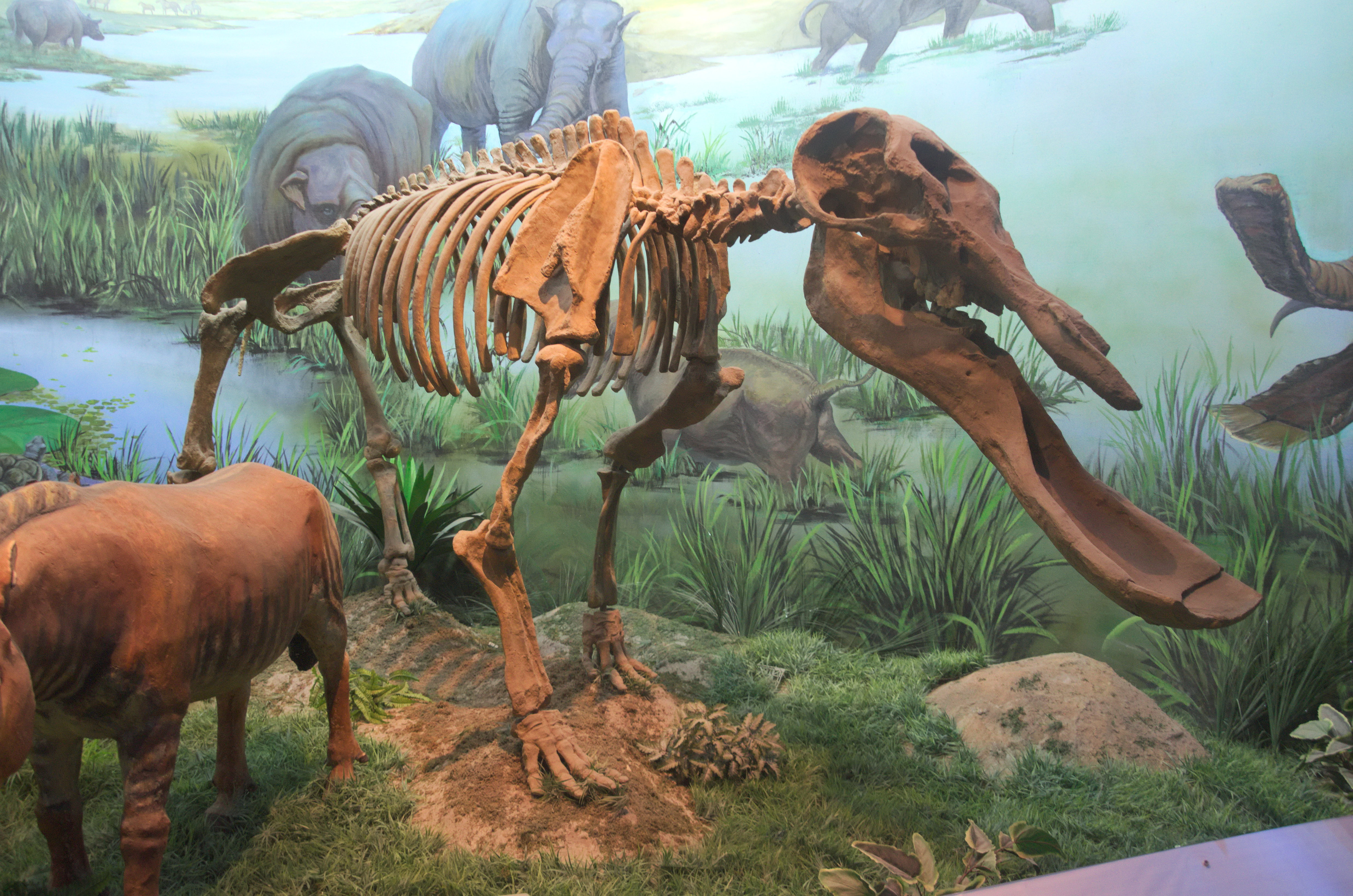
- Platybelodon grangeri skeleton, Inner Mongolia Museum

Scientific classification
- Kingdom: Animalia
- Phylum: Chordata
- Class: Mammalia
- Order: Proboscidea
- Family: †Amebelodontidae
- Subfamily: †Platybelodontinae
- Genus: †Platybelodon; Borissiak, 1928

Type species
- †Platybelodon danovi Borissiak, 1928

Species
- P. grangeri Osborn, 1929; P. beliajevae Alexeeva, 1971; P. tongxinensis Chen, 1978; P. dangheensis Wang and Qiu, 2002; P. tetralophus Wang and Li, 2022

= Platybelodon =

Platybelodon Temporal range: Miocene, 15–10 Ma

Extinct genus of large herbivorous proboscidean mammals

Platybelodon (possibly "shovel tooth", or "flat tusk") is an extinct genus of amebelodontid proboscidean mammal, distantly related to modern-day elephants. Fossils are known from middle Miocene strata from parts of Asia and the Caucasus. The first specimens of Platybelodon, consisting of a partial skull, a nearly complete lower jaw, and multiple disarticulated remains, were discovered in the Tchokrak beds of north Caucasus, in the summer of 1927. The following year, Russian palaeontologist Alexey Borissiak described the remains, giving them the name Platybelodon danovi (now the type species of the genus). Several additional species have been described, including Platybelodon grangeri, named by Henry Fairfield Osborn in 1928.

Platybelodon is best known for its elongated, spoon-shaped lower jaw. While its upper incisors formed a pair of long, slender tusks (which were larger in males), the lower incisors instead formed flat, broad tusks, as in other amebelodontids. While initially suggested to be an adaptation for feeding on water plants, tooth wear patterns suggest that Platybelodon instead used its lower tusks to remove bark from trees and for cutting vegetation. Similarly, while originally believed to lack a trunk and to instead have a large upper lip similar to that of a hippopotamus, Platybelodon had a fairly large trunk which was likely used to grasp tree branches and other vegetation. While bones from the postcranial skeleton are rare, limb elements suggest that Platybelodon was more lightly built and possibly more agile than many other proboscideans.

== Taxonomy ==
=== History of discovery ===
In the summer of 1927, the remains of a proboscidean were recovered from the Miocene-age Tchokrak beds of the Kuban region (north Caucasus). The remains were fragmentary, consisting of the partial skull and a nearly complete mandible (lower jaw) of one specimen, and a few disarticulated teeth and bones of others. On 4 April 1928, Russian palaeontologist Alexey Borissiak briefly described the remains, assigning to them the binomial name Platybelodon danovi. A year after his initial description, Borissiak published a more detailed diagnosis of the relevant specimens. Borissiak believed that P. danovi represented a new branch of mastodonts, subsequently erecting a subfamily which he dubbed Platybelodontinae.

On 28 July 1928, during the Central Asiatic Expeditions to Mongolia, Roy Chapman Andrews and Walter W. Granger came upon a series of mandibles and teeth in the Tung Gur locality (now the Tunggur Formation). The following year, Henry Fairfield Osborn assigned them to Platybelodon, assigning to them the name Platybelodon grangeri, after Granger. AMNH 26202, the partial mandible of an adult, was designated as the type specimen.

In 1960, E. I. Beliajeva and L. K. Gabunia named a new species of Platybelodon, P. jamandzhalgensis, based on the mandible of a juvenile individual from the same locality as the P. danovi type. Thirteen years later, it was synonymised with P. danovi by Heinz Tobien. In 1971, L. I. Alexeeva described a third species of Platybelodon, P. beliajevae, based on several molars recovered from the Oshi locality in western Mongolia.

A fourth species, P. tongxinensis, was described in 1978 by G. F. Chen, based on two molars from the Zhangenbao Formation in Tongxin County, China. While briefly synonymised with P. danovi, a 2022 paper by Shiqi Wang and Chun-Xiao Li reaffirmed its validity and attributed specimens formerly assigned to Gomphotherium to it. A fifth Platybelodon species, P. tetralophus, was named in the same paper, based on a partial mandible. Multiple specimens known from the Platybelodon Quarry of the Tunggur Formation, and some in the collection of the American Museum of Natural History from the Wolf Camp Quarry, were assigned to P. tetralophus. An as-yet unnamed species is known from Loperot, Kenya.

=== Classification ===
The taxonomy of Platybelodon, and of amebelodontids as a whole, has been a matter of debate. Some studies recover amebelodonts as a monophyletic family, forming a sister group to gomphotheres. Others, however, suggest that amebelodonts are an unnatural assemblage of gomphotheres which independently evolved a "shovel-tusked" tooth morphology. In 2023, Chunxiao Li and colleagues recovered a monophyletic Amebelodontidae. In their tree, Platybelodon formed a clade with Amebelodon, Aphanobelodon, Protanancus, and Torynobelodon, and Gomphotheriidae was a paraphyletic clade ancestral to elephantids.

The below cladogram reflects the results of Li and colleagues, 2023.

- Elephantida (gomphotheres sensu lato)
  - Choerolophodontidae
  - - "Gomphotheriidae" (paraphyletic, ancestral to Elephantidae)
    - Amebelodontidae
      - - Archaeobelodon filholi
        - Serbelodon barbourensis
      - - Protanancus brevirostris
        - - Protanancus wimani
          - - Eubelodon morrilli
            - Megabelodon lulii
        - - Protanancus macinnnesi
          - - Protanancus chinjiensis
            - - Amebelodon fricki
              - Torynobelodon britti
        - - Platybelodon barnumbrowni
          - - Platybelodon danovi
            - - Platybelodon grangeri
              - Aphanobelodon zhaoi

Alternate tree of Amebelodontinae, after Wang and colleagues, 2025:

- Amebelodontidae
  - Serbelodon barbourensis
  - - Archaeobelodon
    - - Saegusaia brevirostris
      - - Saegusaia wimani
        - - Amebelodontinae
            - Afromastodon
            - - Megabelodon lulli
              - Eubelodon morrilli
            - - Protanancus macinnesi
              - Protanancus chinjiensis
              - - Amebelodon floridanus
                - Amebelodon fricki
                - Torynobelodon campester'
          - Platybelodontinae
            - "Platybelodon" barnumbrowni
            - - Aphanobelodon zhaoi
              - - Platybelodon danovi
                - Platybelodon tongxinensis
                - Platybelodon dangheenensis
                - - Platybelodon grangeri
                  - Platybelodon tetralophus

=== Etymology ===
The full etymology of Platybelodon is obscure. In a paper attempting to translate the generic names of various extinct proboscideans into Chinese, Shi-Qi Wang, Chun-Xiao Li, and Xiao-Xiao Zhang divided the genus name into the Greek platy ("wide"), bel (presumably "shovel", which they supposed was in reference to the shape of its incisors), and don ("tooth"); thus they suggested that the name in full may translate to either "shovel tooth", "broad tooth", or "plate tooth". In 2026, Asier Larramendi and Marco P. Ferreti suggested that Platybelodon may translate to "flat tusk".

== Description ==
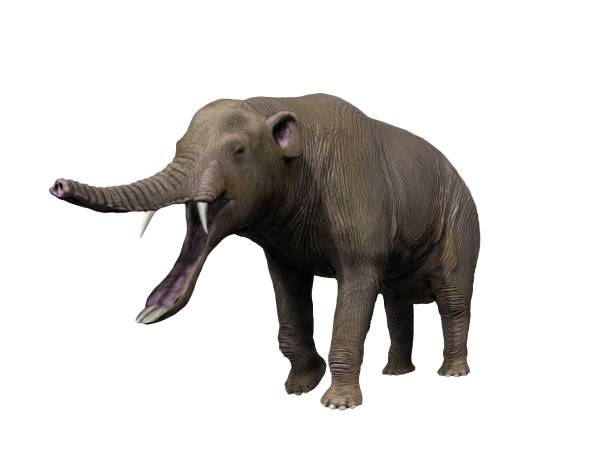
Life reconstruction of Platybelodon

Platybelodon was a fairly small proboscidean, being far smaller than North American taxa such as Amebelodon; though its precise dimensions are unclear, female P. grangeri may have stood ~180 cm (71 in) at the shoulder, while males may have stood ~220 cm (87 in). In 2026, Asier Larramendi and Marco P. Ferreti estimated based on comparisons with modern proboscideans that P. grangeri females may have weighed ~1,500 kg (3,300 lb), while males may have had a body mass of ~2,700 kg (6,000 lb). While fragmentary, Larramendi and Ferreti suggested that P. beliajevae was the largest species, weighing ~3,500 kg (7,700 lb) and standing 240 cm (94 in) at the shoulder.

=== Skull and dentition ===
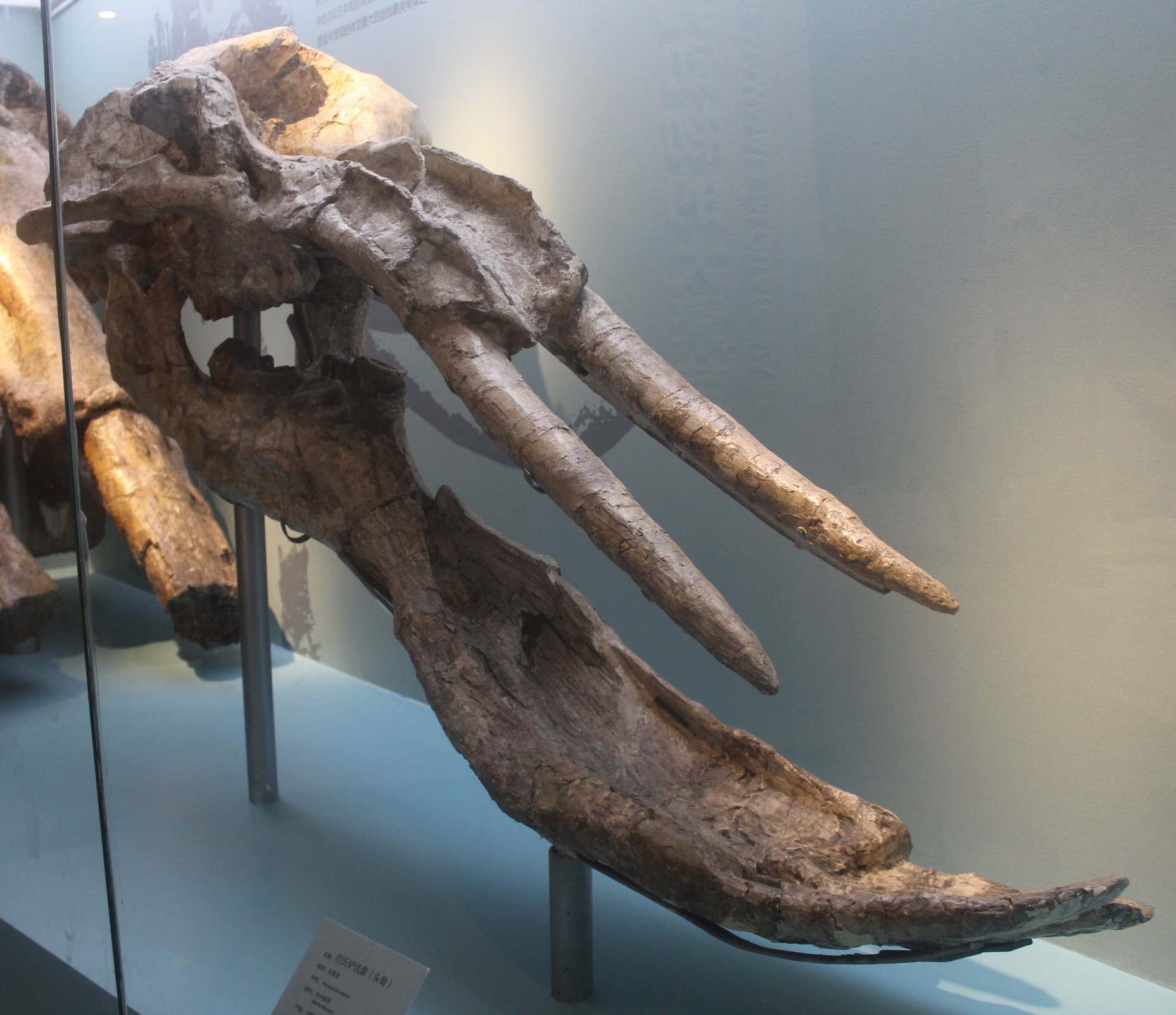
Skull of P. danovi at the National Natural History Museum of China

The skull of Platybelodon grangeri, measured from the occipital border, is 88.2 cm (34.7 in) in length in a female specimen, HMV0023, and 110.7 cm (43.6 in) in length in a male specimen, HMV0940. The facial skeleton of Platybelodon was flat and wide, particularly towards the front. The premaxilla of HMV0940 measured 87.7 cm (34.5 in) in length. On the dorsal surface of the premaxilla is a rough surface, to which the maxillo-labialis (the principal motor muscles of the trunk in proboscideans) would have attached. While it was initially suggested that a trunk was absent in Platybelodon, and that a hippopotamus-like upper lip was present instead, it seems likely that one was not only present, but increased in size throughout the genus' history. In males, this rough surface is broader than in females and juveniles; this, in conjunction with more posterior (rearward) nasal bones, suggests that males had a stronger trunk. The neurocranium (braincase) in Platybelodon was low and very elongated. The palate was extremely long and thin, and arched slightly upward. The external nares, the opening for the nose, was wide and low, somewhat elliptical in shape. In males, the postorbital processes were very large, resulting in a broad and short dorsal table to the neurocranium; in females and juveniles, these processes were smaller, and the dorsal table was long and narrow. Platybelodon's mandible is very long, exceeding the skull in length. Laterally (from the side), the body of the mandible was deep, steeply descending beyond the anterior (front) border of cheek teeth to form a wide, spoon-shaped mandibular symphysis. The symphysis of P. danovi was more slender than that of P. grangeri.

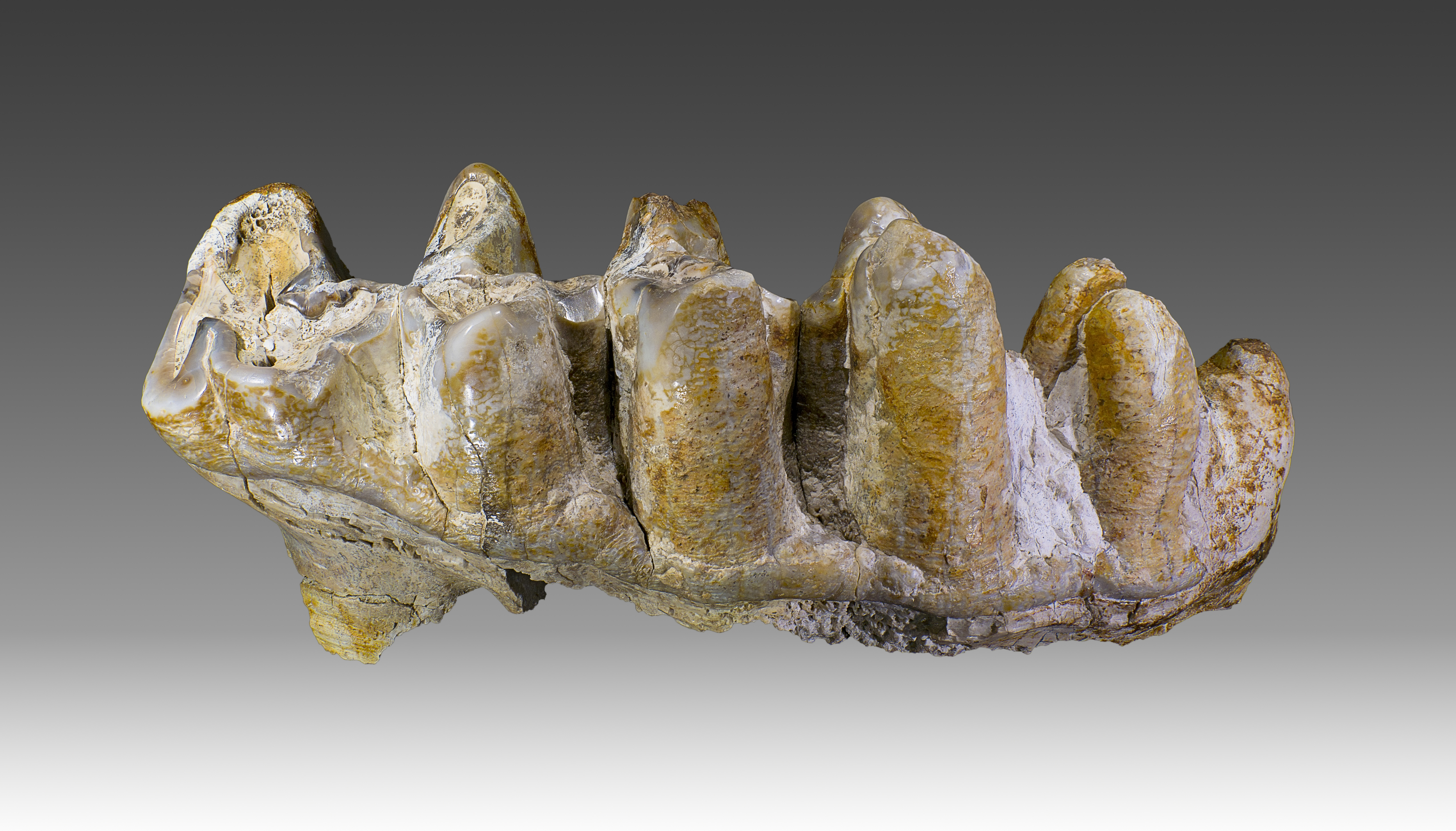
Molar of P. grangeri

Platybelodon's inner pair of upper incisors were very reduced, and did not reach the front of the jaw. The second pair was large, forming a set of long, slender tusks, rounded in cross-section and covered in a thick enamel layer. The lower incisors formed large, flat tusks, measuring 11 cm (4.3 in) at their widest. The width of these tusks exceeds that observed in other amebelodont genera. Like Torynobelodon, but unlike all other amebelodonts, these lower tusks had dentin tubules, microscopic channels running from the pulp to the enamel border. The cheek teeth of Platybelodon, the premolars and molars, were bunolophodont, having rounded cusps and prominent ridges running transversely along (across) their occlusal surfaces. The second premolars of both the upper and lower jaws were very reduced.

=== Postcranial skeleton ===
Postcranial elements (the skeleton minus the skull) from Platybelodon are scarce. The pes (hind foot) of an adult specimen, assigned to P. danovi, suggests that most of its weight was supported by the fourth metatarsal, similar to certain artiodactyls. Such a shift indicates an unusual standing posture compared to other proboscideans, and that Platybelodon may have been more lightly built and moved relatively quickly. Additional postcranial elements, such as a manus (front foot) and several other limb bones, are known (though undescribed), and further support this hypothesis.

== Palaeobiology ==
=== Ecology ===
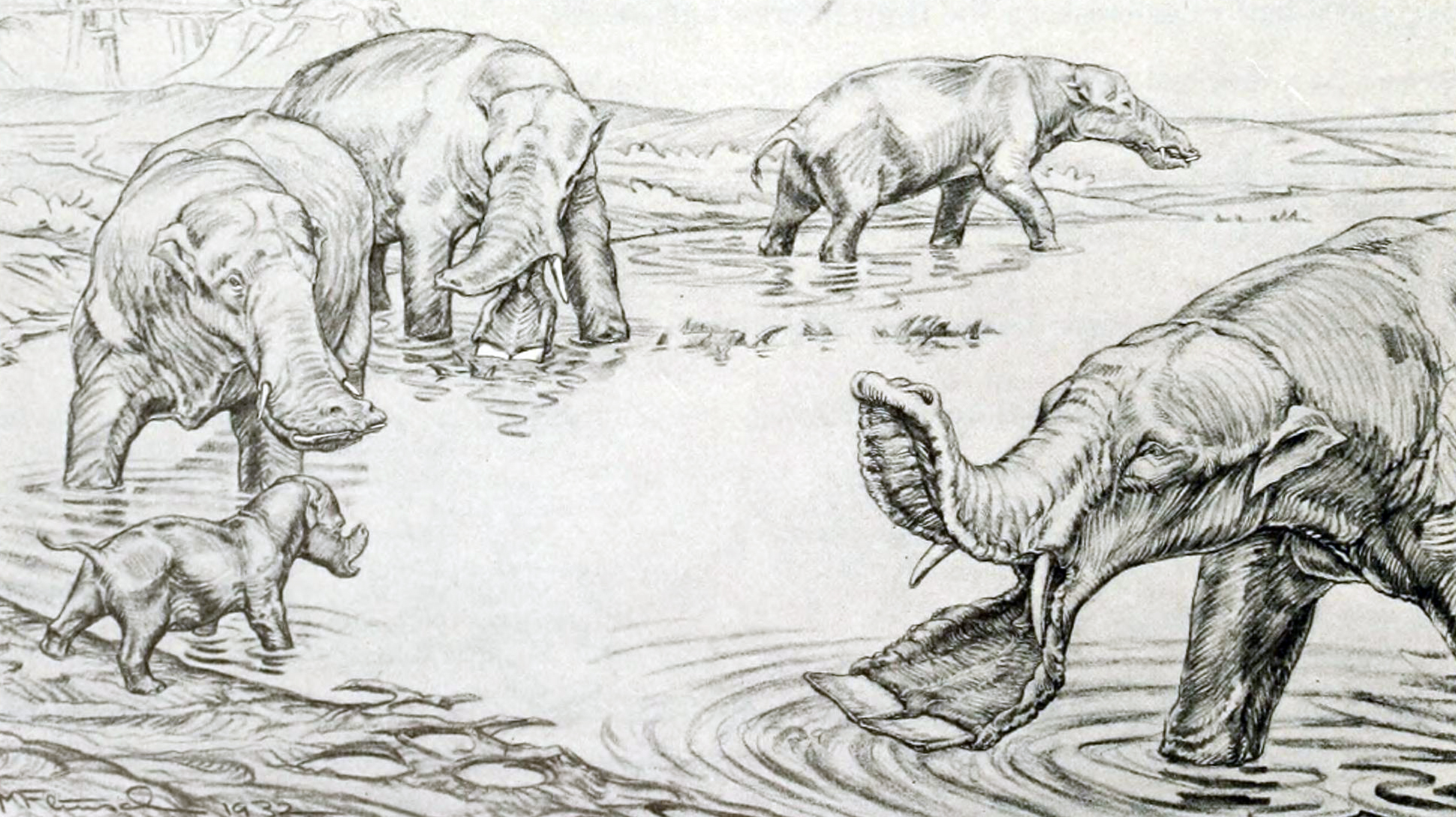
Outdated 1932 restoration of P. grangeri as a swamp-dweller.

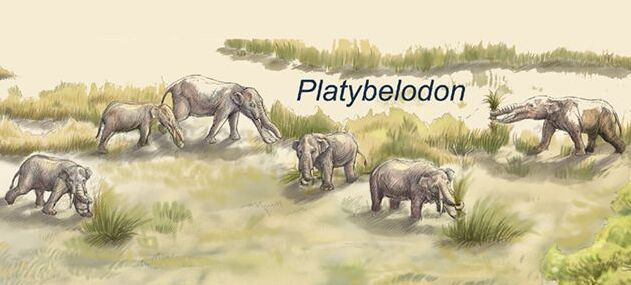
Modern restoration of a herd of Platybelodon feeding in an open landscape

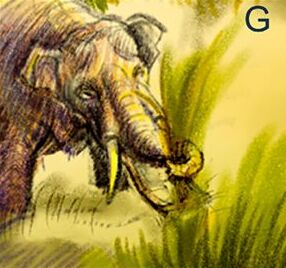
Reconstruction of Platybelodon feeding on grass, using its trunk to hold the grass blades while cutting them using their blade-like lower tusks

Platybelodon was originally believed to have fed in the swampy areas of grassy savannas, using its teeth to shovel up aquatic and semi-aquatic vegetation. Borissiak believed that Platybelodon used its spoon-shaped mandible to retain large quantities of water plants, and that it would have removed mud and other detritus using its enlarged upper lip. However, wear patterns on the teeth suggest that it used its lower tusks to strip bark from trees, and may have used the sharp front edge of the lower tusks that formed the edge of the "shovel" more like a scythe, grasping branches with its trunk and rubbing them against the lower teeth to cut it from a tree. Adults in particular might have eaten coarser vegetation more frequently than juveniles. A 2023 study based on finite element analysis, suggested that Platybelodon was specifically adapted to cutting vertically growing plants, and may have extensively grazed, using its blade-like lower tusks to slice through grass and other low growing plants while it was held taut by the trunk, in addition to feeding from trees. Its adaptations may have evolved as a result of a regional drying event, and the expansion of open ecosystems. Due to the flexibility of its lifestyle, Platybelodon may have outcompeted the other longirostrine (long-snouted) proboscideans of its environment. Platybelodon became extinct in northern China at the end of the Middle Miocene, perhaps as a result of unfavorable climatic change.

=== Growth and sexual dimorphism ===
Platybelodon exhibited strong sexual dimorphism. Males had larger and more robust upper tusks, indicating a strong role in agonistic behaviours (i.e. combat between males), more posteriorly located nasal bones, suggested to indicate a more well-developed trunk, a longer mandibular symphysis, and a short temporal fossa with a higher arch. The teeth were also somewhat sexually dimorphic, with males having narrower and longer third molars (both upper and lower). Juveniles have mandibular symphyses with a length-width ratio intermediate between that of males and females. The sexual dimorphism observed in Platybelodon is overall quite similar to that observed in Gomphotherium. In 2016, Shiqi Wang and Tao Deng noted that this implies a period of intense sexual selection in proboscidean evolution, particularly in trilophodont gomphotheres. This may have originated as far back as basal proboscideans such as Phiomia. Later proboscideans, such as modern elephants, ceased to be as sexually dimorphic.

Ontogenetic growth series (from fetus to adult)
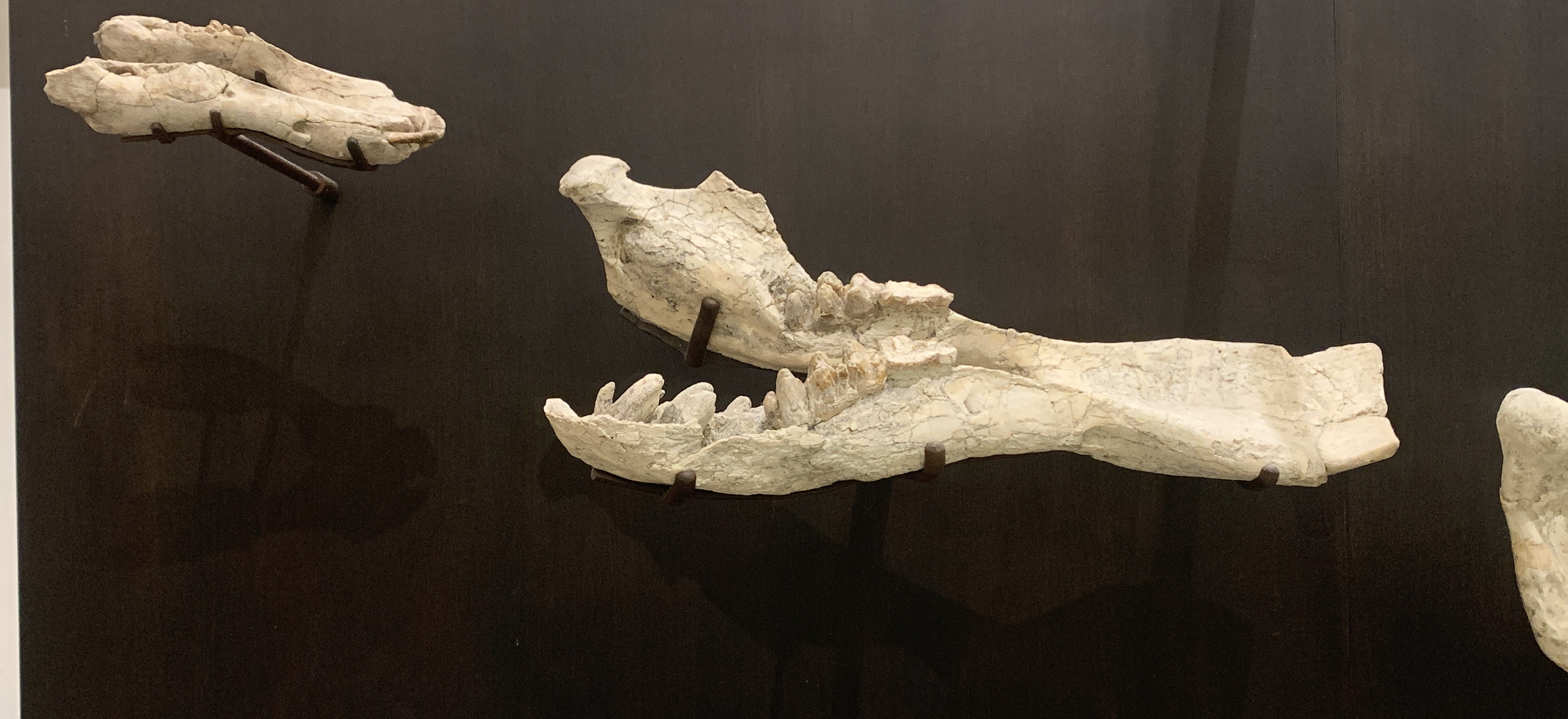
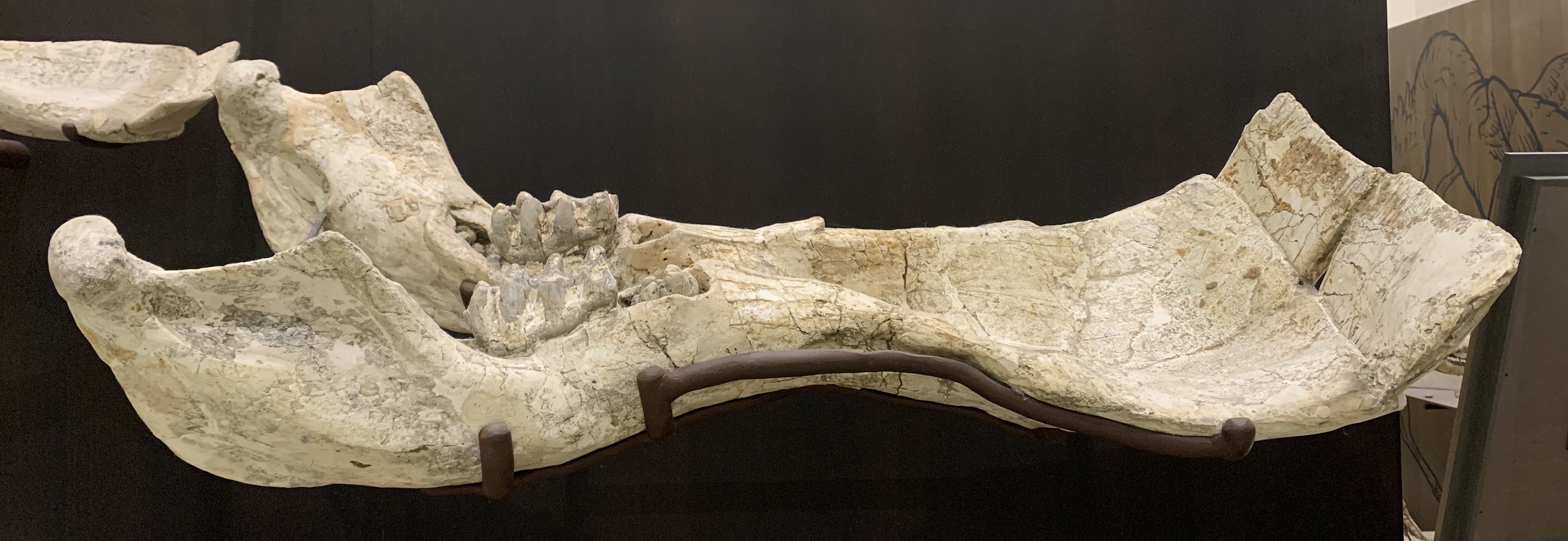
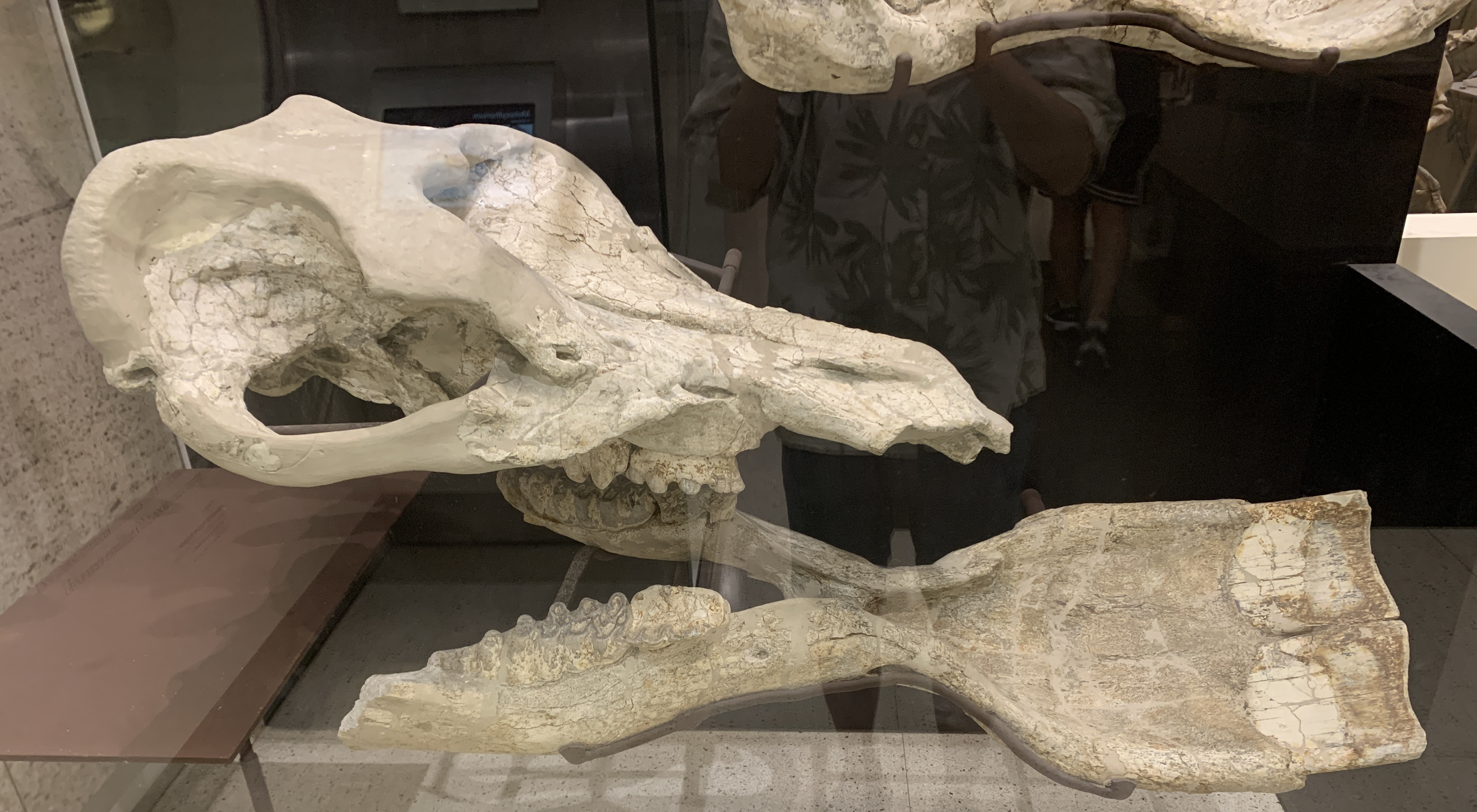
