= Eurybelodon =

Eurybelodon Temporal range: Clarendonian 13.6–10.3 Ma

Scientific classification
- Kingdom: Animalia
- Phylum: Chordata
- Class: Mammalia
- Order: Proboscidea
- Family: †Amebelodontidae
- Genus: †Eurybelodon; Lambert, 2016

Type species
- †Eurybelodon shoshanii Lambert, 2016

Extinct genus of mammals

Eurybelodon is an extinct genus of proboscidean in the family Amebelodontidae. It lived in the Clarendonian age of the Miocene.

== Etymology ==
The genus name comes from the Greek eury, which means broad, and belodon, meaning front tooth. The specific name of the type species is dedicated to Jeheskel Shoshani, who made significant contributions to proboscidean research.

== Taxonomy ==
The type specimen, a partial upper tusk, was described from Black Butte in western Oregon in 1963. It was originally assigned to the genus Platybelodon, but was reclassified as a distinct genus after a 2016 analysis revealed key morphological differences between it and other amebelodontids. Though it was originally classified in the family Gomphotheriidae with Platybelodon and Amebelodon, it was moved when the subfamily Amebelodontinae was elevated to a distinct family.
