= Neades =

Greek creatures of myth based on fossils

The Neades (Ancient Greek: Νηάς, Νηάδες) were legendary creatures of gigantic size said to inhabit the Greek island of Samos. Their voices were said to be capable of causing earthquakes, and ancient sources report that their bones were put on display by the island's inhabitants.

== Ancient accounts ==
The Neades were described by Euphorion in his lost text Commentaries, written in the 3rd century B.C.E. Aelian, writing in the 2nd century C.E., recounts Euphorion's description of them in his own work titled On the Nature of Animals (De Natura Animalium 17.28).

Euphorion says in the Commentaries that Samos was desolate in ancient times, for gigantic beasts appeared upon it, indeed vast and savage and terrible to approach, and they were called Neades. In fact, they rent the earth with their shouts alone. Because of this, there is a maxim said to flow throughout Samos: "They shout louder than the Neades!" And yet the same source says that their vast bones are displayed even now.

Plutarch does not write about the Neades specifically, but he does relate another legend of ancient Samos in which earthquakes are caused by the island's ancient inhabitants, whose bones were likewise viewed by his contemporaries (Greek Questions 56).

Why is the place in the island of Samos called Panaima? It is because, fleeing Dionysus, the Amazons sailed from the country of the Ephesians to Samos: but when he made boats and went over, he joined battle and killed many of them around this place which, because of the great quantity of flowing blood, the marveling spectators called Panaima. And of the slain, some are said to have perished about Phloion and their bones are pointed out there. But some say even Phloion was rent by them when they uttered a great and piercing cry.

== Possible influence by fossil taxa ==
Adrienne Mayor and Nikos Solounias have speculated that the Neades of Aelian's description may have been influenced by the fossilized remains of extinct proboscideans. This speculation is based on the fact that the fossils on Samos are found near a major fault zone, suggesting that ancient Greeks may have interpreted the presence of their skeletal remains as being associated with past seismic activity in the region. Several species of elephant-like animals are represented in the Miocene-age geological deposits on Samos, namely Deinotherium proavum, Choerolophodon pentelici, and Konobelodon atticus.

=== Amazons and equid fossils ===
They suggest also that Panaima as referred to in Plutarch's account, translated as "bloodbath", is a genuine geographic location on the island. They point to a particular bone bed near red sedimentary deposits, suggesting that it was the color of those sediments that inspired the name Panaima. It has also been suggested that the involvement of the Amazons, who were themselves legendary horse-riding warriors, in Plutarch's account of these fossiliferous sites was influenced by the discovery of equid fossils near the same localities, namely those of Hippotherium and Hipparion.

=== Temple of Hera ===
Mayor and Solounias argue that ancient residents of Samos were aware of both the island's fossil record and its geology, and that the stories recounted by Aelian and Plutarch were attempts to make sense of the two. They also cite the discovery of a fossil femur at the Temple of Hera on Samos, suggesting that the bones of the "Neades" were in fact put on display in Antiquity, as attested by Aelian.
