= Torynobelodon =

Torynobelodon Temporal range: Miocene, 15–10 Ma

Scientific classification
- Kingdom: Animalia
- Phylum: Chordata
- Class: Mammalia
- Infraclass: Placentalia
- Order: Proboscidea
- Family: †Amebelodontidae
- Subfamily: †Platybelodontinae
- Genus: †Torynobelodon; Barbour, 1929

Type species
- †Torynobelodon loomisi Barbour, 1929

Species
- T. loomisi Barbour, 1929; T. campester? Cope, 1877

Extinct genus of large herbivorous mammal

Torynobelodon is a genus of large herbivorous amebelodontid proboscideans, related to the elephants. It lived during the late Miocene Epoch in Asia and North America.

== Taxonomy ==
Shoshani (1996) placed Torynobelodon as a synonym of Platybelodon, but Lambert and Shoshani (1998) considered it morphologically distinct to be a separate genus. A 2016 cladistic study found it to be more primitive than either Platybelodon and Aphanobelodon.

== See also ==
- Gnathabelodon
- Eubelodon
- Serbelodon
- Amebelodon
- Konobelodon
- Platybelodon
