= Progomphotherium =

Progomphotherium Temporal range: 23–11.6 Ma

Scientific classification
- Kingdom: Animalia
- Phylum: Chordata
- Class: Mammalia
- Order: Proboscidea
- Family: †Amebelodontidae
- Genus: †Progomphotherium; Pickford, 2003
- Species: †P. maraisi

Binomial name
- †Progomphotherium maraisi Pickford, 2003

Extinct family of mammals

Progomphotherium is an extinct genus of large herbivorous mammals closely related to elephants. Remains of Progomphotherium are known from Africa. It was considered as a member of Amebelodontinae but was excluded from this group in 2016 due to incomplete nature of known material.
