= Paratetralophodon =

Paratetralophodon Temporal range: Late Miocene–Pliocene

Scientific classification
- Kingdom: Animalia
- Phylum: Chordata
- Class: Mammalia
- Order: Proboscidea
- Superfamily: Elephantoidea
- Genus: †Paratetralophodon; Tassy, 1983

Species
- P. hasnotensis (Osborn, 1929) (type); ?P. exoletus (Hopwood, 1935)

Extinct genus of mammals

Paratetralophodon (from Ancient Greek παρα- (para-), meaning "beside", and Tetralophodon) is an extinct genus of proboscidean from late Neogene deposits in India and China. Although traditionally classified in the family Gomphotheriidae, recent studies find it to be more closely related to modern elephants.

Paratetralophodon hasnotensis, found in the Siwalik Hills of northern India, is the only unequivocal species in the genus, but the Far Eastern form "Tetralophodon" exoletus is tentatively considered referable to this genus based on similarities with P. hasnotensis, while specimens from Lantian, China, appear to represent an unnamed species of Paratetralophodon.
