= Stenobelodon =

Stenobelodon Temporal range: Miocene, 10 Ma

Scientific classification
- Kingdom: Animalia
- Phylum: Chordata
- Class: Mammalia
- Order: Proboscidea
- Family: †Amebelodontidae
- Genus: †Stenobelodon; Lambert, 2023

Species
- S. floridanus (Leidy, 1868)

Synonyms
- Amebelodon floridanus

Extinct mammal genus

Stenobelodon is an extinct genus of amebelodont proboscidean from the Miocene of North America. The only known species, Stenobelodon floridanus, was formerly considered to belong to the genus Amebelodon but was distinguished in 2023 based on the short and only partially flattened lower tusks and the closer resemblance of its cheek teeth to those of Gomphotherium than to its purported close relatives. Fossils are known from Florida and Kansas. Jukar et al. (2025) contested the validity of this name as the purported 'type specimen' was not the lectotype of this species, thus making Lambert's S. floridanus an unintentional novel species. They concluded that, regardless of the nomenclature or specimens used, S. floridanus should be regarded as a nomen dubium. Lambert reiterated the validity and distinction of S. floridanus later that year based on a newly-assigned holotype more closely aligning with historic treatments of the referrable fossil material. Lambert et al. (2026) described fossils from Maryland that they regarded as aff. Stenobelodon floridanus.
