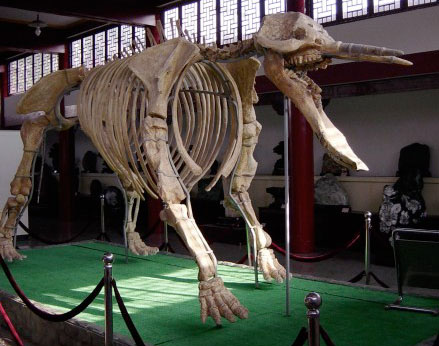
- Platybelodon skeleton in a Hubei, China, museum

Scientific classification
- Kingdom: Animalia
- Phylum: Chordata
- Class: Mammalia
- Infraclass: Placentalia
- Order: Proboscidea
- Clade: Elephantida
- Family: †Amebelodontidae; Barbour, 1927

Genera
- †Archaeobelodon Tassy, 1984; †Eurybelodon Lambert, 2016; †?Konobelodon Lambert, 1990; †Progomphotherium? Pickford, 2003; †Serbelodon Frick, 1933; †Saegusaia Wang et al., 2025; †Stenobelodon Lambert, 2023; †Amebelodontinae; †Afromastodon Pickford, 2003; †Amebelodon Barbour, 1927; †Eubelodon Barbour, 1914; †Megabelodon Barbour, 1914; †Protanancus Arambourg, 1945; †Torynobelodon Barbour, 1929; †Platybelodontinae; †Aphanobelodon Wang et al., 2016; †Platybelodon Borissiak, 1928

= Amebelodontidae =

Amebelodontidae Temporal range: Early Miocene–Late Miocene

Extinct family of mammals

Amebelodontidae is an extinct family of large herbivorous proboscidean mammals related to elephants. They were formerly assigned to Gomphotheriidae, but recent authors consider them a distinct family. They are distinguished from other proboscideans by having flattened lower tusks (leading to the nickname "shovel tuskers") and very elongate mandibular symphysis (the fused frontmost part of the lower jaw). The lower tusks could grow to considerable size, with those of Konobelodon reaching 1.61 metres (5.3 ft) in length. Their molar teeth are typically trilophodont (with only Konobelodon being fully tetralophodont), and possessed posttrite conules. In the past, amebelodonts' shovel-like mandibular tusks led to them being portrayed scooping up water plants, however, dental microwear suggests that they were browsers and mixed feeders. The lower tusks have been proposed to have had a variety of functions depending on the species, including stripping bark, cutting through vegetation, as well as possibly digging. They first appeared in Africa during the Early Miocene, and subsequently dispersed into Eurasia and then North America. They became extinct by the beginning of the Pliocene. While some phylogenetic studies have recovered Amebelodontidae as a monophyletic group that forms the sister group to Gomphotheriidae proper, some authors have argued that Amebelodontidae may be polyphyletic, with it being suggested that the shovel-tusked condition arose several times independently within Gomphotheriidae, thus rendering the family invalid.

Phylogeny of Amebelodontidae after Li et al. 2023.

- Elephantida (gomphotheres sensu lato)
  - Choerolophodontidae
  - - "Gomphotheriidae" (paraphyletic, ancestral to Elephantidae)
    - Amebelodontidae
      - - Archaeobelodon filholi
        - Serbelodon barbourensis
      - - Protanancus brevirostris
        - - Protanancus wimani
          - - Eubelodon morrilli
            - Megabelodon lulii
        - - Protanancus macinnnesi
          - - Protanancus chinjiensis
            - - Amebelodon fricki
              - Torynobelodon britti
        - - Platybelodon barnumbrowni
          - - Platybelodon danovi
            - - Platybelodon grangeri
              - Aphanobelodon zhaoi

Cladogram after Wang et al. 2025:

- Amebelodontidae
  - Serbelodon barbourensis
  - - Archaeobelodon
    - - Saegusaia brevirostris
      - - Saegusaia wimani
        - - Amebelodontinae
            - Afromastodon
            - - Megabelodon lulli
              - Eubelodon morrilli
            - - Protanancus macinnesi
              - Protanancus chinjiensis
              - - Amebelodon floridanus
                - Amebelodon fricki
                - Torynobelodon campester'
          - Platybelodontinae
            - "Platybelodon" barnumbrowni
            - - Aphanobelodon zhaoi
              - - Platybelodon danovi
                - Platybelodon tongxinensis
                - Platybelodon dangheenensis
                - - Platybelodon grangeri
                  - Platybelodon tetralophus

== Gallery ==
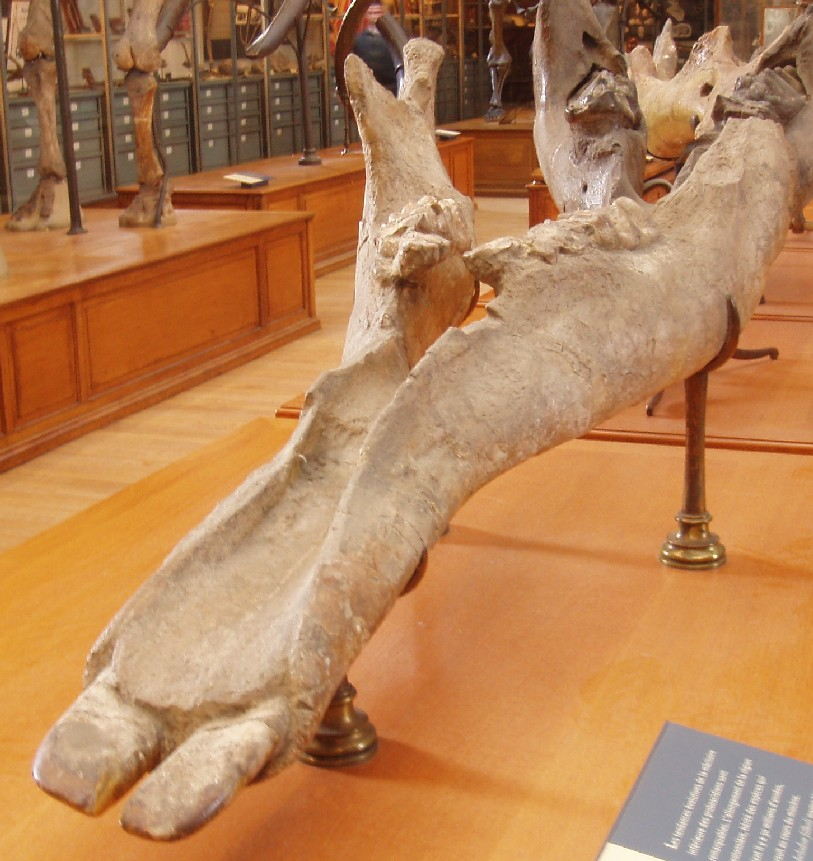
Archaeobelodon filholi mandible

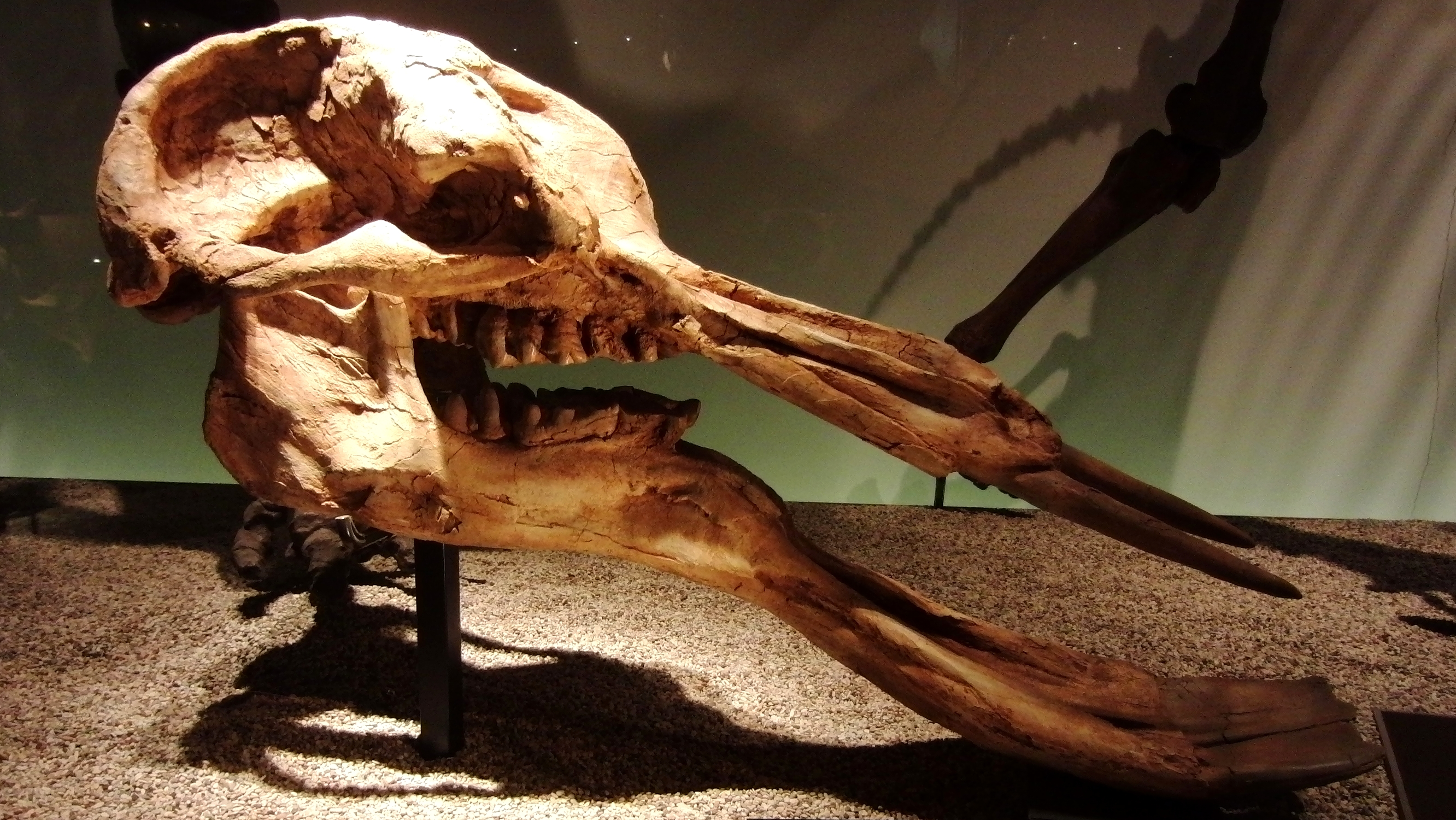
Skull of Platybelodon grangeri
