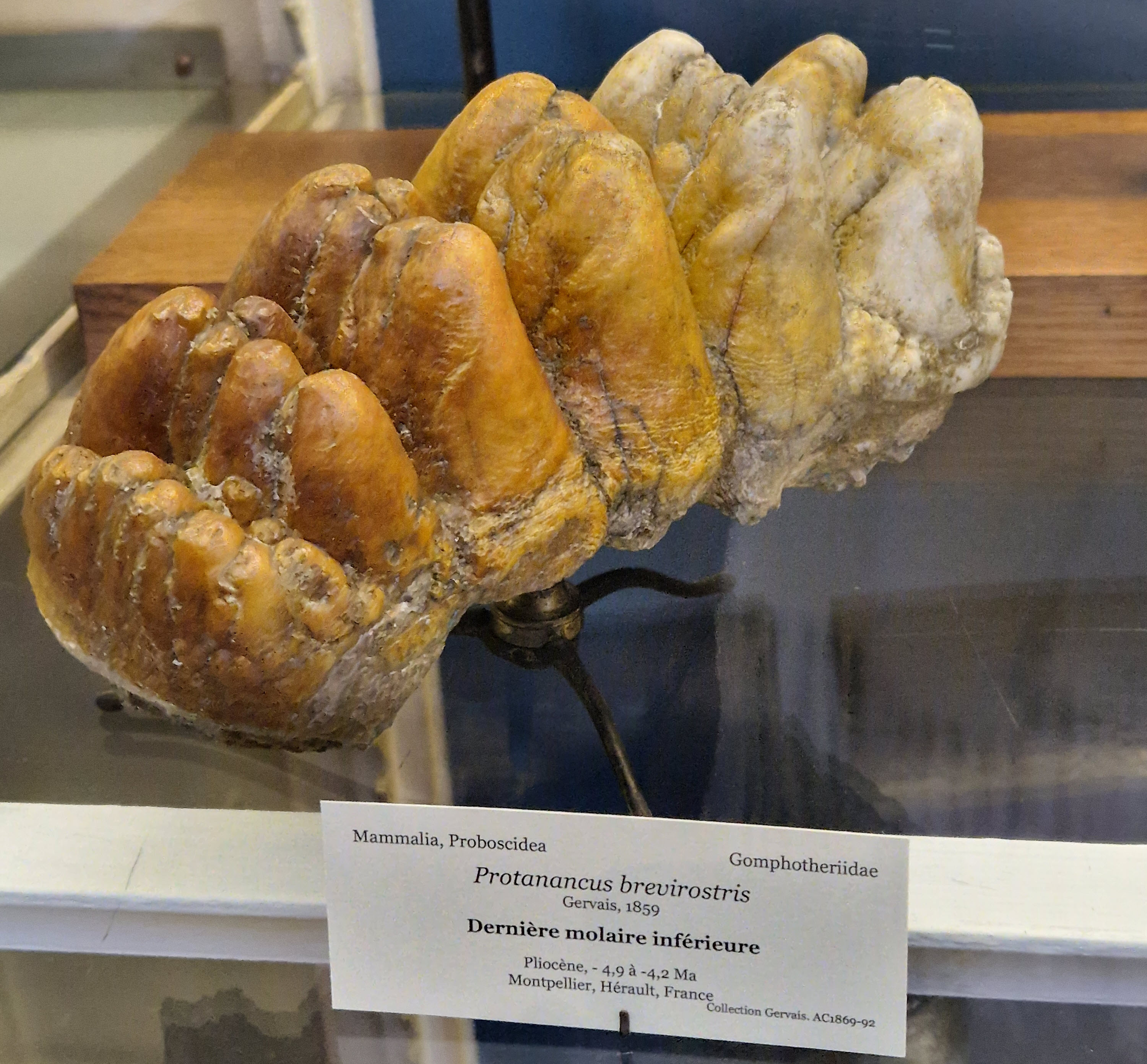
- Protanancus brevirostris (Gervais, 1859)

Scientific classification
- Kingdom: Animalia
- Phylum: Chordata
- Class: Mammalia
- Infraclass: Placentalia
- Order: Proboscidea
- Family: †Amebelodontidae
- Genus: †Protanancus; Arambourg, 1945

Type species
- Protanancus macinnesi Arambourg, 1945

Other Species
- P. barnumbrowni Barbour, 1931; P. chinjiensis (Pilgrim, 1913); P. presbytatos Sanders et al., 2026

= Protanancus =

Protanancus Temporal range: Miocene

Extinct genus of mammals

Protanancus is an extinct genus of amebelodontid proboscidean native to Africa, Asia, and North America during the Miocene epoch. The generic name is derived from the unrelated Anancus, and the Greek prōtos "first".

== Description ==
Protanancus, about the size of a present-day Asian elephant, was presumably quite similar to the related proboscidean Platybelodon. Like Platybelodon, the mandibular symphysis of this species was narrow and elongated, and possessed two flattened tusks. Investigation of the structure of the lower tusks revealed that those of Protanancus were concentric, like those of most proboscideans (including present-day proboscideans), while those of Platybelodon possessed dentinal tubules.

== Classification ==
Protanancus was described by Arambourg in 1945. A few species are known, including the South Asian P. chinjiensis and the African P. macinnesi. The most recent remains are African and those from the Siwaliks area. This animal is thought to have evolved from Gomphotherium, and developed over millions of years to give rise to other similar animals such as Platybelodon or Amebelodon. Protanancus is also related to Archaeobelodon. Other fossils have been found in Bulgaria. In 2026, the taxa "Platybelodon" barnumbrowni was deduced to in fact belong to Protanancus, suggesting the taxon was present in North America as well.

== Paleobiology ==
Dental mesowear of P. macinnesi from Maboko in Kenya suggests that it was a browser that foraged in shrublands and woodlands. Fossils of Protanancus in China have been found in the same locations as those of Platybelodon. However, it appears that after living together for at least two million years, Platybelodon survived and Protanancus became extinct. Only in the area where Platybelodon was not present (the Siwalik) did Protanancus still thrive. The shape of the jaws of the two animals indicates that they had the same lifestyle, with shovel-like tusks that could pick up plant material. However, the tubular structure of Platybelodon's tusks indicates that this animal bore greater loads and more abrasion than Protanancus.
