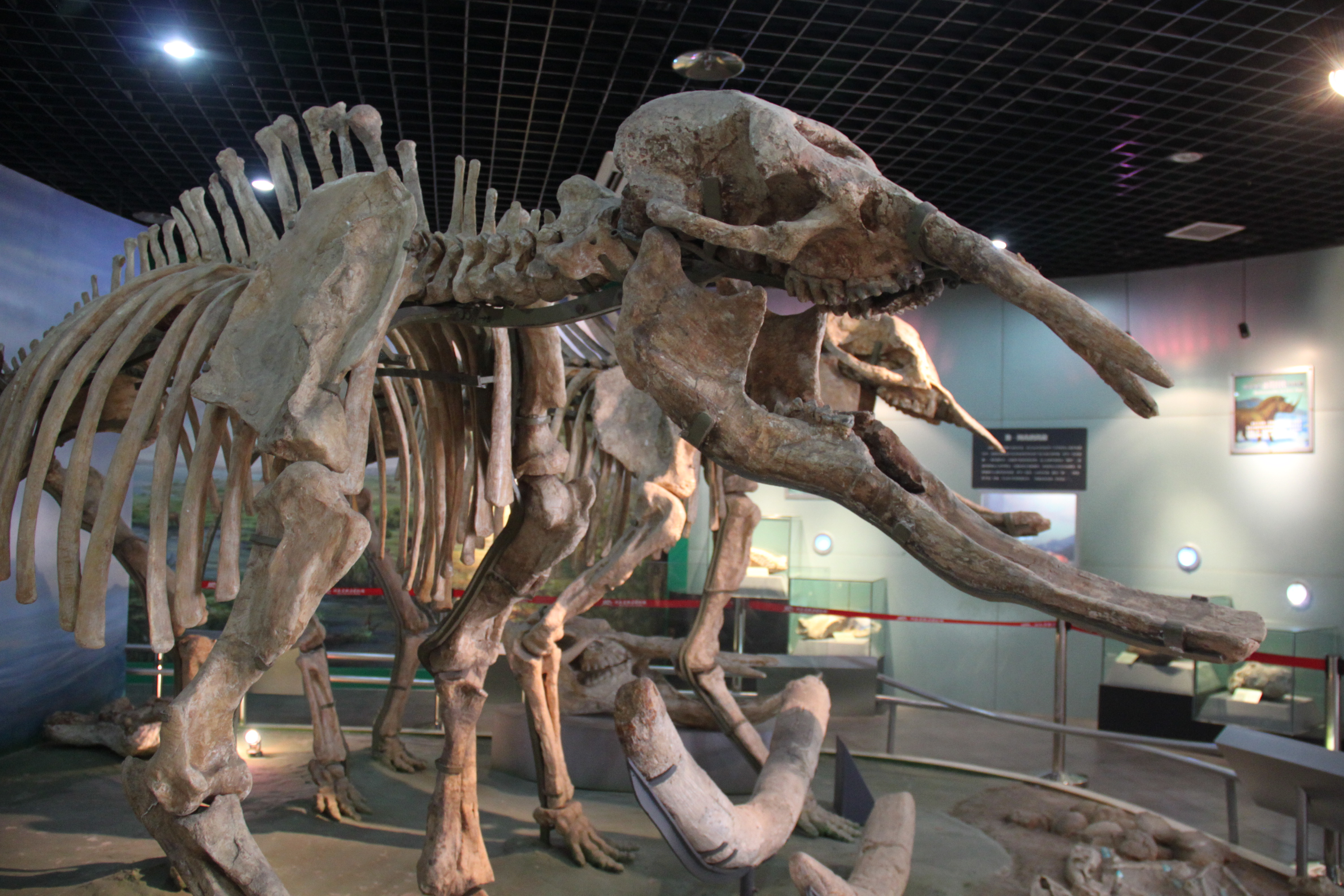
- Mounted skeleton, Henan Geological Museum

Scientific classification
- Kingdom: Animalia
- Phylum: Chordata
- Class: Mammalia
- Order: Proboscidea
- Superfamily: Elephantoidea
- Genus: †Tetralophodon; Falconer, 1857

Species
- †T. longirostris (Kaup, 1832) (type); †T. curvirostris (Bergounioux and Crouzel, 1960); †T. gigantorostris (Klähn, 1931); †T. punjabiensis (Lydekker, 1886); †T. xiaolongtanensis (Chow and Chang, 1974); †T. euryrostris (Wang, Saegusa, Duangkrayom, He, and Chen, 2017)

= Tetralophodon =

Tetralophodon Temporal range: Middle Miocene–Late Miocene

Extinct genus of mammals

Tetralophodon (from Ancient Greek τετρα- (tetra-), meaning "four", λόφος (lóphos), meaning "ridge", and ὀδούς (odoús), meaning "tooth") is an extinct genus of "tetralophodont gomphothere" belonging to the superfamily Elephantoidea, known from the Miocene of Afro-Eurasia. It has been proposed as a possible ancestor of Elephantidae.

== Taxonomy and evolution ==
The type species of Tetralophodon, T. longirostris, was originally named Mastodon longirostris by Johann Jakob Kaup in 1832, based on remains including a partial mandible (lower jaw) with teeth collected from the vicinity of Eppelsheim in Germany. The genus Tetralophodon was later named in 1857 by Hugh Falconer.

Tetralophodon is suggested to have descended from the "trilophodont gomphothere" Gomphotherium, probably from a lineage belonging or closely related to the species G. steinheimense. African species of Tetralophodon have been suggested as ancestral to the family Elephantidae, which includes modern elephants, with Tetralophodon likely a direct ancestor of the primitive elephantid Stegotetrabelodon. Tetralophodon has also been suggested as ancestral to the fellow "tetralophodont gomphothere" Anancus.

== Description ==
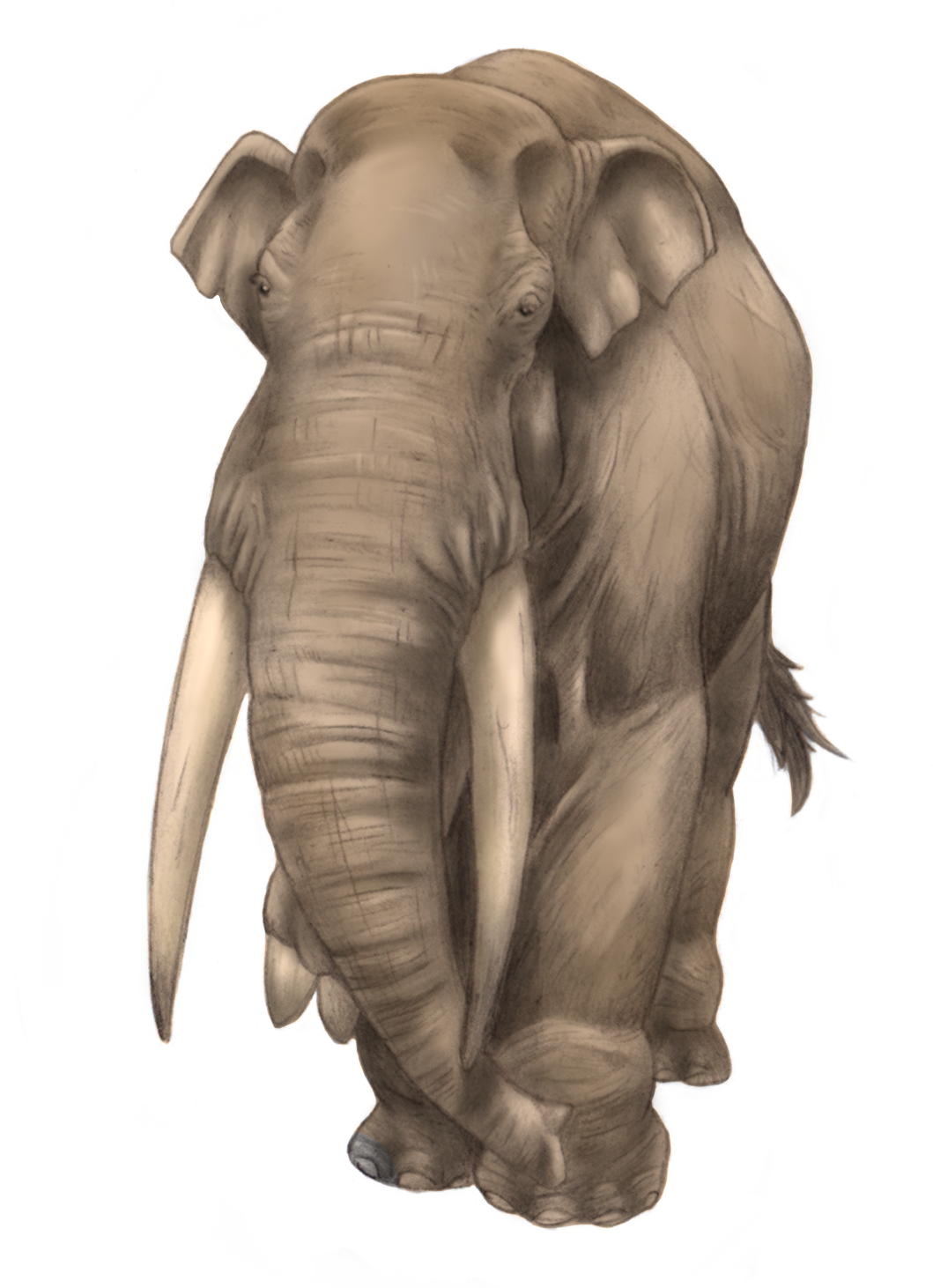
Restoration

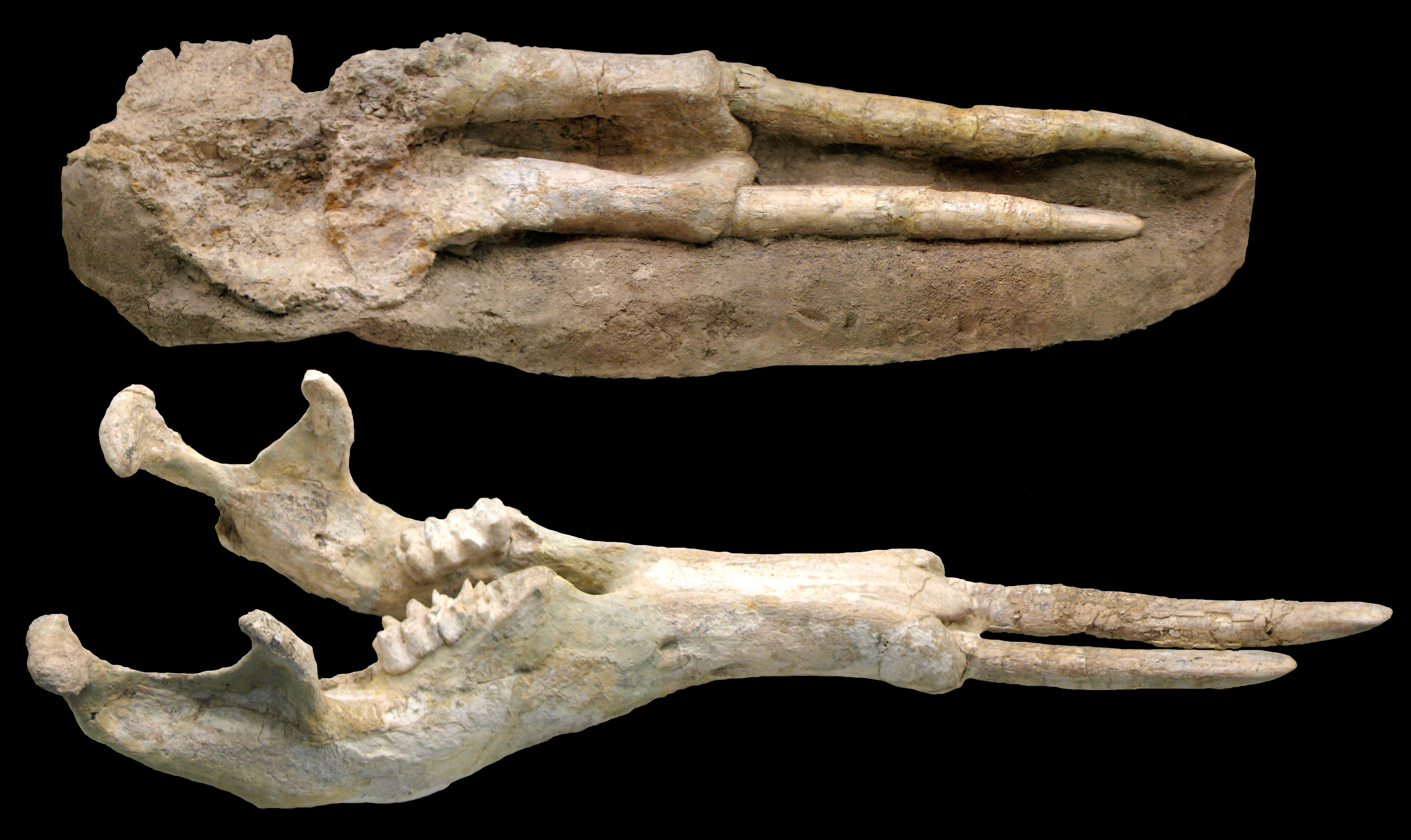
Lower jaw (below) of Tetralophodon longirostris, showing the elongate mandibular symphysis and large lower tusks

A large individual of the European species T. longirostris is estimated to have stood 3.45 metres (11.3 ft) tall at the shoulder and weighed up to 10 tonnes. The first and second molar teeth are tetralophodont, bearing four pairs of cusps. The mandibular symphysis (the fused frontmost part of the lower jaw) is typically elongate and bears lower tusks. The lower tusks vary greatly in size and morphology between species, with some species having flattened tusks with an oval-shaped cross section, while others have tusks that are pyriform (pear-shaped) in cross section. The upper tusks are proportionally large and lack enamel bands.

== Distribution ==
Tetralophodon was widespread across the Old World. Fossils have been found in Middle to Late Miocene deposits of Europe, Asia, and Africa. The likely oldest species in the genus, the European T. longirostris, first appeared around 13–12.5 million years ago and may have survived in Europe until about 7 million years ago. The North American species T. campester and T. fricki were moved to the genus Pediolophodon in 2007, which has been suggested to be unrelated to Tetralophodon and instead represent an example of parallel evolution.

== Ecology ==
Specimens of Tetralophodon from the late Miocene of East Africa have been suggested to have been browsers and mixed feeders based on mesowear analysis. Analysis of tooth wear suggests that these individuals had developed proal movement (back-to-front motion) in the lower jaw, similar to that used by modern elephants but different from that of earlier gomphotheres. A similar mixed-feeding diet with a strong browsing component was inferred for T. longirostris individuals from the Hammerschmiede clay pit in Germany, dating to approximately 11.4–11.6 million years ago.
