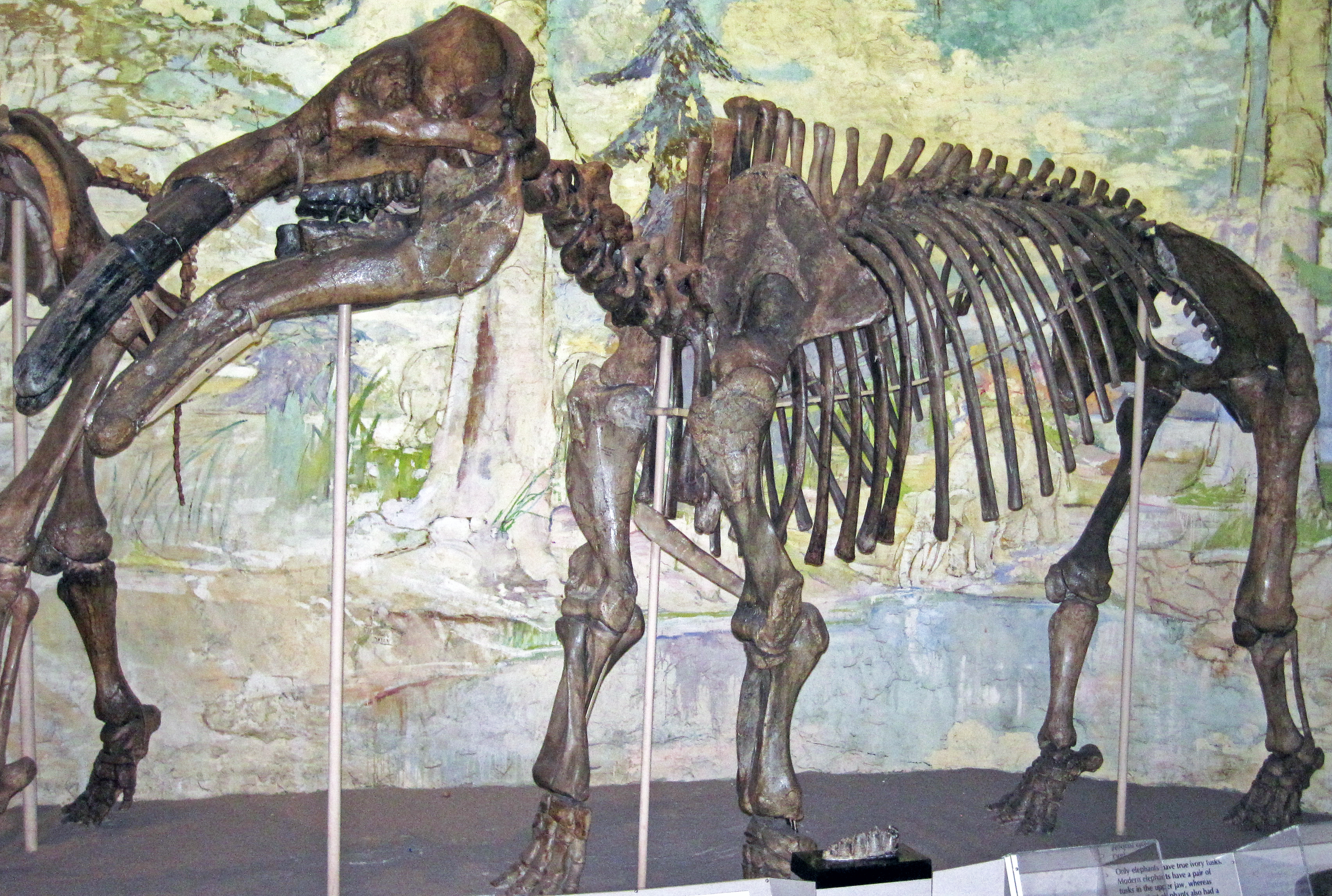
- M. lulli skeleton

Scientific classification
- Domain: Eukaryota
- Kingdom: Animalia
- Phylum: Chordata
- Class: Mammalia
- Order: Proboscidea
- Family: †Gomphotheriidae
- Genus: †Megabelodon; Barbour, 1914

Type species
- †Megabelodon lulli Barbour, 1914

Species
- M. cruziensis Frick 1933; M. joraki Frick, 1933; M. lulli; M. minor Barbour 1934; M. phippsi Cook 1928

= Megabelodon =

Megabelodon Temporal range: Miocene–Pliocene

Extinct genus of proboscid

Megabelodon is an extinct genus of proboscidean which inhabited North America in from the Miocene to the Pliocene. Specimens were found in Nevada and New Mexico. The genus has been disputed, with some paleontologists considering Megabelodon as a synonym of Gomphotherium, while others have considered it to be a genus of amebelodontid.
