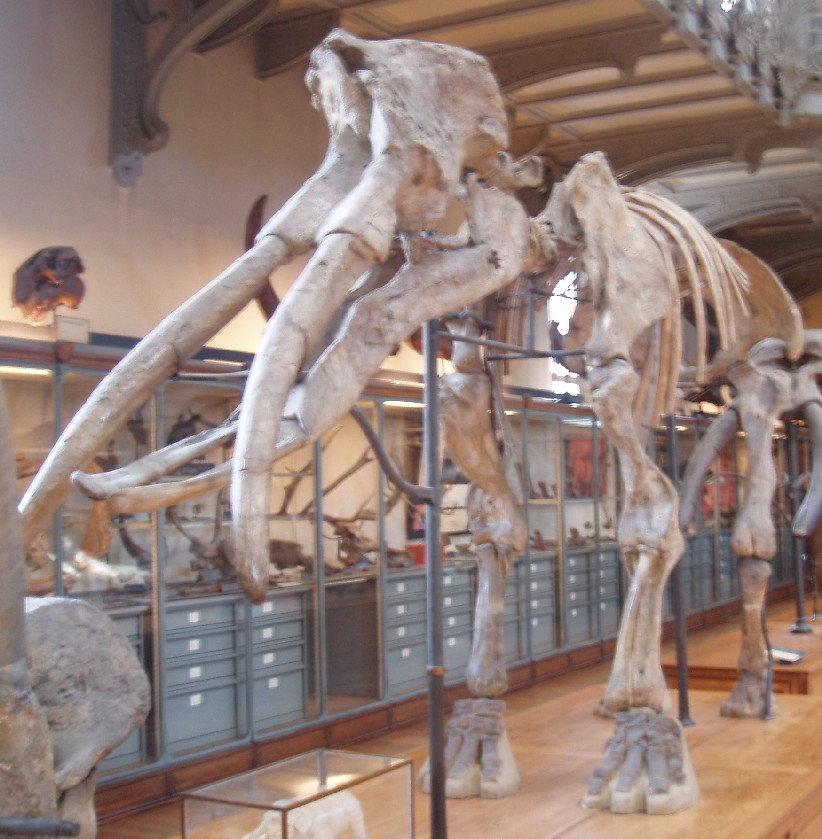
- Skeleton of A. filholi at the National Museum of Natural History, Paris

Scientific classification
- Kingdom: Animalia
- Phylum: Chordata
- Class: Mammalia
- Order: Proboscidea
- Family: †Amebelodontidae
- Genus: †Archaeobelodon; Tassy, 1984

Type species
- †Archaeobelodon filholi Frick, 1933

Other Species
- †A. tassyi Sanders and colleagues, 2026

Synonyms
- A. filholi; Serridentinus filholi Frick, 1933; A. tassyi; Platybelodon kisumuensis Harris and Watkins, 1974 (Partim); Gomphotherium angustidens kisumuensis Savage and Willamson, 1978; Platybelodon sp. Pickford, 1981; Archaeobelodon aff. filholi Tassy, 1984; Gomphotherium cf. angustidens Leakey an Walker, 1985

= Archaeobelodon =

Archaeobelodon Temporal range: Early-Middle Miocene (MN4b-8) ~18–17 Ma

Extinct genus of mammals

Archaeobelodon is an extinct genus of proboscidean of the family Amebelodontidae that lived in Europe and North Africa (Egypt) during the Miocene from 18 to 17 million years ago.

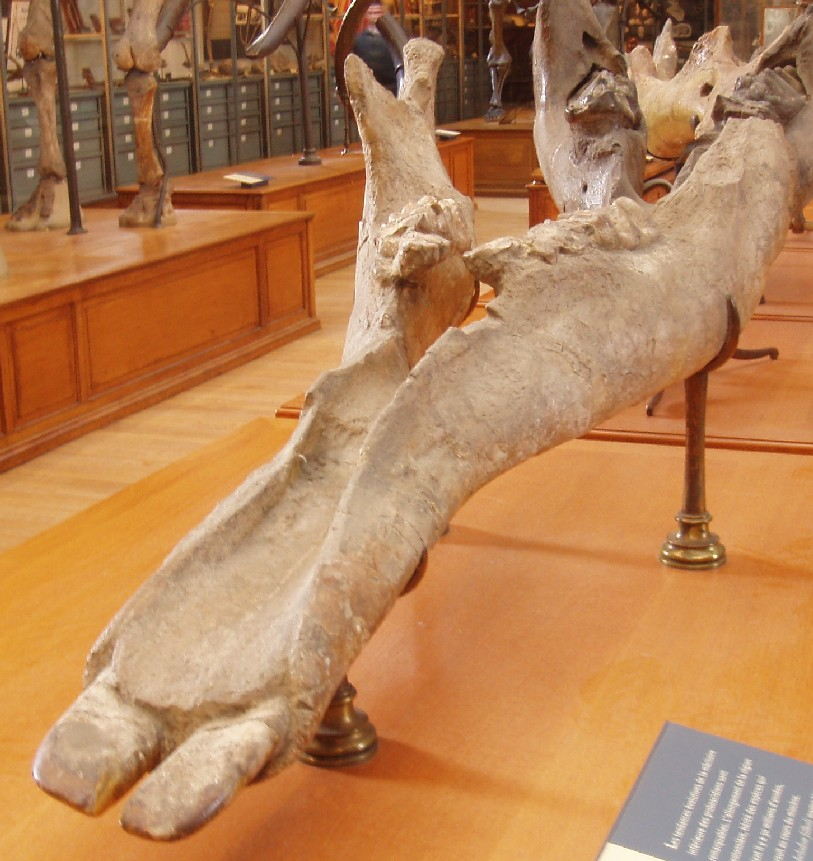
Mandible

Archaeobelodon was an ancestor of Platybelodon and Amebelodon. Archaeobelodon had a trunk and tusks. It reached a weight of about 2.305–3.477 tonnes (2,305–3,477 kg), being smaller than a modern elephant.
