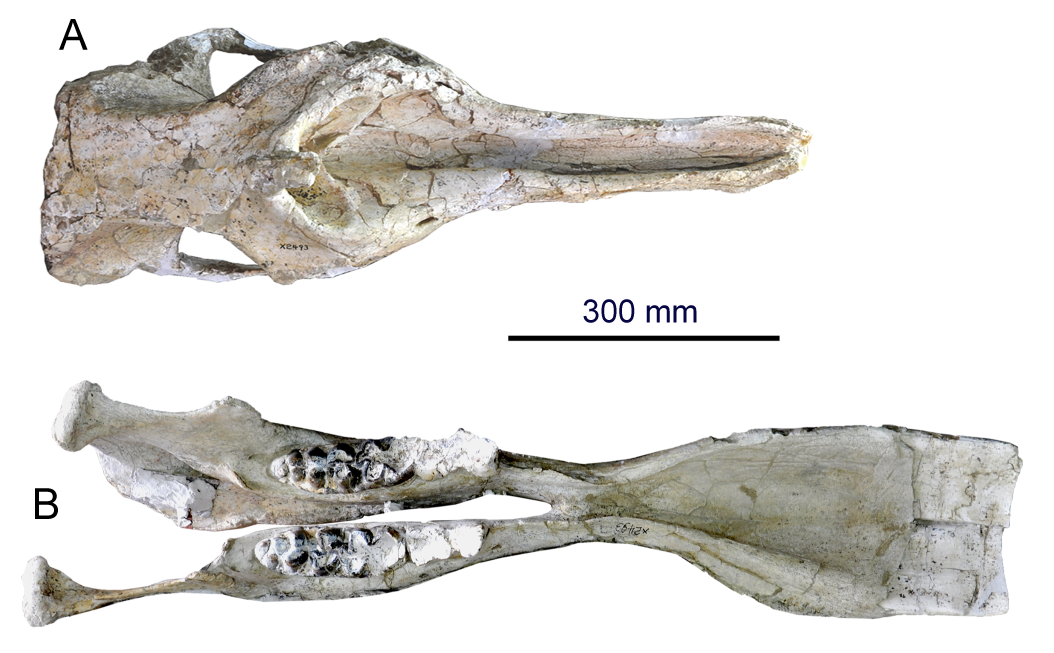
- Holotype cranium (A) and mandible (B) seen from above

Scientific classification
- Kingdom: Animalia
- Phylum: Chordata
- Class: Mammalia
- Infraclass: Placentalia
- Order: Proboscidea
- Family: †Amebelodontidae
- Genus: †Aphanobelodon; Wang et al., 2016

Type species
- †Aphanobelodon zhaoi Wang et al., 2016

= Aphanobelodon =

Aphanobelodon Temporal range: Middle Miocene

Extinct genus of mammals

Aphanobelodon is an extinct genus of proboscidean in the family Amebelodontidae, it lived in northern China during the Middle Miocene.

== Taxonomy ==
The holotype is the complete cranium of an adult female, and the paratypes include the remains of another adult female, an adult male, four subadults, and three calves. It is one of the few proboscidean species that lacks upper tusks, a trait previously thought to be unique to deinotheres.

The generic name comes from aphano, meaning invisible, and belodon, meaning front tooth. The specific name of the type species is after Rong Zhao, who discovered and excavated the specimens.
