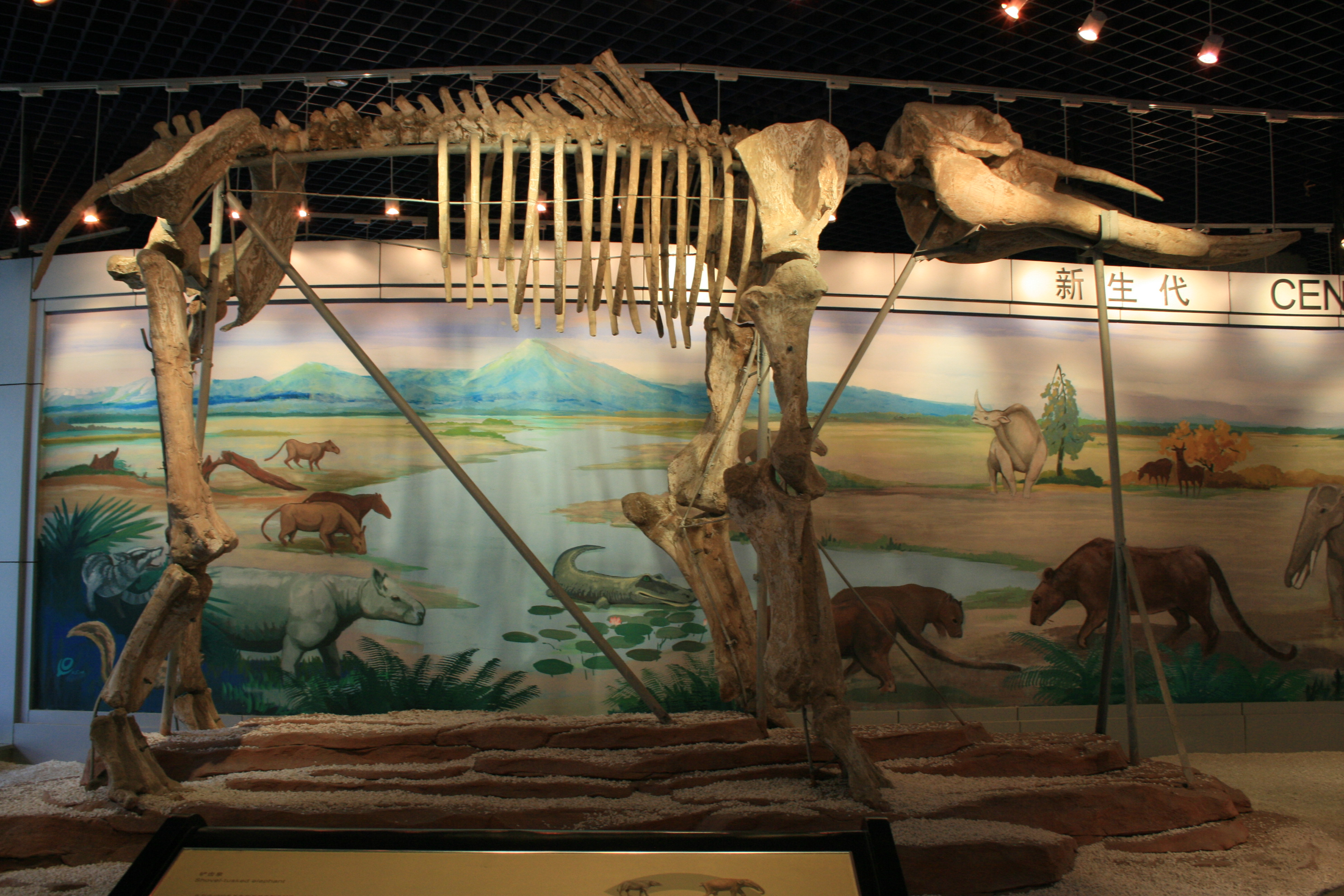
- Serbelodon sp. skeleton in Nanjing Paleontology Museum

Scientific classification
- Kingdom: Animalia
- Phylum: Chordata
- Class: Mammalia
- Order: Proboscidea
- Family: †Amebelodontidae
- Genus: †Serbelodon; Frick, 1933

Type species
- †Serbelodon barbourensis Frick, 1933

Species
- †S. barbourensis Frick, 1933 †S. burnhami Osborn, 1933

= Serbelodon =

Serbelodon Temporal range: Middle Miocene

Extinct genus of mammals

Serbelodon is an extinct genus of proboscidean. It had tusks and a trunk. It lived in North America during the Miocene Epoch, and it was closely related to Amebelodon. They had a diet that consisted of C3 plants which include fruits, tree cortex, herbs, and leaves.

Serbelodon burnhami was named after Frederick Russell Burnham the brother-in-law of the fossil's discoverer John C. Blick.
