= Amebelodon =

Amebelodon Temporal range: Middle Miocene–Late Miocene
- Mandible of A. fricki, being exhibited at the Royal BC Museum.

Scientific classification
- Kingdom: Animalia
- Phylum: Chordata
- Class: Mammalia
- Order: Proboscidea
- Family: †Amebelodontidae
- Genus: †Amebelodon; Barbour, 1927

Species
- A. fricki Barbour, 1927 (type)

Extinct genus of mammals

Amebelodon is a genus of extinct proboscidean belonging to Amebelodontidae (the so-called shovel-tuskers). The most striking attribute of this animal is its lower tusks, which are narrow, elongated, and distinctly flattened with the degree of flattening varying among the different species. One valid species is known for this genus, which was endemic to North America. Other species once assigned to Amebelodon are now assigned to the genus Stenobelodon and Konobelodon, the later of which was once a subgenus.

== Taxonomy ==
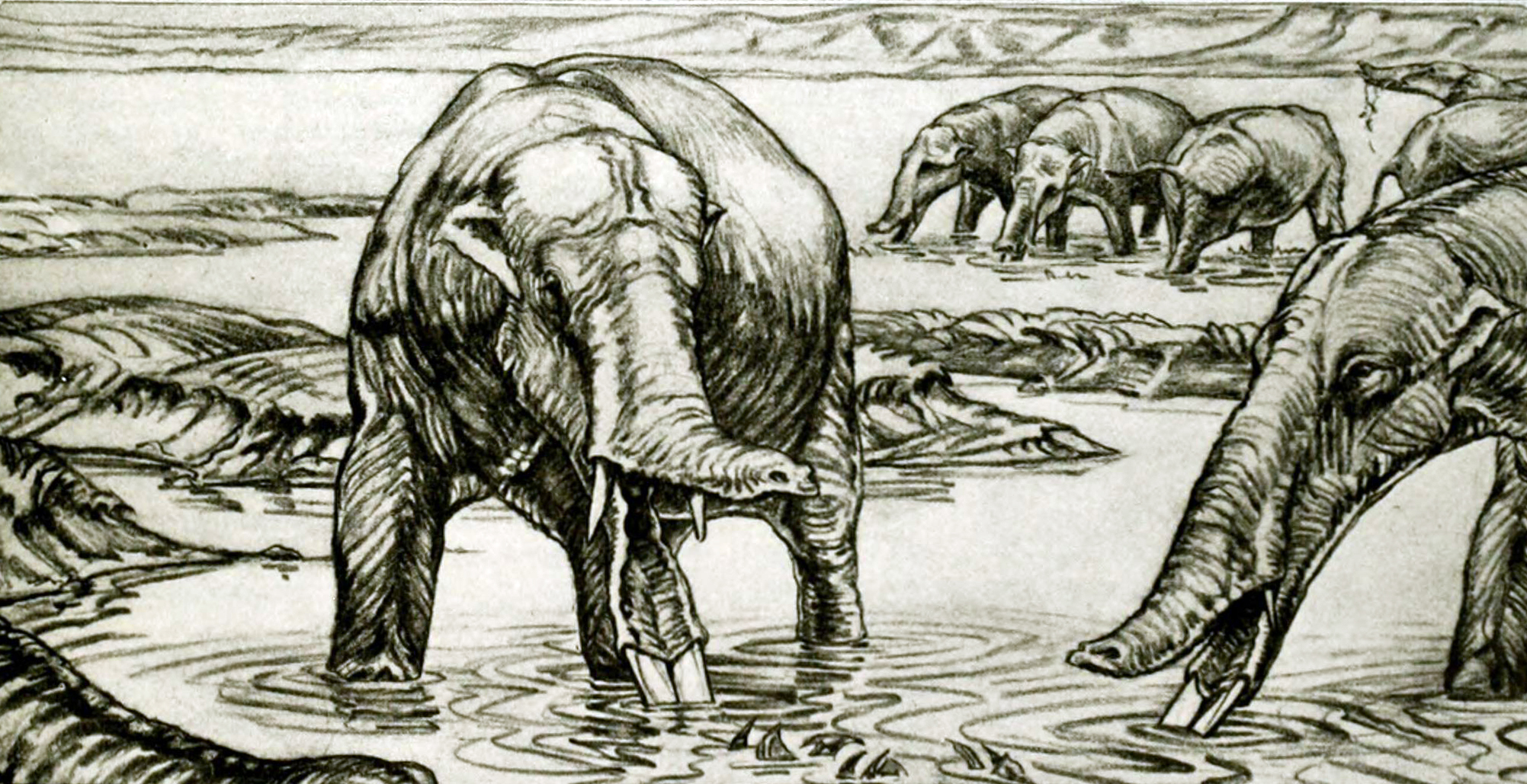
1932 A. fricki restoration showing a possibly inaccurate short trunk

Amebelodon first appeared in the Great Plains and Gulf Coast regions of North America during the late Miocene, roughly 9 million years ago, and apparently became extinct on this continent sometime around 6 million years ago. The youngest record of Amebelodon is from a 5-million-year-old site in North America. The species Amebelodon floridanus was relatively small, a little smaller than living elephants, and was common in fossil sites from 9 to 8 million years ago. Other larger but somewhat younger common North American species include Amebelodon fricki. One lineage of species once assigned to Amebelodon, including Amebelodon britti and North African Amebelodon cyrenaicus, is now placed in a separate genus called Konobelodon, formerly considered to be a subgenus.

== Description ==
A. floridanus fossils are characterised by a more primitive dental morphology as compared to A. fricki. A. floridanus also possesses distinctive mandibular tusks that further distinguish it from A. fricki.

== Paleobiology ==
Life restoration

Like other typical gomphotheres, Amebelodon possessed two sets of tusks, one upper set, (much like those found on modern elephants), and one lower set that extended from the very front of the lower jaws. However, as mentioned above, the lower tusks of the Amebelodon were distinctive in that they were relatively long, slender, and flattened. Because of the resemblance of these lower tusks to shovels, Amebelodon is commonly referred to as a "shovel-tusked" gomphothere (another shovel-tusked gomphothere that may or may not be closely related to Amebelodon is Platybelodon). There has long been an assumption that these lower tusks were actually used as shovels by the animal during feeding, presumably to dig up water plants. However, an analysis of wear patterns has shown that these lower tusks were most likely used in a variety of ways in addition to shoveling, including scraping bark from trees. Overall, the evidence indicates that this animal was a versatile browser (an animal that eats broad-leaved plants rather than grass), feeding in both wet and dry settings in a variety of ways. For reasons that are not clearly explained in the literature, Amebelodon is usually portrayed with a short, flap-like trunk (this is true of the associated picture). However, considerable evidence indicates that Amebelodon actually had a long, flexible trunk very much like that found in modern elephants, and that it probably was important for feeding, drinking, etc.

== Range ==
Amebelodon was once thought to be widespread, but a study of Konobelodon in 2012 shortened the genus' range span, with the specimens found in China moved to the genus Protanancus.
