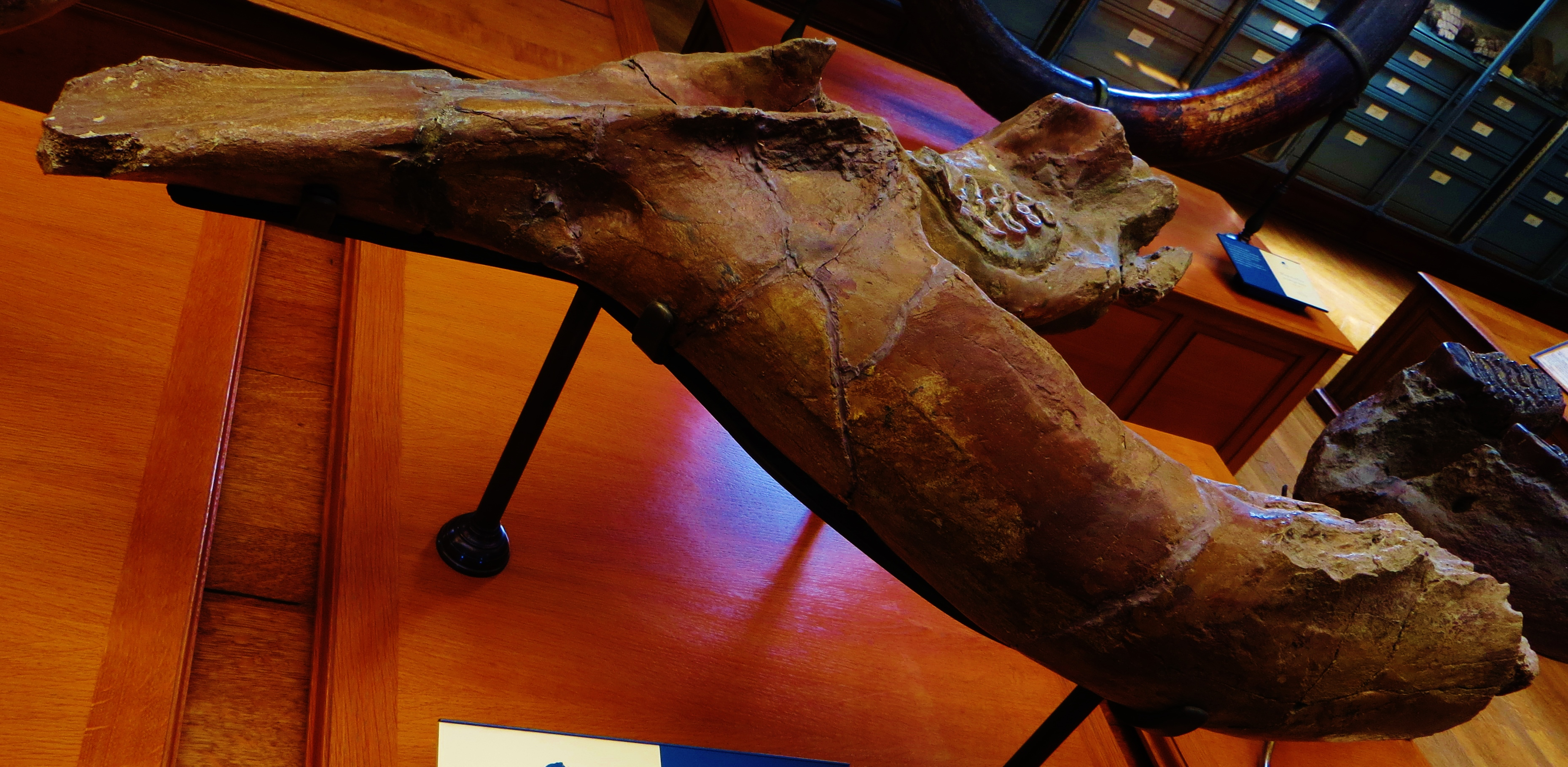
- S. schneideri mandible

Scientific classification
- Kingdom: Animalia
- Phylum: Chordata
- Class: Mammalia
- Infraclass: Placentalia
- Order: Proboscidea
- Family: Elephantidae
- Genus: †Stegodibelodon; Coppens, 1972

Type species
- † Stegodibelodon schneideri Coppens, 1972

= Stegodibelodon =

Stegodibelodon Temporal range: Early Pliocene ~5–4 Ma

Genus of mammals (fossil)

Stegodibelodon is an extinct genus of primitive elephantid known from the Early Pliocene of Africa. It is known only from the Djourab region of northern Chad, where it was discovered in 1964 by the hydrogeologist Jean-Louis Schneider. It differs from the most primitive elephantid Stegotetrabelodon by the absence of lower tusks and a shortened mandibular symphysis, and the more pronounced nature of the lamellae on the molars (with the median sulcus being absent), with each molar possessing at least seven lamellae, though the number of lamellae is low compared to modern elephant teeth, and the teeth are also low crowned (brachydont) relative to modern elephants.

The genus Stegodibelodon and the species Stegodibelodon schneideri were described in 1972 by Yves Coppens. This genus has three referenced fossil collections, one from the Pliocene in Chad and two from the Miocene to Pliocene in Ethiopia. The genus is not well known and opinions differ on whether it is a "true elephant" or not.

Stegodibelodon schneideri is only known from the Djourab region in northern Chad where numerous fossils were unearthed on three sites in the Toros-Menalla fossil sector in 1964 and then from 1998.
