= Baynunah Formation =

- Stratigraphic range: Late Miocene; ~8.0–6.0 Ma
- Type: Geological formation
- Underlies: Shuwaihat Formation

Lithology
- Primary: Sandstone, conglomerate

Location
- Coordinates: 24°1′48″N 53°2′18″E
- Region: Al Gharbia
- Country: United Arab Emirates
- Baynunah Formation (United Arab Emirates)

The Baynunah Formation is a palaeontological formation located in the western region of the Emirate of Abu Dhabi, the United Arab Emirates. It dates to the Upper Miocene epoch of the Neogene period in the Cenozoic Era.

== Fauna ==
According to the following unless specified otherwise.

=== Birds ===
| Taxa | Species | Locality | Stratigraphic position | Material | Notes | Images |
|---|---|---|---|---|---|---|
| Diamantornis | D. laini | Jaw al Dibsa (DBS 2), Hamra (HMR 1, 3, 5), Hadwaniyya (HAD 4, 5, 6), Harmiyyah (HAR 3, 4), Jebel Barakah (JBR 2), Kihal (KIH 3), Ras al Qal’a (RAQ 1, 2), Gerain al Aysh (GAA 3, 4, 8), Ras Dubay’ah (RDB 4), Ruwais (RUW), Shuwaihat (SHU 2, 3, 4, 8), and Umm Al Khabir (UAK 1) | | Multiple collected specimens. | An extinct ratite bird | |
| Struthio | S. cf. karatheodoris | Kihal 2 | | A pelvis, almost complete except for the pubic symphysis region. | | |
| Phalacrocorax | P. sp. | | | A proximal left carpometacarpus, distal right tarsometatarsus, and a tentatively referred proximal right humerus fragment. | | |

=== Mammals ===
==== Artiodactyls ====
===== Bovids =====
| Taxa | Species | Locality | Stratigraphic position | Material | Notes | Images |
|---|---|---|---|---|---|---|
| Afrotragus | A. libycus | GAA2 and HAD3. | | Right frontlet with horn core and left frontlet with horn core. | | |
| Miotragocerus | M. cyrenaicus | GAA2, JBR2, GAA7, HMR1, HMR5, and SHU4. | | A partial cranium, horn cores, partial vertebra, partial left lower m1 or m2, and upper molar or premolar fragment. | An early bovinae. | |
| Pachyportax | P. latidens | GAA2, GAA7, HMR5, and SHU4. | | | | |
| Prostrepsiceros | P. vinayaki | SHU2 | | A basal left horn core. | | |

===== Giraffids =====
| Taxa | Species | Locality | Stratigraphic position | Material | Notes | Images |
|---|---|---|---|---|---|---|
| Paleotragus | P. aff. germaini | locality SHU4 | | A partial skeleton with partial left maxilla. | An early Opaki-like giraffid. | |
| Samotherium | S. cf. sp. | | | An upper molar fragment. | An early giraffid. | |

===== Hippotamids =====
| Taxa | Species | Locality | Stratigraphic position | Material | Notes | Images |
|---|---|---|---|---|---|---|
| Archaeopotamus | A. lothagamensis | | | | | |
| Archaeopotamus | A. qeshta | | | | | |

===== Suidae =====
| Taxa | Species | Locality | Stratigraphic position | Material | Notes | Images |
|---|---|---|---|---|---|---|
| Nyanzachoerus | N. syrticus | | | | | |
| Propotamochoerus | P. hysudricus | | | | | |

==== Carnivorans ====
| Taxa | Species | Locality | Stratigraphic position | Material | Notes | Images |
|---|---|---|---|---|---|---|
| Plesiogulo | P. praecocidens | | | | | |
| Promegaviverra | P. abudhabiensis | Shuwaihat 2 | | A right hemimandible comprising the mandibular corpus and angular process, a broken p2, and complete p3–m1. | A viverridae | |

==== Perissodactyls ====
| Taxa | Species | Locality | Stratigraphic position | Material | Notes | Images |
|---|---|---|---|---|---|---|
| Hipparion | H. abudhabiense | | | | | |

==== Proboscideans ====
| Taxa | Species | Locality | Stratigraphic position | Material | Notes | Images |
|---|---|---|---|---|---|---|
| Stegotetrabelodon | S. emiratus | | | | A primitive elephantid. | |
| Tetralophodon | Indeterminate | | | | A gomphothere. | |
| Gomphotheriidae | Indeterminate. | | | | A gomphothere. | |
| Deinotherium | D. aff. bozasi | | | | A deinotheriid | |

==== Rodents ====
| Taxa | Species | Locality | Stratigraphic position | Material | Notes | Images |
|---|---|---|---|---|---|---|
| Abudhabia | A. baynunensis | | | | | |
| Dendromus | D. sp | | | | | |
| Jebelus | J. rex | | | | | |
| Myocricetodon | M. sp | | | | | |
| Parapelomys | P. cf. charkhensis | | | | | |
| Protohummus | P. dango | | | | | |

=== Fish ===
| Taxon | Notes | Image |
|---|---|---|
| Bagrus | | |
| Clarias | At least two species (possibly 3) | |
| Labeobarbus | Cyprinid | |
| ?Capoeta | Probably Capoeta | |
| Cichlidae | "African chichlid" (at least one species) | |
| Percomorpha | Intermediate | |
| Pristidae | | |
| Dasyatidae | | |

=== Stegotetrabelodon footprints ===
Footprints attributed to Stegotetrabelodon have been found in the formation.

== See also ==
- Cenozoic Asia
- Paleontological sites of Asia
- History of the United Arab Emirates
- List of fossil sites
