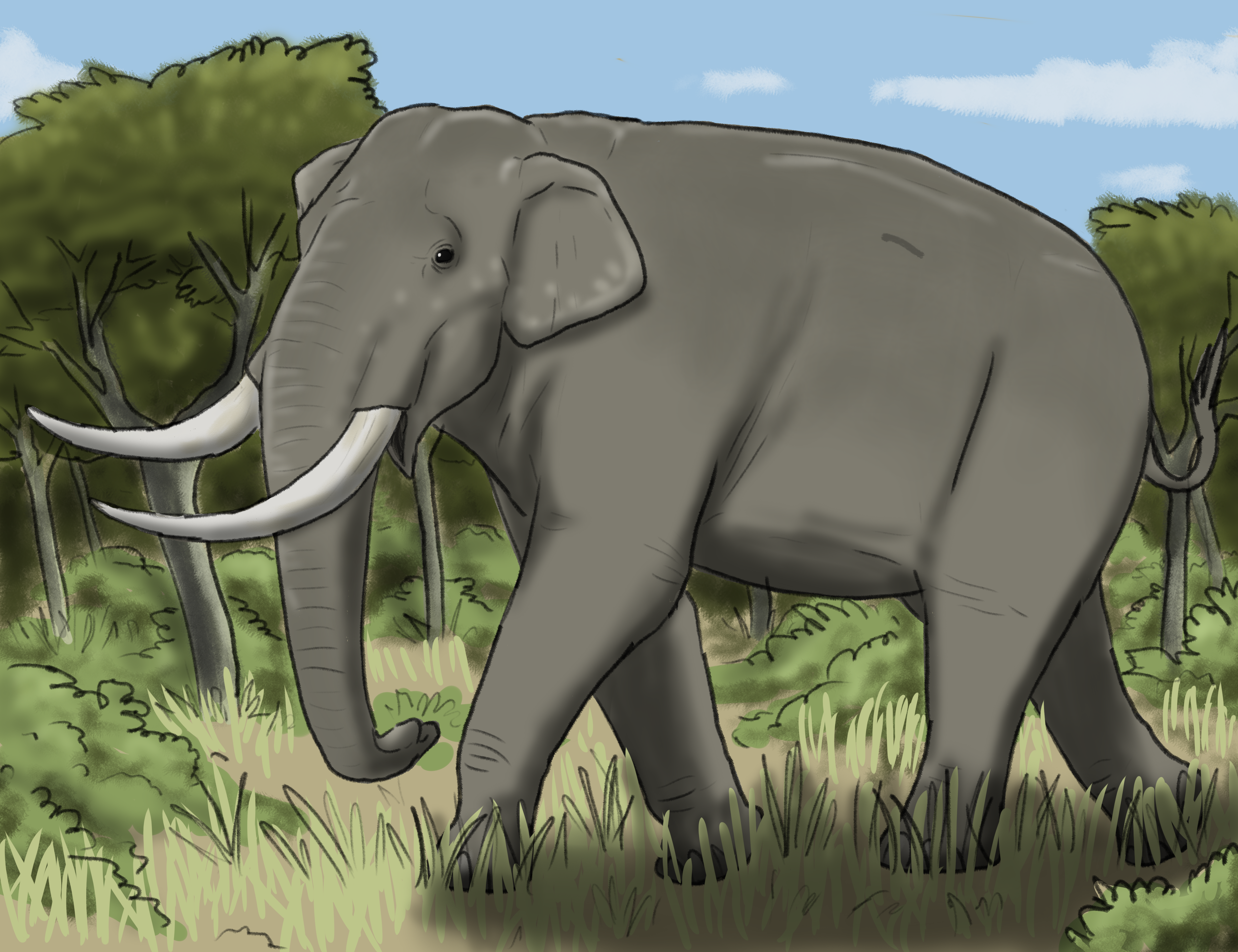
- Reconstruction of Primelephas

Scientific classification
- Kingdom: Animalia
- Phylum: Chordata
- Class: Mammalia
- Order: Proboscidea
- Family: Elephantidae
- Subfamily: Elephantinae
- Genus: †Primelephas; Maglio, 1970

Type species
- †Primelephas gomphotheroides Maglio, 1970

Species
- †Primelephas gomphotheroides Maglio, 1970; †Primelephas korotorensis? (Coppens, 1965) (Note: Sanders 2023 gives the authority for P. korotorensis as Maglio, 1970 apparently regarding Coppens' original naming as invalid, while Mackaye et al. 2008 gives the authority as Coppens 1965 accepting Stegodon korotorensis as the original nomen)

= Primelephas =

Primelephas Temporal range: late Miocene – Pliocene ~7.2–4 Ma

Extinct genus of mammals

Primelephas is an extinct genus of primitive elephantid that lived in Africa during the Late Miocene to early Pliocene c. 7.2-4 million years ago, with fossils having been found in Kenya, Ethiopia, Chad, Uganda and Tanzania. The name of the genus suggests 'first elephant'.

Although commonly asserted to have retained lower tusks, this has been questioned, and it has been suggested that Primelephas actually had a tuskless lower jaw, with supposed tusked lower jaws actually belonging to Stegotetrabelodon instead. One partially complete skull is known, the Ugandan NY 46’92, which belonged to a subadult around 12.5-14.3 years old at time of death. This skull had inflated nasal process of the premaxillae (the tusk containing bones), as well as tusk sockets which were only weakly divergent outwards from each other. Members of the genus retained permanent premolar teeth, unlike modern elephants, with its teeth being relatively primitive compared to modern elephants, such as having a low lamellae/plate count and being relatively low crowned. Analysis of humerus bones suggests that it reached a size comparable to living African bush elephants (Loxodonta africana).

The type species, Primelephas gomphotheroides, was described by Vincent Maglio in 1970, with the specific epithet indicating the fossil specimens were gomphothere-like. Primelephas korotorensis is the only other species to be assigned to the genus, which was originally named as Stegodon korotorensis by Coppens in 1965. A number of scholars have suggested that there is only one valid species of Primelephas, for which the name Primelephas korotorensis has priority due to the species being named earlier.

The relationship of Primelephas to other elephantids has been debated. While some scholars have suggested a closer relationship with Elephas (containing the living Asian elephant) and Mammuthus (mammoths) than to Loxodonta (which contains living African elephants), others have suggested that Primelephas diverged prior to the split between African elephants and the ancestors of Asian elephants and mammoths.
