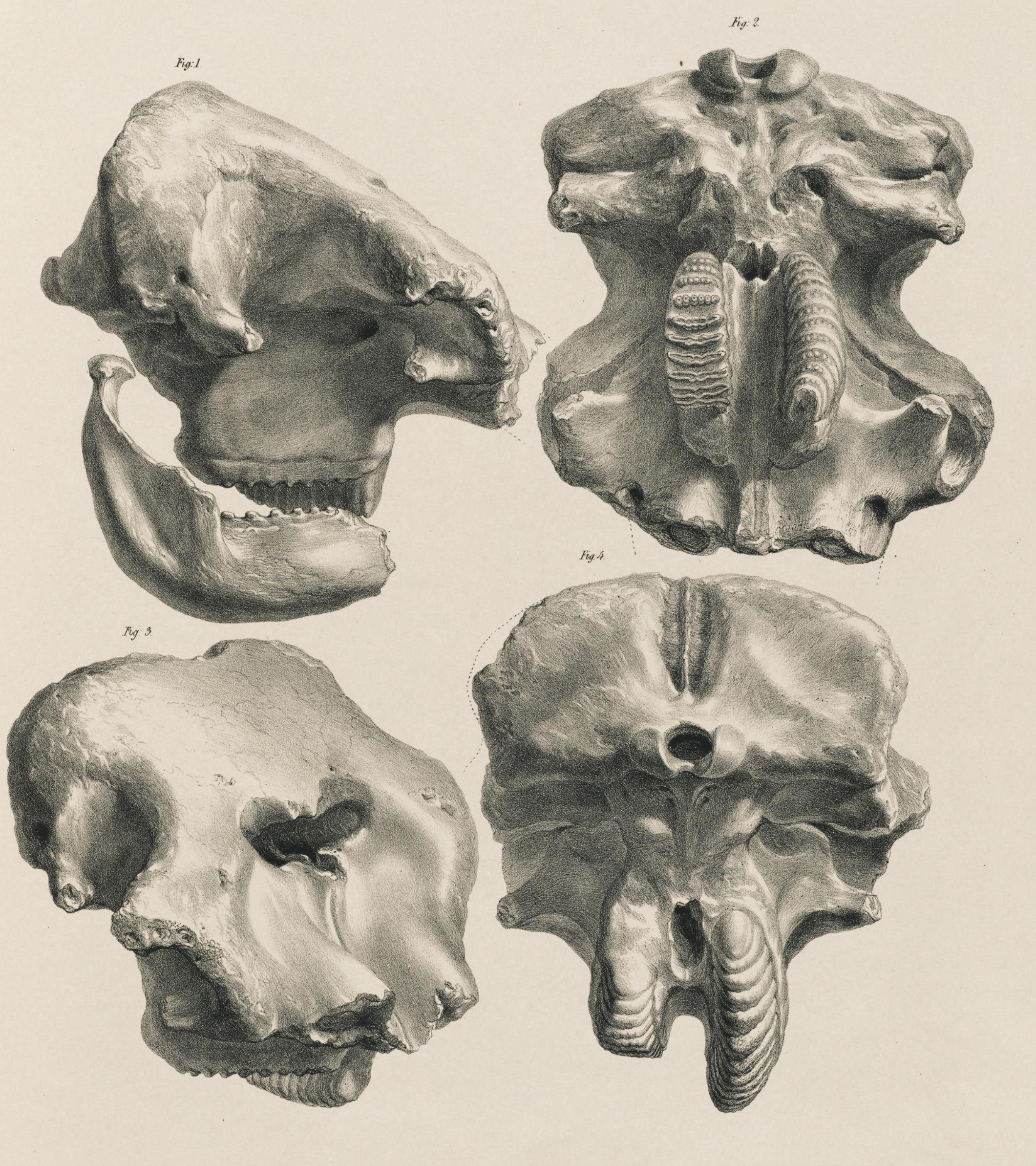
- Partial skull in various views

Scientific classification
- Kingdom: Animalia
- Phylum: Chordata
- Class: Mammalia
- Order: Proboscidea
- Family: Elephantidae
- Genus: Elephas
- Species: †E. planifrons

Binomial name
- †Elephas planifrons Falconer & Cautley, 1846

= Elephas planifrons =

Elephas planifrons Temporal range: Late Pliocene–Early Pleistocene

Extinct species of mammal

Elephas planifrons is an extinct species of elephant, known from the Late Pliocene-Early Pleistocene of the Indian subcontinent and probably South East Asia (Java, Indonesia).

== Description ==
The number of lamellae on the third molars is typically in the range of 11 to 15. Members of the species retained permanent premolars, unlike living Asian elephants.

== Ecology ==
Isotopic evidence suggests that the species had a grazing based diet.

== Evolution ==
Elephas planifrons represents one of the earliest dispersals of elephants outside of Africa, first arriving on the Indian subcontinent around 3.6 million years ago (though some authors have suggested a much earlier age over 5 million years ago). The date of the last record of the species is highly uncertain, with estimates ranging from 2.5 million to 800,000 years ago. While only definitively reported from the Indian subcontinent, possible E. planifrons remains have been reported from Indonesia, and the species may be closely related to the Indonesian dwarf elephant genus Stegoloxodon. A 2020 PhD thesis suggested that the species was not a true member of the genus Elephas, but should instead be considered a member of the genus Phanagoroloxodon with the African Pliocene species "Elephas" recki brumpti considered to be a synonym of "E". planifrons. A later publication by William J. Sanders in 2023 stated that while it was "reasonable" to suggest that E. recki brumpti and E. plantifrons were closely related or the same species, it was "needless overreach" to place them in Phanagoroloxodon. Additional specimen mentioned as E. planifrons was found in Indonesia (Semedo, Central Java) although further research is required.
