= Selenetherium =

Scientific classification
- Domain: Eukaryota
- Kingdom: Animalia
- Phylum: Chordata
- Class: Mammalia
- Order: Proboscidea
- Family: Elephantidae
- Subfamily: †Stegotetrabelodontinae
- Genus: †Selenetherium; Mackaye, Brunet & Tassy, 2005

Extinct genus of elephants

Selenetherium ("moon mammal") is an extinct genus of elephantid proboscidean. The type and only species is Selenetherium kolleensis, known from an incomplete mandible. It was found in the early (Zanclean) Pliocene sediments of Kolle, Chad.
