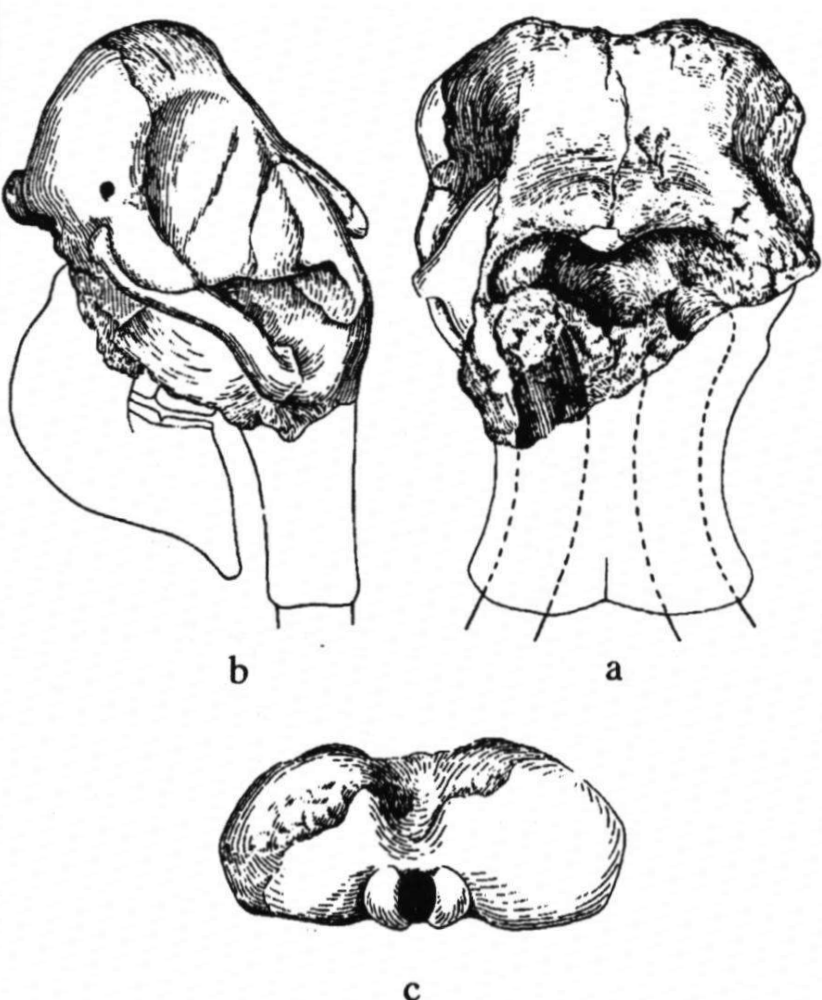
- Drawing of the skull in various views

Scientific classification
- Kingdom: Animalia
- Phylum: Chordata
- Class: Mammalia
- Infraclass: Placentalia
- Order: Proboscidea
- Family: Elephantidae
- Genus: †Phanagoroloxodon; Garutt, 1957
- Species: †P. mammontoides

Binomial name
- †Phanagoroloxodon mammontoides Garutt, 1957

= Phanagoroloxodon =

Phanagoroloxodon Temporal range: Late Pliocene–Early Pleistocene

Extinct genus of elephantid

Phanagoroloxodon is a genus of extinct elephant. It is known from one species, Phanagoroloxodon mammontoides, which is described from a partial skull from Russia, of probable Late Pliocene-Early Pleistocene age.

== History of discovery ==
The holotype of Phanagoroloxodon was found on the banks of the Psekups river in the northwestern Caucasus of Russia, and was given to the Krasnodar State Historical and Archaeological Memorial Museum-Reserve by I.N. Chistyakov in 1885. It was found in the museum's collections by Wadim E. Garutt in 1957, and was named in that same year. Other possible remains of the species include molar teeth described from the nearby Sinyaya Balka site near the eastern shore of the Sea of Azov. In 2005, a second species Phanagoroloxodon irtyshensis was described based on a skull found near Pavlodar in Kazakhstan, but this may represent a specimen of the steppe mammoth (Mammuthus trogontherii).

== Description ==
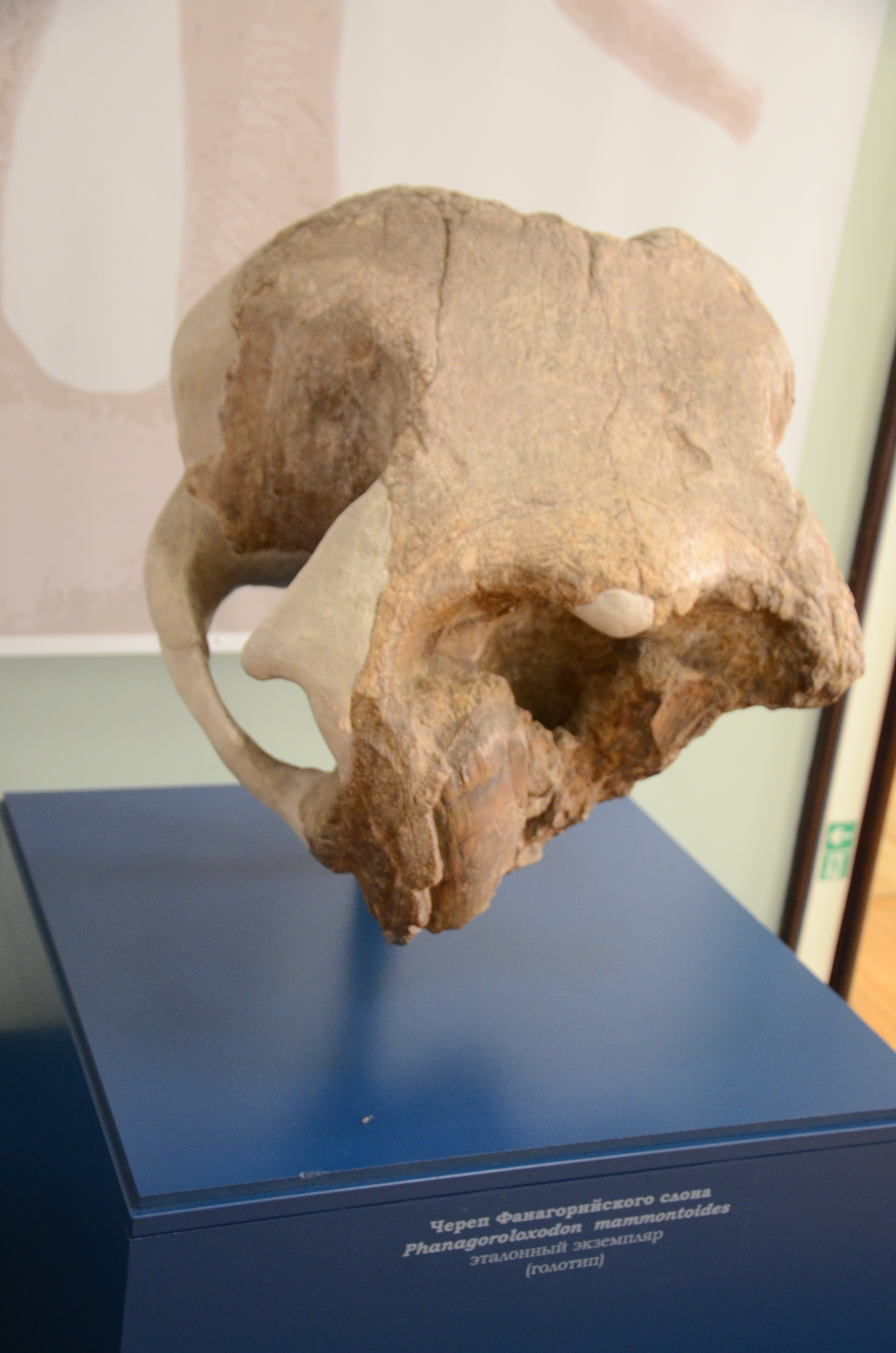
Skull on display

Phanagoroloxodon resembles Elephas (which contains the living Asian elephant) and mammoths (genus Mammuthus) in many regards. Like Elephas, the top of the skull has a saddle-like groove running along the midline and the nasal process is rounded. On the other hand, the occipital region of the skull almost completely lacks tubercles, the tusks are suggested to be twisted, similar to those of mammoths.

== Taxonomy ==
Phanagoroloxodon has been suggested to be more closely related to Elephas and Mammuthus than to Loxodonta (which contains the living African elephants) due to it combining characteristics of both of these genera, with Garutt proposing that it could be ancestral to both Elephas and Mammuthus. Garutt assigned it to a tribe of its own, Phanagorodontini (also spelled Phanagoroloxodontini by Garutt) in 1991. A 2020 PhD thesis by Steven Zhang suggested that Elephas recki brumpti from the Pliocene of East Africa should be subsumed into the species Elephas planifrons, known from the Late Pliocene-Early Pleistocene of the Indian subcontinent, and that this species should be placed as a second species of Phanagoroloxodon. William J. Sanders in his 2023 book Evolution and Fossil Record of the African Proboscidea, suggested that while Zhang's revision of the Elephas recki complex "has merit", and that while it was "reasonable" to suggest that E. recki brumpti and E. plantifrons were closely related or the same species, it was "needless overreach" to place them in Phanagoroloxodon, and that Garutt's work on the taxonomy and relationships of Phanagoroloxodon were "needlessly byzantine" and the proposed tribe Phanagoroloxodontini "is irrelevant given what is known about the early fossil record of Mammuthus and genetic-based hypotheses about the timing of divergence of [elephantids]".

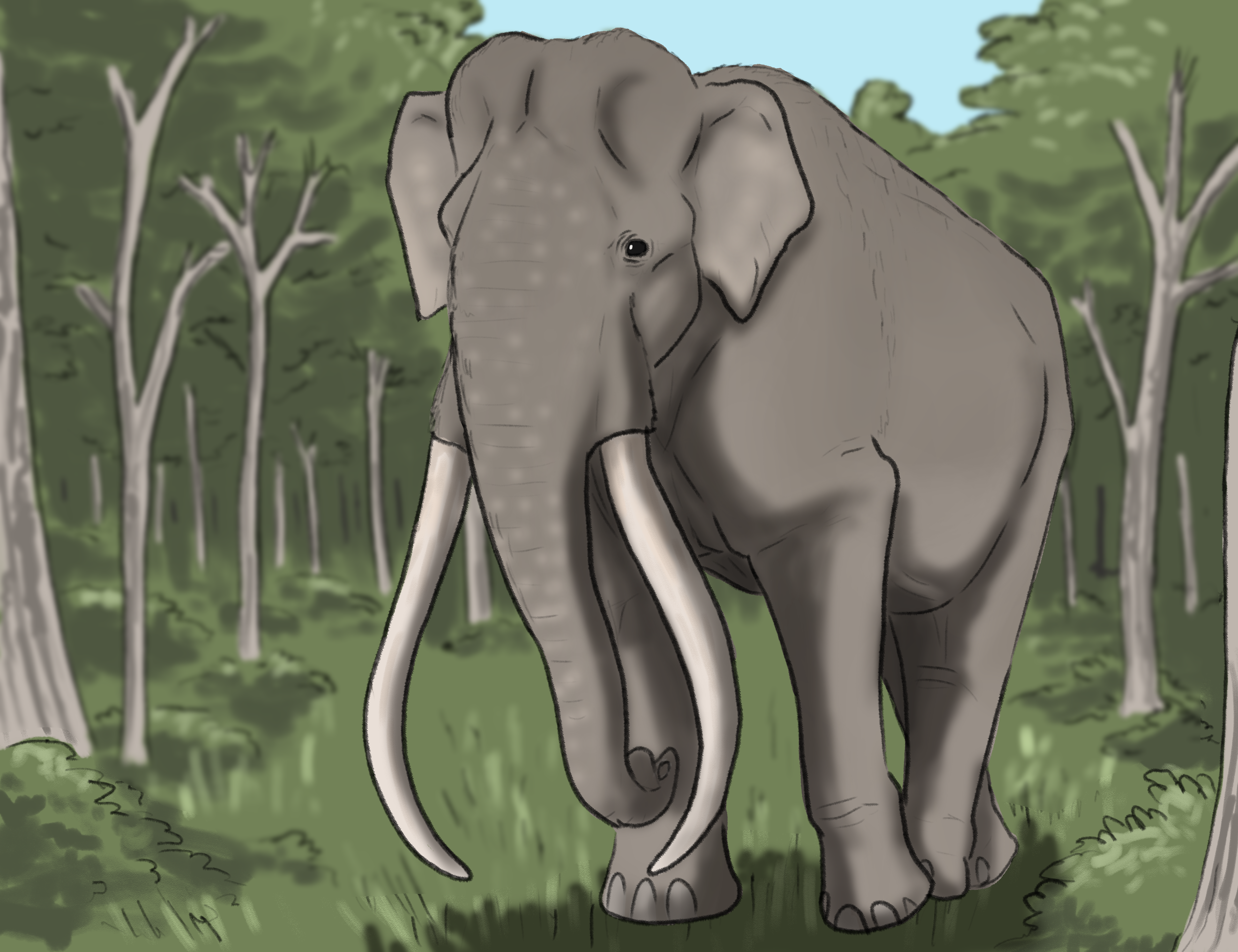
Reconstruction of Phanagoroloxodon
