= Parachoerodon =

Parachoerodon Temporal range: Miocene, 19–5.3 Ma

Scientific classification
- Kingdom: Animalia
- Phylum: Chordata
- Class: Mammalia
- Infraclass: Placentalia
- Order: Proboscidea
- Family: †Choerolophodontidae
- Genus: †Parachoerodon; Li and Wang, 2026

Species
- P. rhynchus Li and Wang, 2026; P. chioticus (Tobien, 1980); P. connexum (Hopwood, 1935)

Extinct genus of mammals

Parachoerodon is an extinct genus of proboscideans that lived during the Miocene of Eurasia.

== Taxonomy ==
Two species in this genus, P. chioticus and P. connexum, were formerly assigned to Choerolophodon and Gomphotherium respectively. However, recent studies demonstrated that the former is generically distinct from Choerolophodon and that the latter is not assignable to Gomphotherium, necessitating assignment of these two taxa to a new genus, Parachoerodon.
