= Eochoerodon =

Eochoerodon Temporal range: Early Miocene

Scientific classification
- Kingdom: Animalia
- Phylum: Chordata
- Class: Mammalia
- Order: Proboscidea
- Family: †Choerolophodontidae
- Genus: †Eochoerodon; Li & Wang, 2026

Type species
- Eochoerodon guangheensis (Wang & Deng, 2011)

Other species
- Eochoerodon palaeindicus (Lydekker, 1884)

Synonyms
- Synyonyms of E. palaeindicus; Mastodon (Trilophodon) angustidens var. palaeindicus Lydekker, 1884; Synyonyms of E. guangheensis; Choerolophodon guangheensis Wang & Deng, 2011

Extinct genus of proboscideans

Eochoerodon is an extinct genus of choerolophodontid proboscideans that lived during the Miocene of what is now Asia (China and Pakistan). The genus consists of two species: the type species, E. guangheensis from China, and a second species, Eochoerodon palaeindicus from Pakistan. Both were formerly included in the more derived genus Choerolophodon but were reclassified based on skeletal differences in 2026 by Li & Wang.

E. guangheensis (originally Choerolophodon guangheensis) was named by Wang & Deng (2011) based on material excavated from the Dalanggou quarry of the Linxia Basin in Gansu Province, China.
