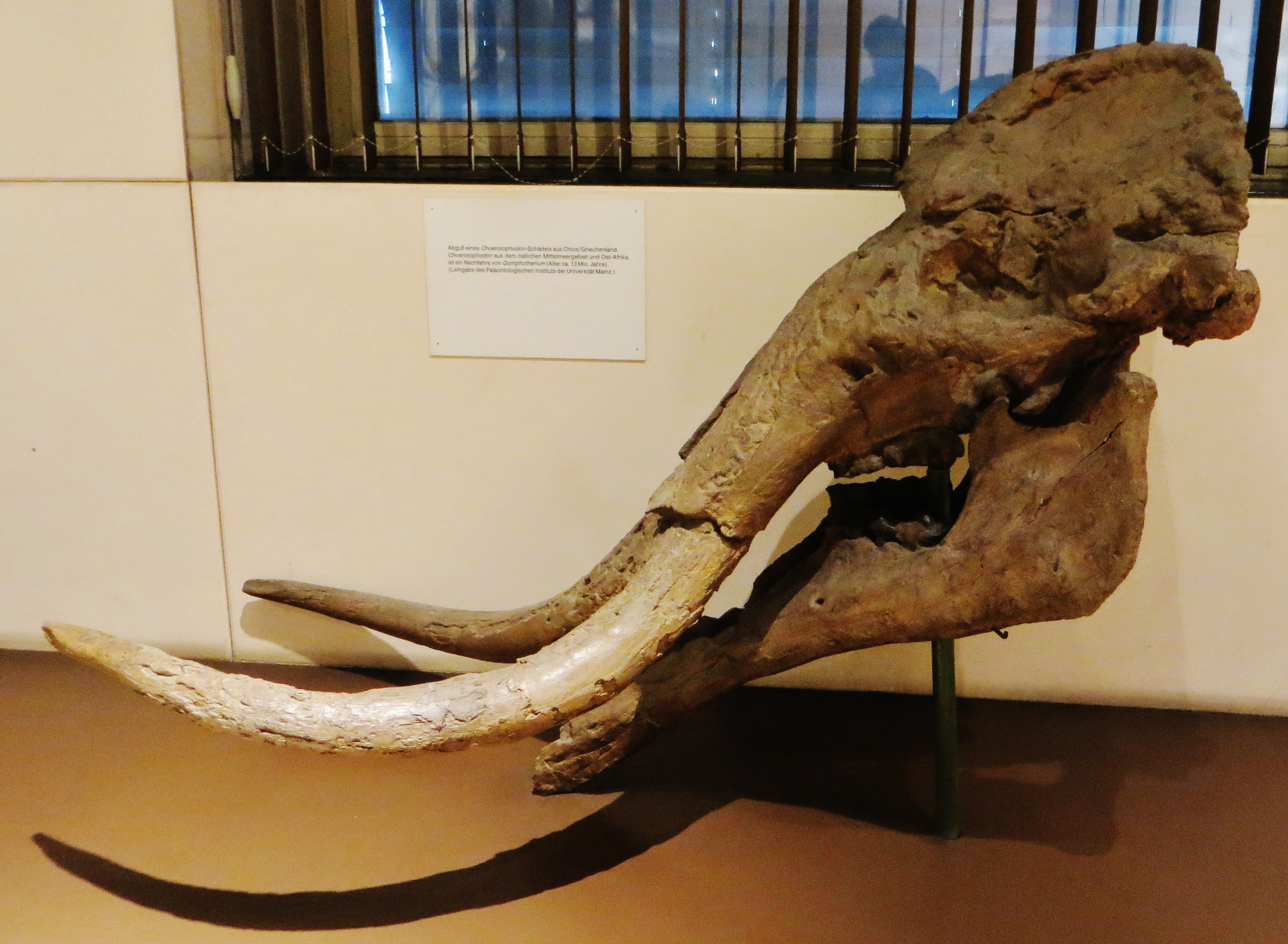
- Skull

Scientific classification
- Kingdom: Animalia
- Phylum: Chordata
- Class: Mammalia
- Order: Proboscidea
- Family: †Choerolophodontidae
- Genus: †Choerolophodon; Schlesinger, 1917

Species
- C. pentelici (Gaudry and Lartet, 1856) (type); C. anatolicus (Ozansoy 1965); C. corrugatus (Pilgrim, 1913); C. ngorora (Maglio, 1974)

Synonyms
- Mastodon pentelicus Gaudry and Lartet, 1856

= Choerolophodon =

Choerolophodon Temporal range: Miocene, 19–5.3 Ma

Extinct genus of mammals

Choerolophodon is an extinct genus of choerolophodontid proboscidean that lived during the Miocene in Eurasia and Africa.

== Description ==
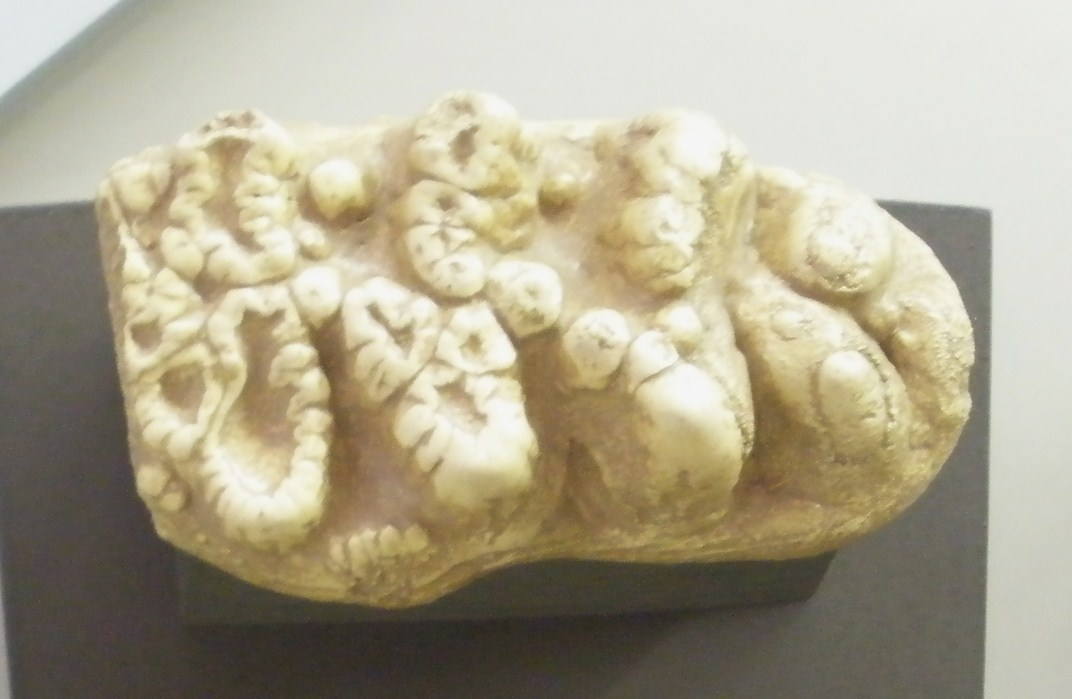
Molar

The tusks growing from the upper jaw are long and strongly curved, with one large mostly complete tusk from the Chalkidiki Peninsula of Greece having a total length of around 2.5 metres (8.2 ft), with a likely total weight when complete of around 70 kilograms (150 lb). The molar teeth are trilophodont and bunodont. The half-lophids are chevroned. The accessory conules are multiplied (choerodont), and the enamel is corrugated (ptychodont). The lower jaw has an unusual combination of being long, but lacking tusks/incisors, a trait only shared among proboscideans with the North American gomphothere genera Eubelodon and Gnathabelodon. It has been suggested that instead of teeth, the end of the lower jaw housed a keratinous cutting blade.

== Taxonomy ==
The name Choerolophodon was erected for "Mastodon" pentelicus from Greece by Schlesinger (1917) based on the discovery of new material from the pentelicus type locality. A 2022 study considered Choerolophodon to be a basal member of Elephantida, with Amebelodontidae and Gomphotheriidae more closely related to each other than either is to Choerolophodon.

Numerous species of Choerolophodon are known: C. pentelicus and C. anatolicus from Southeast Europe (Turkey, Greece, Bulgaria) and the Middle East, C. corrugatus from the Indian subcontinent, and C. ngorora and C. zaltaniensis from Africa. Choerolophodon previously included nearly all choerolophontid species. A 2026 study reassigned "C." chioticus from Greece and "C." connexus from China to the new genus Parachoerodon. They also assigned to "C." guangheensis from China and "C." palaeindicus from the Indian subcontinent to the new genus Eochoerodon.

== Ecology ==
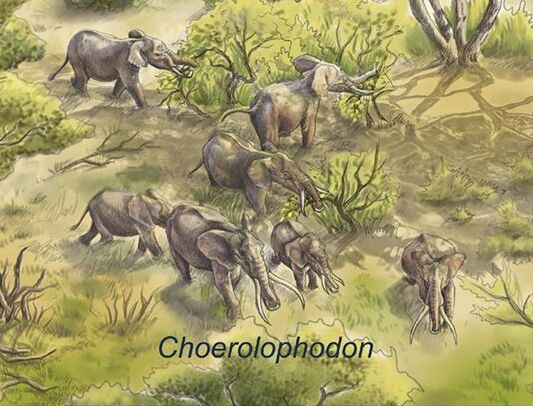
Reconstruction of a herd of Choerolophodon

Dental microwear analysis of specimens from Greece suggest that these individuals were grazers, while mesowear analysis of specimens from East Africa suggest varying browsing and grazing-dominated mixed feeding diets, depending on locality. The presence of Cholerolophodon in a fossiliferous locality has been used to infer that the environment was an open one.
