= Protohummus =

Protohummus Temporal range: Late Miocene

Scientific classification
- Kingdom: Animalia
- Phylum: Chordata
- Class: Mammalia
- Infraclass: Placentalia
- Order: Rodentia
- Family: Thryonomyidae
- Genus: †Protohummus; Kraatz et al., 2013
- Species: †P. dango

Binomial name
- †Protohummus dango Kraatz et al., 2013

Extinct genus of rodents

Protohummus is an extinct genus of thryonomyid that lived during the Late Miocene.

== Distribution ==
Protohummus dango lived in what is now the United Arab Emirates, its fossils having been found in the Baynunah Formation.
