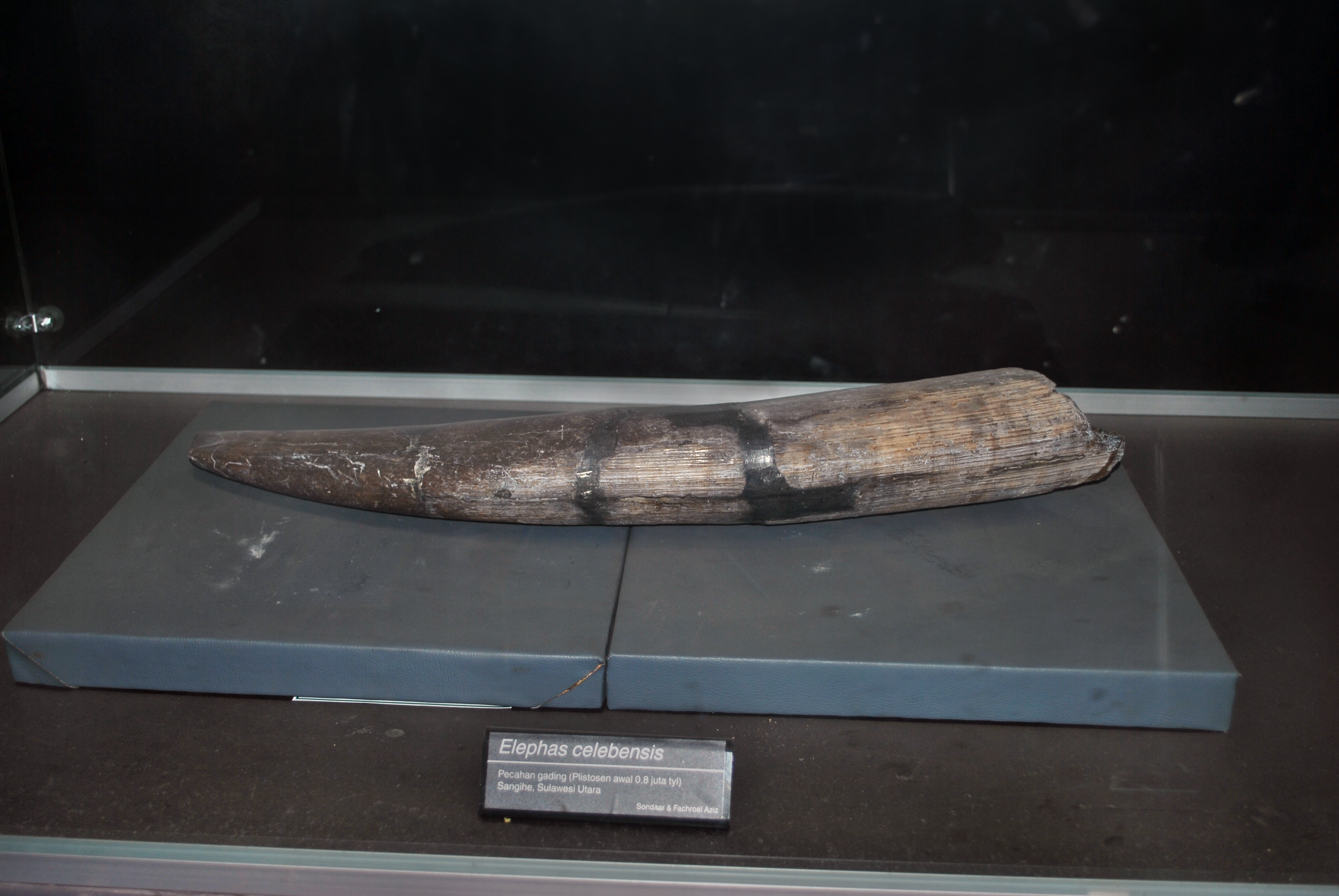
- Tusk of Stegoloxodon celebensis from Sangihe, North Sulawesi, on display in the Bandung Geological Museum

Scientific classification
- Kingdom: Animalia
- Phylum: Chordata
- Class: Mammalia
- Order: Proboscidea
- Family: Elephantidae
- Genus: †Stegoloxodon; Kretzoi, 1950

Species
- S. celebensis (Hooijer, 1949); S. indonesicus Kretzoi, 1950

= Stegoloxodon =

Stegoloxodon Temporal range: Early Pleistocene

Extinct genus of dwarf elephant

Stegoloxodon is an extinct genus of dwarf elephant known from the Early Pleistocene of Indonesia. It contains two species, S. indonesicus from Java, and S. celebensis from Sulawesi. Its relationship with other elephants is uncertain.

== Taxonomy ==
S. celebensis was originally described as Archidiskodon celebensis in 1949 by Dirk Albert Hooijer. S. indonesicus was originally described by Miklós Kretzoi based on a molar found near Bumiayu, originally attributed to Elephas planifrons, who coined the genus Stegoloxodon to contain the species. A 1973 paper argued for the synonymy of the two species, which was later rejected, though they are usually considered closely related. Some later papers referred the species to Elephas. A paper by Paul Yves Sondaar in 1984 started a trend of referring to the two species to the genus "Elephas" with quotation remarks, reflecting uncertainty about their placement in the genus. A 2008 review by Markov and Saegusa resurrected the genus Stegoloxodon to house the two species.

The relationship with other elephants has been considered uncertain, which has been suggested to be the result of dwarfism-caused changes to its morphology. Some authors have suggested a close relationship to Loxodonta (which is not known outside of Africa) or to Elephas planifrons (which is known from the Late Pliocene-Early Pleistocene of South Asia).

== Description ==
Both S. indonesicus and S. celebensis were dwarf elephants substantially smaller than mainland elephant species as a result of insular dwarfism, with S. celebensis estimated to have been around 150 cm (4.9 ft) tall. The molar plates of both species are low-crowned with thick enamel, with the lamellae frequency being notably higher in S. celebensis than in S. indonesicus. Both species retained permanent premolars. Lower tusks are present in some adult individuals of S. celebensis, unlike modern elephants, which is either suggested to have been a retained ancestral trait lost in modern elephants, or the result of paedomorphosis as a consequence of dwarfism, with the mandibular symphysis of S. celebensis being downwardly turned. The skull of S. celebensis is short and tall, with fronto-parietal crests, and slightly curved upper tusks.

== Ecology ==
Isotope analysis suggests that S. celebensis was a flexible feeder, while S. indonesicus is suggested to have been a dedicated browser on C3 vegetation in forested habitats. Stegoloxodon co-existed alongside other proboscidean species, with S. celebensis living alongside the similarly sized dwarf Stegodon species Stegodon sompoensis, and a larger unnamed Stegodon species while Stegoxolodon indonesicus co-existed alongside the gomphothere Sinomastodon bumiajuensis, and an unnamed dwarf species of Stegodon.
