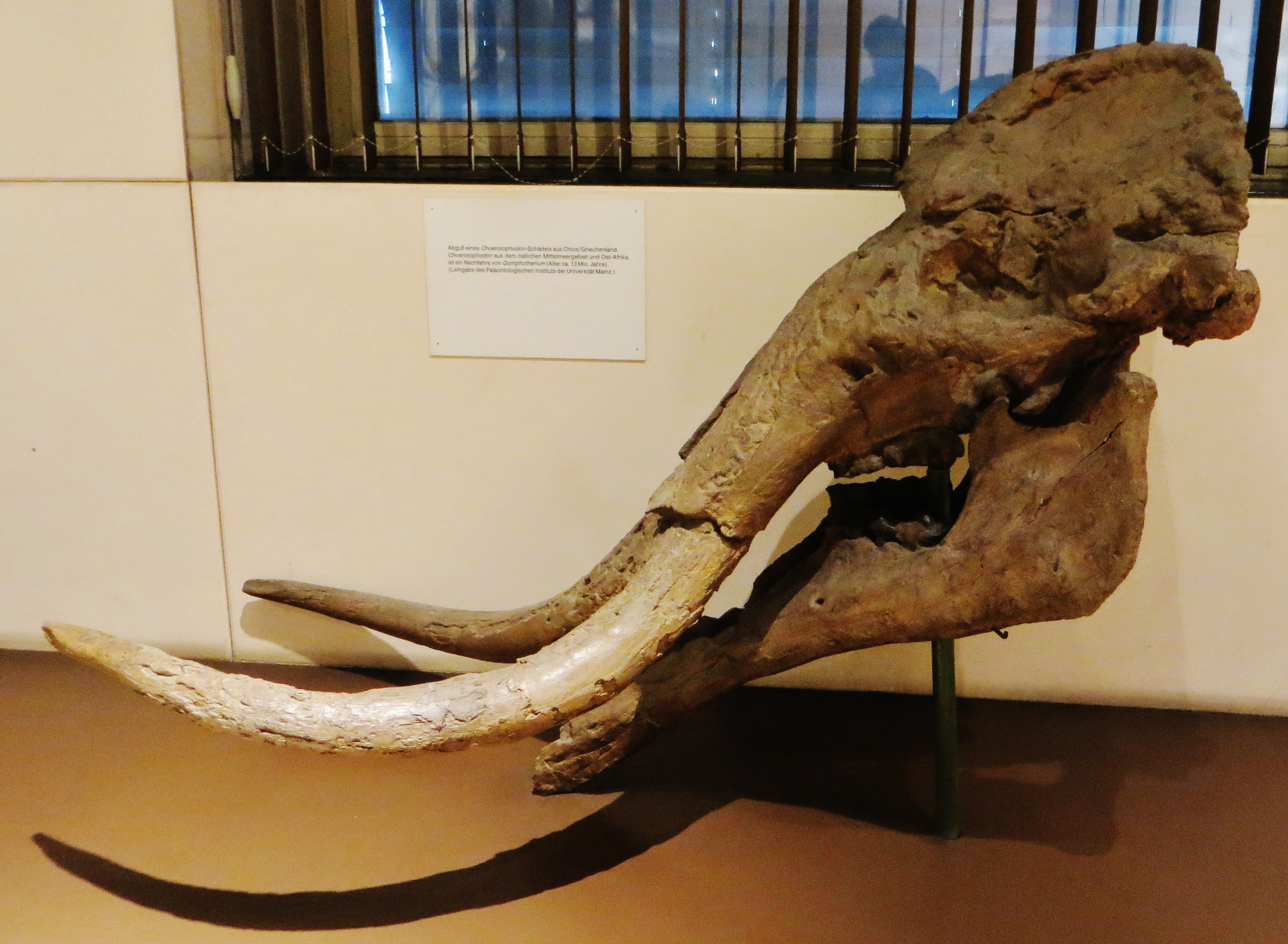

Scientific classification
- Kingdom: Animalia
- Phylum: Chordata
- Class: Mammalia
- Order: Proboscidea
- Clade: Elephantida
- Family: †Choerolophodontidae; Gaziry, 1976

Genera
- †Afrochoerodon Pickford, 2001; †Eochoerodon Li & Wang, 2026; †Choerolophodon Schlesinger, 1917; †Gnathabelodon? Barbour & Sternberg, 1935; †Parachoerodon Li & Wang, 2026

= Choerolophodontidae =

Choerolophodontidae Temporal range: 17–7 Ma Miocene

Extinct family of mammals

Choerolophodontidae is an extinct family of proboscideans belonging to Elephantida. Two genera are widely recognised, Afrochoerodon and Choerolophodon.

== Taxonomy ==
Although usually classified as part of Gomphotheriidae, cladistic analysis recovers choerolophodont gomphotheres as basal to trilophodont gomphotheres and therefore a distinct family. Some studies have included the North American Gnathabelodon within the family.

== Distribution ==
Fossils of choerolophodontids have been found in Africa, China, Anatolia, and the Balkans.
