= Khamsaconus =

Khamsaconus Temporal range: Early Eocene, 55 Ma

Scientific classification
- Kingdom: Animalia
- Phylum: Chordata
- Class: Mammalia
- Infraclass: Placentalia
- Superorder: Afrotheria
- Genus: †Khamsaconus; Sudre et al., 1993

Type species
- Khamsaconus bulbosus Sudre et al., 1993

Genus of mammals

Khamsaconus ("five-coned", referring to its tooth anatomy) is a genus of extinct mammal, possibly an early relative of elephants.

== Taxonomy ==
The holotype and only certain specimen of Khamsaconus, a lower fourth premolar, was recovered from the N'Tagourt 2 locality of the Ouarzazate Basin, Morocco. A paper describing it was published in 1993 by Jean Sudre and colleagues. They believed it to be a condylarth, part of a now-obsolete grouping of early Cenozoic mammals. Five years later, Emmanuel Gheerbrant and colleagues both examined the original tooth and a new specimen (an incomplete molar), concluding instead that Khamsaconus was a basal proboscidean. A paper from 2005 suggested that this tooth belonged to a hyracoid close to Seggeurius.

=== Classification ===
The position of Khamsaconus within Afrotheria is uncertain. While often regarded as a proboscidean, the fact it is known from a single tooth leaves its status as a member of that group questionable. Furthermore, the anatomy of that tooth is not entirely consistent with a proboscidean affinity. Khamsaconus' teeth have a single layer of radial tooth enamel, as opposed to two layers as in other proboscideans, although this could be an evolutionary reversal correlating to body size.

== Description ==
Khamsaconus is a fairly small mammal. In 2026, Asier Larramendi and Marco P. Ferretti estimated, assuming a proboscidean identity, that it may have stood 18 cm (0.59 ft) at the shoulder and weighed 3.5 kg (7.7 lb). The known premolar is generally akin to that of Phosphatherium, though differs in that it has a proportionally larger crown with bulbous cusps.
