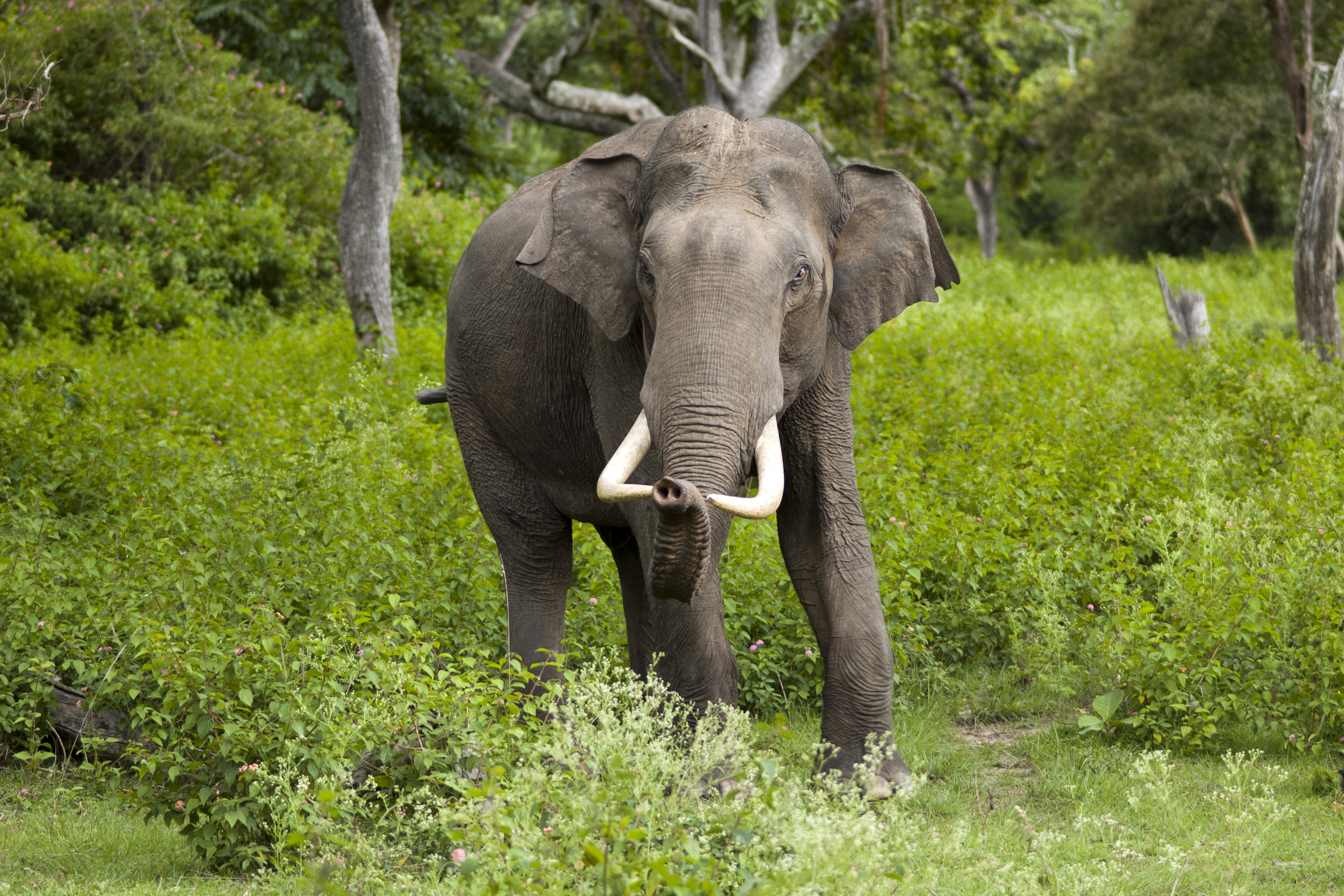
- A male Asian elephant (Elephas maximus) in the wild at Bandipur National Park in India
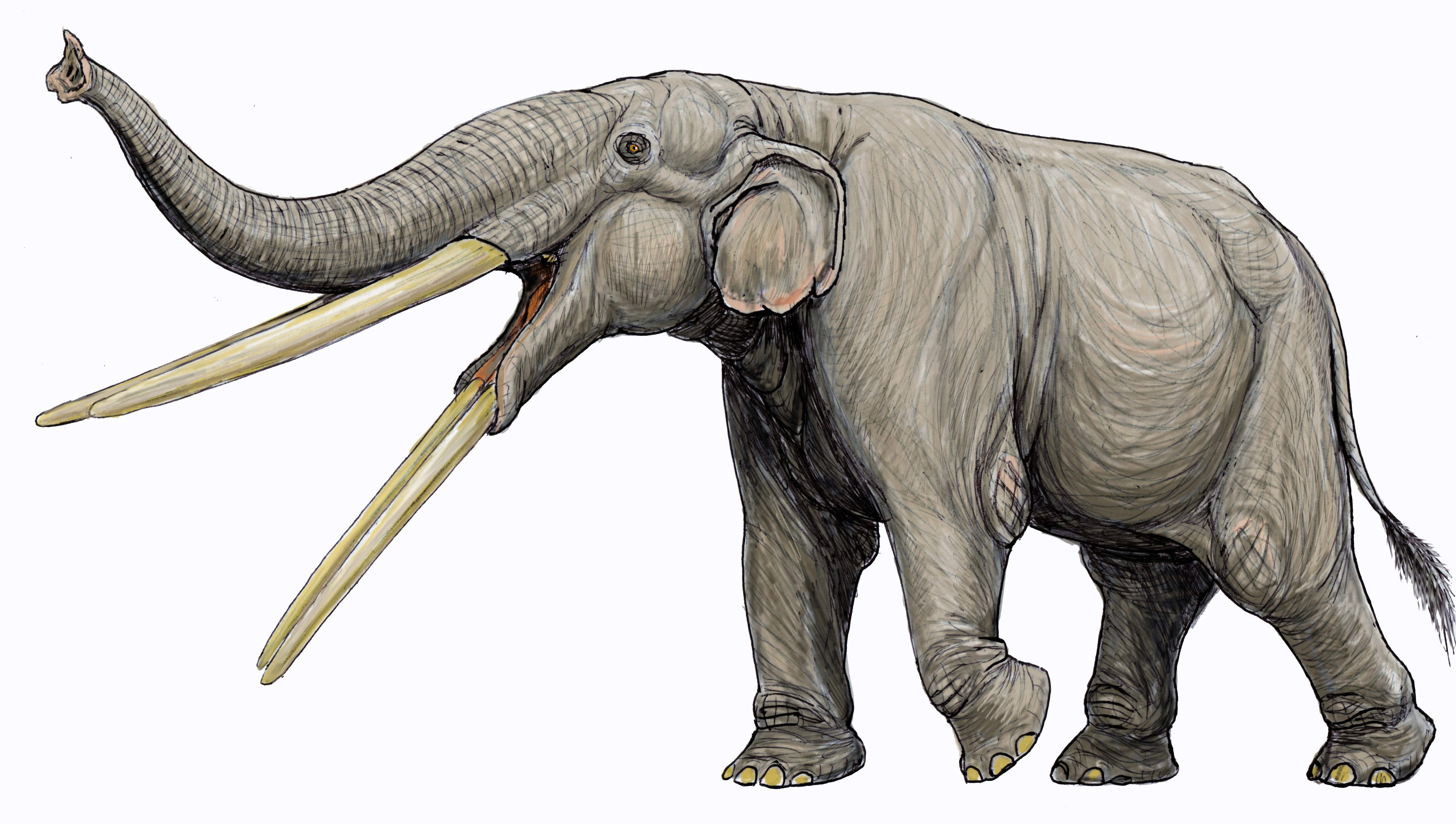
- Life restoration of Stegotetrabelodon

Scientific classification
- Kingdom: Animalia
- Phylum: Chordata
- Class: Mammalia
- Infraclass: Placentalia
- Order: Proboscidea
- Superfamily: Elephantoidea
- Family: Elephantidae; Gray, 1821

Type genus
- Elephas Linnaeus, 1758

Genera
- Elephas Linnaeus, 1758; Loxodonta Anonymous, 1827; †Mammuthus Brookes, 1828; †Palaeoloxodon Matsumoto, 1925; †Phanagoroloxodon Garutt, 1957; †Primelephas Maglio, 1970; †Selenetherium Mackaye, Brunet & Tassy, 2005; †Stegodibelodon Coppens, 1972; †Stegoloxodon Kretzoi, 1950; †Stegotetrabelodon Petrocchi, 1941

Synonyms
- Elephasidae Lesson, 1842

= Elephantidae =

Elephantidae Temporal range: Late Miocene – Holocene

Family of mammals

Elephantidae is a family of large, herbivorous proboscidean mammals which includes the living elephants (belonging to the genera Elephas and Loxodonta), as well as a number of extinct genera like Mammuthus (mammoths) and Palaeoloxodon. They are large terrestrial mammals with a snout modified into a trunk and teeth modified into tusks. Most genera and species in the family are extinct. Some extinct members are among the largest known terrestrial mammals ever.

The family was first described by John Edward Gray in 1821, and later assigned to taxonomic ranks within the order Proboscidea. Elephantidae has been revised by various authors to include or exclude other extinct proboscidean genera.

== Description ==
Elephantids are distinguished from more basal proboscideans like gomphotheres by their teeth, which have parallel lophs, formed from the merger of the cusps found in the teeth of more basal proboscideans, which are bound by cementum. In later elephantids, these lophs became narrow lamellae/plates, which are pockets of enamel filled with dentine, which are arranged successively like a concertina, with the lamellae/plates being bound together by cement. The number of lophs/lamellae per tooth, as well as the tooth crown height (hypsodonty) is greater in later species. Elephantids chew using a proal jaw movement involving a forward stroke of the lower jaws, different from the oblique movement using side to side motion of the jaws in more primitive proboscideans. The most primitive elephantid Stegotetrabelodon had a long lower jaw with lower tusks and retained permanent premolars similar to many gomphotheres, while modern elephantids lack permanent premolars, with the lower jaw being shortened (brevirostrine) and lower tusks being absent.

Comparison of teeth
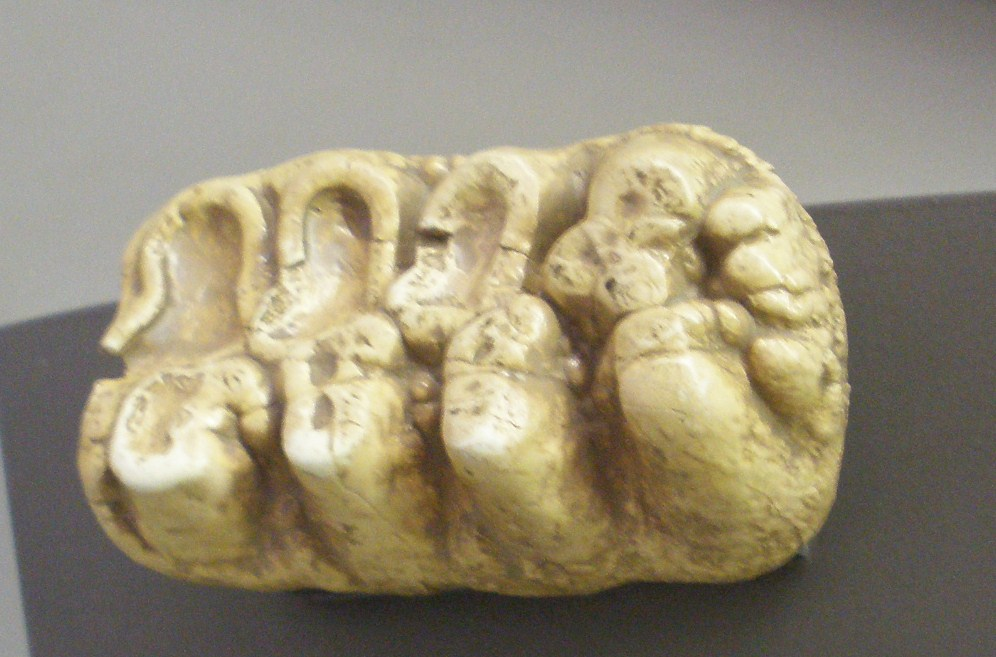
Worn molar of Stegotetrabelodon, a primitive elephantid

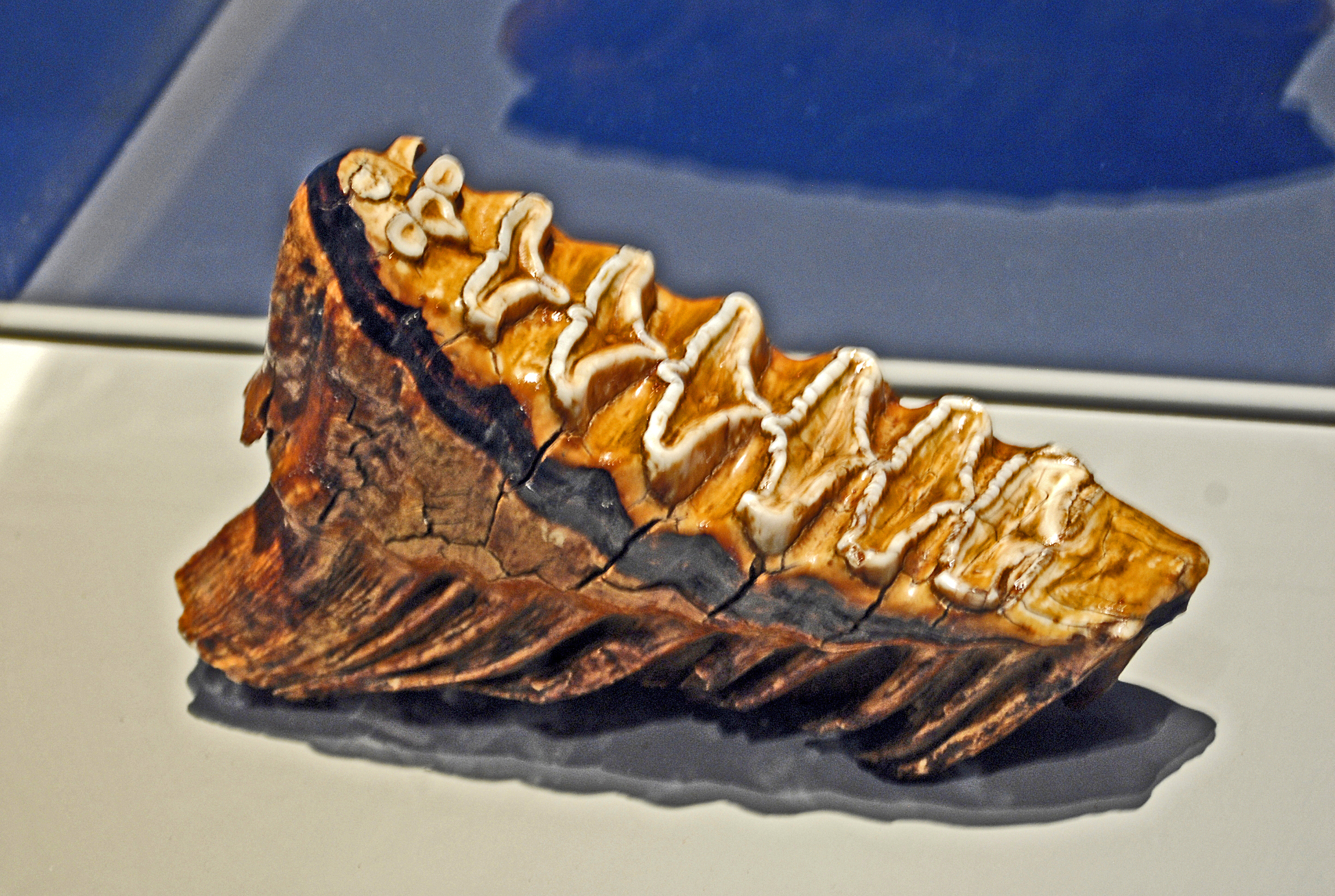
Molar of a modern African bush elephant (Loxodonta africana)

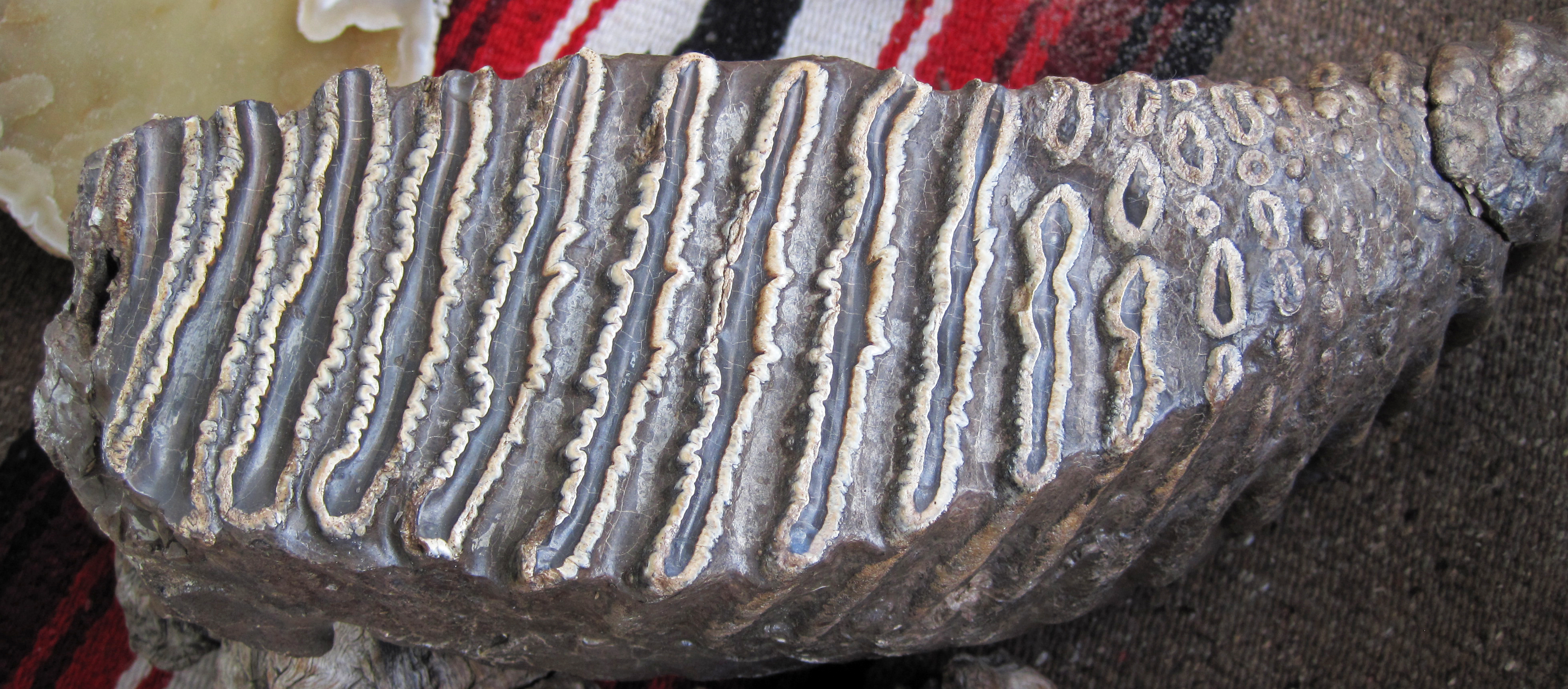
Tooth of Mammuthus sp.

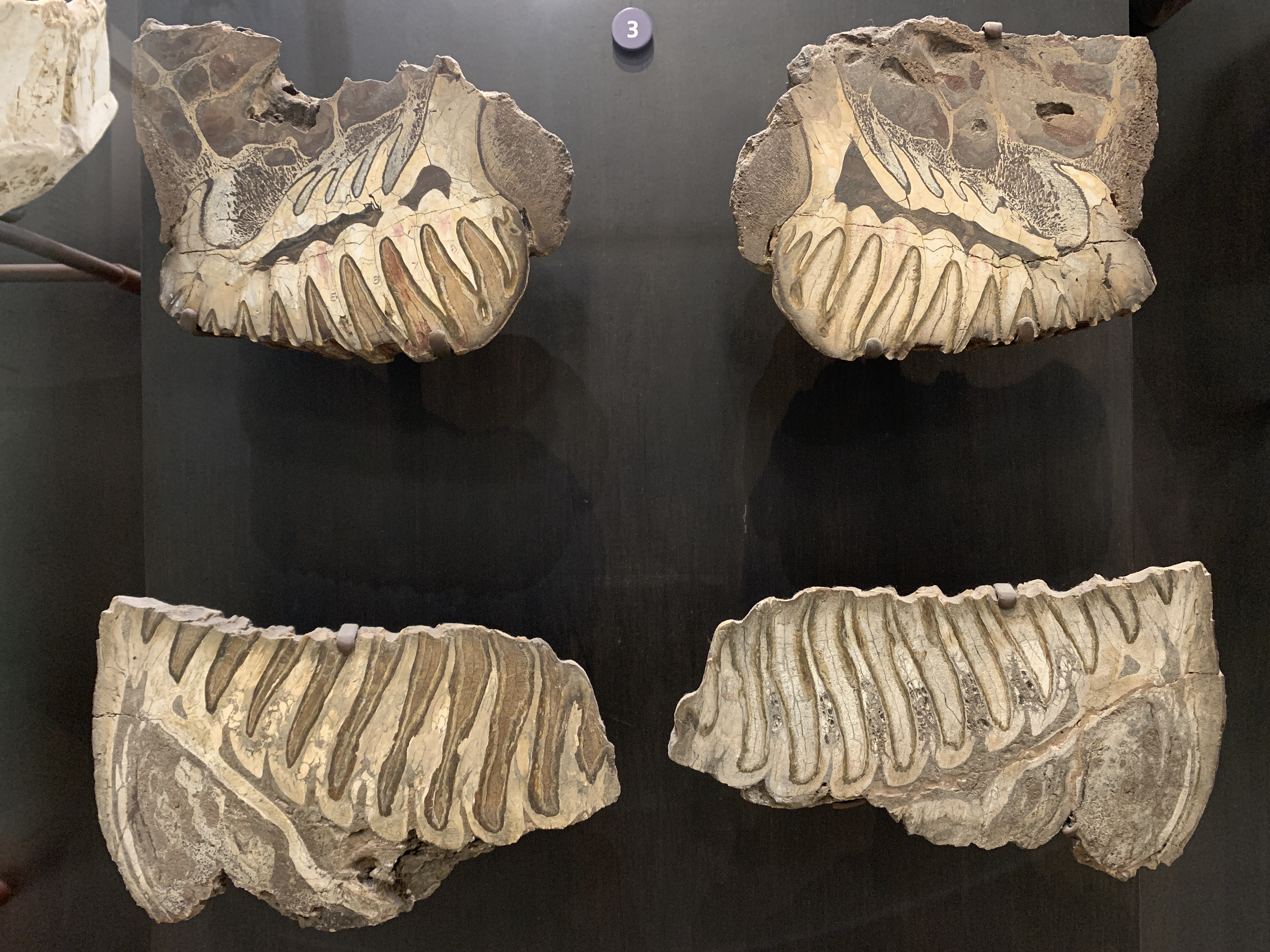
Cross section through elephantid molars

Diagram of the anatomy of the upper surface of a worn African elephant (Loxodonta) molar

Cross section of an elephant molar along the long axis of the tooth

Elephantids are typically sexually dimorphic, with substantially larger males, with an accelerated growth rate over a longer period of time than females. Elephantidae contains some of the largest known proboscideans, with fully-grown males of some species of mammoths and Palaeoloxodon having average body masses of 11 tonnes (24,000 lb) and 13 tonnes (29,000 lb) respectively, making them among the largest terrestrial mammals ever. One species of Palaeoloxodon, Palaeoloxodon namadicus, has been suggested to have been possibly the largest land mammal of all time, though this remains speculative due to the fragmentary nature of known remains. In comparison to more basal elephantimorphs like gomphotheres, the bodies of elephantids tend to be proportionally shorter from front to back, as well having more elongate limbs with more slender limb bones.

Gallery of elephantid skeletons
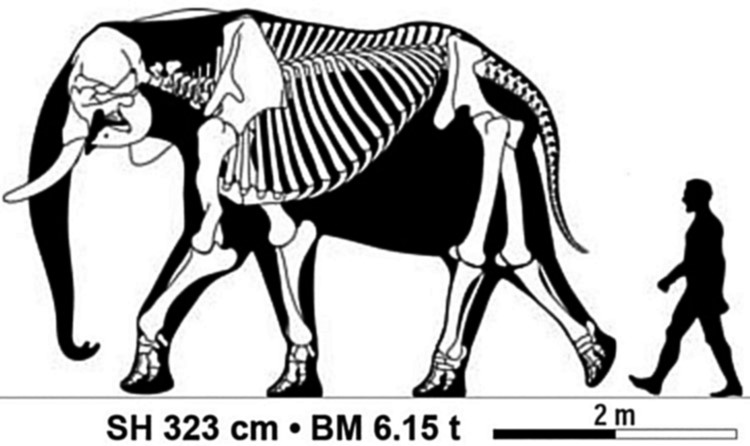
Skeleton of an African bush elephant (Loxodonta africana) bull

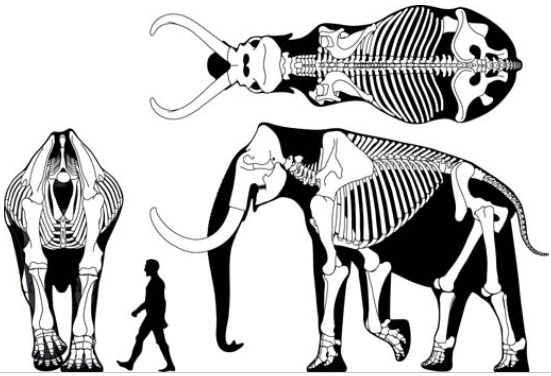
Skeleton of a steppe mammoth (Mammuthus trogontherii) in front-on (without head) side-on and top-down views

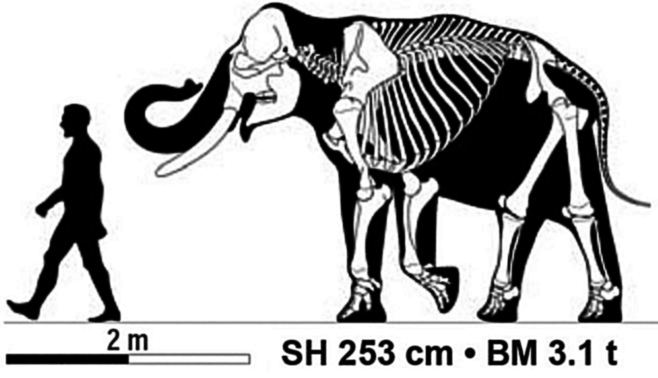
Skeleton of an Asian elephant (Elephas maximus)

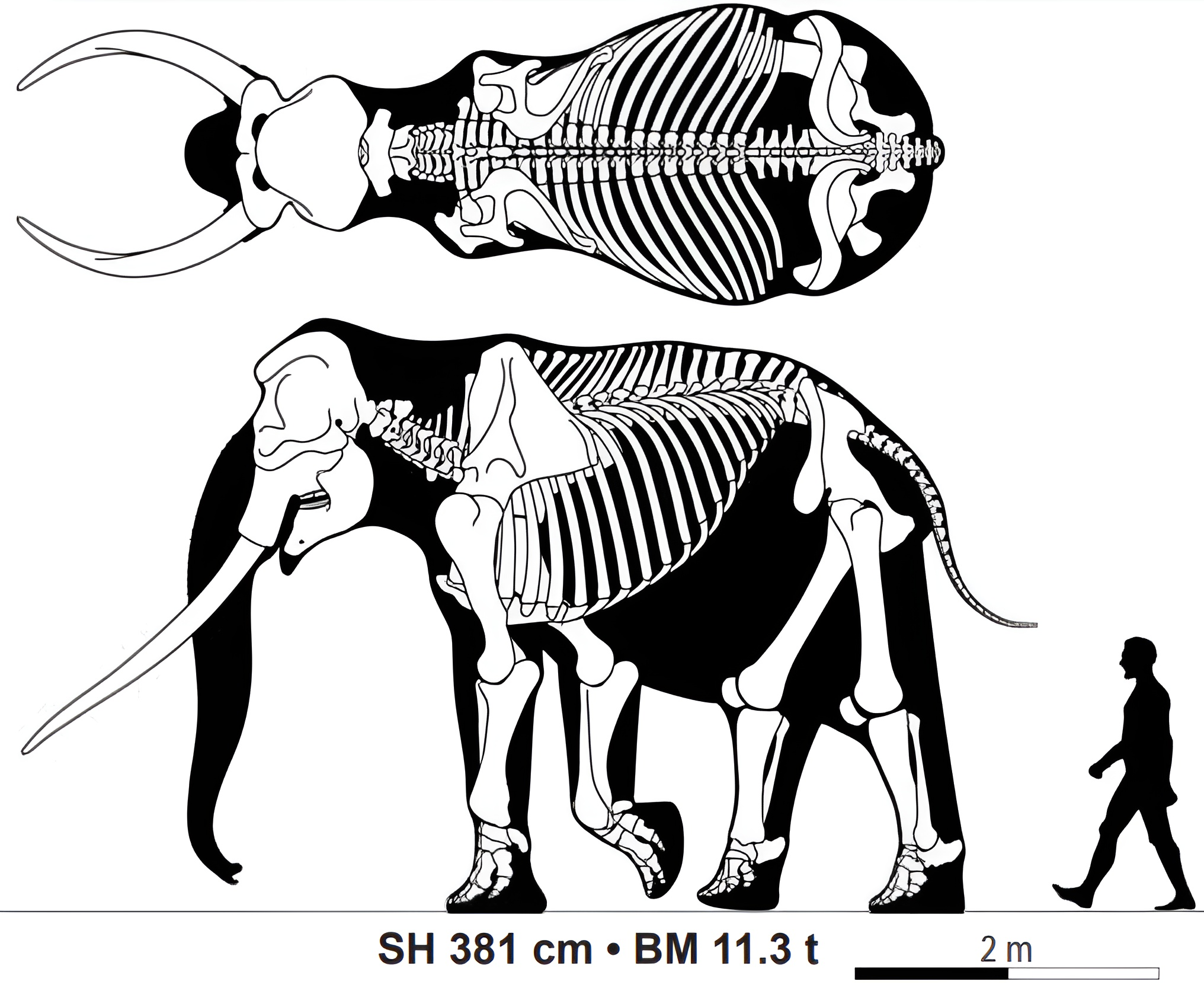
Skeleton of a straight-tusked elephant (Palaeoloxodon antiquus) bull

Size comparison of Palaeoloxodon falconeri, a dwarf elephant species from Sicily and one of the smallest elephantids known

== Ecology ==
Living female and juvenile elephants live in matriarchal (female-led) herds of related individuals, with males leaving these groups to live solitarily or in loose male bonding groups upon reaching adolescence around 14–15 years of age. Evidence has been found that extinct elephantids, including the most primitive elephantid, Stegotetrabelodon, also lived in herds based on footprint tracks. From around the age of 20, adult male elephants peridiodically enter a state of heightened aggression known as musth, where stronger males assert dominance over weaker males, on rare occasions breaking out into fights between rival males. Analysis of testosterone levels in woolly mammoth (Mammuthus primigenius) tusks indicates that they also went into musth, and healed wounds to some straight-tusked elephant (Palaeoloxodon antiquus) skeletons may have been the result of fighting between rival males. The earliest elephantid, Stegotetrabelodon, was a mixed feeder to a grazer based on dental mesowear analysis. Modern elephants are browsers to mixed feeders. Some extinct elephantids, like Palaeoloxodon recki and the woolly mammoth, were dedicated grazers.

== Classification ==
Phylogeny of recent and Late Pleistocene elephantid species, including Palaeoloxodon and mammoths, showing cross species hybridisation resulting in introgressive gene flow from African forest elephants into Palaeoloxodon, after Palkopoulou et al. 2018

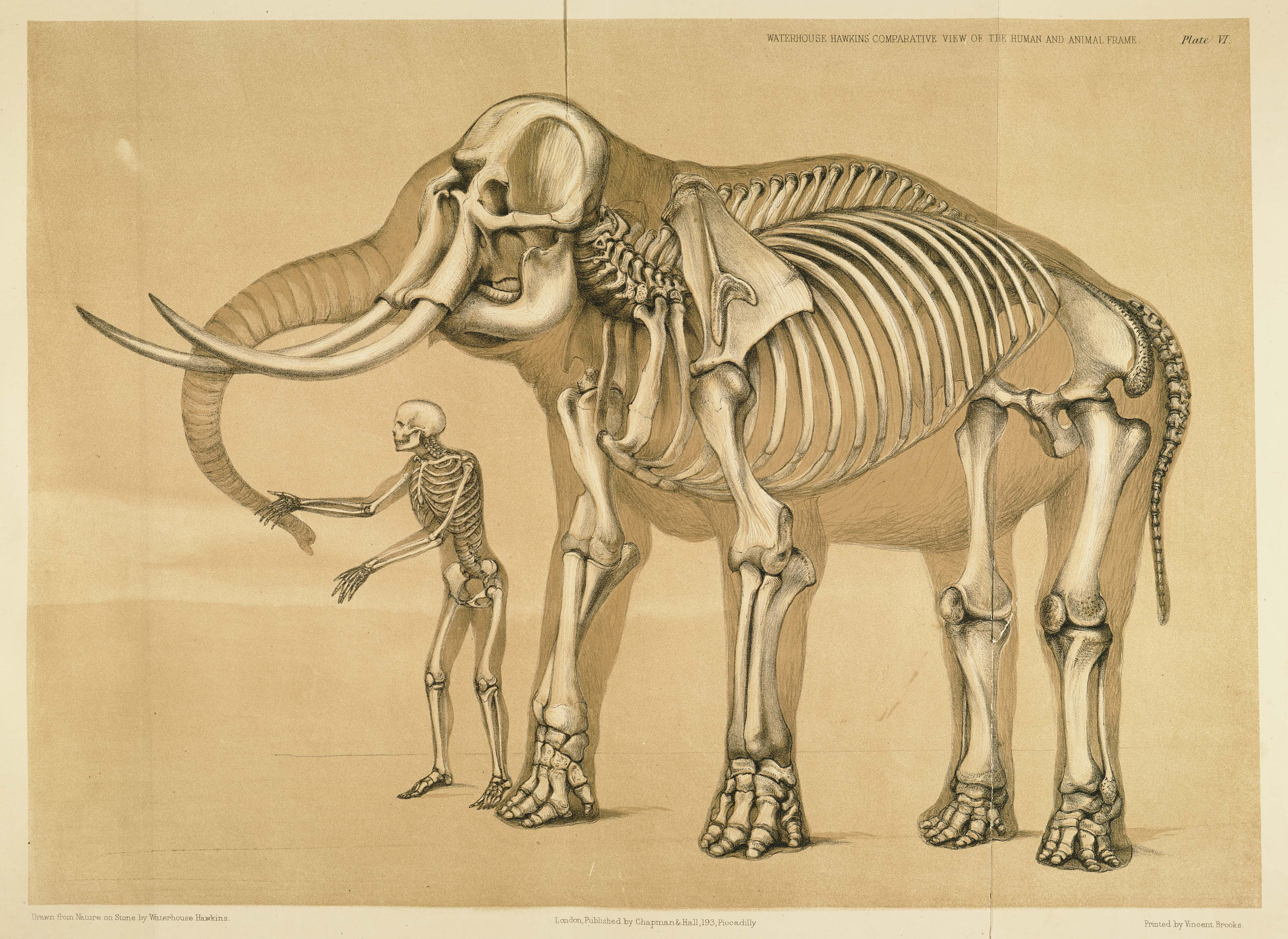
"Man, and the elephant" plate from Hawkins's A comparative view of the human and animal frame, 1860

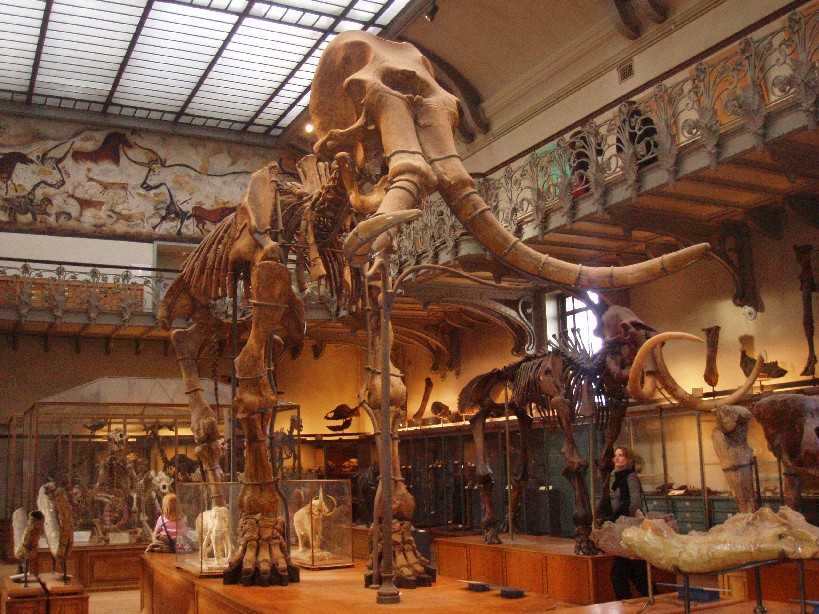
Skeleton of Mammuthus meridionalis at the French Museum of Natural History

Some authors have suggested to classify the family into two subfamilies, Stegotetrabelodontinae, which is monotypic, only containing Stegotetrabelodon, and Elephantinae, containing all other elephantids. Recent genetic research has indicated that Elephas and Mammuthus are more closely related to each other than to Loxodonta, with Palaeoloxodon closely related to Loxodonta. Palaeoloxodon also appears to have received extensive hybridisation with the African forest elephant, and to a lesser extent with mammoths.

=== Living species ===
- Loxodonta (African)
  - L. africana African bush elephant
  - L. cyclotis African forest elephant
- Elephas (Asiatic)
  - E. maximus Asian elephant
    - E. m. maximus Sri Lankan elephant
    - E. m. indicus Indian elephant
    - E. m. sumatranus Sumatran elephant
    - E. m. borneensis Borneo elephant

=== Classification ===
- Elephantidae
  - Subfamily Stegotetrabelodontinae
    - †Stegotetrabelodon (4 species)
  - Subfamily Elephantinae
    - †Primelephas (2 species)
    - Elephas (7+ species)
    - †Stegoloxodon (2 species)
    - Loxodonta (6 species)
    - †Palaeoloxodon (14+ species)
    - †Phanagoroloxodon (1 species)
    - †Mammuthus (10 species)
    - †Stegodibelodon (1 species)
    - †Selenetherium (1 species)

== Evolutionary history ==
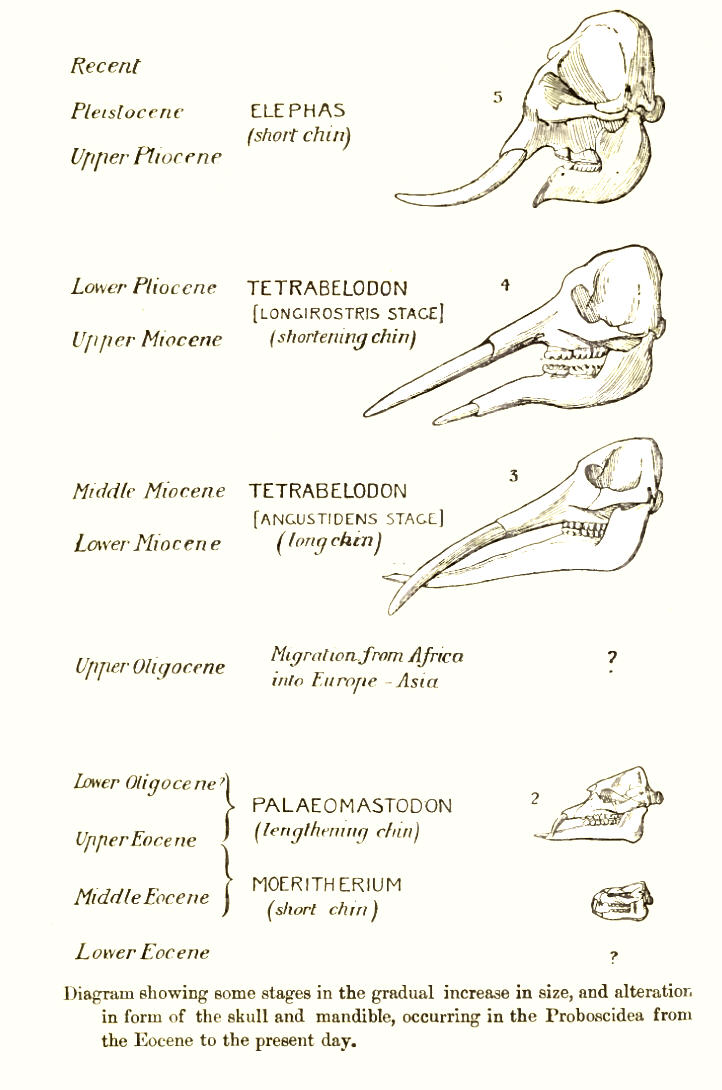
Evolution of elephantids from the ancient Eocene (bottom) to the modern day (top)

During the Late Miocene, around 10-8 million years ago, the earliest members of the family Elephantidae emerged in Afro-Arabia, having originated from gomphotheres, most likely from members of the genus Tetralophodon. The earliest members of the modern genera of Elephantidae appeared during the latest Miocene–early Pliocene around 6-5 million years ago. The elephantid genera Elephas (which includes the living Asian elephant) and Mammuthus (mammoths) migrated out of Africa during the late Pliocene, around 3.6 to 3.2 million years ago. Mammoths then migrated into North America around 1.5 million years ago. At the end of the Early Pleistocene, around 800,000 years ago the elephantid genus Palaeoloxodon dispersed outside of Africa, becoming widely distributed in Eurasia. Palaeoloxodon became extinct as part of the Late Pleistocene extinctions, with mammoths only surviving in relict populations on islands around the Bering Strait into the Holocene, with their latest survival being on Wrangel Island, where they persisted until around 4,000 years ago.

== See also ==
- Deinotherium
- Embrithopoda
- Eritherium azzouzorum
- Palaeoloxodon namadicus
- Zygolophodon
