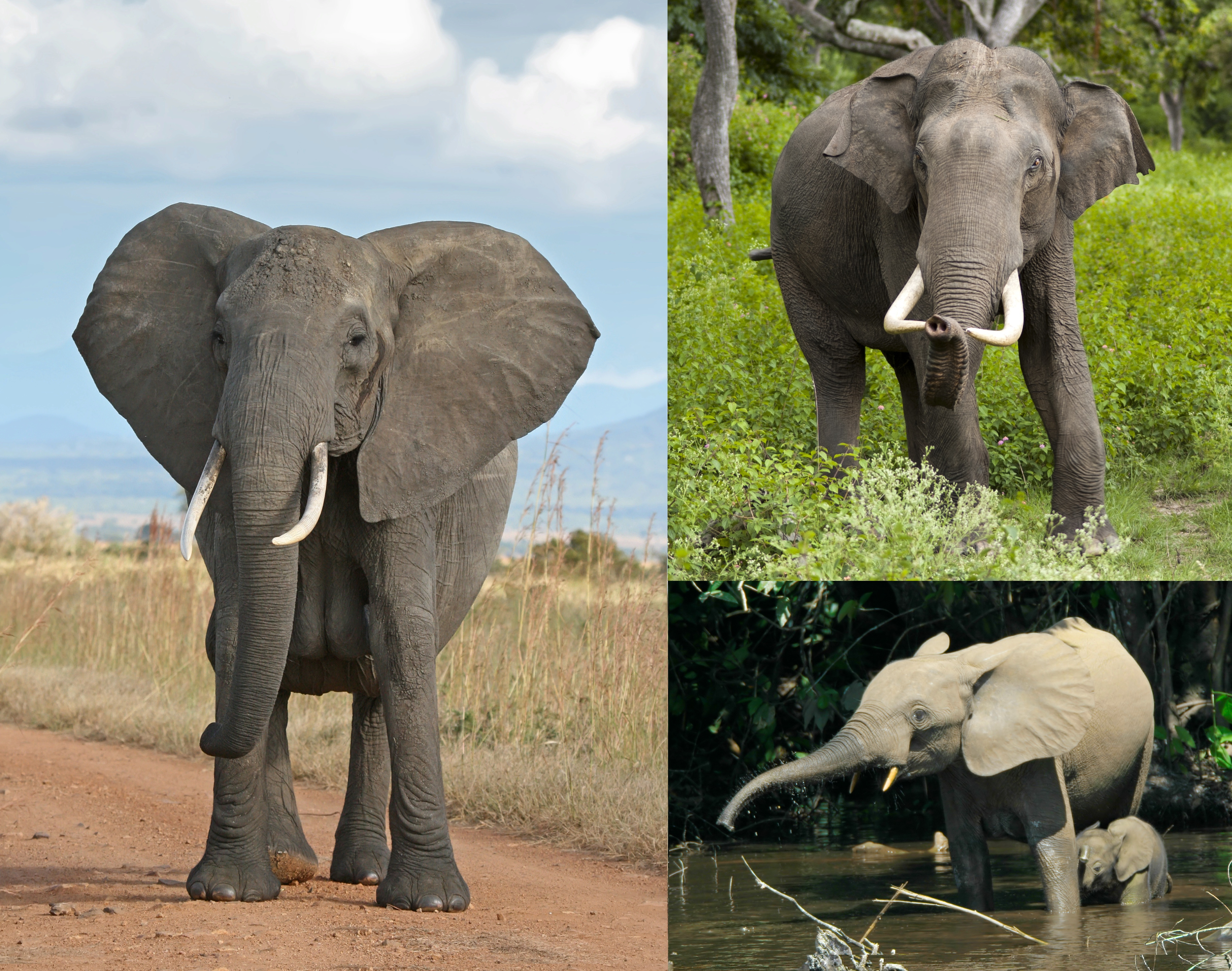
- The three living elephant species: Asian elephant, Elephas maximus (top right), African bush elephant, Loxodonta africana (left) and African forest elephant, Loxodonta cyclotis (bottom right)
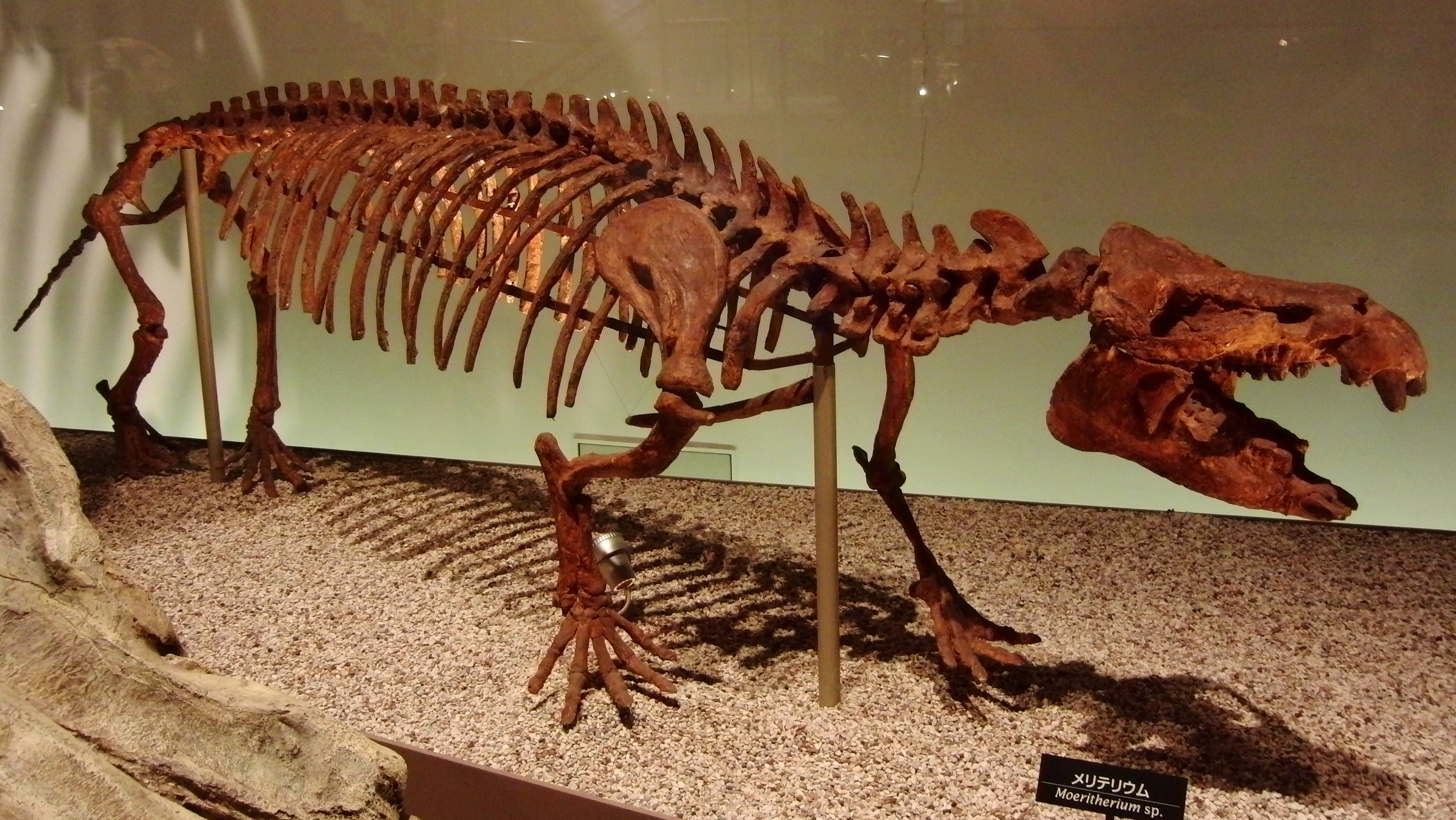
- Skeleton of the early proboscidean Moeritherium

Scientific classification
- Kingdom: Animalia
- Phylum: Chordata
- Class: Mammalia
- Mirorder: Tethytheria
- Order: Proboscidea; Illiger, 1811

Subclades
- †Arcanotherium; †Barytherium; †Daouitherium; †Eritherium; †Khamsaconus; †Moeritherium; †Numidotherium; †Omanitherium; †Phosphatherium; †Saloumia; †Deinotheriidae; Elephantiformes

= Proboscidea =

Proboscidea Temporal range: Middle Paleocene-Holocene 60.0–0 Ma

Order of mammals including elephants

Proboscidea (/ˌproʊbəˈsɪdiə/; from Latin proboscis, from Ancient Greek προβοσκίς (proboskís) 'elephant's trunk') is a taxonomic order of Afrothere paenungulate mammals described by J. Illiger in 1811. It encompasses the elephants (family Elephantidae) and their extinct relatives. Three living species of elephant are currently recognised: the African bush elephant, the African forest elephant, and the Asian elephant.

Extinct members of Proboscidea include the deinotheres, mastodons, gomphotheres, amebelodonts and stegodonts. The family Elephantidae also contains several extinct groups, including mammoths and Palaeoloxodon. Proboscideans include some of the largest known land mammals, with the elephant Palaeoloxodon namadicus and mastodon "Mammut" borsoni suggested to have body masses surpassing 16 tonnes (35,000 lb), rivalling or exceeding paraceratheres, the otherwise largest known land mammals in size. The largest living proboscidean is the African bush elephant, with a recorded maximum size of 4 meters (13.1 feet) at the shoulder and a weight of 10.4 tonnes (11.5 short tons). In addition to their enormous size, later proboscideans are distinguished by tusks and long, muscular trunks, which were less developed or absent in early proboscideans.

== Evolution ==
Over 180 extinct members of Proboscidea have been described. The earliest members of Proboscidea like Eritherium are known from the Paleocene of Africa, around 60 million years ago, the earliest proboscideans were much smaller than living elephants, with Eritherium having a body mass of around 3–8 kilograms (6.6–17.6 lb). By the late Eocene, some members of Proboscidea like Barytherium had reached considerable size, with an estimated mass of around 2 tonnes, while others like Moeritherium are suggested to have been semi-aquatic.

A major event in proboscidean evolution was the collision of Afro-Arabia with Eurasia, during the Early Miocene, around 18-19 million years ago allowing proboscideans to disperse from their African homeland across Eurasia, and later, around 16-15 million years ago into North America across the Bering Land Bridge. Proboscidean groups prominent during the Miocene include the deinotheres, along with the more advanced elephantimorphs, including mammutids (mastodons), gomphotheres, amebelodontids (which includes the "shovel tuskers" like Platybelodon), choerolophodontids and stegodontids. Around 10 million years ago, the earliest members of the family Elephantidae emerged in Africa, having originated from gomphotheres. The Late Miocene saw major climatic changes, which resulted in the decline and extinction of many proboscidean groups such as amebelodontids and choerolophodontids. The earliest members of modern genera of Elephantidae appeared during the latest Miocene-early Pliocene around 6-5 million years ago. The elephantid genera Elephas (which includes the living Asian elephant) and Mammuthus (mammoths) migrated out of Africa during the late Pliocene, around 3.6 to 3.2 million years ago.

Over the course of the Early Pleistocene, all non-elephantid probobscideans outside of the Americas became extinct (including mammutids, gomphotheres and deinotheres), with the exception of Stegodon. Gomphotheres dispersed into South America during this era as part of the Great American interchange, and mammoths migrating into North America around 1.5 million years ago. At the end of the Early Pleistocene, around 800,000 years ago the elephantid genus Palaeoloxodon dispersed outside of Africa, becoming widely distributed in Eurasia. By the beginning of the Late Pleistocene, proboscideans were represented by around 23 species. Proboscideans underwent a dramatic decline during the Late Pleistocene as part of the Late Pleistocene megafauna extinctions, with all remaining non-elephantid proboscideans (including Stegodon, mastodons, and the American gomphotheres Cuvieronius and Notiomastodon) and Palaeoloxodon becoming extinct, with mammoths only surviving in relict populations on islands around the Bering Strait into the Holocene, with their latest survival being on Wrangel Island around 4,000 years ago.

The following cladogram is based on endocasts.

- Proboscidea
  - Phosphatherium esculliei
  - - Numidotherium koholense
    - - Moeritherium lyonsi
      - - Deinotheriidae
        - Elephantiformes
          - Palaeomastodon beadnelli
          - Elephantimorpha
            - - Mammutida
                - Mammut americanum
                - Zygolophodon borsoni
            - - Choerolophodon pentelici
              - - Gomphotherium augustidens
                - - Cuvieronius andium
                  - Stegomastodon humboldti
                  - Elephantoidea
                    - Stegodon insignis
                    - Elephantidae
                      - - - Mammuthus meridionalis
                          - Mammuthus primigenius
                          - Mammuthus columbi
                        - Elephas maximus
                      - Loxodonta africana
                      - Palaeoloxodon
                        - Palaeoloxodon antiquus
                        - Palaeoloxodon falconeri

== Morphology ==
Gallery of Proboscidean skeletons
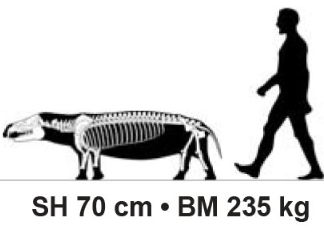
Skeleton of the primitive proboscidean Moeritherium lyonsi

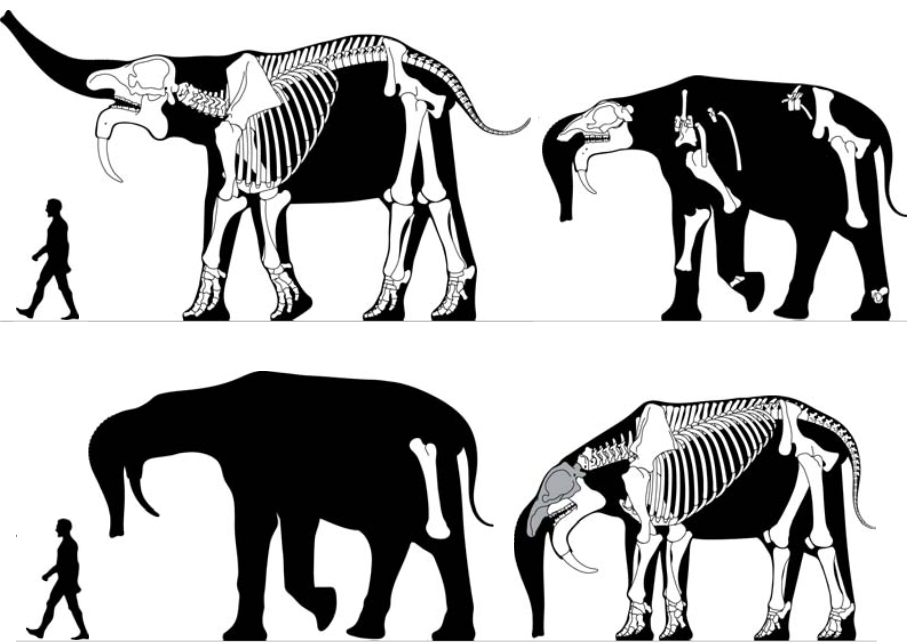
Skeletons of Deinotherium (Deinotheriidae)

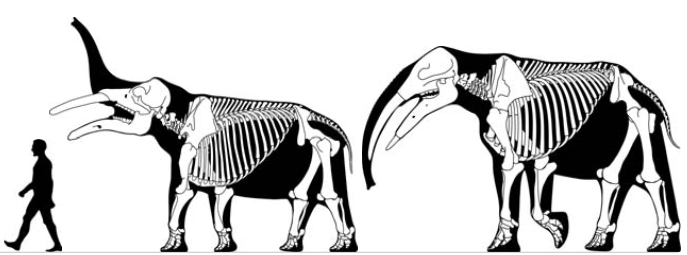
Skeletons of two species of the gomphothere Gomphotherium

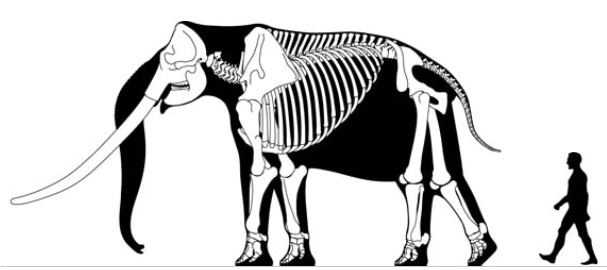
Skeleton of Stegodon zdanskyi (Stegodontidae)

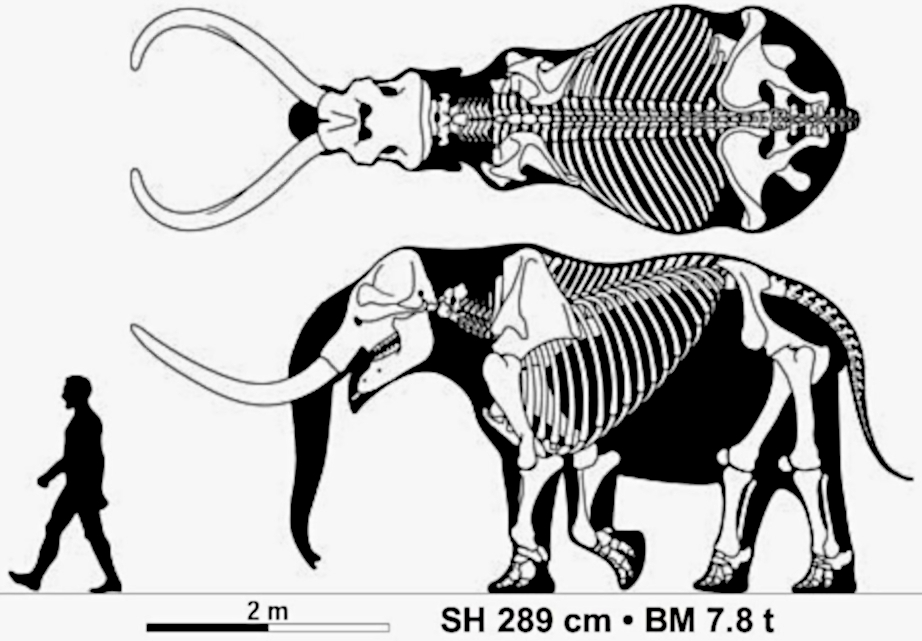
Skeleton of the American mastodon, Mammut americanum (Mammutidae)

Over the course of their evolution, proboscideans experienced a significant increase in body size. Some members of the families Deinotheriidae, Mammutidae, Stegodontidae and Elephantidae are thought to have exceeded modern elephants in size, with shoulder heights over 4 metres (13 ft) and masses over 10 tonnes (22,000 lb), with average fully grown males of the mammutid "Mammut" borsoni having an estimated body mass of 16 tonnes (35,000 lb), making it one the largest and perhaps the largest land mammal ever, with a fragmentary specimen of the Indian elephant species Palaeoloxodon namadicus only known from a partial femur being speculatively estimated in the same study to have possibly reached a body mass of 22 tonnes (49,000 lb). As with other megaherbivores, including the extinct sauropod dinosaurs, the large size of proboscideans likely developed to allow them to survive on vegetation with low nutritional value. Their limbs grew longer and the feet shorter and broader. The feet were originally plantigrade and developed into a digitigrade stance with cushion pads and the sesamoid bone providing support, with this change developing around the common ancestor of Deinotheriidae and Elephantiformes. Members of Elephantiformes and Deinotheriidae have retracted nasal regions of the skull indicating the development of a trunk.

The skull grew larger, especially the cranium, while the neck shortened to provide better support for the skull. The increase in size led to the development and elongation of the mobile trunk to provide reach. The number of premolars, incisors and canines decreased. The cheek teeth (molars and premolars) became larger and more specialised. In Elephantiformes, the second upper incisor and lower incisor were transformed into ever growing tusks on the upper and lower jaws, while in Deinotheriidae there are only tusks on the lower jaw. The tusks are proportionally heavy for their size, being primarily composed of dentine. In primitive proboscideans, a band of enamel covers part of the tusk surface, though in many later groups including modern elephants the band is lost, with elephants only having enamel on the tusk tips of juveniles. The upper tusks were initially modest in size, but from the Late Miocene onwards proboscideans developed increasingly large tusks, with the longest ever recorded tusk being 5.02 metres (16.5 ft) long belonging to the mammutid "Mammut" borsoni found in Greece, with some mammoth tusks likely weighing over 200 kilograms (440 lb). The lower tusks are generally smaller than the upper tusks, but could grow to large sizes in some species, like in Deinotherium (which lacks upper tusks), where they could grow over 1.5 metres (4.9 ft) long, the amebelodontid Konobelodon has lower tusks 1.61 metres (5.3 ft) long, with the longest lower tusks ever recorded being from the primitive elephantid Stegotetrabelodon which are around 2.2 metres (7.2 ft) long.

The molar teeth changed from being replaced vertically as in other mammals to being replaced horizontally in the clade Elephantimorpha. While early Elephantimorpha generally had lower jaws with an elongated mandibular symphysis at the front of the jaw with well developed lower tusks/incisors, from the Late Miocene onwards, many groups convergently developed brevirostrine (shortened) lower jaws with vestigial or no lower tusks. Elephantids are distinguished from other proboscideans by a major shift in the molar morphology to parallel lophs rather than the cusps of earlier proboscideans, allowing them to become higher crowned (hypsodont) and more efficient in consuming grass.

=== Dwarfism ===
Size comparison of the dwarf elephant Palaeoloxodon falconeri from the Pleistocene of Sicily and Malta to a human

Several species of proboscideans lived on islands and experienced insular dwarfism. This occurred primarily during the Pleistocene, when some elephant populations became isolated by fluctuating sea levels, although dwarf elephants did exist earlier in the Pliocene. These elephants likely grew smaller on islands due to a lack of large or viable predator populations and limited resources. By contrast, small mammals such as rodents develop gigantism in these conditions. Dwarf proboscideans are known to have lived in Indonesia, the Channel Islands of California, and several islands of the Mediterranean.

Elephas celebensis of Sulawesi is believed to have descended from Elephas planifrons. Elephas falconeri of Malta and Sicily was only 1 m (3 ft), and had probably evolved from the straight-tusked elephant. Other descendants of the straight-tusked elephant existed in Cyprus. Dwarf elephants of uncertain descent lived in Crete, Cyclades and Dodecanese, while dwarf mammoths are known to have lived in Sardinia. The Columbian mammoth colonised the Channel Islands and evolved into the pygmy mammoth. This species reached a height of 1.2–1.8 m (4–6 ft) and weighed 200–2,000 kg (440–4,410 lb). A population of small woolly mammoths survived on Wrangel Island as recently as 4,000 years ago. After their discovery in 1993, they were considered dwarf mammoths. This classification has been re-evaluated and since the Second International Mammoth Conference in 1999, these animals are no longer considered to be true "dwarf mammoths".

== Ecology ==
It has been suggested that members of Elephantimorpha, including mammutids, gomphotheres, and stegodontids, lived in herds like modern elephants. Analysis of remains of the American mastodon (Mammut americanum) suggest that like modern elephants, that herds consisted of females and juveniles and that adult males lived solitarily or in small groups, and that adult males periodically engaged in fights with other males during periods similar to musth found in living elephants. These traits are suggested to be inherited from the last common ancestor of elephantimorphs, with musth-like behaviour also suggested to have occurred in gomphotheres. All elephantimorphs are suggested to have been capable of communication via infrasound, as found in living elephants. Deinotheres may have also lived in herds, based on tracks found in the Late Miocene of Romania. Over the course of the Neogene and Pleistocene, various members of Elephantida shifted from a browse-dominated diet towards mixed feeding or grazing.

== Classification ==
Below is a taxonomy of proboscidean genera as of 2019.

- Order Proboscidea Illiger, 1811
  - †Eritherium Gheerbrant, 2009
  - †Moeritherium Andrews, 1901
  - †Saloumia Tabuce et al., 2019
  - †Family Numidotheriidae Shoshani & Tassy, 1992
    - †Phosphatherium Gheerbrant et al., 1996
    - †Arcanotherium Delmer, 2009
    - †Daouitherium Gheerbrant & Sudre, 2002
    - †Numidotherium Mahboubi et al., 1986
  - †Family Barytheriidae Andrews, 1906
    - †Omanitherium Seiffert et al., 2012
    - †Barytherium Andrews, 1901
  - †Family Deinotheriidae Bonaparte, 1845
    - †Chilgatherium Sanders et al., 2004
    - †Prodeinotherium Ehik, 1930
    - †Deinotherium Kaup, 1829
  - Suborder Elephantiformes Tassy, 1988
    - †Eritreum Shoshani et al., 2006
    - †Hemimastodon Pilgrim, 1912
    - †Palaeomastodon Andrews, 1901
    - †Phiomia Andrews & Beadnell, 1902
    - Infraorder Elephantimorpha Tassy & Shoshani, 1997
      - †Family Mammutidae Hay, 1922
        - †Losodokodon Rasmussen & Gutierrez, 2009
        - †Eozygodon Tassy & Pickford, 1983
        - †Zygolophodon Vacek, 1877
        - †Sinomammut Mothé et al., 2016
        - †Mammut Blumenbach, 1799
      - Parvorder Elephantida Tassy & Shoshani, 1997
        - †Family Choerolophodontidae Gaziry, 1976
          - †Afrochoerodon Pickford, 2001
          - †Choerolophodon Schlesinger, 1917
        - †Family Amebelodontidae Barbour, 1927
          - †Afromastodon Pickford, 2003
          - †Progomphotherium Pickford, 2003
          - †Eurybelodon Lambert, 2016
          - †Serbelodon Frick, 1933
          - †Archaeobelodon Tassy, 1984
          - †Protanancus Arambourg, 1945
          - †Amebelodon Barbour, 1927
          - †Konobelodon Lambert, 1990
          - †Torynobelodon Barbour, 1929
          - †Aphanobelodon Wang et al., 2016
          - †Platybelodon Borissiak, 1928
        - †Family Gomphotheriidae Hay, 1922 (paraphyletic)
            - †Gomphotherium Burmeister, 1837
            - †Blancotherium May, 2019
            - †Gnathabelodon Barbour & Sternberg, 1935
            - †Eubelodon Barbour, 1914
            - †Megabelodon Barbour, 1914
            - †Stegomastodon Pohlig, 1912
            - †Sinomastodon Tobien et al., 1986
            - †Notiomastodon Cabrera, 1929
            - †Rhynchotherium Falconer, 1868
            - †Cuvieronius Osborn, 1923
        - Superfamily Elephantoidea Gray, 1821
            - "tetralophodont gomphotheres"
              - †Anancus Aymard, 1855
              - †Paratetralophodon Tassy, 1983
              - †Pediolophodon Lambert, 2007
              - †Tetralophodon Falconer, 1857
          - †Family Stegodontidae Osborn, 1918
            - †Stegolophodon Schlesinger, 1917
            - †Stegodon Falconer, 1857
          - Family Elephantidae Gray, 1821
            - †Stegodibelodon Coppens, 1972
            - †Stegotetrabelodon Petrocchi, 1941
            - †Selenotherium Mackaye, Brunet & Tassy, 2005
            - †Primelephas Maglio, 1970
            - Loxodonta Anonymous, 1827
            - †Palaeoloxodon Matsumoto, 1924
            - †Mammuthus Brookes, 1828
            - Elephas Linnaeus, 1758

== Bibliography ==
- Nowak, Ronald M. (1999), Walker's Mammals of the World (6th ed.), Baltimore: Johns Hopkins University Press, ISBN 978-0-8018-5789-8, LCCN 98023686
- Haynes, Gary (1993), Mammoths, Mastodonts, and Elephants: Biology, Behavior and the Fossil Record (2nd ed.), Cambridge University Press, ISBN 978-0-521-45691-3
- Sukumar, R. (11 September 2003). The Living Elephants: Evolutionary Ecology, Behaviour, and Conservation. Oxford University Press, USA. ISBN 978-0-19-510778-4. OCLC 935260783.
