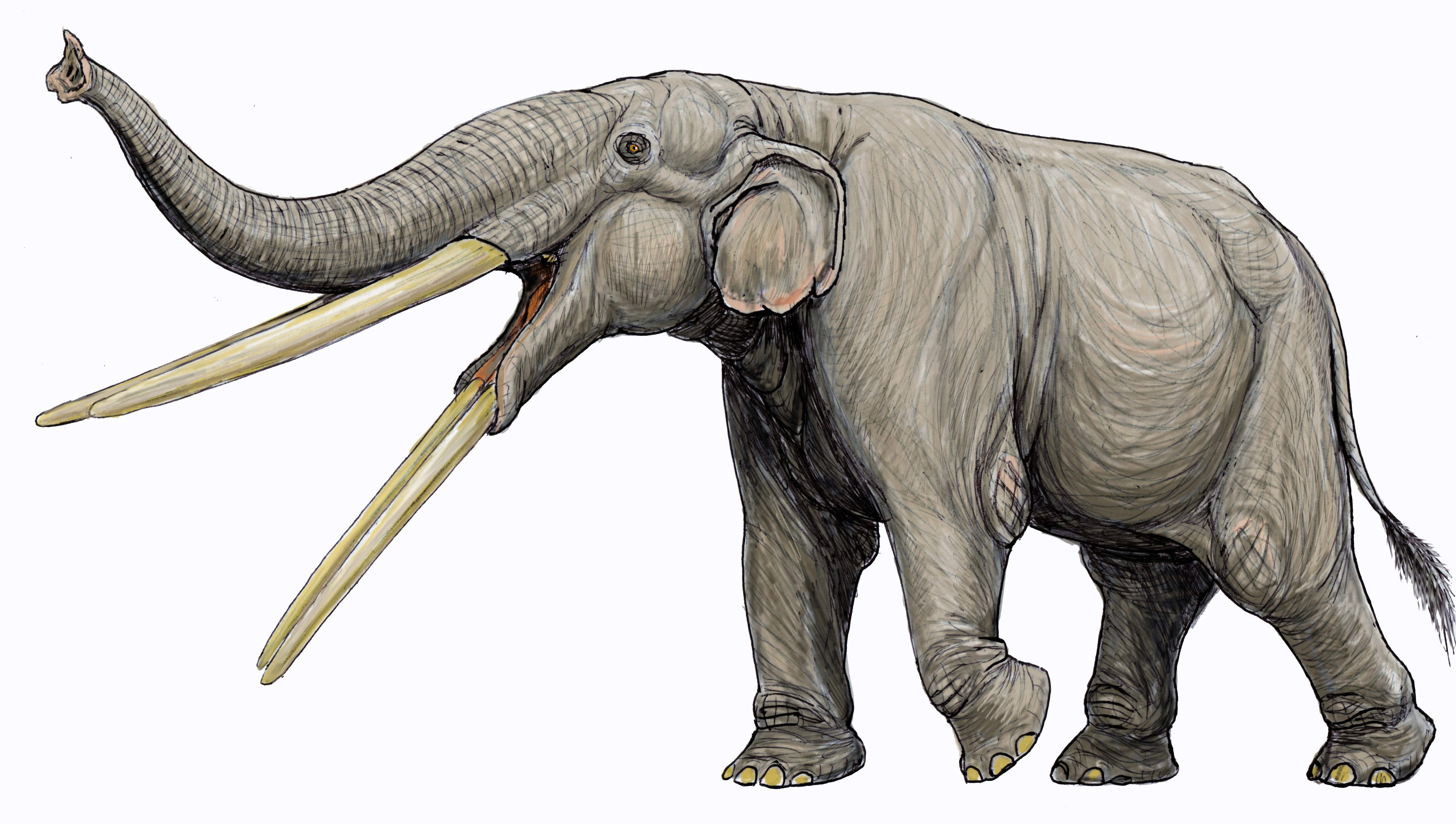
- Restoration of Stegotetrabelodon syrticus
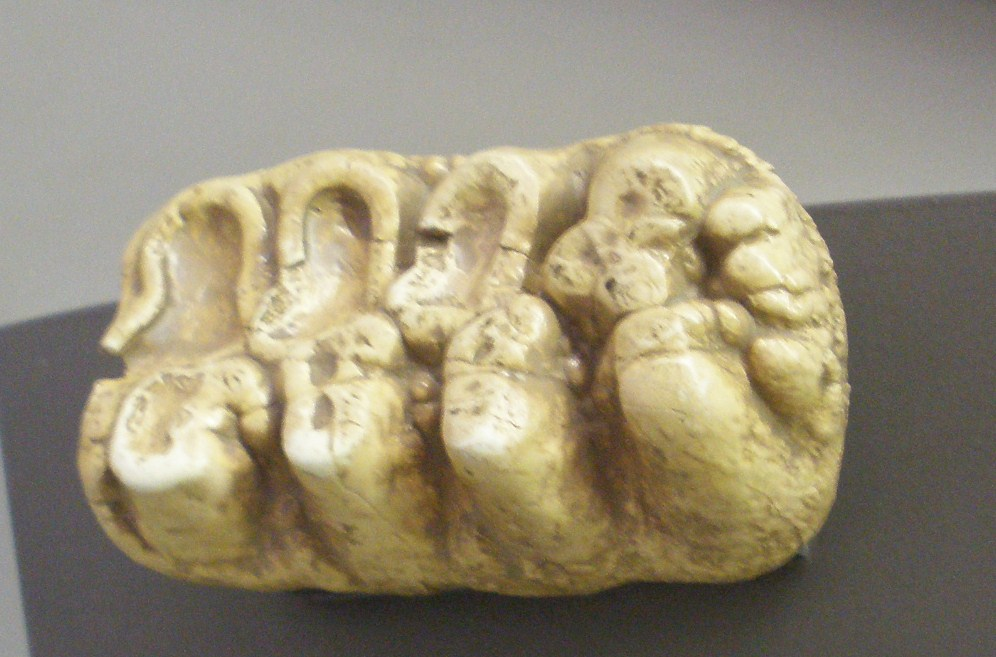
- Stegotetrabelodon molar tooth

Scientific classification
- Kingdom: Animalia
- Phylum: Chordata
- Class: Mammalia
- Infraclass: Placentalia
- Order: Proboscidea
- Family: Elephantidae
- Genus: †Stegotetrabelodon; Petrocchi, 1941

Type species
- † Stegotetrabelodon syrticus Petrocchi, 1941

Species
- S. syrticus Petrocchi, 1941; S. orbus Maglio, 1970; S. lybicus Petrocchi, 1943; S. emiratus Sanders, 2022

= Stegotetrabelodon =

Stegotetrabelodon Temporal range: Late Miocene to Early Pliocene, 8–4.2 Ma

Extinct genus of primitive elephantid

Stegotetrabelodon (from Ancient Greek στέγος (stégos), meaning "roof", τετρα- (tetra-), meaning "four", βέλος (bélos), meaning "arrow", and ὀδούς (odoús), meaning "tooth") is an extinct genus of primitive elephantids from the Late Miocene to Early Pliocene of Africa, the Arabian Peninsula, and Italy. It is the earliest and most primitive member of the family, notably retaining long lower tusks, which are the longest known of any proboscidean.

== Species and evolution ==
Stegotetrabelodon is suggested to have probably evolved from the "tetralophodont gomphothere" Tetralophodon. The earliest species S. emiratus is known from the Late Miocene Baynunah Formation of the United Arab Emirates on the Arabian Peninsula, dating to around 8-6 million years ago. S. orbus is known from the Late Miocene-Early Pliocene in East Africa (Kenya, Uganda), spanning from around 7.5 million years ago to possibly as late as 4.2 million years ago. The species S. syrticus is known from the Sahabi site in Libya, dating to around 6.8–5.3 million years ago, with remains of the species also reported from the Late Miocene of Calabria in southern Italy, which was likely part of Africa during this time.

"Stegotetrabelodon" maluvalensis from the Late Miocene of Pakistan is now placed in Stegolophodon, while "Stegatetrabelodon" gigantorostris from the Late Miocene of China is now placed in Tetralophodon.

== Description ==
An estimate based on the size of limb bones collected from Sahabi suggests S. syrticus may have reached 4 m (13 ft 1 in) in shoulder height and 11–12 t (24,000–26,000 lb) in weight, with a similar estimate of 3.7 m (12 ft 2 in) and 10–11 t (22,000–24,000 lb) made for S. emiratus. In comparison to later elephantids, Stegotetrabelodon has several primitive features, including the retention of permanent premolar teeth, an elongated mandibular symphysis and large lower tusks, shared with its gomphothere ancestors. The lower tusks are the longest known among proboscideans, reaching a length of 2.2 m (7 ft 3 in) in S. syrticus, though they weighed only around 12.5 kg (28 lb), with the upper tusks also being large, reaching a length of 2.8 m (9 ft 2 in) and weight exceeding 40 kg (88 lb) in S. syrticus.

== Ecology ==
In December 2006, a small contingent of Emirates Natural History Group members found several sets of proboscidean footprints thought to have probably been produced by Stegotetrabelodon preserved in a large calcareous exposure between the sand dunes of "Mleisa 1" in the Western Region of the Emirate of Abu Dhabi, the United Arab Emirates. The longest of these tracks extend for 290 m (950 ft) and 170 m (560 ft). These tracks suggest that like modern elephants, Stegotetrabelodon lived in herds.
