= African mammoth =

African mammoth may refer to:

- Mammuthus africanavus, a fossil species from northern Africa
- Mammuthus subplanifrons, a fossil species from southern Africa
