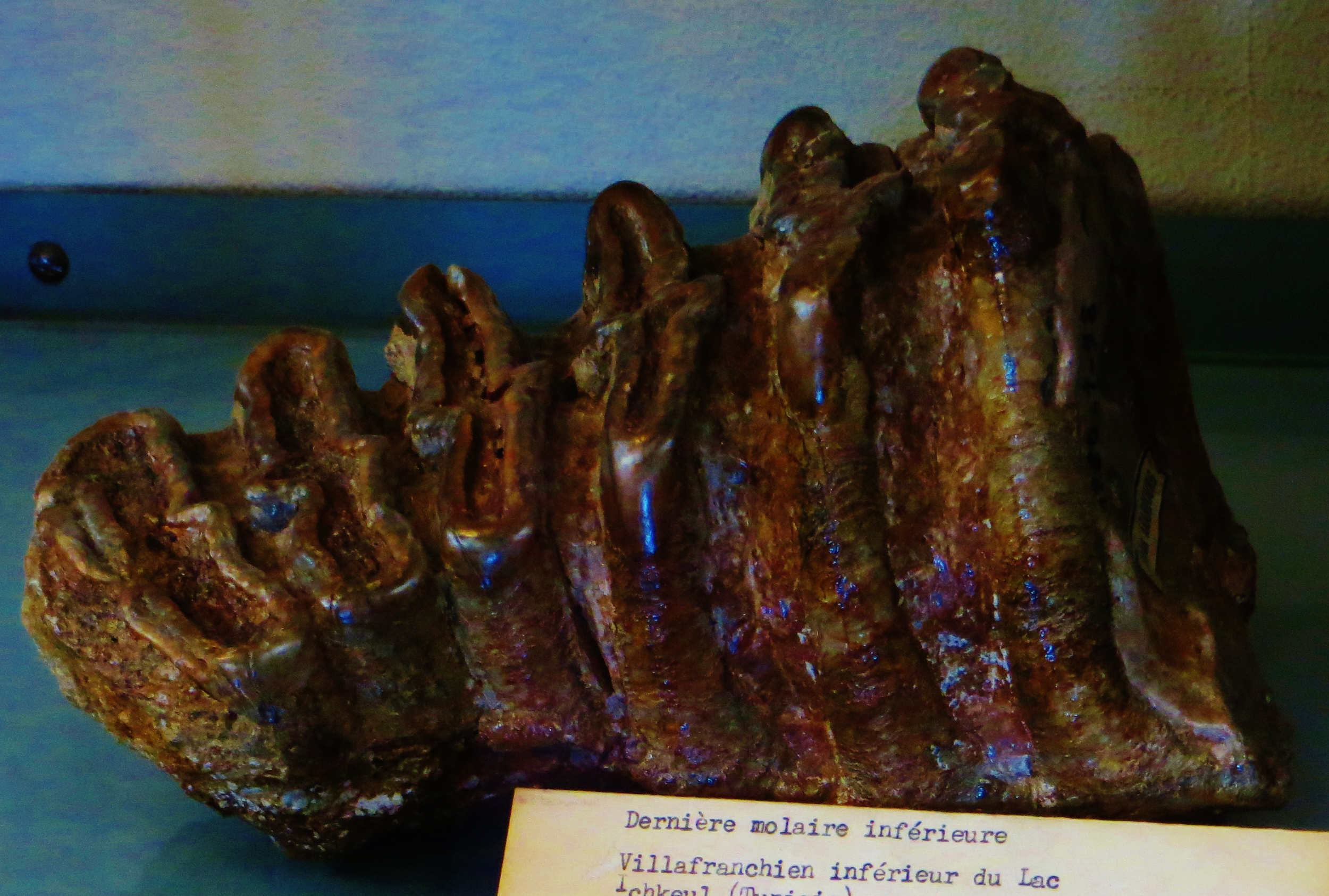
- Molar found in Tunisia

Scientific classification
- Kingdom: Animalia
- Phylum: Chordata
- Class: Mammalia
- Order: Proboscidea
- Family: Elephantidae
- Genus: †Mammuthus
- Species: †M. africanavus

Binomial name
- †Mammuthus africanavus (Arambourg, 1952)

Synonyms
- Elephas africanavus Arambourg, 1952

= Mammuthus africanavus =

Mammuthus africanavus Temporal range: Late Pliocene–Early Pleistocene

Species of mammoth known from northern and central Africa (fossil)

Mammuthus africanavus (literally, "African ancestor mammoth") is a species of mammoth known from Late Pliocene to Early Pleistocene deposits in Central and North Africa, including present-day Chad, Morocco, Tunisia and Algeria. It was originally described by Camille Arambourg in 1952 from remains discovered near Lake Ichkeul in northern Tunisia and was initially assigned to the genus Elephas (which contains the living Asian elephant). Some specimens from the original material may belong to Elephas rather than Mammuthus, although the holotype has been argued to represent a true mammoth. Other authors have proposed placing the species in Loxodonta (which contains living African elephants), reflecting the difficulty of distinguishing the teeth of early elephantids.

M. africanavus differs from the earlier Mammuthus subplanifrons in having numerous ridges or lamellae, on its molars, with approximately 9–10 present on the third molars. Its molars are also more hypsodont (high crowned), with greater amounts of cementum, thinner enamel, and more closely spaced molar plates.

The species is primarily known from dental remains. The skull and lower jaws of an old adult male mammoth, now apparently lost, referred to M. africanavus, has been reported from Garet et Tir, Algeria, dating to the Late Pliocene. The specimen, though somewhat damaged and distorted when described unambiguously represents a mammoth, with a tall skull over 1.45 meters (4.8 ft) in height with an especially short basicranium, and narrow palate. The specimen had twisted tusks at least 2.3 meters (7.5 ft) long, which were narrowly separated from each other in their elongate tusk sheaths/sockets/alveoli, but sharply diverged from each other following their emergence from the skull. The skull was described by Maglio (1973) as similar to that of the primitive Eurasian mammoth species Mammuthus meridionalis.

Specimens intermediate between M. subplanifrons and M. africanavus have been reported from the Late Pliocene Hadar Formation, Ethiopia, dating to around 3.5 million years ago. The oldest specimens of M. africanavus date to around 3.5–3 million years ago, while the youngest specimen dates to around 2.32–2 million years ago.

At Aïn Boucherit in Algeria during the Early Pleistocene, the species lived alongside members of the genus Hippopotamus, rhinoceroses belonging to the genus Ceratotherium (which contains the living white rhinoceros), the suid (pig) Kolpochoerus, equines belonging to the genus Equus and Hipparion, the giant giraffid Sivatherium, the gomphothere Anancus, bovines, antelopes (Gazella, Kobus, Damaliscus, Megalotragus, Parmularius, Oreonagor and Parantidorcas) and canines (Canis, Vulpes).
