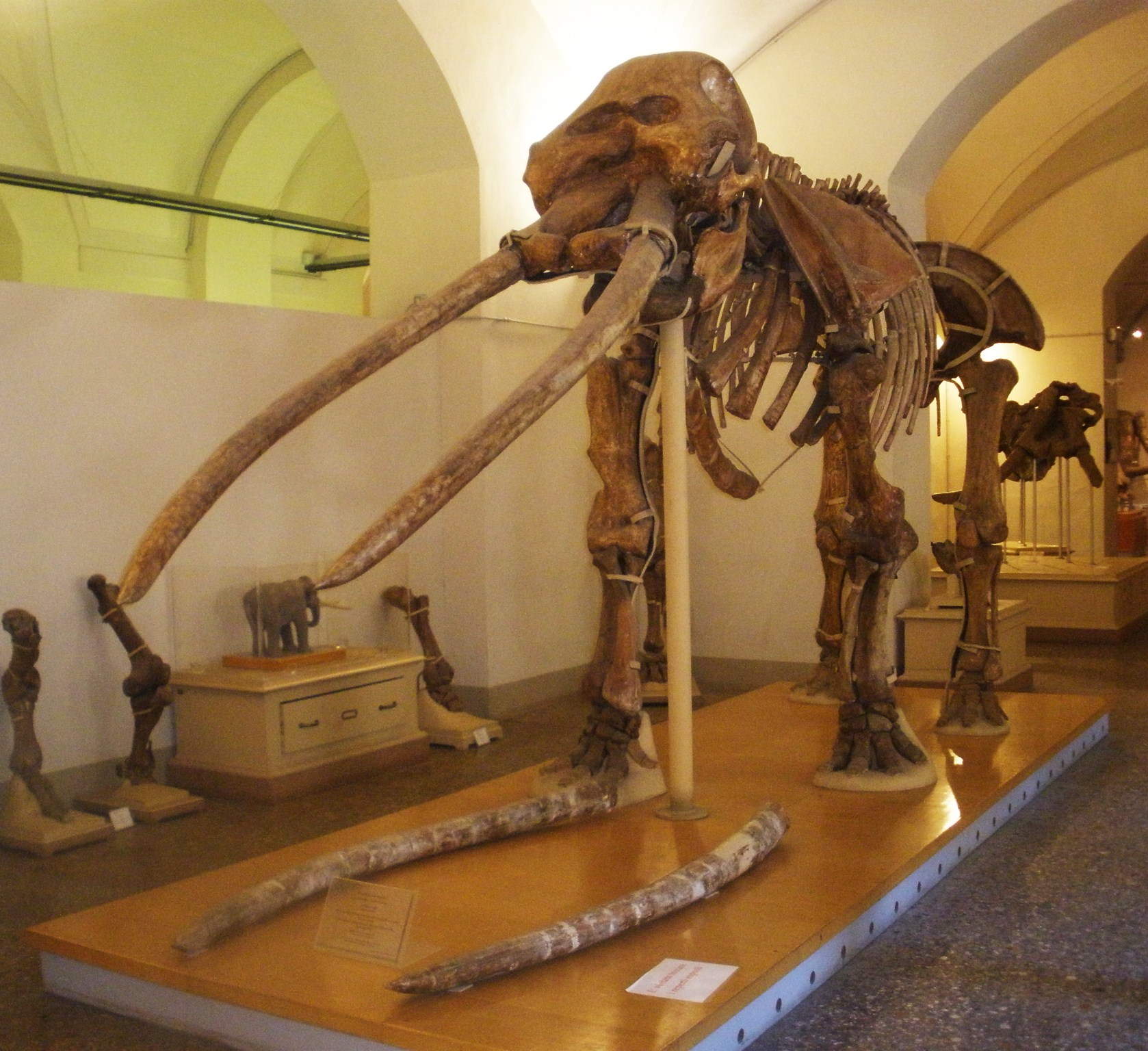
- One of the most complete A. arvernensis skeletons found clay layers near San Giovanni Valdarno and displayed in the Museo di Storia Naturale di Firenze in Tuscany, Italy

Scientific classification
- Kingdom: Animalia
- Phylum: Chordata
- Class: Mammalia
- Order: Proboscidea
- Superfamily: Elephantoidea
- Genus: †Anancus; Aymard in Dorlhac, 1855

Species
- A. alexeevae Baigusheva, 1971; A. arvernensis (Croizet and Jobert, 1828) (type); A. capensis Sanders, 2007; A. cuneatus Teilhard de Chardin and Trassaert, 1937; A. kazachstanensis Aubekerova, 1974; A. kenyensis MacInnes, 1942; A. lehmanni (Gaziry, 1997); A. osiris Arambourg, 1945; A. perimensis (Falconer and Cautley, 1847); A. petrocchii Coppens, 1965; A. sinensis Hopwood, 1935; A. sivalensis (Cautley, 1836); A. ultimus Sanders, 2011

= Anancus =

Anancus Temporal range: Late Miocene-Early Pleistocene (Tortonian to Gelasian) 8.5–2 Ma

Genus of proboscideans

Anancus is an extinct genus of "tetralophodont gomphothere" native to Afro-Eurasia, that lived from the Tortonian stage of the late Miocene until its extinction during the Early Pleistocene, roughly from 8.5–2 million years ago.

== Taxonomy ==
The type species, Anancus arvernensis, was originally named in 1828 by Jean-Baptiste Croizet and Antoine Claude Gabriel Jobert as Mastodon arvernensis, based on remains found within the vicinity of the Puy de Dôme volcano in the Massif Central in central southern France, with the species name deriving from the Auvergne region of France where it was found. Anancus was subsequently named by Auguste Aymard in 1855 in a publication by M. J. Dorlhac, also based on remains found in the Massif Central region. The genus name Anancus derives from the Latin word ancus meaning "bent/curved" and the negative prefix "an-" with the intended meaning of "uncurved" or "straight" in reference to the shape of the tusks. Anancus is traditionally allocated to Gomphotheriidae, often as the only member of the subfamily Anancinae. Recently, some authors have excluded Anancus along with other tetralophodont gomphotheres from Gomphotheriidae, and regarded them as members of Elephantoidea instead.

== Description ==
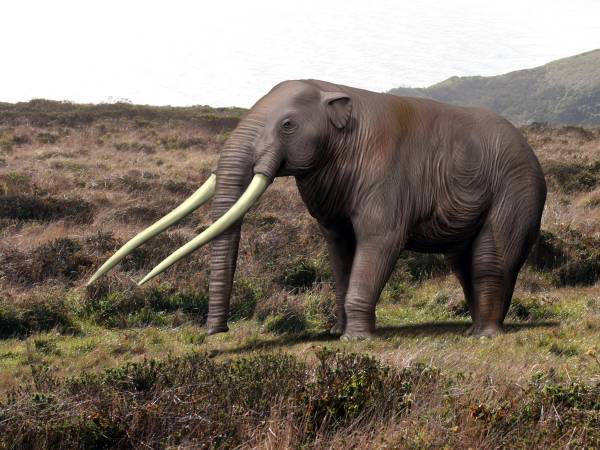
Anancus arvernensis

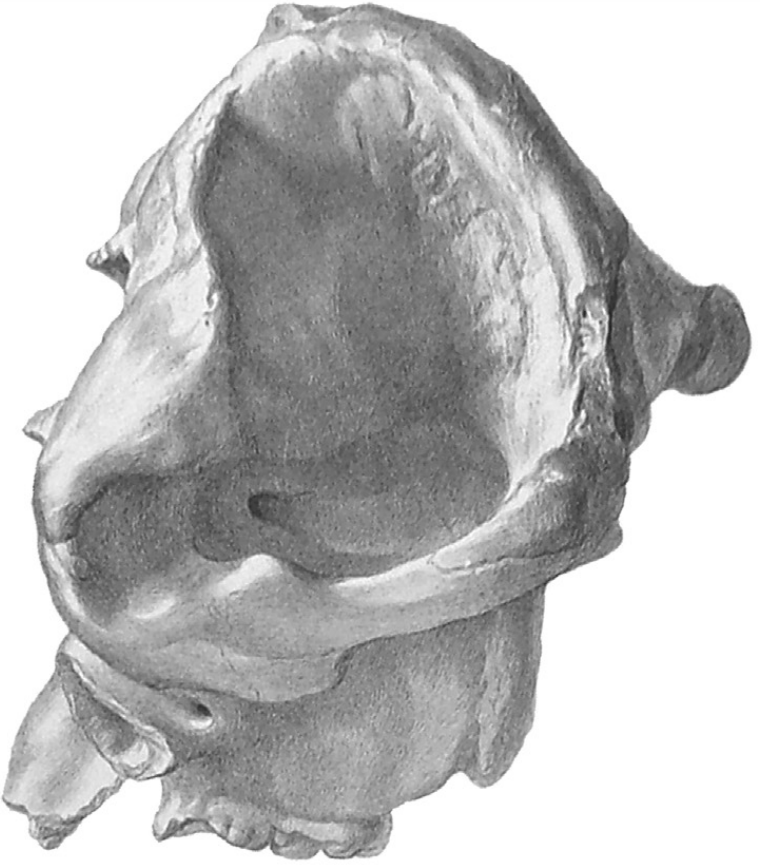
Skull of Anancus sivalensis in side view

Two largely complete individuals of Anancus arvernensis reached shoulder heights of around 2.5–2.6 metres (8 ft 2 in – 8 ft 6 in), with a volumetric estimate suggesting a body mass of around 5.2 to 6 tonnes (11,000 to 13,000 lb), comparable to living African bush elephants. The tusks were largely straight and lacked enamel (though enamel was present in juveniles) and were slender, and proportionally large, with a large tusk of the species Anancus avernensis from Stoina, Romania measuring 3.71 metres (12.2 ft) in length with an estimated mass of 70 kilograms (150 lb). The tusks varied from projecting forward parallel to each other, to being outwardly divergent from each other, depending on the species. The skull is proportionally tall and short, with an elevated dome and an enlarged tympanic bulla. Unlike more primitive gomphotheres, the mandible was brevirostrine (shortened), and lacked lower tusks. The skull of Anancus species is very similar to living elephants and like them they probably had free-hanging (pendulous) trunks. The molars were typically tetralophodont (bearing four crests or ridges) but were pentalophodont in some species. The premolars were absent in all species other than A. kenyensis. On the upper molars, the posterior pretrite central conules were reduced, as were the anterior pretrite central conules on the lower molars. The pretrite and posttrite half-loph(id)s were dislocated from each other, resulting in the successive loph(id)s exhibiting an alternating pattern.

== Diet and ecology ==
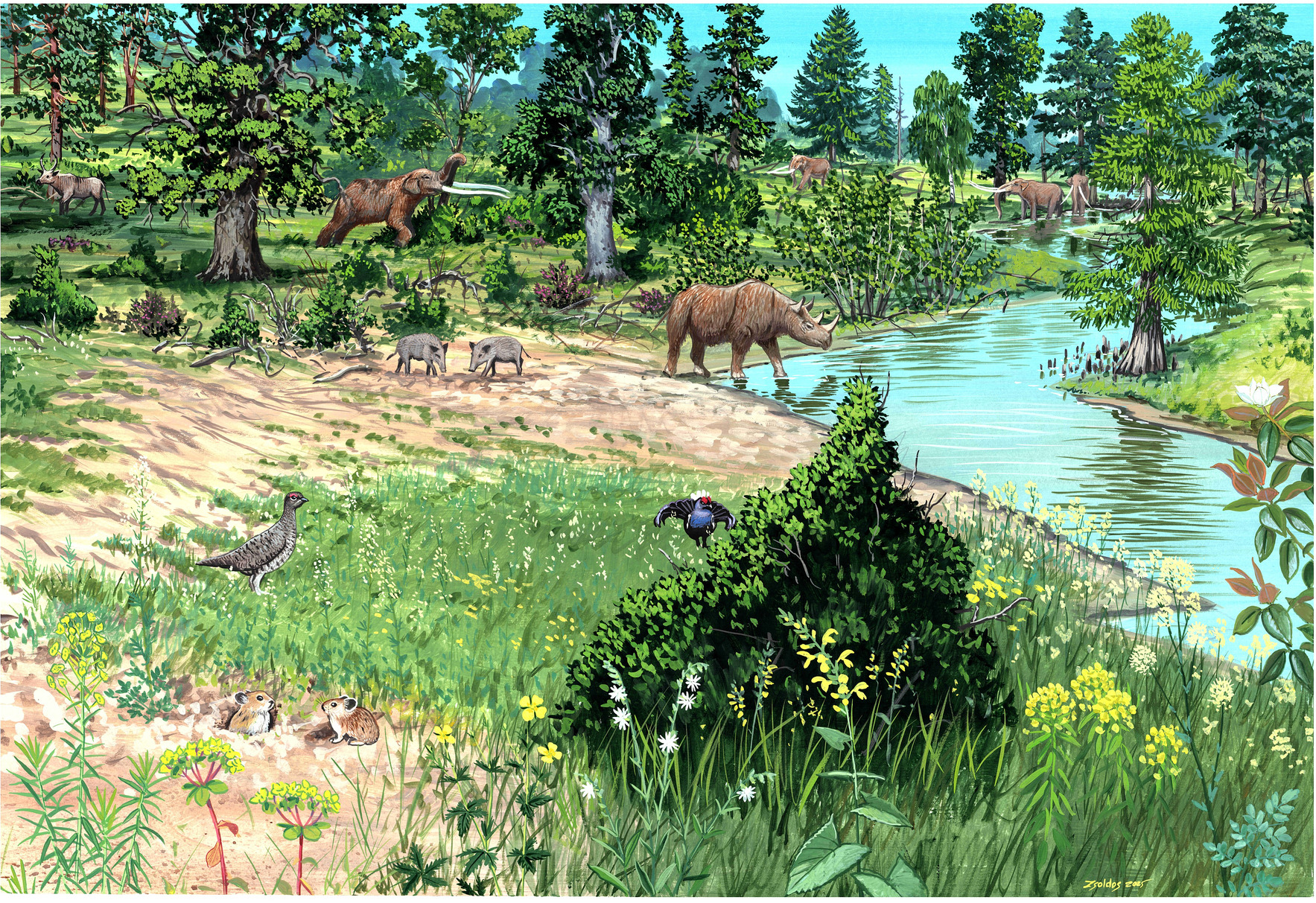
Individual of Anancus arvernensis (attacking a tree in the upper left) in a Pliocene temperate forested Central European landscape alongside the fellow proboscidean "Mammut" borsoni (background upper right), rhinoceros Stephanorhinus etruscus, the pig Sus minor and the bovine Leptobos stenometopon, alongside pikas, ptarmigans and grouse.

Dietary preferences of Anancus varied between species. Dental microwear analysis of Anancus arvernensis specimens from the Early Pleistocene of Europe generally suggests that it was a browser, consuming twigs, bark, seeds and fruit, with a browsing diet also proposed for the Early Pliocene South African A. capensis. The East African late Miocene-early Pliocene A. kenyensis and Pliocene A. ultimus have individuals with varying browsing, grazing, and mixed feeding (both browsing and grazing) diets, with a grazing diet proposed for Anancus sivalensis from the Pliocene of India based on isotopic analysis. Anancus osiris from the Pliocene of North Africa is suggested to have been a mixed feeder with a large grass intake based on microwear.

Anancus often coexisted alongside other proboscideans, such as the larger mastodon "Mammut" borsoni in Pliocene Europe. During the Pliocene-Early Pleistocene, Anancus coexisted with elephantids, including mammoths (Mammuthus rumanus and Mammuthus meridionalis in Europe and Mammuthus subplanifrons in South Africa), and Loxodonta cookei (in South Africa) who Anancus is suggested to have engaged in habitat and diet-based niche partitioning with.

== Evolution ==
Anancus is suggested to have evolved from Tetralophodon or a Tetralophodon-like ancestor. The oldest known species of Anancus is A. perimensis, with fossils known from the Tortonian ~ 8.5 million years ago Piram Island of western India. Anancus entered Europe approximately 7.2 million years ago and around 7 million years ago dispersed into Africa. Anancus first appeared in China around 6 million years ago (A. sinensis). Anancus disappeared from Asia and Africa around the end of the Pliocene, approximately 2.6 million years ago. The extinction of Anancus in Africa has been attributed to competitive exclusion by elephantids, whose molar teeth were more efficient at processing grass. The European A. arvernensis was the last surviving species, becoming extinct during the Early Pleistocene, around 2 million years ago, with its latest possible record being at Eastern Scheldt in the Netherlands around 1.6 million years ago.

== Gallery ==
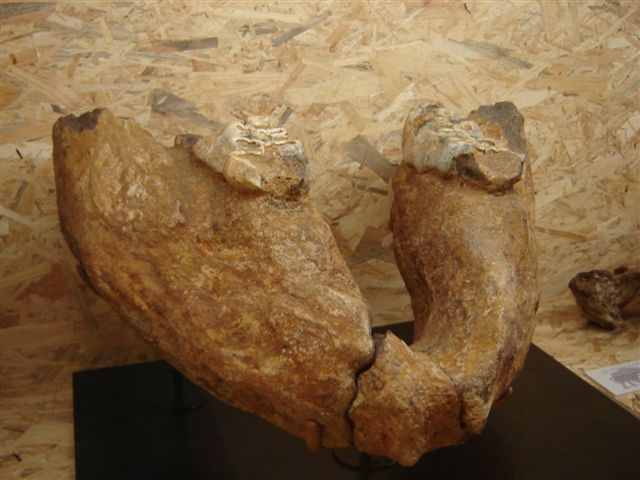
The jaw of Anancus, an extinct relative of the elephant

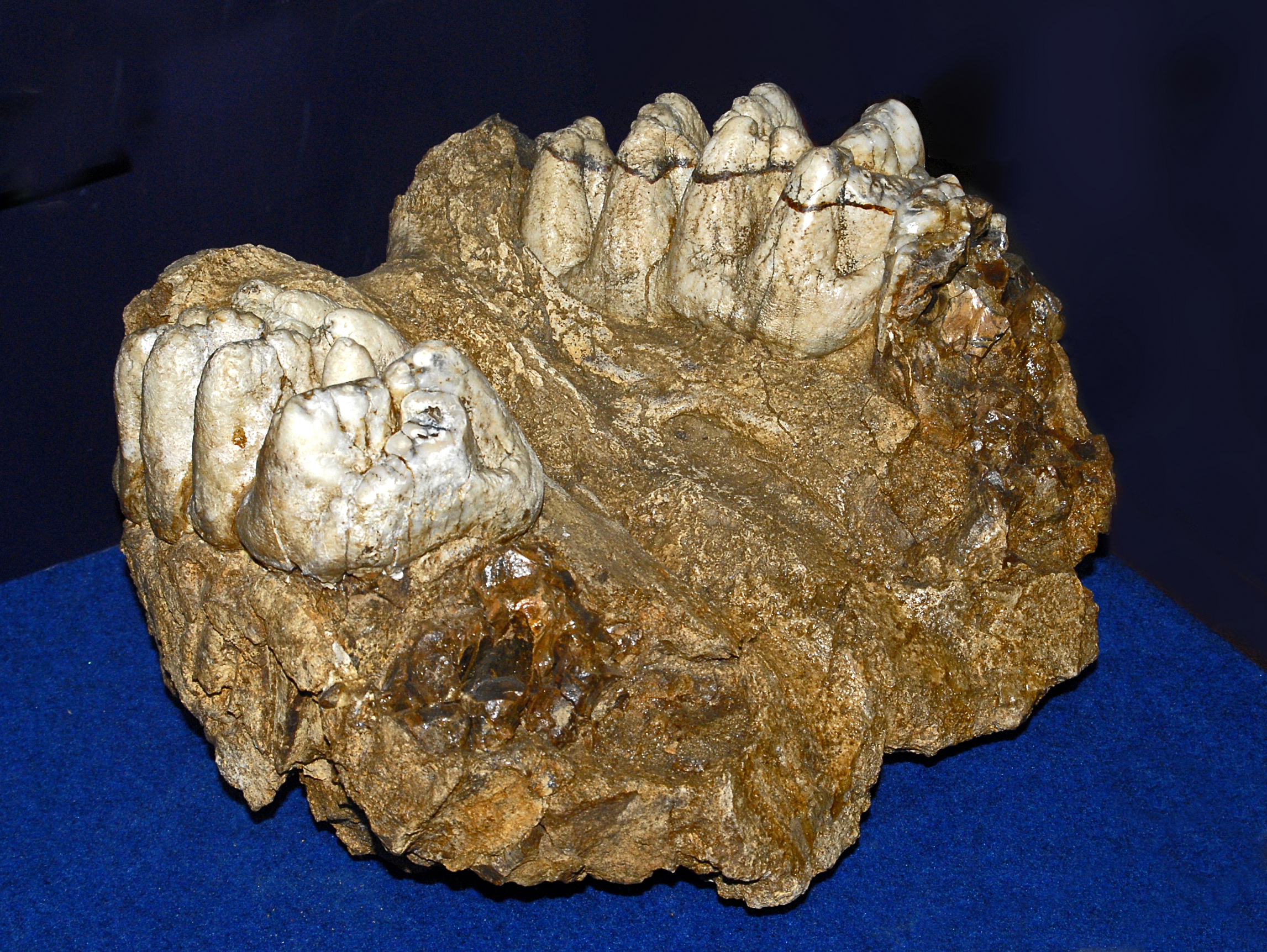
Jaw of Anancus arvernensis from Quaternary of Italy

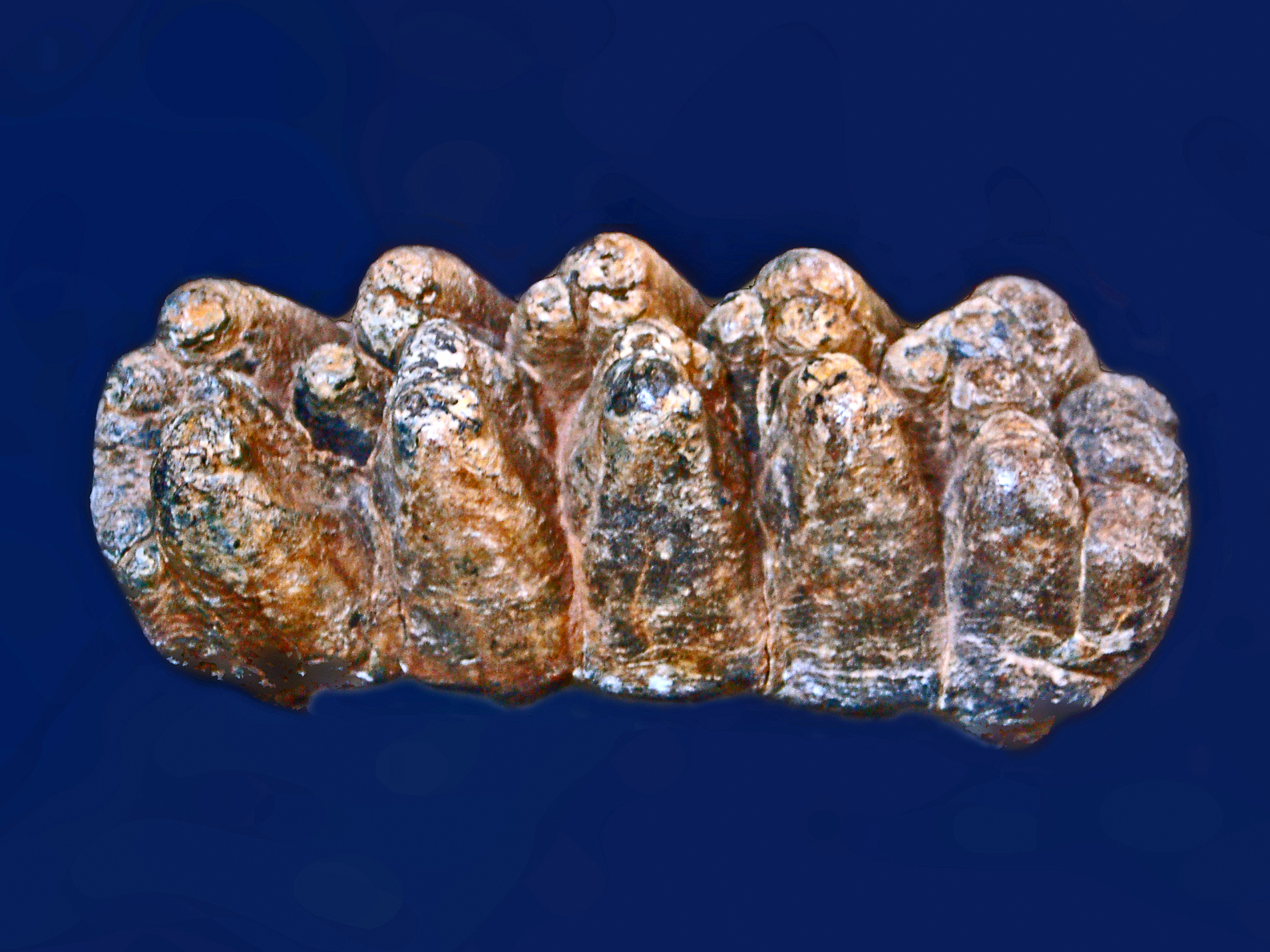
Molar of Anancus arvernensis
