= Mammuthus rumanus =

Mammuthus rumanus Temporal range: Late Pliocene, 3.2–2.6 Ma

Scientific classification
- Kingdom: Animalia
- Phylum: Chordata
- Class: Mammalia
- Infraclass: Placentalia
- Order: Proboscidea
- Family: Elephantidae
- Genus: †Mammuthus
- Species: †M. rumanus

Binomial name
- †Mammuthus rumanus Ștefănescu, 1924

Extinct species of mammal

Mammuthus rumanus is a species of mammoth that lived during the Pliocene in Eurasia. It the oldest mammoth species known outside of Africa, and probably ancestral to the subsequent species Mammuthus meridionalis.

== Evolution ==
Mammuthus rumanus is suggested to have originated in Africa. Material intermediate between African mammoths and Mammuthus rumanus has been reported from Bethlehem in the Levant, dating to sometime in the Late Pliocene, around 3-4 million years ago. The oldest calibrated dates for Mammuthus rumanus and mammoths outside Africa are from Romania, dating to around 3.2 million years ago. Remains have been reported spanning from Great Britain to China. It is probably ancestral to Mammuthus meridionalis.

== Description ==
Mammuthus rumanus is only known from fragmentary remains, typically isolated teeth, with a mandible also known. The number of plates on the third molar teeth is around 8-10, consistently lower than is known in other non-African mammoth species, including M. meridionalis.

== Ecology ==
Studies of specimens from the Red Crag Formation of England found that they likely consumed browse and inhabited open environments. In Europe, it coexisted alongside other proboscideans, including the mastodon species "Mammut" borsoni and the "tetralophodont gomphothere" Anancus arvernensis, likely niche partitioning with the latter by occupying different habitats. Dental mesowear of M. cf. rumanus individuals in northern Greece is indicative of them having a grazing diet.
