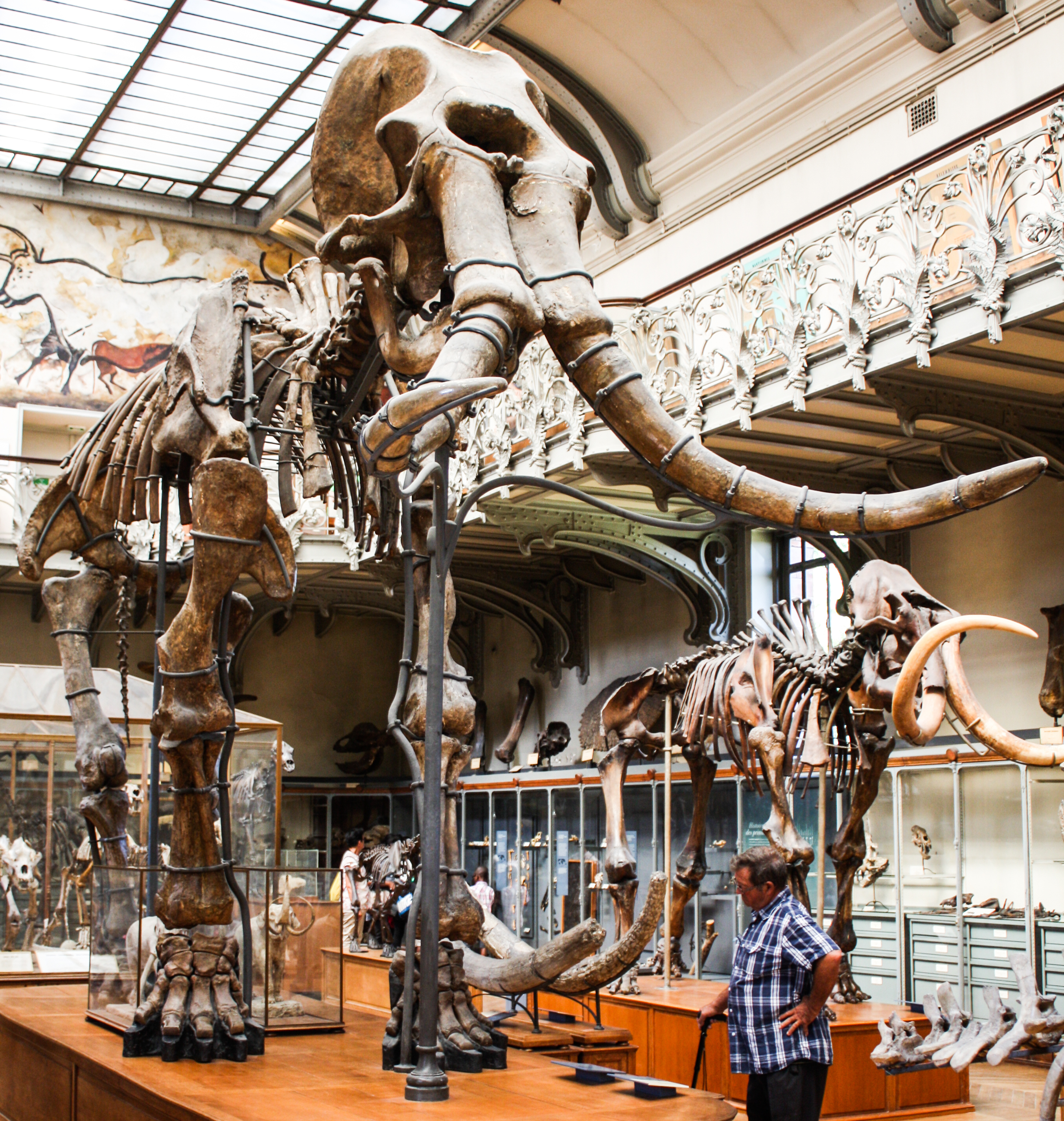
- Mounted skeleton of the Durfort mammoth, National Museum of Natural History, France (Muséum national d'histoire naturelle)

Scientific classification
- Kingdom: Animalia
- Phylum: Chordata
- Class: Mammalia
- Order: Proboscidea
- Family: Elephantidae
- Genus: †Mammuthus
- Species: †M. meridionalis

Binomial name
- †Mammuthus meridionalis (Nesti, 1825)

Synonyms
- Archidiskodon meridionalis; Mammuthus gromovi (Alexeeva & Garutt, 1965); Mammuthus meridionalis vestinus; M. m. voigtstedtensis (Dietrich, 1965)

= Mammuthus meridionalis =

Mammuthus meridionalis Temporal range: 2.5–0.8 Ma Early Pleistocene

Extinct species of mammoth

Mammuthus meridionalis, sometimes called the southern mammoth (in reference to the species name meridionalis, which is Latin for "southern"), is an extinct species of mammoth native to Eurasia during the Early Pleistocene. Reaching a size exceeding modern elephants, unlike later Eurasian mammoth species, it was largely native to temperate climates and probably did not have a thick layer of fur. First appearing around 2.5 million years ago, probably descending from Mammuthus rumanus, it survived latest in Europe until around 800,000 years ago when it was replaced by the steppe mammoth (Mammuthus trogontherii) and the straight-tusked elephant (Palaeoloxodon antiquus). It is the likely ancestor of the dwarf Mammuthus creticus on the island of Crete.

== Taxonomy ==
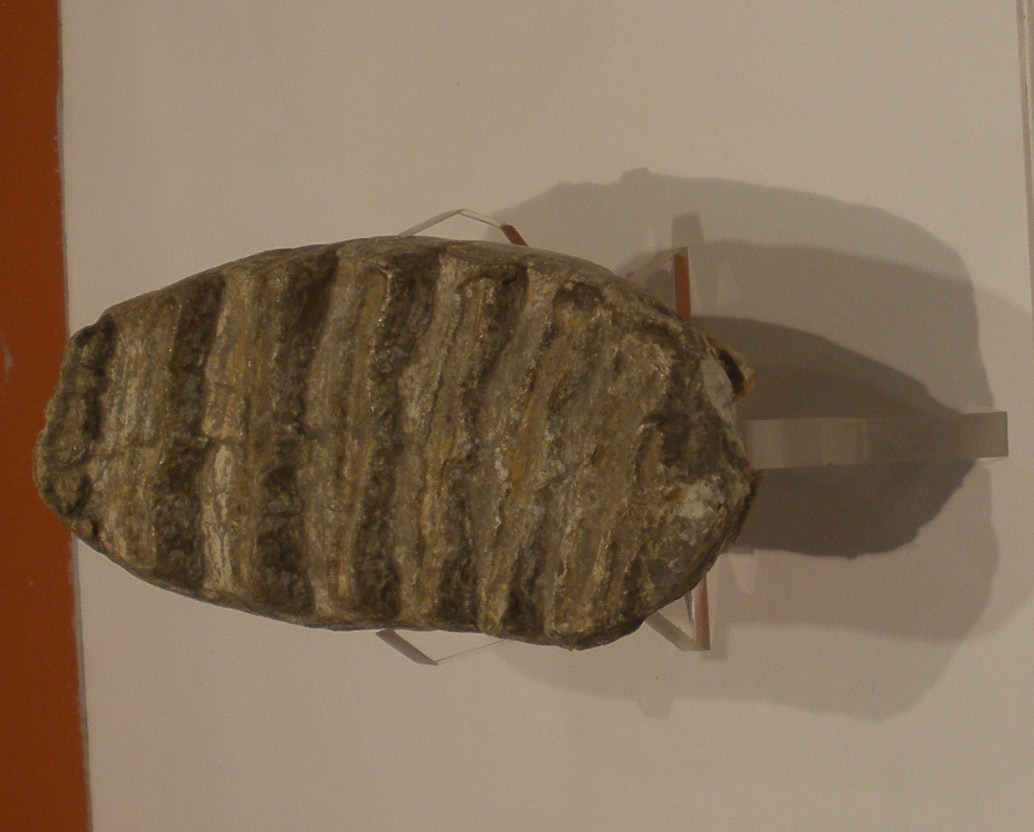
Molar

Mammuthus meridionalis was originally named by Filippo Nesti in 1825 as Elephas meridionalis based on remains collected from the Upper Valdarno region in Tuscany, Italy, dating to the Early Pleistocene, around 1.8 million years ago.

The taxonomy of extinct elephants was complicated by the early 20th century, and in 1942, Henry Fairfield Osborn's posthumous monograph on the Proboscidea was published, wherein he used various taxon names that had previously been proposed for mammoth species, including replacing Mammuthus with Mammonteus, as he believed the former name to be invalidly published. Mammoth taxonomy was simplified by various researchers from the 1970s onwards, all species were retained in the genus Mammuthus, and many proposed differences between species were instead interpreted as intraspecific variation. The name Archidiskodon meridionalis is retained by some Russian researchers for the species.

== Description ==
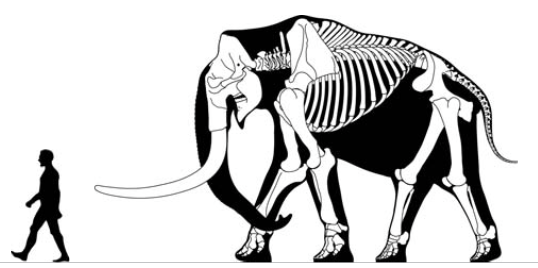
Skeletal restoration of a 4 metre tall male

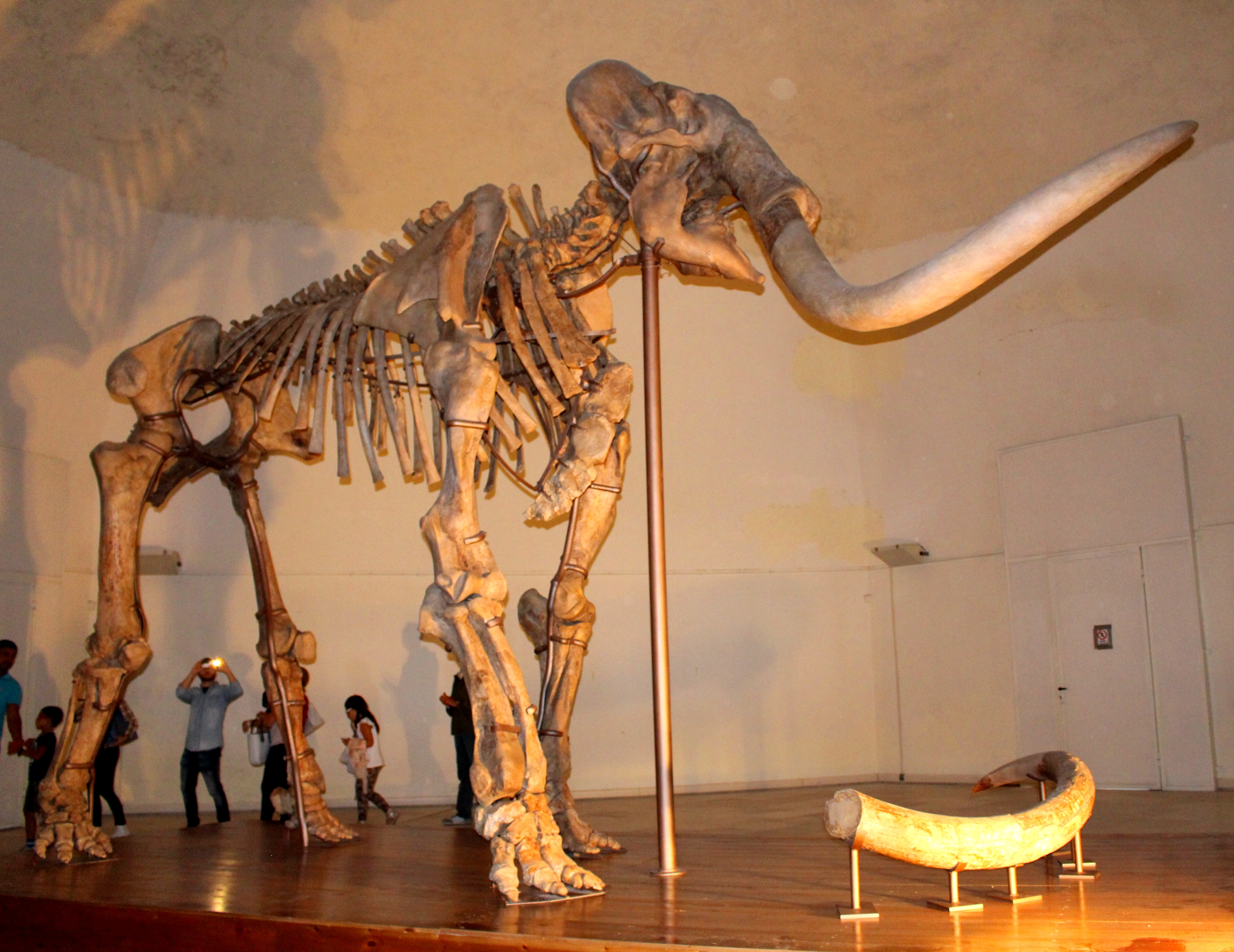
Complete skeleton in the Museo Nazionale d'Abruzzo, Italy

M. meridionalis was a large proboscidean, exceeding modern elephants in size. A mature adult male known from a mostly complete skeleton displayed at Forte Spagnolo, L'Aquila, Italy, estimated to be approximately 3.97–4.05 m (13.0–13.3 ft) tall at the shoulder in the flesh, was volumetrically estimated to weigh 10.7–11.4 tonnes (11.8–12.6 short tons). Such sizes are suggested to have been typical for males of this species. Like modern elephants females were considerably smaller, with estimated average adult shoulder height of 3.3 m (10.8 ft) and a weight of around 7 tonnes (7.7 short tons). The head represented the highest point of the animal. The body was broad and the back was noticeably sloped. It had robust, elongated twisted tusks, common of mammoths. M. meridionalis lived in relatively warm climates, which makes it probable that it more closely resembled living elephants in the amount of body hair, rather than the densely furred bodies of later mammoth species. The ears are also suggested to have been medium-large sized, with the tail being shorter than living elephants but longer than later mammoth species.

Like other mammoths, the skull is relatively narrow from front to back, and has a high vault. The shape of the skull of European M. meridionalis specimens from the Upper Valdaro of Italy differs noticeably from later mammoth species, differing from the woolly mammoth (Mammuthus primigenius) in characters such as the skull being somewhat wider from front to back (antero-posteriorly), the premaxillary bones (which contain the tusks) being broader towards the sides (medio-laterally), the vertex (highest point) of the skull being less pointed in side-on (lateral) view and being placed further back (more posteriorly), the upper (dorsal) surface of the skull having a more concave shape, and the orbital region of the skull being narrower from side-to-side. The shape of the skull of Upper Valdarno individuals varied somewhat depending on stage of growth and sex. The molars had compared to later mammoth species relatively low crowns, and around 13 thick enamel ridges (lamellae) on the third molars, with the lamellar frequency being substantially lower than the number in later mammoth species, though higher than that of earlier Mammuthus rumanus. Later European M. meridionalis populations differ from early representatives of the species by having shorter and taller skulls and mandibles, differing shapes of the temporal fossa, orbits and tusk alveoli (sockets), and an increase in the number of lamellae on the teeth and tooth crown height (hypsodonty).

== Paleobiology and paleoecology ==
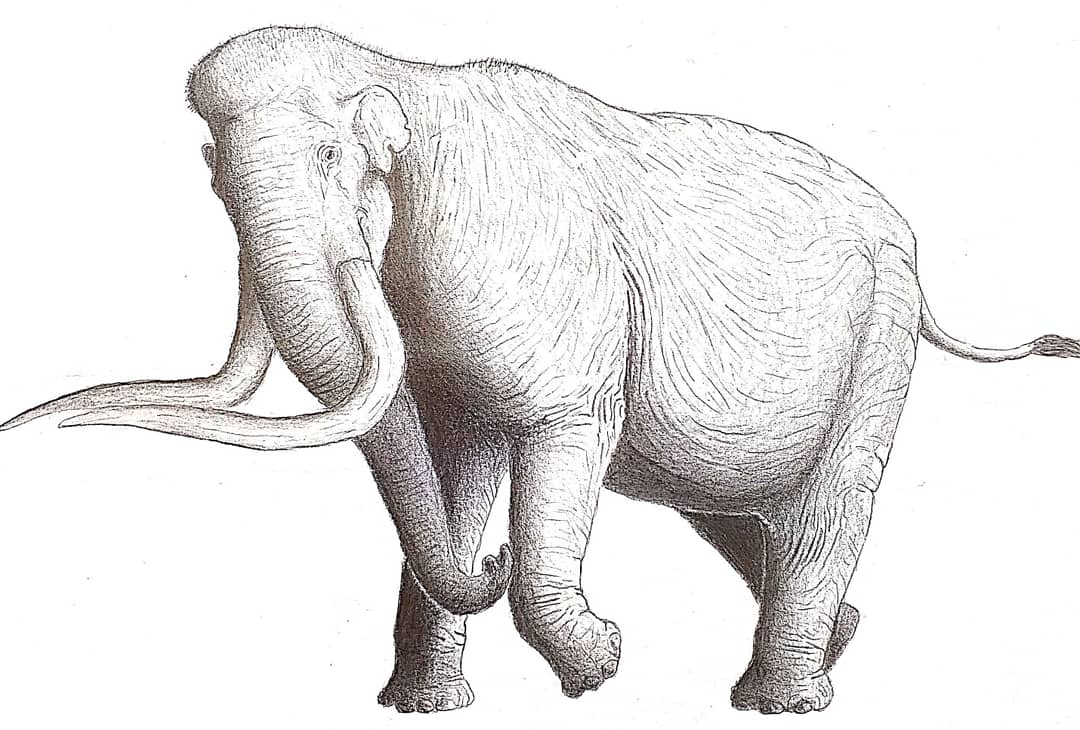
Mammuthus meridionalis reconstruction

Fossilized plants found with the remains show that M. meridionalis was living in a time of mild climate, generally as warm or slightly warmer than Europe experiences today. Some populations inhabited woodlands, which included oak, ash, beech and other familiar European trees, as well as some that are now exotic to the region, such as hemlock, wing nut and hickory. Further east, discoveries at Ubeidiya (Israel) and Dmanisi (Georgia) show the early mammoth living in a partially open habitat with grassy areas.

Dental microwear of the teeth of M. meridionalis suggest that the species was a variable mixed feeder, that consumed both grass and browse, with its diet varying according to local conditions, with some populations exhibiting browse-dominated feeding, while others grass-dominant. Bioapatite δ^{13}C analysis of M. meridionalis from Barranc de la Boella suggests it foraged in mesic, seasonally arid C_{3} grasslands.

A 60 year old male specimen of M. meridionalis from Madonna della Strada, Italy, has only one complete tusk, with the other tusk almost entirely broken off with an oblique fracture, which analysis showed considerably predated death, resulting in chronic inflammation (pulpitis) of the remaining tusk as well as scoliosis of the animal's spine (including the fusion of the atlas and axis vertebrae), and altering of molar wear patterns, due to the unbalanced head. The fracture pattern of the tusk is common among modern male elephants who have broken their tusks in combat with other males, which may suggest that M. meridionalis males engaged in similar fighting behaviour.

During the early part of its existence in Europe, it existed alongside the "tetralophodont gomphothere" Anancus arvernensis. Dietary analysis based on microwear suggests that there was niche partitioning between the two species, with M. meridonalis occupying more open habitats. Other large animals that existed alongside Mammuthus meridionalis in Early Pleistocene Europe include rhinoceroses of the genus Stephanorhinus, the large hippo Hippopotamus antiquus, giant deer of the genera Praemegaceros and Eucladoceros, bovines of the genus Leptobos, replaced towards the end of the Early Pleistocene by Bison, and equines such as Equus altidens and Equus suessenbornensis.

Juvenile Mammuthus meridionalis have been suggested to have at least occasionally been preyed upon by the large sabertooth cat Homotherium latidens, based on isotopic analysis of specimens from the Venta Micena locality in southeast Spain. Remains from the Fuente Nueva-3 site also in southeast Spain suggests that carcasses of Mammuthus meridionalis were at times scavenged on by the giant hyena Pachycrocuta; M. meridionalis remains from Barranc de la Boella display similar evidence of being gnawed on by hyaenids.

== Evolution ==
Since many remains of each species of mammoth are known from several localities, it is possible to reconstruct the evolutionary history of the genus through morphological studies. Mammoth species can be identified from the number of enamel ridges (or lamellar plates) on their molars: primitive species had few ridges, and the number increased gradually as new species evolved to feed on more abrasive food items. The crowns of the teeth became deeper in height and the skulls became taller to accommodate this. At the same time, the skulls became shorter from front to back to minimise the weight of the head.

Mammuthus meridionalis is thought to descend from Mammuthus rumanus, the oldest mammoth species known outside of Africa, with the earliest records of M. meridionalis dating to around 2.6-2.5 million years ago, at the beginning of the Pleistocene. Some early members of M. meridionalis spanning from 2.6-2.0 million years ago were historically assigned to the species M. gromovi, which some authors have regarded as the subspecies M. meridionalis gromovi. A population of M. meridionalis evolved into the steppe mammoth (M. trogontherii) with 18–20 third molar ridges in eastern Asia, prior to 1.7 million years ago. The Columbian mammoth (M. columbi) evolved from a population of M. trogontherii that had crossed the Bering Strait and entered North America about 1.5 million years ago, and not M. meridionalis as has been historically suggested. Later European M. merdionalis specimens including those from the type Upper Valdarno locality, dated to around 1.8 million years ago, are thought to represent a distinct lineage that is not ancestral to later Middle Pleistocene and Late Pleistocene mammoths such as the woolly mammoth.

European M. meridionalis specimens from around 2-1.7 million years ago are assigned to the subspecies M. meridionalis meridionalis. Advanced late Early Pleistocene populations of M. meridionalis in Europe, spanning from around 1.7-0.8 million years ago are assigned to the subspecies M. meridionalis vestinus (including the likely synonym M. meridionalis depereti) and M. meridionalis tamanensis. These two subspecies may be synonymous with each other. Steppe mammoths replaced M. meridionalis in Europe in a diachronous mosaic pattern at the end of the Early Pleistocene, between around 1 and 0.8-0.7 million years ago, which was also co-incident with the arrival of the straight-tusked elephant (Palaeoloxodon antiquus) into Europe, which may have out-competed M. meridionalis. During the interval of replacement, M. meridionalis and M. trogontherii may have co-existed in some localities, with rare specimens with molar morphology intermediate between the two species suggesting that there may have been hybridisation between them. Fossilised molars from the North Sea region suggest that for a time it may have alternated between occupation by M. meridionalis and M. trogontherii, the former being present in intervals of relative warmth and the latter in cooler intervals, perhaps occasionally coexisting.

The dwarf mammoth species Mammuthus creticus, which inhabited the island of Crete at some point during the Early Pleistocene to early Middle Pleistocene, is suggested to have descended from M. meridionalis.

== Relationship with humans ==
Remains of M. meridionalis at several sites have been found with cut marks and/or associated with stone tools, suggested to represent evidence of butchery by archaic humans. A number of bones of Mammuthus meridionalis from the Dmanisi Paleolithic site in Georgia, dating to 1.8 million years ago have cut marks likely created by Homo georgicus whose remains are also found at the site. At the Fuente Nueva-3 and Barranc de la Boella sites in Spain, dating to approximately 1.3 and 1-0.8 million years ago respectively, remains of M. meridionalis are associated with stone tools (in the latter site of the Acheulean type), primarily lithic flakes. At Barranc de la Boella, some rib bones possibly bear cut marks, with cut marks being definitively reported from bones found at Fuente Nueva-3. Though no human remains have been found at these sites, Homo antecessor has been recorded from roughly contemporaneous deposits elsewhere in Spain. These sites likely represent evidence of opportunistic scavenging, rather than active hunting.

== Bibliography ==
- Lister, A.; Bahn, P. (2007). Mammoths - Giants of the Ice Age (3 ed.). London: Frances Lincoln. ISBN 978-0-520-26160-0.
