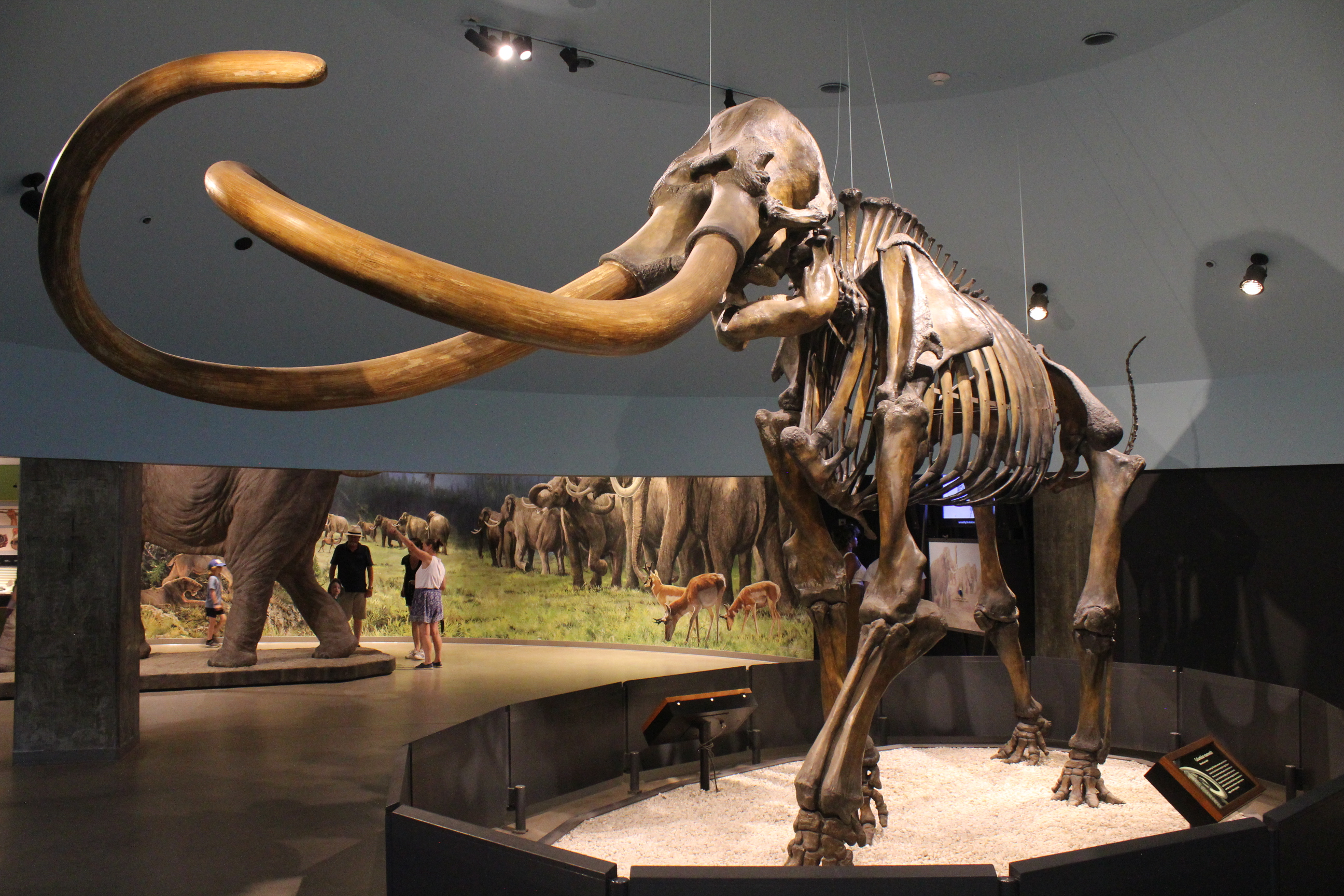
- Columbian mammoth (Mammuthus columbi) in the Page Museum in Los Angeles

Scientific classification
- Kingdom: Animalia
- Phylum: Chordata
- Class: Mammalia
- Order: Proboscidea
- Family: Elephantidae
- Subfamily: Elephantinae
- Tribe: Elephantini
- Genus: †Mammuthus; Brookes, 1828

Type species
- †Elephas primigenius (original combination) Blumenbach, 1799

Species
- †M. africanavus; †M. columbi; †M. creticus; †M. exilis; †M. lamarmorai; †M. meridionalis; †M. primigenius; †M. rumanus; †M. subplanifrons; †M. trogontherii

Synonyms
- Archidiskodon Pohling, 1888; Parelephas Osborn, 1924; Mammonteus

= Mammoth =

Mammoth Temporal range: Late Miocene to Late Holocene, 6.2–0.004 Ma

Extinct genus of mammals

A mammoth is a member of the extinct elephantid genus Mammuthus. They lived from the late Miocene epoch (from around 6.2 million years ago) into the Holocene until about 4,000 years ago, with mammoth species at various times inhabiting Africa, Asia, Europe and North America. Mammoths are distinguished from living elephants by their (typically large) spirally twisted tusks and in some later species, the development of numerous adaptions to living in cold environments, including a thick layer of fur.

Mammoths and Asian elephants are more closely related to each other than they are to African elephants. The oldest mammoth representative, Mammuthus subplanifrons, appeared around 6 million years ago during the late Miocene in southern and Eastern Africa. Later in the Pliocene, by about three million years ago, mammoths dispersed into Eurasia, eventually covering most of Eurasia before migrating into North America around 1.5–1.3 million years ago, becoming ancestral to the Columbian mammoth (M. columbi). The woolly mammoth (M. primigenius) evolved about 700–400,000 years ago in Siberia, with some surviving on Russia's Wrangel Island in the Arctic Ocean until as recently as 4,000 years ago, still extant during the existence of the earliest civilisations in ancient Egypt and Mesopotamia.

== Etymology and early observations ==
According to The American Heritage Dictionary, the word "mammoth" likely originates from *mān-oŋt, a word in the Mansi languages of western Siberia meaning "earth horn", in reference to mammoth tusks. Mammoths appear in the narratives of the indigenous people of Siberia, who were impressed by the great size of their remains. In the narratives of the Evenk people, mammoths were responsible for the creation of the world, digging up the land from the ocean floor with their tusks. The Selkup thought that mammoths lived underground and guarded the underworld, while the Nenets and the Mansi (the latter of whom, along with the Khanty, conceived mammoths as giant birds) thought that mammoths were responsible for the creation of mountains and lakes, while the Yakuts regarded mammoths as water spirits.

The word mammoth was first used in Europe during the early 17th century, when referring to maimanto tusks discovered in Siberia, as recorded in the 1618 edition of the Dictionariolum Russico-Anglicum. The earliest scientific research paper on mammoths was by Vasily Tatishchev in 1725. John Bell, who was on the Ob River in 1722, said that mammoth tusks were well known in the area. They were called "mammon's horn" and were often found in washed-out river banks. Bell bought one and presented it to Hans Sloan who pronounced it an elephant's tooth.

In the American colonies around 1725, enslaved Africans digging in the vicinity of the Stono River in South Carolina unearthed molar teeth recognised in modern times to belong to Columbian mammoths, with the remains subsequently examined by the British naturalist Mark Catesby, who visited the site, and later published an account of his visit in 1743. Catesby noted that the slaves unanimously agreed that the objects were the teeth of elephants similar to those from their African homeland, to which Catesby concurred, marking the first technical identification of any fossil animal in North America.

In 1796, French biologist Georges Cuvier was the first to identify woolly mammoth remains not as modern elephants transported to the Arctic, but as an entirely new species. He argued this species had gone extinct and no longer existed, a concept that was not widely accepted at the time. Following Cuvier's identification, German naturalist Johann Friedrich Blumenbach gave the woolly mammoth its scientific name, Elephas primigenius, in 1799, placing it in the Elephas, the genus which today contains the Asian elephant (Elephas maximus). Originally the African elephants, as well as the American mastodon (described in 1792) were also placed in Elephas. Cuvier coined the synonym Elephas mammonteus for the woolly mammoth a few months later, but E. primigenius became the widely used name for the species, including by Cuvier. The genus name Mammuthus was coined by British anatomist Joshua Brookes in 1828, as part of a survey of his museum collection.

Thomas Jefferson, who famously had a keen interest in paleontology, is partially responsible for transforming the word mammoth from a noun describing the prehistoric elephant to an adjective describing anything of surprisingly large size. The first recorded use of the word as an adjective was in a description of a large wheel of cheese (the "Cheshire Mammoth Cheese") given to Jefferson in 1802.

== Evolution ==
The earliest known proboscideans, the clade that contains the elephants, arose about 55 million years ago on the landmass of Afro-Arabia. The closest relatives of the Proboscidea are the sirenians and the hyraxes. The family Elephantidae arose a million years ago in Africa, including the living elephants and mammoths. Among many now-extinct clades, the mastodon is only a distant relative of the mammoths and part of the separate Mammutidae family, which diverged 25 million years before the mammoths evolved.

Following the publication of the woolly mammoths mitochondrial genome sequence in 1997, it has since become widely accepted that mammoths and Asian elephants share a closer relationship with each other than either do to African elephants.

The following cladogram shows the placement of the genus Mammuthus among other proboscideans, based on hyoid characteristics and genetics:

- - Elephantimorpha
    - †Mammutidae (mastodons)
    - Elephantida
      - †Gomphotheriidae (gomphotheres)
      - Elephantoidea
        - †Stegodontidae (stegodontids)
        - Elephantidae
          - - Loxodonta (African elephants)
            - †Palaeoloxodon (straight-tusked elephants)
          - - Elephas (Asian elephants)
            - †Mammuthus (mammoths)

It is possible to reconstruct the evolutionary history of the genus through morphological studies. Mammoth species can be identified from the number of enamel ridges/lamellae on their molars; the primitive species had few ridges, which increased gradually as new species evolved and replaced the former ones. At the same time, the crowns of the teeth became longer, and the skulls became higher from top to bottom and shorter from the back to the front over time to accommodate this.

The earliest mammoths, assigned to the species Mammuthus subplanifrons, are known from southern and eastern Africa, with the earliest records dating to the Late Miocene, around 6.2–5.3 million years ago. By the Late Pliocene, mammoths had become confined to the northern portions of the African continent with remains from this time assigned to Mammuthus africanavus. During the Late Pliocene, by 3.2 million years ago, mammoths dispersed into Eurasia via the Sinai Peninsula. The earliest mammoths in Eurasia are assigned to the species Mammuthus rumanus. The youngest remains of mammoths in Africa are from Aïn Boucherit, Algeria dating to the Early Pleistocene, around 2.3–2 million years ago (with a possible later record from Aïn Hanech, Algeria, dating to 1.95–1.78 million years ago).

Mammuthus rumanus is thought to be the ancestor of Mammuthus meridionalis, which first appeared at the beginning of the Pleistocene, around 2.6 million years ago. Mammuthus meridionalis subsequently gave rise to Mammuthus trogontherii (the steppe mammoth) in Eastern Asia around 1.7 million years ago. Around 1.5–1.3 million years ago, M. trogontherii crossed the Bering Land Bridge into North America, becoming ancestral to Mammuthus columbi (the Columbian mammoth). At the end of the Early Pleistocene Mammuthus trogontherii migrated into Europe, replacing M. meridionalis around 1–0.8 million years ago. Mammuthus primigenius (the woolly mammoth) had evolved from M. trogontherii in Siberia by around 600,000–500,000 years ago, replacing M. trogontherii in Europe by around 200,000 years ago, and migrated into North America during the Late Pleistocene.

Several dwarf mammoth species, with small body sizes, evolved on islands as a result of insular dwarfism. These include Mammuthus lamarmorai on Sardinia (late Middle-Late Pleistocene), Mammuthus exilis on the Channel Islands of California (Late Pleistocene), and Mammuthus creticus on Crete (Early Pleistocene).

== Description ==
Like living elephants, mammoths typically had large body sizes. The largest known species like Mammuthus meridionalis and Mammuthus trogontherii (the steppe mammoth) were considerably larger than modern elephants, with mature adult males having an average height of approximately 3.8–4.2 m (12 ft 6 in – 13 ft 9 in) at the shoulder and weights of 9.6–12.7 tonnes (21,000–28,000 lb), while exceptionally large males may have reached 4.5 m (14 ft 9 in) at the shoulder and 14.3 tonnes (32,000 lb) in weight. However, woolly mammoths were considerably smaller, only about as large as modern African bush elephants with males around 2.8–3.15 m (9 ft 2 in – 10 ft 4 in) high at the shoulder, and 4.5–6 tonnes (9,900–13,200 lb) in weight on average, with the largest recorded individuals being around 3.49 m (11 ft 5 in) tall and 8.2 tonnes (18,000 lb) in weight. The insular dwarf mammoth species were considerably smaller, with the smallest species M. creticus estimated to have a shoulder height of only around one metre (three feet) and a weight of about 180 kilograms (400 lb), making it one of the smallest elephantids known.

Gallery of mammoth skeletons
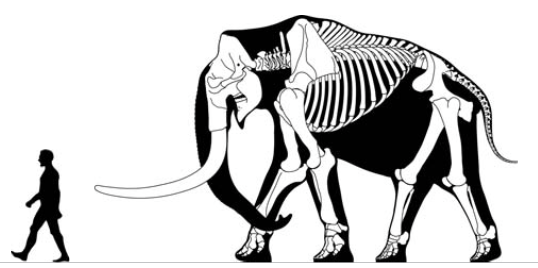
Mammuthus meridionalis bull, around 4 metres (13 ft) tall

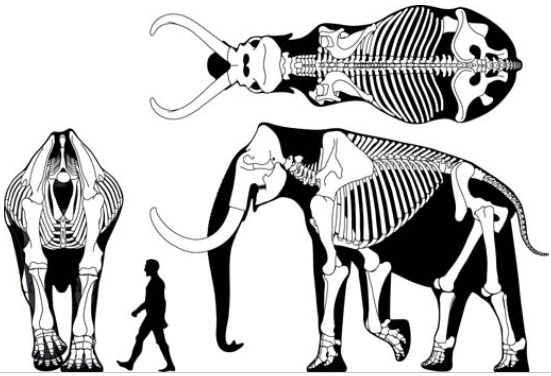
Steppe mammoth (M. trogontherii) around 3.9 m (12 ft 10 in) tall in front-on (without head) side-on and top-down views

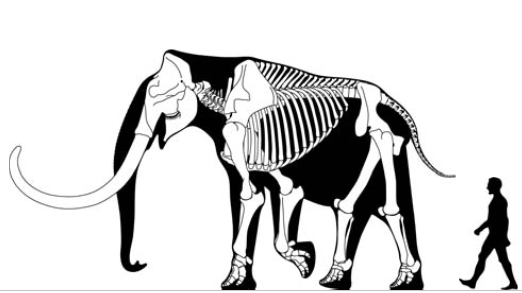
Columbian mammoth (M. columbi) bull around 3.7 m (12 ft 2 in) tall

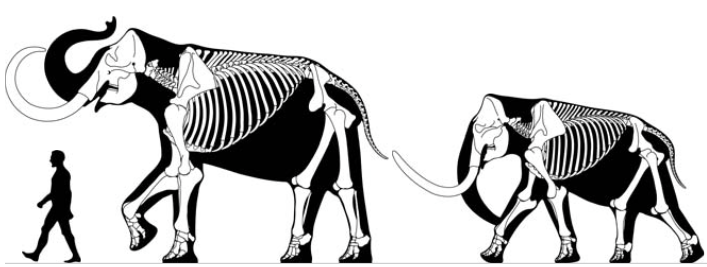
Woolly mammoths (M. primigenius), including one of the largest, the Siegsdorf mammoth (left, around 3.49 m or 11 ft 5 in tall), and a mature Siberian bull (around 2.7 m or 8 ft 10 in tall)

The number of lamellae (ridge-like structures) on the molars, particularly on the third molars, substantially increased over the course of mammoth evolution. The earliest Eurasian species M. rumanus have around 8–10 lamellae on the third molars, while Late Pleistocene woolly mammoths have 20–28 lamellae on the third molars. These changes also corresponded with reduced enamel thickness and increasing tooth height (hypsodonty). These changes are thought to be adaptations to increasing abrasion resulting from the shift in the diet of mammoths from a browsing based diet in M. rumanus, towards a grazing diet in later species.

Molars

Diagram of the upper (occlusal) surface of a mammoth molar (probably that of a woolly mammoth)

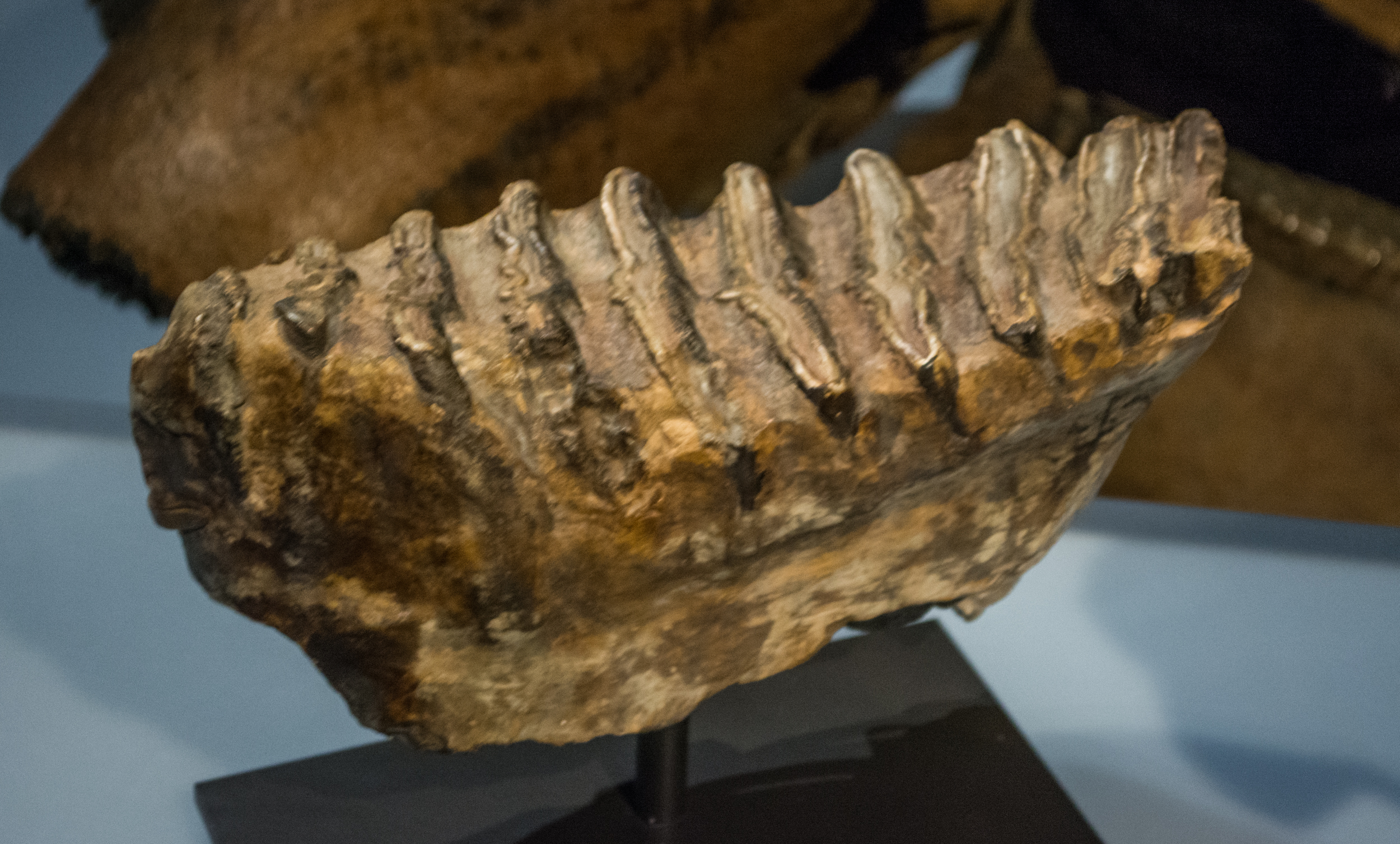
Molar of Mammuthus meridionalis

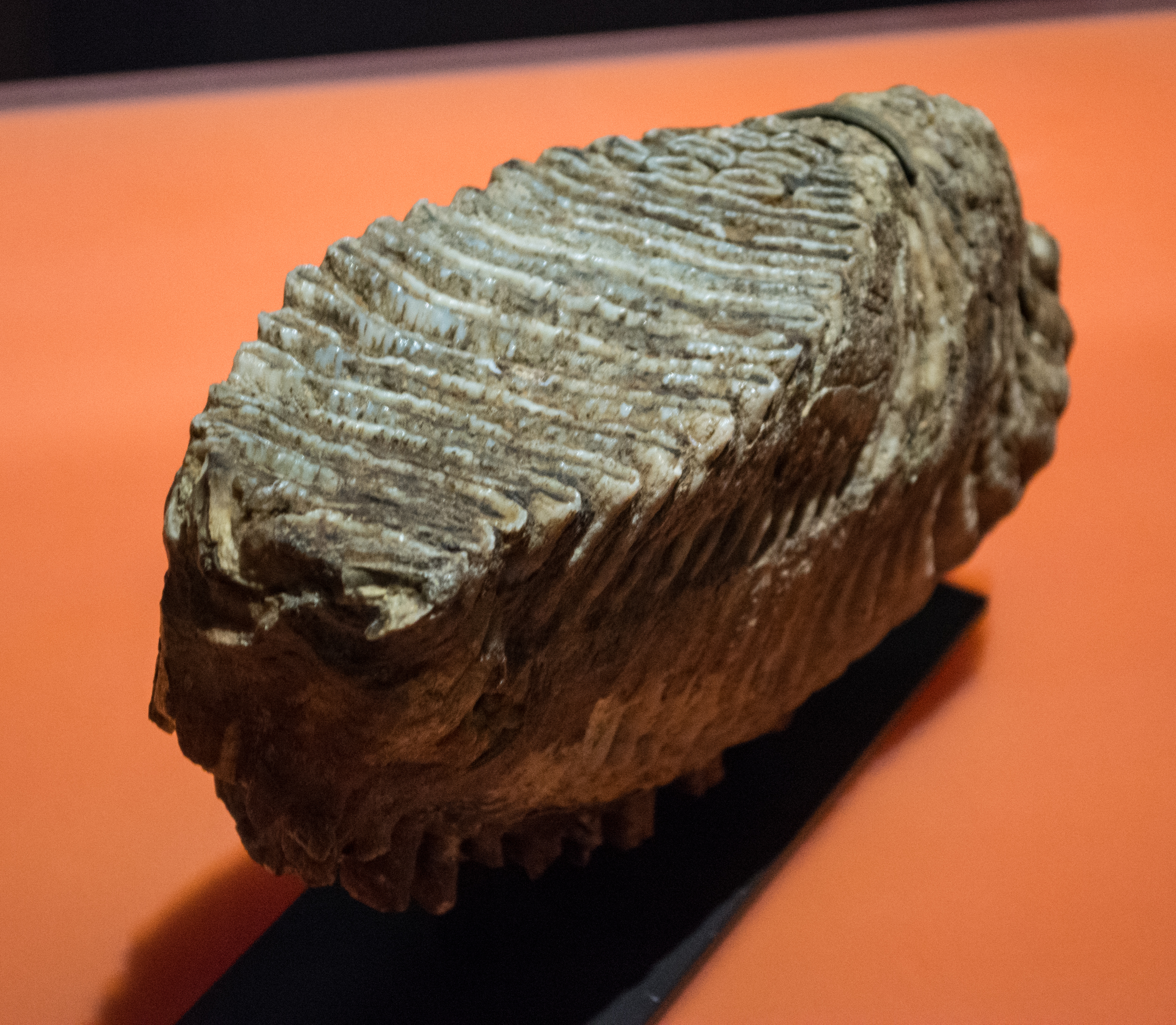
Molar of a woolly mammoth (Mammuthus primigenius)

Both sexes bore tusks. A first, small set appeared at about the age of six months, and these were replaced at about 18 months by the permanent set. Growth of the permanent set was at a rate of about 2.5 to 15 cm (1 to 6 in) per year. The tusks display a strong spiral twisting. Mammoth tusks are among the largest known among proboscideans with some specimens over 4 m (13 ft) in length and likely 200 kg (440 lb) in weight with some historical reports suggesting tusks of Columbian mammoths could reach lengths of around 5 m (16 ft), substantially surpassing the largest known modern elephant tusks.

The heads of mammoths were prominently domed. The first several thoracic vertebrae of mammoths typically had long neural spines. The back was typically sloping, with the body being wider than that of African elephants. The tails of mammoths were relatively short compared to living elephants.

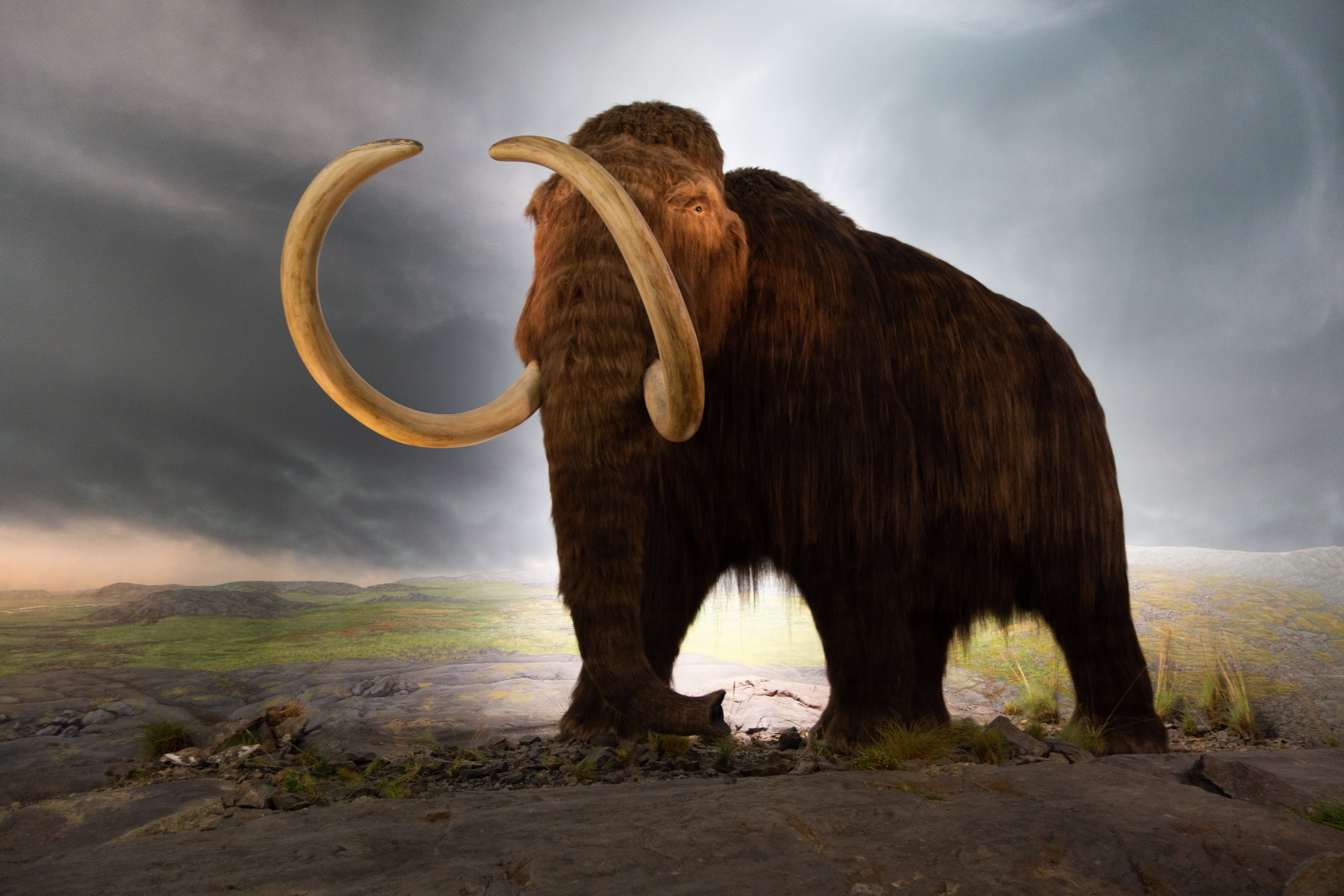
Life restoration of a woolly mammoth at Royal BC Museum

While early mammoth species like M. meridionalis were probably relatively hairless, similar to modern elephants, M. primigenius and likely M. trogontherii had a substantial coat of fur, among other physiological adaptations for living in cold environments. Genetic sequencing of M. trogontherii-like mammoths, over 1 million years old from Siberia suggests that they had already developed many of the genetic changes found in woolly mammoths responsible for tolerance of cold conditions. Scientists discovered and studied the remains of a mammoth calf, and found that fat greatly influenced its form, and enabled it to store large amounts of nutrients necessary for survival in temperatures as low as −50 °C (−60 °F). The fat also allowed the mammoths to increase their muscle mass, allowing the mammoths to fight against enemies and live longer. Woolly mammoths evolved a suite of adaptations for arctic life, including morphological traits such as small ears and tails to minimize heat loss, a thick layer of subcutaneous fat, and numerous sebaceous glands for insulation, as well as a large brown-fat hump like deposit behind the neck that may have functioned as a heat source and fat reservoir during winter.

== Behaviour and palaeoecology ==
Based on studies of their close relatives, the modern elephants and mammoths probably had a gestation period of 22 months, resulting in a single calf being born. Their social structure was probably the same as that of living elephants, with females and juveniles residing in herds headed by a matriarch, whilst bulls lived solitary lives or formed loose groups after sexual maturity, with analysis of testosterone levels in tusks indicating that adult males experienced periods of musth like modern elephants, where they entered a state of heightened aggression.

The earliest mammoth species like M. subplanifrons and M. rumanus were mixed feeders (both browsing and grazing) to browsers. Throughout mammoth evolution in Eurasia, their diet shifted towards mixed feeding-grazing in M. trogontherii, culminating in the woolly mammoth, which was largely a grazer, with stomach contents of woolly mammoths suggesting that they largely fed on grass and forbs. M. columbi is thought to have been a mixed feeder.

Like living elephants, mammoth adults may have been largely invulnerable to non-human predation, though evidence has been found for the hunting of mammoth calves by predators, such as by the scimitar-toothed cat (Homotherium).

In living proboscideans, broken tusks sometimes occur during, for example, fights between males or when elephants of both sexes shove each other to reach critical resources such as water. The fracture surface of the remaining (rooted) tooth then becomes smoothed from use. It is very likely that this also occurred in extinct proboscideans such as mammoths as seen from a tusk found at Fenstanton Gravels (Cambs, UK) which still had some of the outer layers of cementum preserved and had a smooth, polished surface on an old, fractured surface ('faceting').

== Relationship with early humans ==
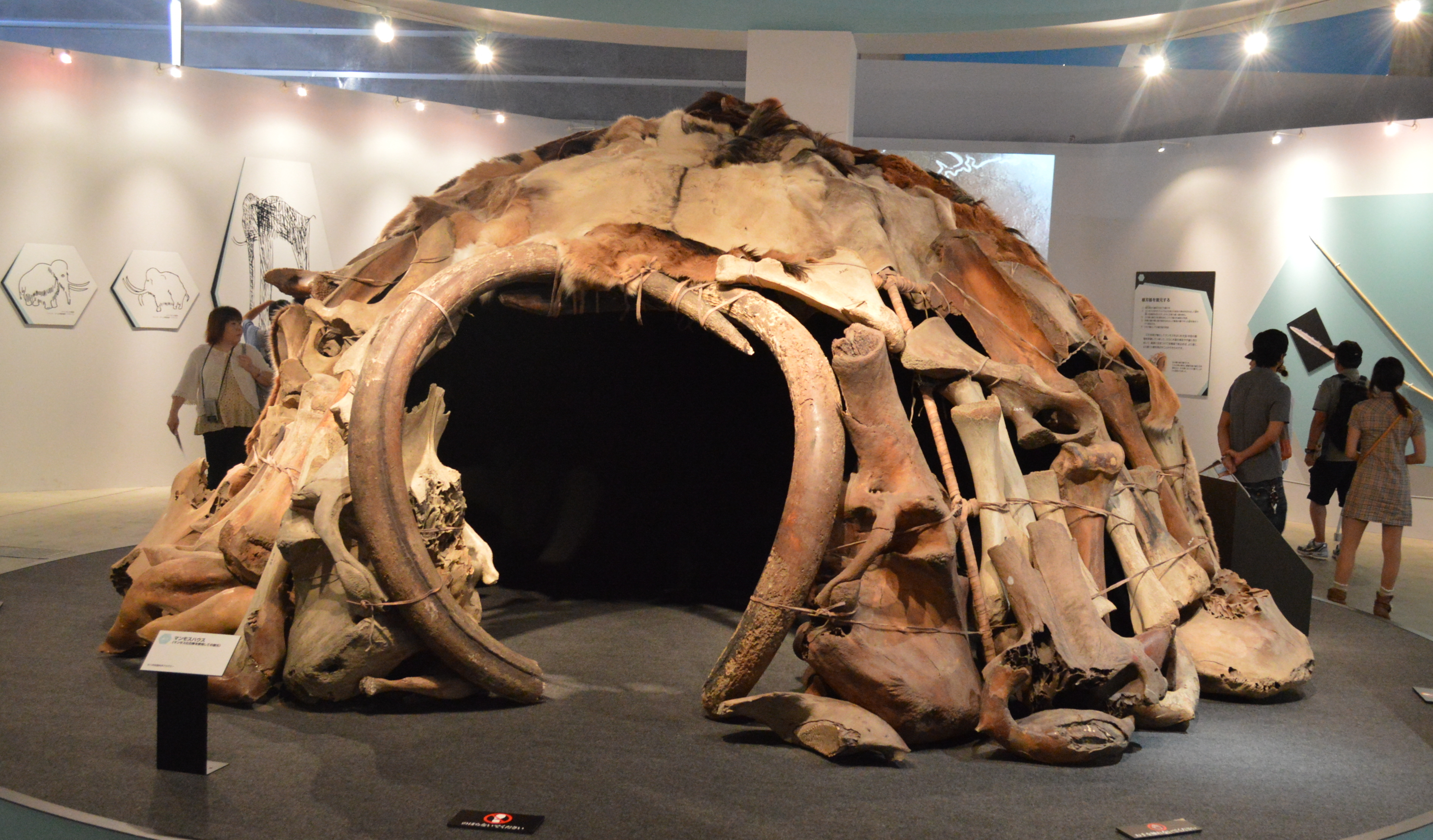
Reconstructed mammoth bone hut based on finds in Mezhyrich in Ukraine, exhibited in Japan

Evidence that humans interacted with mammoths extends back to around 1.8 million years ago. A number of bones of Mammuthus meridionalis from the Dmanisi site in Georgia have marks which suggest butchery by archaic humans, likely as a result of scavenging. During the Last Glacial Period, modern humans hunted woolly mammoths, used their remains to create art and tools, and depicted them in works of art. Woolly mammoth bones were used as construction material for dwellings by both Neanderthals and modern humans during the ice age. More than 70 such dwellings are known, mainly from the East European Plain. The huts' bases were circular, ranging from 8 to 24 m^{2} (86 to 258 sq ft). Large bones were used as foundations for the huts, tusks for the entrances, and the roofs were probably skins held in place by bones or tusks. Remains of Columbian mammoths at a number of sites suggest that they were hunted by Paleoindians, the first humans to inhabit the Americas. A probable bone engraving of a Columbian mammoth made by Paleoindians is known from Vero Beach, Florida.

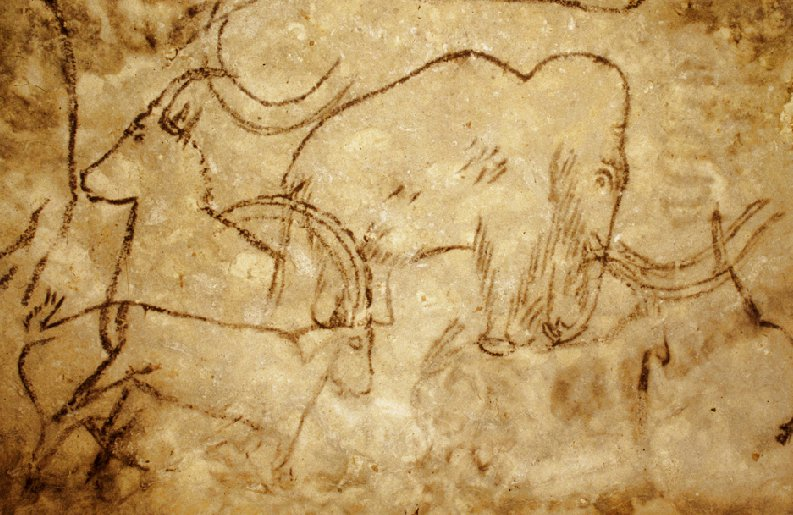
Upper Paleolithic painting of woolly mammoth from Rouffignac Cave, France

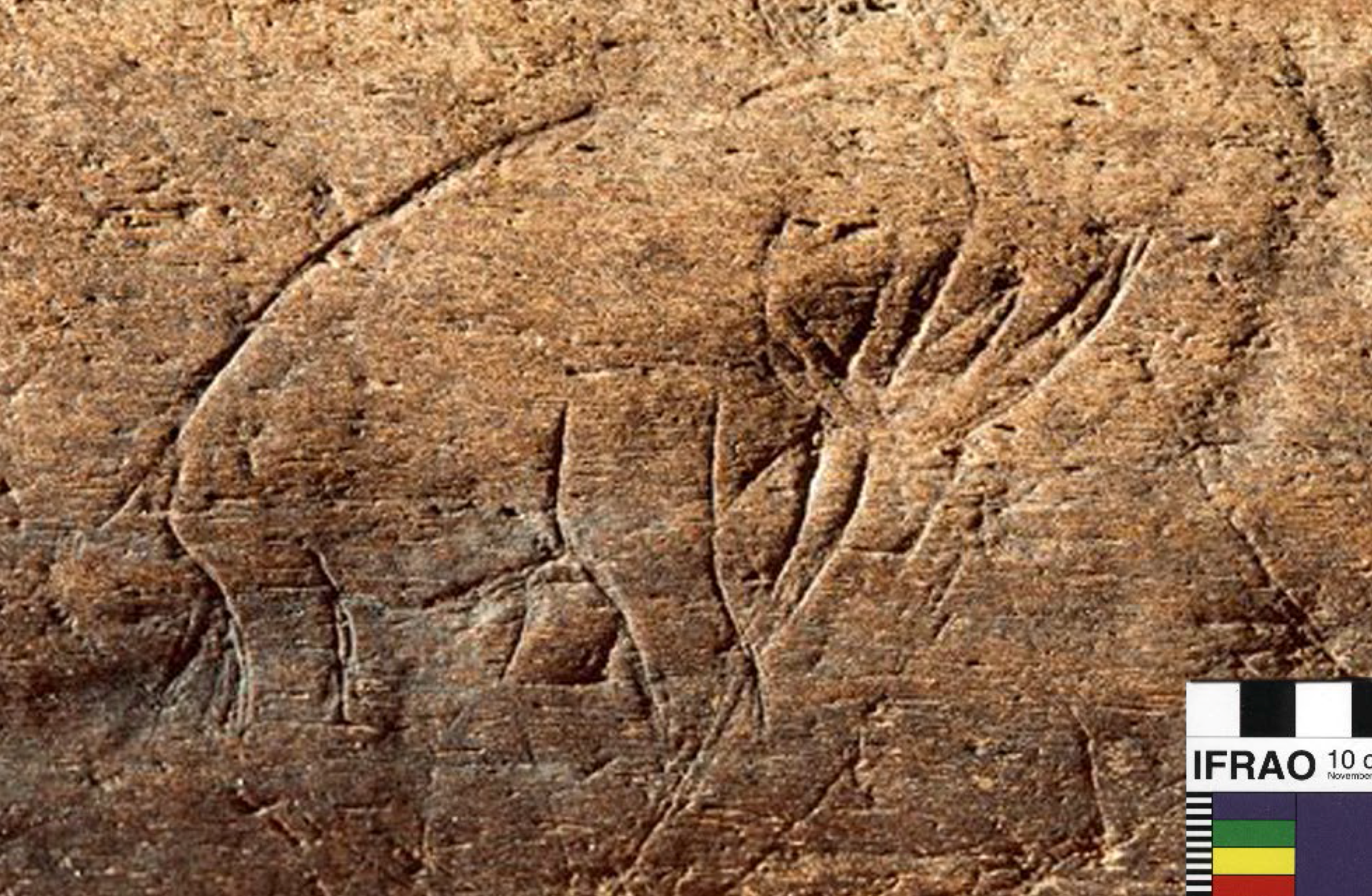
Probable engraving of a Columbian mammoth from Vero Beach, Florida

== Extinction ==
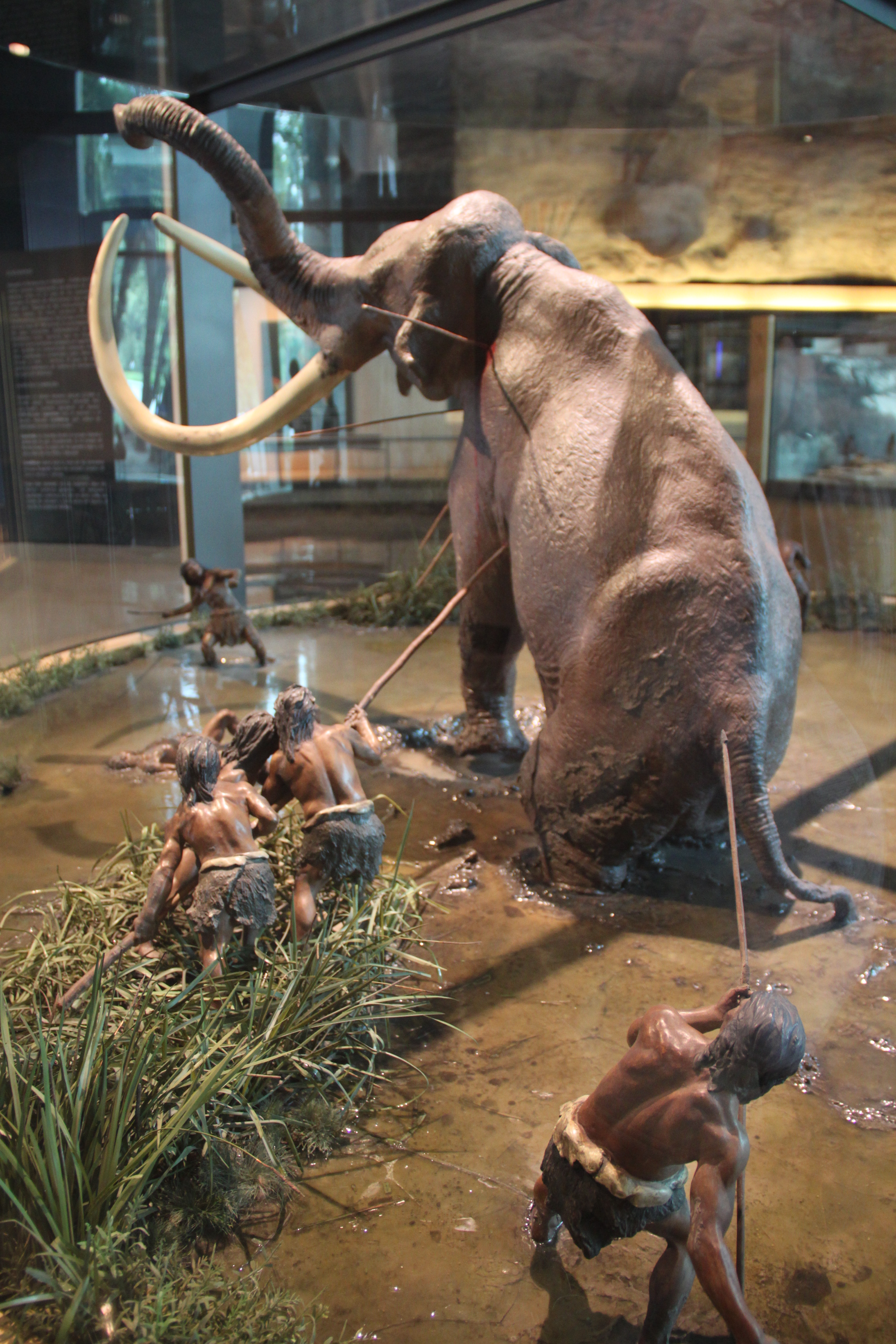
Diorama of a Paleoindian Columbian mammoth (Mammuthus columbi) hunting scene at the National Museum of Anthropology, Mexico City

Following the end of the Last Glacial Maximum, the range of the woolly mammoth began to contract, disappearing from most of Europe by 14,000 years ago. By the Younger Dryas (around 12,900-11,700 years Before Present), woolly mammoths were confined to the northernmost regions of Siberia. This contraction is suggested to have been caused by the warming induced expansion of unfavourable wet tundra and forest environments at the expense of the preferred dry open mammoth steppe, with the possible additional pressure of human hunting. The last woolly mammoths in mainland Siberia became extinct around 10,000 years ago, during the early Holocene. The final extinction of mainland woolly mammoths may have been driven by human hunting. Relict populations survived on Saint Paul island in the Bering Strait until around 5,600 years ago, with their extinction likely due to the degradation of freshwater sources, and on Wrangel Island off the coast of Northeast Siberia until around 4,000 years ago.

The last reliable dates of the Columbian mammoth date to around 12,500 years ago. Columbian mammoths became extinct as part of the end-Pleistocene extinction event where most large mammals across the Americas became extinct approximately simultaneously at the end of the Late Pleistocene. Hunting of Columbian mammoths by Paleoindians may have been a contributory factor in their extinction. The timing of the extinction of the dwarf Sardinian mammoth Mammuthus lamarmorai is difficult to constrain precisely, though the youngest specimen likely dates to sometime around 57–29,000 years ago. The youngest records of the pygmy mammoth (Mammuthus exillis) date to around 13,000 years ago, coinciding with the reducing of the area of the Californian Channel Islands as a result of rising sea level, the earliest known humans in the Channel Islands, and climatic change resulting in the decline of the previously dominant conifer forest ecosystems and expansion of scrub and grassland.

== See also ==
- Ivory trade
- La Brea Tar Pits
- List of mammoths
- The Mammoth Site in Hot Springs, South Dakota
- Niederweningen Mammoth Museum
- Pleistocene Park
- Waco Mammoth National Monument
