= Mammuthus subplanifrons =

Mammuthus subplanifrons Temporal range: Late Miocene-Early Pliocene 6.2–3.75 Ma

Scientific classification
- Kingdom: Animalia
- Phylum: Chordata
- Class: Mammalia
- Order: Proboscidea
- Family: Elephantidae
- Genus: †Mammuthus
- Species: †M. subplanifrons

Binomial name
- †Mammuthus subplanifrons (Osborn, 1928)

Synonyms
- Archidiskodon planifrons Osborn, 1928

Extinct species of mammal

Mammuthus subplanifrons is the oldest representative of the genus Mammuthus, known from around 6.2-3.75 million years ago during the late Miocene-early Pliocene in what is today South Africa and countries of East Africa, especially Ethiopia, as well as possibly central Africa. They already presented some of the unique characteristics of mammoths, like the spirally, twisting tusks.

== Taxonomy ==
M. subplanifrons has been described as having a "slightly tortuous" taxonomic history. The species was first named as Archidiskodon subplanifrons by Henry Fairfield Osborn in 1928 (Archidiskodon was historically used primarily, but not exclusively for species now placed in Mammuthus). The type specimen is a partial lower third molar (MMK 3920) collected from the Vaal River in South Africa. However, it has been subsequently argued that this specimen does not actually belong to Mammuthus, but instead is actually a specimen of Loxodonta (likely Loxodonta cookei), and thus a neotype should be selected that actually belongs to Mammuthus. It has been suggested that as currently recognised, the species is effectively a wastebasket taxon. The species is primarily known from dental remains. A 2016 study attributed the skull and partial skeleton KNM-KP 385 to the species, but this in error and actually represents the holotype skeleton of Loxodonta adaurora. In 2009, it was suggested that Loxodonta adaurora is indistinguishable from Mammuthus subplanifrons. However, other authors have continued to regard the species as distinct, and contend that the similarities between the two species are superficial.

== Description ==
The species is almost entirely known from dental remains and no skulls have been found. A lower jaw attributed to the species (SAM-PQ-L 12723), from Langebaanweg in South Africa has a long and slender corpus (the front horizontal part which contains the teeth). The front of the lower jaw where the two halves of the jaw fuse (mandibular symphysis) is broken, but when complete was clearly quite elongate, though there is no evidence of lower tusks. The mandibular ramus (the back part of the mandible where it articulates with the skull) is relatively high. The third molars of M. subplanifrons have nine plates. The molar tooth wear shows a loop pattern and do not show loxodont (diamond-shaped) morphology. Tusks attributed to the species suggest that they were twisted like later mammoth species.

== Distribution and chronology ==
Specimens have been reported from South Africa, Kenya, Ethiopia, Malawi, and possibly Uganda and the Democratic Republic of the Congo, spanning from around 6.2 to 3.75 million years ago. Specimens intermediate between M. subplanifrons and the later species Mammuthus africanavus have been reported from the Late Pliocene Hadar Formation, Ethiopia, dating to around 3.5 million years ago.

== Ecology ==
Isotope analysis of specimens from the Varswater Formation in South Africa suggests that M. subplanifrons was a flexible feeder.
