= Earthshot Prize =

Environmental initiative prize

- Awarded for: Solutions to climate change and environmental issues from 2021 to 2030
- Location: Kensington Palace; Palace Green; London, England W8 4PU
- Country: United Kingdom
- Presented by: The Royal Foundation (2021); The Earthshot Prize Foundation (2022–present)
- Reward: £1 million per winner
- First award: 2021
- Website: earthshotprize.org

The Earthshot Prize is a global environmental prize that is awarded to five winners each year for their contributions towards environmentalism. It was first awarded in 2021 and is planned to be awarded annually until 2030. Each winner receives a grant of £1 million to continue their environmental work. The five categories were inspired by the UN Sustainable Development Goals; they are 'restoration and protection of nature', 'air cleanliness', 'ocean revival', 'waste-free living' and 'climate action'.

The prize was launched in 2020 by Prince William and the biologist and natural historian David Attenborough. The winners are selected by the Earthshot Prize Council.

== Background and launch ==
Prince William, Duke of Cambridge announced the Earthshot Prize on 31 December 2019, after two years of development. The prize will be awarded annually from 2021 to 2030 to five individuals or organisations who create impactful and sustainable solutions addressing the planet's environmental challenges. William stated that he felt responsibility to establish the prize as Earth was at a "tipping point" and cited the work of his grandfather Prince Philip, Duke of Edinburgh, his father Charles, Prince of Wales, and the broadcaster David Attenborough as inspiring influences. The prize's name is inspired by the former American president John F. Kennedy's Moonshot.

William and Attenborough formally launched in October 2020, with a prize budget of £50 million over the next decade. To commemorate the launch William gave a Ted Talk discussing climate change and encouraged world leaders to take action. The pair appeared together in the ITV documentary A Planet For Us All (2020), which detailed the importance of environmental work and discussed the new prize.

== Management and funding ==
The project is funded by donations from philanthropists and charitable organisations including: Aga Khan Development Network, Bloomberg Philanthropies, DP World in partnership with Dubai Expo 2020, the Jack Ma Foundation, the World Wide Fund for Nature, Greenpeace, Marc Benioff, and the Bezos Earth Fund. Jason Knauf, who had earlier been chief executive of the Royal Foundation, took over as the programme's CEO in April 2025, replacing Hannah Jones.

The prize became an independent charity in July 2022 after being a part of the Royal Foundation for two years. Christiana Figueres, David Fein, Tokunboh Ishamael, M. Sanjayan, Jason Knauf, Zoë Ware and Jean-Christophe Gray were also appointed to the board of trustees in the same month. The former prime minister of New Zealand, Jacinda Ardern, joined the board in April 2023. Jesper Brodin succeeded Christiana Figueres as chair of the board in March 2026.

In February 2026, the Charity Commission was reported to have received a complaint from the Republic over the Earthshot Prize's links to DP World and its executive chairman and CEO Sultan Ahmed bin Sulayem, following revelations about bin Sulayem in the Epstein files. That month, bin Sulayem resigned as DP World's CEO.

== Categories and nomination process ==
A £1 million prize will be awarded annually between 2021 and 2030 to a winner in each of the following five categories:

- Protect and Restore Nature
- Clean Our Air
- Revive Our Oceans
- Build a Waste-Free World
- Fix Our Climate

In September 2023, ahead of the second Earthshot Prize Innovation Summit in New York City, the animal rights and climate activist, Genesis Butler, partnered with Generation Vegan to request the Prince of Wales to add an "Advance a Plant-Based Food System" category, matching the sum that the other five category winners receive.

Each area is supported by the UN Sustainable Development Goals and scientifically agreed international measures. Submissions are open to any individual, team, organisation, or government with workable solutions. The Earthshot Prize Council is responsible for determining a winner from each category every year. There is a five-stage process to select a winner for each Earthshot, designed alongside the Centre for Public Impact. Nominations are screened with an independent assessment process run by Deloitte. A panel of experts then make recommendations to the Prize Council, who select the final winners, narrowed from fifteen finalists. Shortlisted finalists will also receive resources for "tailored support" and connections with organisations to expand their work.

=== Earthshot Prize Council ===
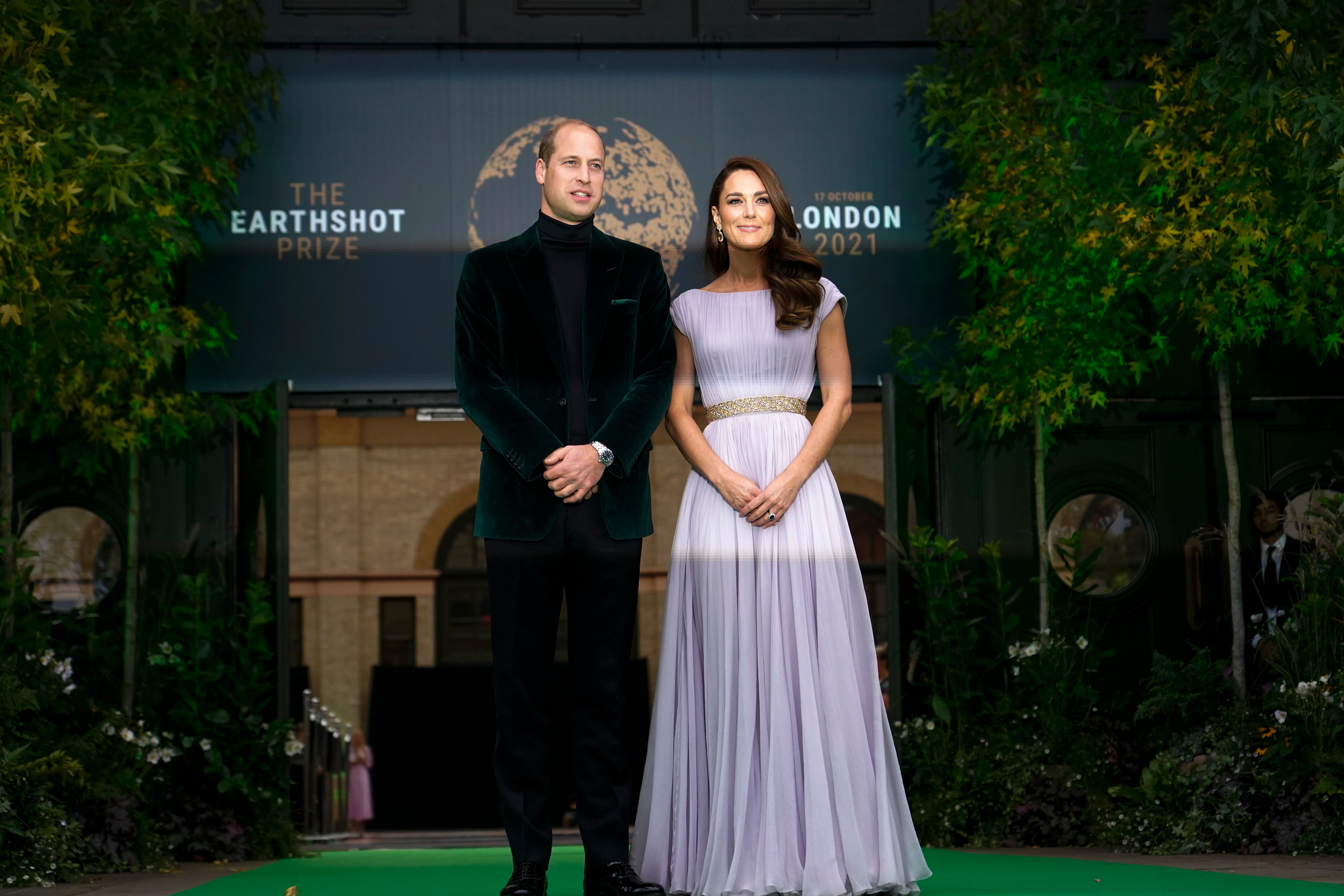
Prince William and his wife, Catherine, at the inaugural Earthshot Prize ceremony in October 2021 in London

The Earthshot Prize Council comprises global ambassadors from a range of sectors dedicated towards positive action in the environmental space. The thirteen members are Prince William, Queen Rania of Jordan, the actress Cate Blanchett, Ernest Gibson, the environmental activist Hindou Oumarou Ibrahim, the business executive Indra Nooyi, the climate activist Luisa Neubauer, the former astronaut Naoko Yamazaki, the economist Ngozi Okonjo-Iweala, the fashion designer Stella McCartney, the chef and restaurateur José Andrés, the environmentalist Wanjira Mathai, the indigenous activist Nemonte Nenquimo, and the supermodel Gisele Bündchen who select the winners in a judging session led by Christiana Figueres. David Attenborough is an emeritus member of the council. Former members include the footballer Dani Alves, the singer Shakira, the businessman Jack Ma and the basketball executive Yao Ming. Luisa Neubauer and Ernest Gibson were announced as new members of the council in May 2021. Michael Bloomberg was named as a global adviser to the winners of the prize in September that year. The conservationist and television presenter Robert Irwin and the actress Nomzamo Mbatha were named as global ambassadors of the prize in September 2024.

A book entitled Earthshot: How To Save Our Planet was written to accompany the prizes, written by Colin Butfield and Jonnie Hughes, with contributions from several of the judges. Butfield and Hughes also produced an accompanying five-part BBC One TV series about the project. The book was published in the UK, Europe and across the Commonwealth on 30 September 2021, and in the US on 5 October. The five-part series titled The Earthshot Prize: Repairing Our Planet was broadcast by BBC One in the first two weeks of October and available for streaming on BBC iPlayer and Discovery+. The miniseries consisted of documentary style episodes, each based on the five UN Sustainable Development Goals, and were presented by William and David Attenborough. In December 2024, William appeared in a documentary titled The Earthshot Report, produced by the BBC Studios and presented by the actress Hannah Waddingham, which underscored the impact and progress of the Prize's finalists.

=== Earthshot Prize Global Alliance ===
It was announced in September 2021 that the Earthshot Prize Global Alliance—consisting of companies such as Arup, Bloomberg L.P., Deloitte, Herbert Smith Freehills, Hitachi, the INGKA Group, Microsoft, MultiChoice, Natura & Co, Safaricom, Salesforce, Unilever, Vodacom, and Walmart—will help "scale up" ideas submitted by the inaugural 15 finalists. British Airways joined the alliance in September 2024. The Bezos Earth Fund announced in February 2026 that it would be providing $4.8 million to back 48 projects in total over the course of three years from the pool nominees for the Earthshot Prize.

A nine-month Fellowship Programme was launched in 2022 to help the finalists develop more ideas by forming partnerships with various businesses and organisations that are part of the Earthshot Prize Global Alliance. Since 2022, the prize has co-hosted an annual innovation summit together with Bloomberg Philanthropies.

The prize announced a two-year partnership with YouTube in May 2023, which would include "co-branded campaigns, events and creator collaborations". Prince William joined with the YouTube channel Sorted Food in July 2023 to serve veggie burgers from a food truck in London. The burgers were made and served with items sourced from the 2022 winners. The Earthshot Prize Launchpad was initiated in March 2024 as a matchmaking platform to connect Earthshot winners and innovators with investors and philanthropists.

== 2021 Award winners and nominees ==
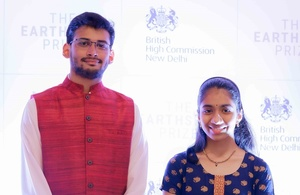
Vidyut Mohan, co-founder of the Clean our Air Prize winner (Takachar) and Vinisha Umashankar, one of the finalists in the same category (solar ironing cart), at the inaugural prize ceremony

Nominations for the inaugural prize ceremony opened on 1 November 2020, with over 100 nominating partners eligible to submit. The ceremony took place on 17 October 2021 at Alexandra Palace in London and was broadcast on Discovery+ and BBC One. Clara Amfo and Dermot O'Leary hosted the event while the awards were presented by the Duchess of Cambridge, the actresses Emma Thompson and Emma Watson, the actor David Oyelowo and the footballer Mohamed Salah. Ed Sheeran, Coldplay, KSI and Yemi Alade, and Shawn Mendes performed at the event. Sixty cyclists pedalling on bikes provided the power for music performances. None of the celebrities travelled to London by plane and the stage was built using sustainable, non-plastic materials such as recycled wood and metal. All of the guests were advised to choose environmentally appropriate outfits which included wearing clothes made from sustainable materials, such as organic cotton, recycled fabrics, and second-hand items.

15 finalists were announced on 17 September 2021, with the winners being announced on 17 October 2021.

Protect and Restore Nature
Winner: The Republic of Costa Rica, for "a scheme paying local citizens to restore natural ecosystems that has led to a revival of the rainforest."
Pole Pole Foundation (Congo), for "a community-led model of conservation that protects gorillas and local livelihoods."
Restor, Switzerland for "an online platform connecting and empowering local conservation projects."

Clean our Air
Winner: Takachar, for a "technology to create profitable products from agricultural waste and put a stop to the burning of crops."
The Blue Map App (China), for a "public environmental database enabling citizens to hold polluters to account."
Vinisha Umashankar (India), for "design[ing] a solar-powered ironing cart with the potential to improve air quality across India."

Revive our Oceans
Winner: Coral Vita (The Bahamas), for a "coral farming project designed to restore the world's dying coral reefs."
Living Seawalls (Australia), for "innovative tiles attached to sea walls, creating habitats for marine life to attach to."
Pristine Seas (Enric Sala, National Geographic Society, United States), for a "global conservation programme protecting 6.5 million square km of the world's ocean."

Build a Waste-Free World
Winner: The City of Milan Food Waste Hubs (Italy), for a "city-wide initiative that has dramatically cut waste while tackling hunger."
Sanergy, Kenya, for "a sanitation solution that converts human waste into safe products for local farmers."
WOTA BOX (Japan), for "a tiny water treatment plant that turns 98% of wastewater into clean water."

Fix our Climate
Winner: AEM Electrolyser (Thailand/Germany/Italy), for "an ingenious clean hydrogen fuel technology designed to transform how homes and buildings are powered." (Anion exchange membrane electrolysis)
Reeddi Capsules (Nigeria), for "solar-powered energy capsules making electricity affordable and accessible in energy-poor communities."
SOLbazaar (Bangladesh), for "the world's first peer-to-peer energy exchange network in a country on the front-line of climate change."

== 2022 Award winners and nominees ==
The inaugural Earthshot Prize Innovation Summit took place in New York City on 21 September 2022. The 2022 awards ceremony took place at the MGM Music Hall at Fenway in Boston on 2 December, and was broadcast in the UK on BBC One and in the US on PBS. Nominations for the second prize ceremony opened on 6 January 2022.

Fifteen finalists were announced on 4 November 2022 and the winners were revealed at the awards ceremony. They took part in the event remotely. Attenborough narrated the opening of the event and Cate Blanchett voiced a lookback at the award's inaugural winners. Clara Amfo and Daniel Dae Kim hosted the event while the awards were presented by the Princess of Wales, the footballer David Beckham, the actor Rami Malek, and the actresses Catherine O'Hara and Shailene Woodley. Billie Eilish and Finneas, Annie Lennox, Ellie Goulding, and Chloe x Halle performed at the event.

Protect and Restore Nature
Winner: Kheyti (India): a start-up that uses the "Greenhouse-in-a-Box" technique to protect small farms from the effects of climate change
Hutan (Malaysia): a research organisation aimed at creating wildlife corridors to restore natural areas and protect orangutans and other species
Desert Agricultural Transformation (China): a technique known as "desert soilization" used by Yi Zhijian and his team to transform barren desert into fertile land

Clean our Air
Winner: Mukuru Clean Stoves (Kenya): founded by Charlot Magayi, it provides cleaner burning stoves that use processed biomass to reduce indoor pollution
Ampd Enertainer (Hong Kong, China): an all-electric battery energy storage system designed by Ampd Energy to power construction sites, eliminating the need for fossil fuels
Roam (Kenya): a project aimed at making electric vehicles available in East Africa

Revive our Oceans
Winner: Indigenous Women of the Great Barrier Reef (Australia): a network of indigenous women rangers who use their knowledge and digital technologies to preserve the nature
Great Bubble Barrier (Netherlands): a team of ocean scientists, whose technique utilizes "air pumped through a perforated tube to create a curtain of bubbles", which ensures plastic ends up on the surface and goes into a waste collection system
SeaForester (Portugal): the team creates "green gravel", small stones that are seeded with seaweed spores, which are essential for capturing underwater CO_{2}

Build a Waste-Free World
Winner: Notpla (United Kingdom): the start-up produces packaging using seaweed and plants as an alternative to plastic
The City of Amsterdam (Netherlands): nominated for their efforts to create a circular economy
Fleather (India): a leather made of floral waste by Phool, an Indian company

Fix our Climate
Winner: 44.01 (Oman): eliminates CO_{2} by mineralising it in peridotite
LanzaTech (United States): the company uses gas fermentation technology to reduce pollution
Low Carbon Materials (United Kingdom): the company aims at making zero carbon concrete blocks using OSTO, a carbon-negative alternative to traditional aggregate

== 2023 Award winners and nominees ==
The second Earthshot Prize Innovation Summit took place in New York City on 19 September 2023 where the fifteen finalists of the 2023 prize were announced. The 2023 awards ceremony took place at the Mediacorp Theatre in Singapore on 7 November. The event was a part of the inaugural Earthshot Week, which began on 6 November and saw global leaders, businesses and investors meet with the Earthshot Prize winners and finalists. In August that year, celebrities including Olivia Colman, Dame Emma Thompson, and Chris Packham signed a letter urging Prince William to add a vegan category, warning that without a transition to plant-based diets the planet cannot be preserved. The actress Hannah Waddingham and the actor Sterling K. Brown hosted the awards ceremony while the pop stars Bastille, OneRepublic and Bebe Rexha gave musical performances. The actress Cate Blanchett presented one of the awards while the actress Lana Condor, the wildlife conservationist Robert Irwin, and the actors Nomzamo Mbatha and Donnie Yen took turns introducing the winners of the other categories.

Protect and Restore Nature
Winner: Accion Andina (Peru): a project working across South America to protect native forest ecosystems across the Andes
Freetown the Tree Town (Sierra Leone): an initiative by the Freetown City Council to increase and preserve tree population
Belterra (Brazil): a company that works in partnership with farmers to regenerate degraded lands via new agricultural practices

Clean our Air
Winner: GRST (Hong Kong, China): a start-up that has developed a new process for making and recycling lithium-ion batteries
Polish Smog Alert (Poland): a campaigning group working to encourage policy change and improve the air quality across Poland
Enso (United Kingdom): a company that has created sustainable tires for electric vehicles with hopes of reducing tire and air pollution

Revive our Oceans
Winner: WildAid Marine Program (global): a non-profit that allows data sharing to conserve the oceans
Abalobi (South Africa): an organization that guides small fishing communities towards sustainability by providing relevant data
Coastal 500 (global): an international network involving mayors and local leaders aimed at improving and protecting ocean habitats

Build a Waste-Free World
Winner: S4S Technologies (India): a start-up that uses its solar powered dehydration equipment to reduce food waste and help farmers process excess crops into products with a longer shelf lives
Circ Inc. (United States): a company that has developed a way of recycling polycotton back to its raw materials so that it can be reused and reduce textile waste
Colorifix (United Kingdom): a company that creates sustainable pigments and dyes from natural resources to reduce water and chemical waste in the fashion industry

Fix our Climate
Winner: Boomitra (global): a company that tries to reduce emissions by creating a soil carbon marketplace to restore lands
Sea Forest (Australia): a company that has created a seaweed-based livestock feed which would reduce methane emissions from ruminant animals"
Aquacycl (United States): a company that uses microbial technology to make treating industrial wastewater more cost-effective and accessible, more efficient and less polluting

== 2024 Award winners and nominees ==
The 2024 awards ceremony took place in Cape Town, South Africa, on 6 November. The finalists for the prize were announced in September 2024 at the Earthshot Prize Innovation Summit held in New York City. The singer and actor Billy Porter and the television presenter Bonang Matheba hosted the awards ceremony while the television presenters Ebuka Obi-Uchendu and Nomuzi Mabena hosted the Green Carpet. Davido, Diamond Platnumz, Lebo M, the Ndlovu Youth Choir, and Uncle Waffles gave musical performances. The models Heidi Klum and Winnie Harlow, the actresses Nina Dobrev and Nomzamo Mbatha, the wildlife conservationist Robert Irwin, and the rapper Tobe Nwigwe took turns in introducing the winners of the five categories.

On 4 November, Prince William met with young environmentalists upon arriving in Cape Town as part of the prize's inaugural Climate Leaders Youth Program. The winners were announced at the awards ceremony on 6 November.

Protect and Restore Nature
Winner: Altyn Dala Conservation Initiative (Kazakhstan): an organisation responsible for saving the Saiga antelope from extinction
Amazon Sacred Headwaters Alliance (Ecuador): an alliance of multiple nations to protect 86 million acres of the Amazon rainforest
NatureMetrics (United Kingdom): A worldwide start-up specialising in environmental DNA (eDNA) sampling, aiming to make biodiversity monitoring easy and accessible for all.

Clean our Air
Winner: GAYO (Ghana): an organisation focused on transforming waste management practices across Africa by encouraging behavioural change through its “zero waste model.”
d.light (Pan-Africa): a company offering affordable and sustainable solar home systems that deliver electricity, replacing harmful kerosene lamps and inefficient cooking stoves.
MYCL (Indonesia): a company addressing the issues of crop-waste burning and the detrimental production of leather, both of which contribute to air pollution and adversely affect the quality of life

Revive our Oceans
Winner: High Ambition Coalition for Nature and People (global): an alliance comprising 119 nations dedicated to safeguarding terrestrial and marine environments by focusing on identifying gaps in technology, finance, and knowledge, while also facilitating connections between governments and sources of technical support and funding
MiAlgae (United Kingdom): a company providing a circular economy approach to address the challenge of obtaining marine Omega-3s from fish oil, a process that necessitates the capture of wild fish to sustain aquaculture
Coast 4C (Philippines): a social enterprise with the objective of establishing the largest supply of regenerative seaweed globally, thereby providing advantages to underprivileged coastal fishing communities

Build a Waste-Free World
Winner: Keep It Cool (Kenya): a company addressing challenges related to effective refrigeration and cold-chain logistics throughout Africa by providing solar-powered refrigeration solutions and linking smallholder farmers and fishers to a centralized online marketplace
Natural Fiber Welding (United States): a company specialising in the development of biodegradable natural fibers and ingredients designed to serve as alternatives to plastics, with extensive applications across various sectors including fashion, footwear, automotive, and beyond
Ferment'Up (France): a company that specialises in the upcycling of skins and seeds derived from fruits and vegetables, employing a dry fermentation process to transform food waste into valuable ingredients

Fix our Climate
Winner: Advanced Thermovoltaic Systems (United States): a company which harnesses surplus heat generated from heavy industrial activities, such as cement and steel production, and transforms this waste heat into electrical energy
Equatic (United States): a company employing a method known as seawater electrolysis to extract carbon dioxide from the ocean at a rate more efficient than natural processes
Build Up Nepal (Nepal): a social enterprise that has created a brick designed to withstand earthquakes, which produces 75% fewer carbon emissions than conventional clay-fired bricks

== 2025 Award winners and nominees ==
The 2025 awards ceremony took place at the Museum of Tomorrow in Rio de Janeiro, Brazil on 5 November. It was hosted by the broadcaster Luciano Huck. Anitta, Gilberto Gil, Kylie Minogue, Seu Jorge, and Shawn Mendes gave musical performances. The footballer Cafu, the gymnast Rebeca Andrade, the racing driver Sebastian Vettel, and the environmental activist Txai Suruí took turns in introducing the winners of the five categories.

The finalists were announced on 4 October 2025.

Protect and Restore Nature
Winner: re.green (Brazil): a company that uses AI and satellite data to restore Brazil’s Atlantic Forest, having planted millions of trees and created jobs while protecting biodiversity.
Tropical Forest Forever Facility (Brazil): an organisation that has launched a $125 billion fund to pay countries for safeguarding tropical forests, aiming to protect over a billion hectares by 2030.
Tenure Facility (Sweden): an organisation that supports Indigenous, Afro-descendant, and local communities to secure legal land rights, having helped protect millions of hectares of forest.

Clean our Air
Winner: The City of Bogotá (Colombia): a city that has reduced air pollution by 24% since 2018 through cleaner transport, greening, and urban design for 8 million residents.
The City of Guangzhou (China): a city that transformed urban mobility by electrifying buses and taxis, cutting PM2.5 levels by 40% for 24 million citizens.
The State of Gujarat (India): a state that pioneered a particulate emissions trading scheme, reducing pollution while allowing industrial growth.

Revive our Oceans
Winner: High Seas Treaty (The Netherlands): a treaty that protects biodiversity in international waters, signed by over 145 countries and entering into force in 2026.
Bonds for Ocean Conservation (United States): an organisation that has enabled debt-for-nature swaps, redirecting over $1.4 billion into marine conservation and protecting millions of km² of ocean.
Matter (United Kingdom): a company that provides self-cleaning filters that have already captured microplastics from homes and factories across 30 European markets.

Build a Waste-Free World
Winner: Lagos Fashion Week (Nigeria): an organisation that promotes sustainable fashion, having trained designers and revived local craftsmanship across Africa.
ATRenew (China): a company that has processed 150 million electronics, making second-hand devices desirable and reducing e-waste globally.
Quay Quarter Tower (Australia): a building that exemplifies upcycling and retrofitting, having retained most of its structure and cut thousands of tonnes of carbon.

Fix our Climate
Winner: Friendship (Bangladesh): an organisation that provides healthcare, education, and climate resilience, having restored mangroves and reached millions of people.
Barbados: a country that has reshaped climate finance through the Bridgetown Initiative, securing debt relief and directing billions into climate projects.
Form Energy (United States): a company that provides iron-air batteries, having built its first factory and creating hundreds of green jobs for renewable energy storage.

== 2026 Award winners and nominees ==
In February 2026, Prince William announced in a video message that the sixth Earthshot Prize awards ceremony would be held in Mumbai, India, that November.

The finalists were announced on 18 September 2026. The ceremony was held on 17 November at the Jio World Convention Centre and hosted by Karan Johar.

The Princess of Wales, actors Rami Malek, Alia Bhatt and Sonam Kapoor, and the cricketer Sachin Tendulkar were the presenters, whereas Take That, Shreya Ghoshal and Simone Ashley gave live performances. The ceremony will also be livestreamed in more than 240 countries through Amazon Prime Video. The inaugural Children's Earthshot was held on 17 November to recognise environmental innovators aged 9 to 17.

Protect and Restore Nature
Winner: The Kingdom of Bhutan: a country that protects more than half its territory and maintains nearly 70% forest cover, while pursuing large-scale forest restoration.
Yellowstone to Yukon (Canada, U.S.): a conservation initiative connecting and protecting wildlife habitat across the Rocky Mountains, including through land conservation and wildlife crossings.
Indigenous Desert Alliance (Australia): an alliance supporting Indigenous ranger groups in managing and protecting Australia's desert landscapes through traditional knowledge and conservation practices.

Fix our Climate
Winner: Ørsted: a renewable-energy company developing offshore wind projects and transitioning energy systems away from fossil fuels.
Mahila Housing Trust (India): an organisation helping low-income communities adapt to climate change, including through climate-resilient housing and urban programmes benefiting women.
Pula (Kenya): an agricultural technology company providing smallholder farmers with affordable crop insurance and climate-risk protection.

Revive our Oceans
Winner: Niue Ocean Wide Trust (Niue): an organisation financing permanent protection of Niue's ocean through Ocean Conservation Commitments, with 40% of its waters designated as a no-take marine area.
ZEMBA: an alliance of major cargo owners making long-term commitments to zero-emission shipping, helping create demand for cleaner ships and fuels.
The City of Barcelona (Spain): a city transforming its Mar Bella waterfront by restoring coastline and creating climate-resilient public space designed to protect the coast from storms and rising seas.

Build a Waste-Free World
Winner: PFAS-Free France (France): a campaign that helped secure France's 2025 law restricting PFAS, or “forever chemicals”, in everyday products.
Korea Zero Waste Movement Network (South Korea): a movement that helped develop South Korea's national system for separating and recycling food waste instead of sending it to landfill.
Mother Earth Foundation (Philippines): an organisation helping communities establish zero-waste systems that separate, compost and recycle waste while reducing plastic pollution.

Clean our Air
Winner: Mahindra Last Mile Mobility (India): a manufacturer of electric three-wheelers that has helped accelerate the transition to electric transport in India's last-mile mobility sector.
AirQo (Africa): a platform using low-cost air-quality monitors and artificial intelligence to track pollution across African cities and help communities and governments act on it.
Satellites on Fire (Argentina): an AI-powered wildfire detection platform using satellite imagery to detect fires faster and send real-time alerts to responders.

== See also ==
- List of environmental awards
