= Ampd (disambiguation) =

Ampd or AMPD may refer to:

- Ampd Energy
- Amp'd Mobile
- Alternative DSM-5 model for personality disorders (AMPD)
