= Dynaxity =

Combination of dynamics and complexity

Dynaxity is a compound word of dynamics and complexity. The term describes the combination of dynamics and complexity. It was invented in the late 1980s and was initially published and used by Rieckmann. The term was used by many authors, i.a. by Henning and Tiltmann.

The term was developed from practical experiences in managing complex systems in companies and organizations and describes the simultaneous increase of complexity and dynamics as well as the implications for the perception, diagnosis and management of such.

In general, four different zones can be distinguished: static, dynamic, turbulent and chaotic. These four zones correspond to the different degrees of Dynaxity.

== The four zones of Dynaxity ==
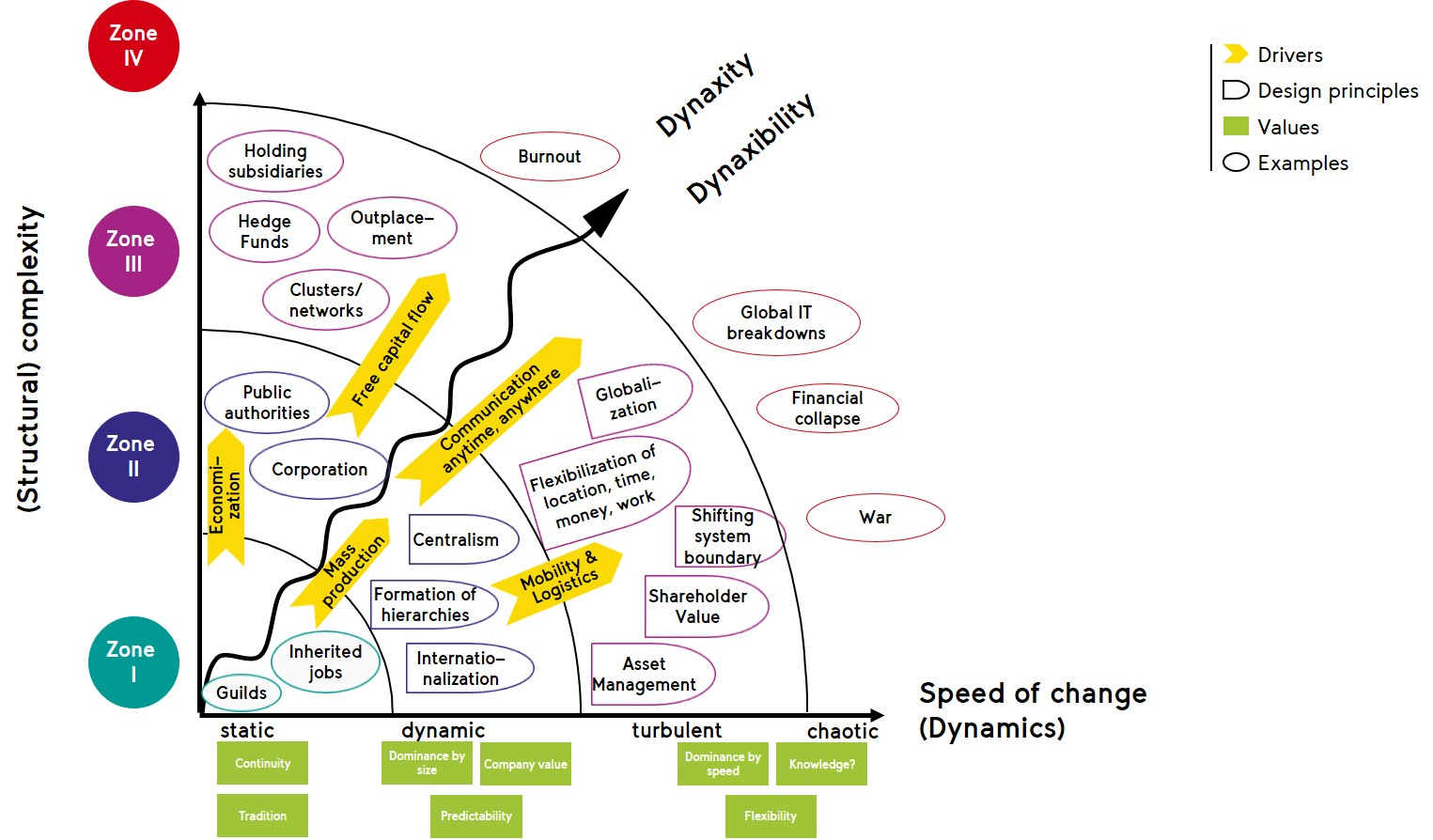
Graphical representation of the four zones of Dynaxity

=== Zone 1: static ===
Zone 1 is defined by quasi-static conditions. Simple, fixed, absolute rules, constant operating structures over generations and secured markets are conditions for low Dynaxity.

=== Zone 2: dynamic ===
Zone 2 is the normal case for most companies: Changing markets, continuous growth, streamlined processes and structures, high efforts in planning, general controllability of the company by means of the so-called "machine model". Data- and fact orientation, handbooks, norms and standards shape the working environment as well as task specialization. Decisions are usually made centrally and task overlap is avoided. Mental and manual work is usually separated, as well as the execution and control of work. The environment - and therefore also the customer - usually appears as a "disturbance variable".

=== Zone 3: turbulent ===
With increasing Dynaxity, the "turbululent zone" 3 is established. In principle, the management of systems in zone 3 is possible, but with different methods. The "mechanistic" approach fails. The system has to be considered a living system instead, which is dominated by people, their working and living processes as well as their (partly) autonomous decision-making on objectives. Systems in zone 3 have a high momentum, which is reinforced by the pressure of external turbulences from the market. They are characterized by strong feedback processes - the solution of a problem often creates multiple new problems. High redundancy is another characteristic of those systems.

=== Zone 4: chaotic ===
The general controllability of systems with high Dynaxity, as it is the case in zone 4, is not given anymore. Zone 4 describes those states, in which extremely high complexity and dynamics are predominant and the direction of the events cannot be controlled anymore. Typical examples are civil wars, natural disasters, as well as psychotic conditions of people or systems.

== Application ==
It is obvious that for managing systems, zone 3 is the targeted dimension for many companies and organizations. There are two cases to be distinguished:

a. An organization needs to change from zone 2 to zone 3, due to increasingly turbulent markets.

b. An organization is situated in zone 4 and therefore in an uncontrollable state because of its chaotic structure, which is characterized by the absolute dominance of chaotic processes. It has to find a way to return to zone 3.

In this context Dynaxibility describes the ability to deal with Dynaxity adequately to the current zone.

Rieckman and Henning/Henning also discussed Dynaxibility in the context of ratio and emotio, especially for the factors truth and love. For the Dynaxibility in zone 3, two exposed states are revealed:

a. ''love without truth'' This state can often be observed when organizations and their teams transition from zone 2 to zone 3. To maintain the factor "security", unpleasant truths are often concealed and various "non-aggression pacts" are concluded unknowingly. Those "cuddle clubs" still feel comfortable in the context of turbulences in zone 3, but their contributions to the organization are increasingly less target-oriented. The consequences of this behavior can be simulated in a seminar environment and strategies for overcoming it can be developed.

b. ''truth without love'': The second state in zone 3 describes the process, in which emotional and/or objective psychological strain is so high, that single persons or groups "thump the truth on the table" - regardless of the emotional consequences for affected persons. Those "brutal gangs" are mainly observed in organizations when unpleasant truths are held back in order to maintain a positive working atmosphere.

As a strategy for overcoming this behavior, Henning describes the concept of "focused" synergies (business oriented familiarity / functional trust) based on the OSTO System Model. It helps with designing team development processes in zone 3 in a way, that people and teams work in a balance between truth and love.

=== Agile Manifesto ===
For the general differentiation between zone 2 and zone 3 the agile manifesto can be used. It generalizes considerations of the agile software development and contains the following four guiding principles:

- Individuals and interactions over processes and tools
- Working software over comprehensive documentation
- Customer collaboration over contract negotiation
- Responding to change over following a plan

That is, while there is value in the items on the right, we value the items on the left more. With this manifesto it is clear to see, that managing in zone 3 is about finding a balance between the principles of zone 3 (operable processes, cooperation with the customer, individuals and their interactions, reacting to change) and zone 2 (documentation, contract negotiations, tools, schedules). However, in case of doubt, the zone 3 approach should be preferred.

=== Success factors ===
Kutscha and Henning propose the following management principles that can be derived:

1. Always be aware of the situation.
2. Throw all ballast overboard.
3. Build software that is "good enough".
4. Optimize the internal processes.
5. Improve cooperation and communication.
6. Build a core-team that is 100% focused on success.
7. (continue to) Build up trust and confidence.
8. Work, work, and again work.

Later Klaus Henning added another item to those success factors: "9. Celebrating a success is an absolute must to ensure the willingness to engage oneself."
