= Environmental Media Association =

US non-profit-organization

- Type: Incentive
- Industry: Non-profit organization
- Founded: 1989; United States
- Founder: Cindy Horn; Lyn Lear
- Headquarters: Beverly Hills, California, United States
- Revenue: 1,429,661 United States dollar (2023)
- Total assets: 1,333,882 United States dollar (2023)
- Website: www.green4ema.org

The Environmental Media Association (EMA) is a non-profit organization which was founded in 1989 by Cindy Horn and Lyn Lear. EMA works with the entertainment industry to encourage green production and raise the public's environmental awareness. The group provides a "Green Seal" to productions which reduce their environmental footprint. The first movie to have the EMA Green Seal in its credits was The Incredible Hulk, which made specific efforts during its 2007 filming to cut carbon emissions and waste created during production. There are also various TV episodes, such as the Futurama episode "The Problem with Popplers", and various movies have been awarded the Environmental Media Award, which is awarded to the best television show or film with an environmental message.

EMA also hosts the annual Environmental Media Awards, an awards ceremony which celebrates the entertainment industry's environmental efforts.

== Board members ==
Debbie Levin has been CEO of the EMA since 2000. Other board members include:

- Marina Afshar and Ari Afshar
- Malin Akerman and Jack Donnelly
- Brandon ‘STIX’ Salaam Bailey
- Lance Bass and Michael Turchin
- Ed Begley Jr.
- Hart Bochner
- Genesis Butler
- Emmanuelle Chriqui
- Ashlan Cousteau and Philippe Cousteau
- Blythe Danner
- Frances Fisher
- Glenn Gainor
- Brie Garcia and Bryan Danielson
- Bill Gerber
- Ray Halbritter
- Daryl Hannah
- Meg Haywood Sullivan
- Van Jones
- Sophia Kianni
- Rachel Kropa
- Michael Kutach
- Jay Lemery
- Wendie Malick
- Ashlee Margolis and Dan Fishman
- Mara Mitchell
- Alexx Monkarsh and Josh Monkarsh
- Francesca Orsi
- Madelaine Petsch
- John Quigley
- Nikki Reed and Ian Somerhalder
- Eli Roth and Vittoria Buraschi
- Drew Scott and Linda Phan
- Laura Turner Seydel
- Carla Shamberg and Michael Shamberg
- Amy Smart and Carter Oosterhouse
- Jaden Smith
- Mike Sullivan
- Karrueche Tran
- Ted Turner
- Amber Valletta
- Shailene Woodley
- Constance Zimmer
