= Marc Ian Barasch =

Author, film and television writer, producer

Marc Ian Barasch (born 1949) is a non-fiction author, film and television writer-producer, magazine editor, and environmental activist. Major books written by Barasch are The Healing Path (1992), Remarkable Recovery (1995), Healing Dreams (2001) and Field Notes on the Compassionate Life (2005). He has been an editor-in-chief of New Age Journal (which won a National Magazine Award and a Washington Monthly Award for Investigative Journalism under his tenure); and an editor at Psychology Today (where he was a finalist for the PEN Award); and Natural Health. He has also done journalistic writing for Conde Nast publications on the arts and the environment. He is Founder and Executive Director of the Green World Campaign (2006–present).

== Non-fiction writing ==
The Jungian psychoanalyst Claire Douglas, reviewing Barasch's book Healing Dreams in the Washington Post, cites "a poetic intensity" and "trail-blazing contributions to dream research." Barasch's bestselling study of spontaneous remission, Remarkable Recovery (with researcher Caryle Hirshberg) was the subject of a Newsweek article and garnered wide attention in the medical world. Israeli oncologist Dr. Moshe Frenkel of M.D. Anderson Hospital acknowledged the book as an impetus for a multi-institutional study of spontaneous remission and advocated its call for a Remarkable Recovery Registry. Barasch has participated in several international medical roundtables drawing upon this work, as well as his work championing a rigorous role for spirituality in the medical system. Barasch's Field Notes on the Compassionate Life a work of literary nonfiction blending scientific findings on altruism and empathy with psychology, spirituality, and a first-person exploration of human potential, attracted the support of figures like South African Nobel Prize winner Archbishop Desmond Tutu. Following its publication in 2005, Barasch lectured extensively around the U.S. calling for compassion and empathy to be "central organizing principles for civic life." He has advocated the practice of compassion as the connecting thread of the faith traditions, which he first articulated in a 2006 keynote address at the influential Episcopal Servant Leadership retreat in Asheville, N.C. He is also credited with helping to incept and catalyze the "Compassionate Cities" movement. The book was re-published in 2009 in paperback as The Compassionate Life.

== Environmental work ==
In broadcast media, Barasch's script for a 1992 global television special "One Child, One Voice" addressed world environmental issues with a blunt urgency. When advertisers shunned it, maverick broadcaster Ted Turner distributed the show minus commercials to 160-odd countries, appending his own on-camera appeal, and a 2002 re-edited broadcast won an Emmy Award. Barasch has executive produced TV specials for the Discovery Channel and England's Channel Four, and developed film projects at Columbia Pictures. He served as one of the early producers of the National Public Radio Show "E-Town." In 2005, he created a short-lived partnership with Fred Fuchs, former head of Francis Coppola's American Zoetrope Studio and former arts and entertainment chief for the Canadian Broadcasting company. Barasch has also produced film shorts to promote environmental causes.

In 2006, Barasch founded the Green World Campaign, a nonprofit whose stated mission is restoring the ecology and economy of struggling villages living on degraded land. With its slogan, "ReGreen the World," the organization has proposed massive regeneration of degraded woodland landscapes and anthropogenic savannah through holistic agroforestry, eco-agriculture, and afforestation/reforestation (A/R). It has connected donors and the public to grassroots efforts, particularly tree-planting, with interactive technology and media-driven campaigns. Barasch, who has referred to his strategy as "green compassion," has focused on planting multi-purpose trees (MPTs) to address a synergistic grab-bag of issues: restoration of indigenous ecology, poverty, sustainable rural economy, soil remediation, cultural preservation, biodiversity, and carbon sequestration. (Such an approach has lately become known by the term-of-art, "landscape restoration," with some 1.6 billion hectares worldwide deemed suitable by the U.N.) The first pilot program was in Ethiopia's Gurage Zone, and work then expanded to Ethiopia's Menegasha-Suba forest; Mexico's San Juan Atzingo forest; Orissa, India; Mindanao, Philippines; Kenya's Great Lakes region; and Bulumbi, Uganda. In 2011, a Green World Campaign office opened in Mombasa, Kenya, the country where it now focuses its work. The group evolved what it calls "holistic low-carbon development pathways" for struggling rural communities including Green World Schools programs (now numbering 85 in Kenya; co-management of Kenya's 15,000-acre Rumuruti Forest with an association of 5000 smallholder farmers; "clean" cookstoves (low-emissions, low fuel);"green" charcoal from agricultural waste (with the M.I.T.-based group Takachar); and a complementary currency project, Eco-Pesa, in Kenya's Kongowea slums. Barasch has served on the advisory committee of the United Nations Forum on Forests Secretariat for the International Year of Forests 2011.

In 2010, Barasch initiated with Will Ruddick, then director of Green World Campaign-Kenya, a "complementary currency” called the Eco-Pesa. This paper voucher system provided a new medium of exchange for the impoverished residents of Kenya's Kongowea slums, directing funding to community development, environmental rehabilitation and health-promoting activities. Participating community members received payments in Eco-Pesa redeemable at community businesses, which then circulated it among themselves, increasing local economic activity by approximately 10x. Encouraged by this success, Barasch proposed a “Green World Credit” system to fund global reforestation, which he referred to as a “treeconomy.” A second currency was launched in Miyani, Kenya, backed by a community maize mill. Ruddick founded Grassroots Economics , which in 2018 with Bancor Foundation launched a blockchain-based "Liquid Community Currency” designed to operate over SMS/USSD. Marc Barasch, in a 2018 interview in Forbes on what he heralded as the “Regenerative Revolution,” proposed a blockchain-based, global “Green World Token” based on conservation and development of natural capital (trees, agroecology, carbon-storing soil organic matter, restored hydrological cycles, etc.). Also in 2018, Barasch incepted and co-convened a conference of 300 leaders in the regenerative field in San Francisco's Mission District, ReGen18

In 2012, a Green World Campaign project was begun in Miyani, Kenya to plant drought-tolerant moringa trees, which some claim is the world's most nutrient-dense plant, for soil restoration, food security, and climate change adaptation. This led to a partnership with the Kenyan Red Cross, and a village-based women's social enterprise pressing seed-oil for local use in cooking and body-care. Barasch coined the term "regenerative enterprise" to describe a proposed business [www.greenworldventures.net] of commodities produced from moringa seed oil and high-protein leaf powder. Barasch conceived and launched the Green World Children's Choirs in 2012, collaborating with Disney and Broadway composer Alan Menken, Broadway lyricist Lynne Ahrens, and educator Yunus Sola of the Abraham's Path Initiative. The first choir was drawn from Malaysia's Tenby Schools. In 2013, Green World Schools programs began to incorporate peace and conflict resolution, which expanded into a "Trees for Peace" movement initiated by GWC-Kenya country director Will Ruddick to avert violence in the Kenyan elections. This was joined by youth organizations like the Kenyan Scouts and the national Wildlife Clubs. It led to a new project, funded by Disney Worldwide Conservation Fund, to restore Kenya's Pungu Watershed. In 2013, Barasch began an outreach to global faith communities under the slogan, "Plant a seed of spirit in the soil of the world." In January 2015, he launched an initiative, the "Green World Charter to Renew the Tree of Life," in partnership with the Parliament of the World's Religions. The initiative's goal is a joint announcement by religious and spiritual leaders at the Parliament's October 2015 conference to match the goals of the New York Declaration on Forests to regreen a billion acres by 2030.

Barasch designed an interactive art installation for public participation in "re-greening the world" for a Google-sponsored exhibit at New York's Chelsea Art Museum and the Streaming Museum (a virtual consortium of public art groups in 23 global cities focused on urban media facades). The project, originally titled "Mission to Earth," culminated in an interactive motion graphics display, running on a dozen screens in New York's Time Square on Earth Day, 2011. The project, called "Text TREE," spread widely through social media, and received an International Green Award in London. It was subsequently adopted by pop star Jason Mraz, who integrated "Text TREE" and its "Treemometer" into his summer-fall, 2012 "Love is a Four-Letter Word" tour. Barasch is a popular lecturer and "thought-leader" who has appeared on TV shows like "Good Morning, America" and "NBC Dateline," and made appearances at Art Center College of Design's Big Picture, Mindshare L.A. University of California's Mind/SuperMind series, Oxford, T.E.D.-x, et al.

== Acting ==
He had a co-starring role in a feature documentary by director Tom Shadyac ("Bruce Almighty," "Liar, Liar") entitled "I Am," a film based in part on Barasch's Field Notes on the Compassionate Life, and which was theatrically released in 70 U.S. venues to mostly favorable reviews.

== Early life and family ==
Barasch grew up in New Rochelle, New York and is the son of well-known film and television writer/producer Norman Barasch. He was educated at Yale University, where he studied literature, psychology, anthropology, and film. He was a founding member of the psychology department at Naropa University in Boulder, Colorado, the first accredited Buddhist-established university in the U.S. He has served on the faculty of the Institute for Religion and Health (Houston, TX), and on a white paper advisory panel at George Washington Institute for Spirituality and Health of the School of Medicine and Health Sciences that was tasked with advising the National Institutes of Health on integrating "spirituality" into the health care system.

== Music ==
A trained musician, he has played and recorded with the Rock Bottom Remainders, a "lit-rock" band consisting of authors Amy Tan, Stephen King, Maya Angelou, and others. He has collaborated as a lyricist with Grammy and Academy Award-winner Alan Menken, composer of "Beauty and the Beast,""Little Mermaid," "Aladdin," et al., with whom he continues to work on the international Green World Children's Choirs to engage global youth in treeplanting efforts.

== Books ==
- Barasch, Marc Ian (1984) [1983]. The Little Black Book of Atomic War. HarperCollins (hardback), Dell/Doubleday (paperback). ISBN 978-0-207-14983-2, ISBN 0-207-14983-6
- Barasch, Marc Ian (1994). The Healing Path: A Soul Approach to Illness. Tarcher. ISBN 0-87477-743-7, ISBN 0-14-019486-X
- Barasch, Marc Ian (1995). Remarkable Recovery. Riverhead. ISBN 978-1-57322-530-4. ISBN 1-57322-000-0, ISBN 1-57322-530-4
- Barasch, Marc Ian (2000). Healing Dreams: Exploring the Dreams That Can Transform Your Life. Riverhead. ISBN 978-1-57322-167-2. ISBN 1-57322-167-8, ISBN 1-57322-897-4
- Barasch, Marc Ian (2005). Field Notes on the Compassionate Life: A Search for the Soul of Kindness. Rodale Books. ISBN 1-57954-711-7
- Barasch, Marc Ian (2009). The Compassionate Life: Walking the Path of Kindness (revised paperback edition of Field Notes on the Compassionate Life). Berrett-Koehler.ISBN 9781576757567
