= Kheyti =

Indian startup

Kheyti is an Indian startup which is the developer of a simple idea "Greenhouse-in-a-Box" which saves water and makes yield seven times higher. It offers a pioneering solution for local farmers to increase yields and decrease costs.

== History ==
Kheyti was founded in late 2015 by Sathya Raghu Mokkapati, Kaushik K, Saumya, and Ayush Sharma. Kaushik Kappagantulu is the chief executive officer and Saumya is the Chief Program Officer. Now, Greenhouse-in-a-Box idea is in more than 1,000 farms. It is also partner of Bank of Baroda.

== Awards ==
- Earthshot Prize for Protect and Restore Nature in 2022
- Cash Prize of US$42,000 during MassChallenge in 2017 in Israel
- Global Social Venture Competition in 2017
- Best Sustainable Award by Government of Telangana in 2017
- Kellogg Social Entrepreneurship Award in 2017
