= Frankfurt Zoological Society =

International conservation organization

- Formation: 1858
- Type: NGO
- Purpose: Preservation of wilderness and biodiversity
- Headquarters: Frankfurt am Main
- Region served: Eastern Africa, South America, South East Asia, Balkan states in Europe, Germany
- President: Klaus Becker
- Managing Director: Dr. Christof Schenck
- Website: www.fzs.org

The Frankfurt Zoological Society (FZS) is an international conservation organization founded in 1858 with headquarters in Frankfurt am Main, Germany. FZS focuses on maintaining biodiversity and conserving wildlife and ecosystems in protected areas and outstanding wild places. FZS leads and supports about 26 projects in 18 countries. Bernhard Grzimek, renowned German zoo director, zoologist, book author, editor, and animal conservationist in postwar West-Germany, served as president of the Frankfurt Zoological Society for over forty years.

The registered non-profit association has approximately 3,500 members in Germany and abroad. Individuals, companies, and organizations can become members.

== History ==
FZS was founded in 1858 by Frankfurt citizens to establish a zoo, the Frankfurt Zoological Garden, which it operated until the First World War. The city council then assumed responsibility for the zoo until 1950, when the society again became the zoo's development association. In the 1950s the society became involved in conservation in the Serengeti, and began supporting development of national parks in Africa. Since then the society has become increasingly involved in protecting and preserving endangered animals and their environments worldwide.

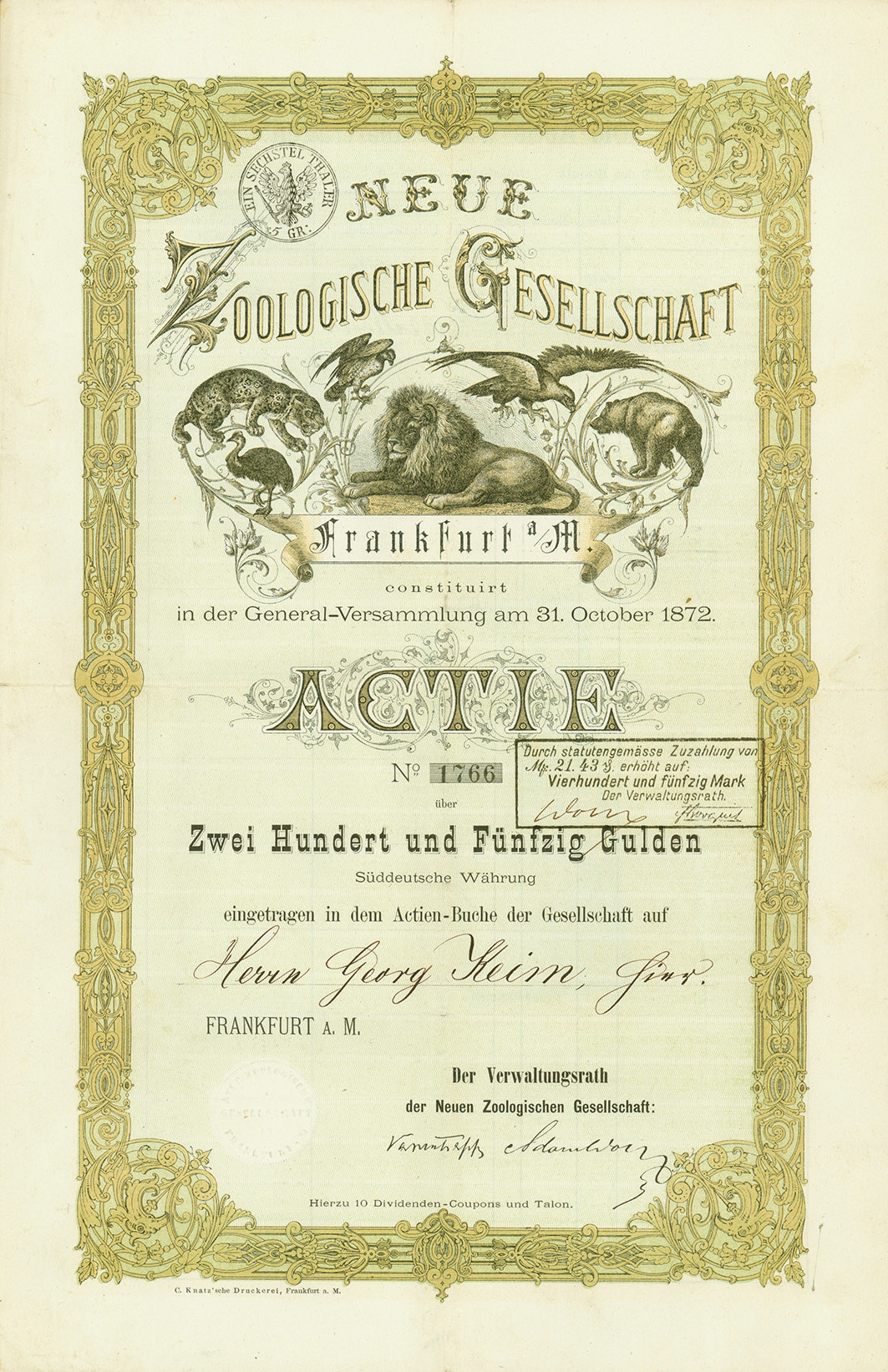
Share certificate of the New Zoological Society dated October 31, 1872

The association follows in the tradition of a stock corporation legally established on March 7, 1858, whose goal was to build a zoological garden in Frankfurt am Main. The year before, after thorough examination, the senate of the then Free City of Frankfurt had declared the keeping of bears, wolves, and wild boars in escape-proof cages to be harmless. The initiators of the idea to establish a zoo against the backdrop of growing interest in natural history were wealthy Frankfurt citizens, and they therefore began issuing shares in the company in October 1857. By the time of the first general meeting in March 1858, 246 shareholders had subscribed to shares worth a total of 80,000 guilders. Just five months later, Frankfurt Zoo, Germany's second zoo, opened on Bockenheimer Landstraße.

When the lease for the zoo grounds expired, a site east of Frankfurt city center – known as Pfingstweide – became the zoo's new location in February 1874, where it remains to this day.

On March 29, 1874, the zoo was opened at its new location. This society remained the operator of the zoo until World War I, but went bankrupt when the war led to a drastic decline in admission fees and other income. As a result, in the summer of 1915, Frankfurt Zoo was transferred entirely to the city, and the Zoological Society was dissolved.

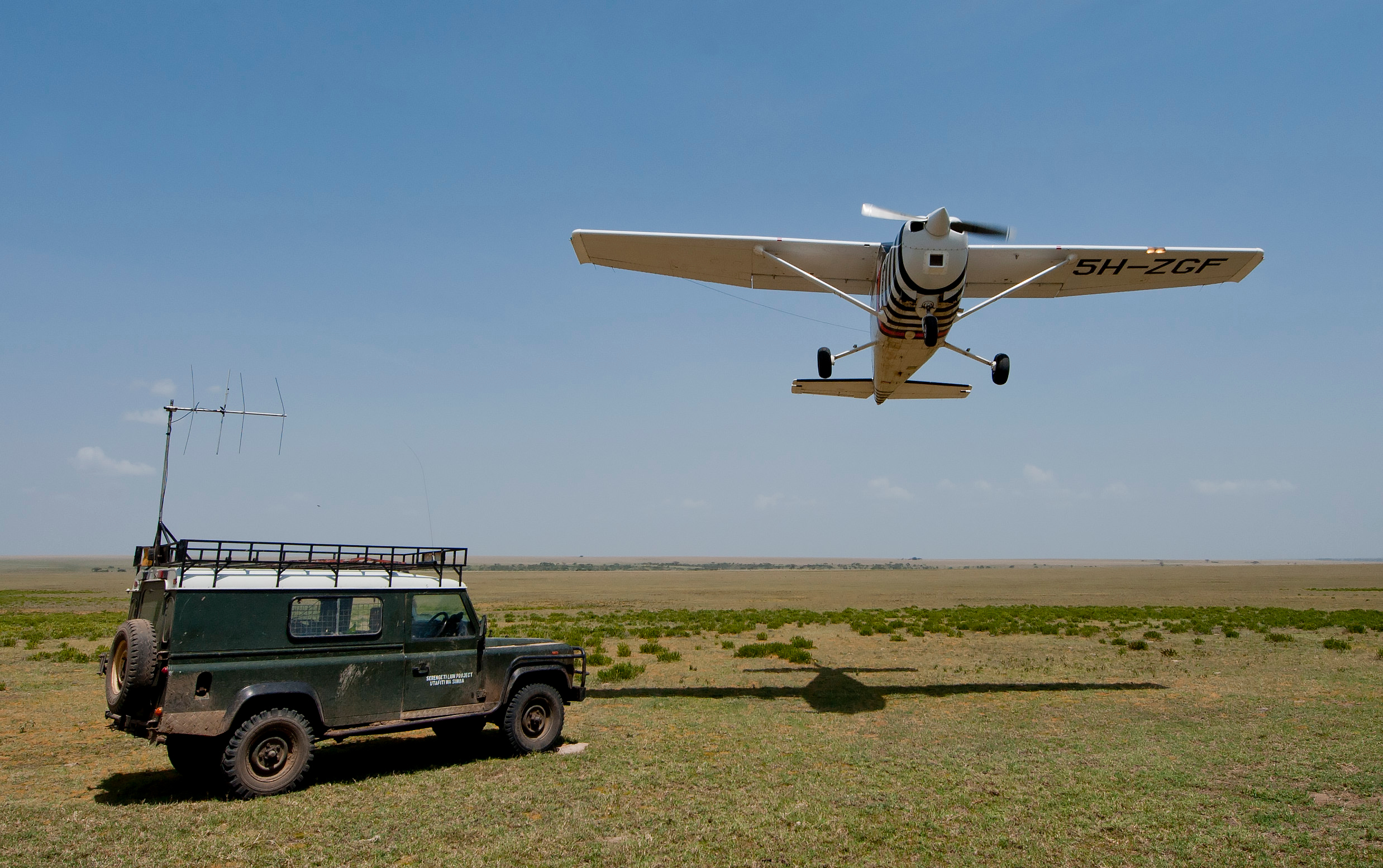
FZS airplane is flying across the Serengeti National Park, Tanzania.

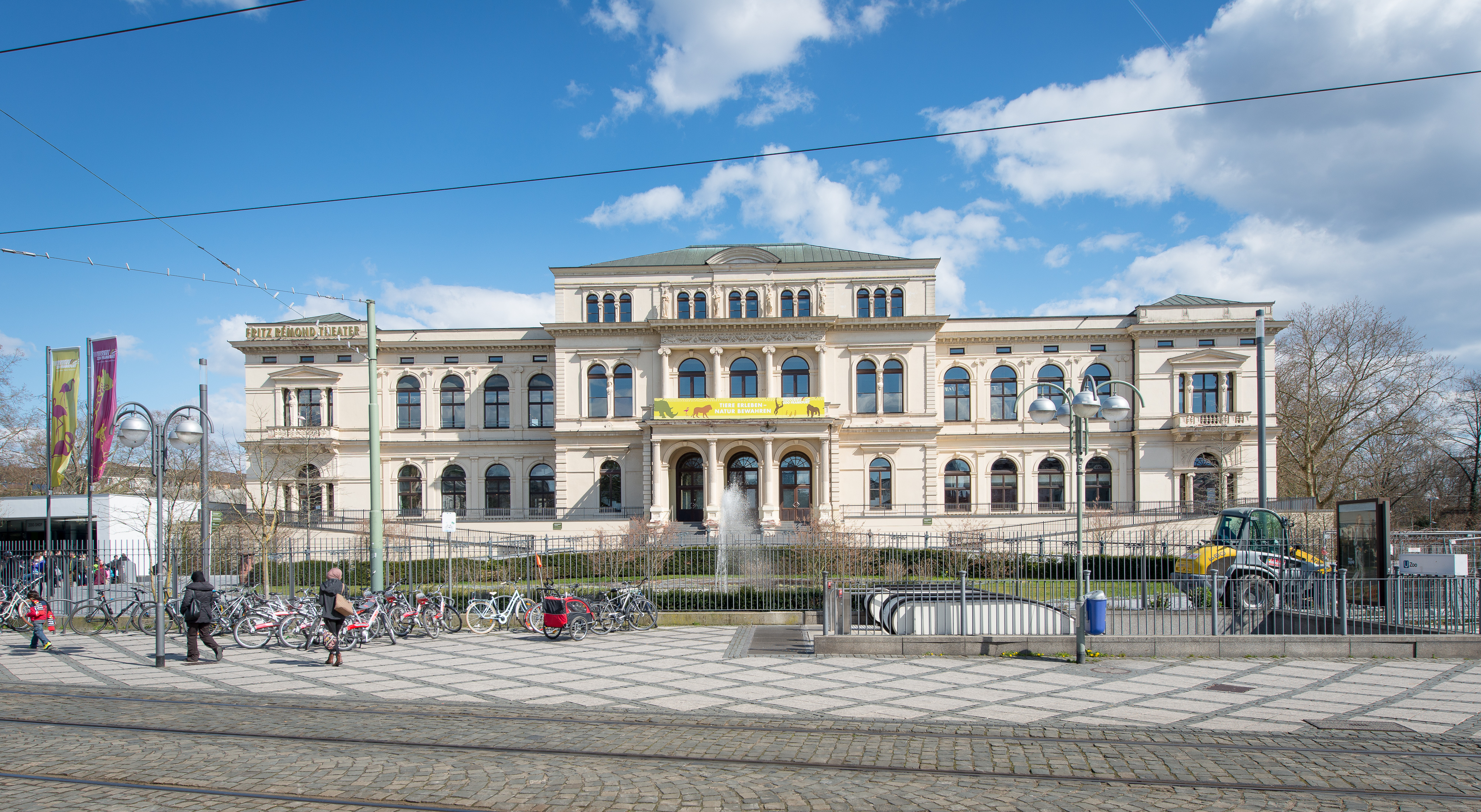
The Zoological Society building in Frankfurt am Main, constructed in 1876, is the headquarters of the FZS

It was not until after World War II, during the final phase of which the Frankfurt Zoo and all of the association's documents were destroyed by aerial bombs during the air raids on Frankfurt am Main, that the idea of a support association for the zoo was revived. Bernhard Grzimek had organized the reconstruction of the zoo facilities from May 1945 onwards and also collected private donations for this purpose. This led to the founding of the Society of Friends and Supporters of the Zoological Garden on February 15, 1950, which collected donations and also raised money for the zoo through a lottery.

In 1958, one hundred years after the founding of the first Zoological Society, which had since ceased to exist, the friends and supporters decided to rename their association and link it to the name of the original society. From 1958 onwards, the association was initially called the Frankfurt Zoological Society again, but shortly afterwards it was given the name it still bears today.

During the 1950s, the self-image of all zoological gardens changed increasingly from purely displaying animals to preserving and breeding endangered species. The pioneer in Germany was Bernhard Grzimek, director of Frankfurt Zoo, who initially only wanted to procure animals from Africa for his zoo, but through his stays in Africa became increasingly aware of the threat to the wild animal populations there. As the Zoologische Gesellschaft Frankfurt (ZGF) documents, this decade marked a turning point: “In the 1950s the self-image of zoological gardens shifted from mere exhibition of animals to the conservation and breeding of endangered species. A pioneer in Germany was Bernhard Grzimek”. Likewise, the English-language page of the ZGF emphasizes that “In the 1950s he was already pointing out the problems of the massive extinction of species, the rapid loss of natural habitat and campaigned for the protection of wildlife”.

These experiences led the Frankfurt Zoological Society to see nature conservation as a new focus of its work. After Michael Grzimek's accidental death in East Africa, the Zoological Society established a memorial fund for Grzimek's son Michael in 1960, which became the precursor to the special account "Help for Endangered Wildlife,"which has been promoted since 1961.

In his television series "Ein Platz für Tiere" (A Place for Animals), Prof. Bernhard Grzimek asked for donations to this account at the end of each episode, thus laying the foundation for the Society's worldwide nature conservation work.

Donations and bequests allowed the capital stock to grow steadily over the decades. In 2001, this capital, around 33 million euros, was transferred to one of the largest nature conservation foundations in Europe: the Help for Endangered Wildlife Foundation.

The Frankfurt Zoological Society is a member of BioFrankfurt, the Frankfurt network for biodiversity.

== Activities ==
FZS provides logistical support to conservation areas around the world, sponsors animal census surveys, provides conservation-related education and gives advice to organizations involved in establishing conservation areas. FZS participates in programs to protect highly endangered species and to reintroduce endangered species, acquires land for conservation areas and helps protect and regenerate natural landscapes.

== Projects ==
The Frankfurt Zoological Society claims to be involved in 26 projects across 18 countries. The society focuses on the conservation of wilderness and biological diversity in the last large wilderness areas on our planet. These wilderness areas include large grasslands, forests, wetlands, and mountains. The society focuses on the conservation of wilderness and biological diversity in the last large wilderness areas on our planet. These wilderness areas include large grasslands, forests, wetlands, and mountains.

The association's projects are long-term and are carried out in close cooperation with local organizations and authorities. The involvement of the local population is also an important part of the project work. The Frankfurt Zoological Society acts both as a coordinator at its headquarters in Frankfurt and actively with its own teams of employees in the individual project countries.

Zoological Society vehicle in the Bale Mountains in Ethiopia Every year, huge herds of wildebeests and zebras migrate thousands of kilometers through the Serengeti-Mara region. ZGF Program Director Peter Pratje works on the reintroduction of orangutans in Bukit Tigapulu, Indonesia.

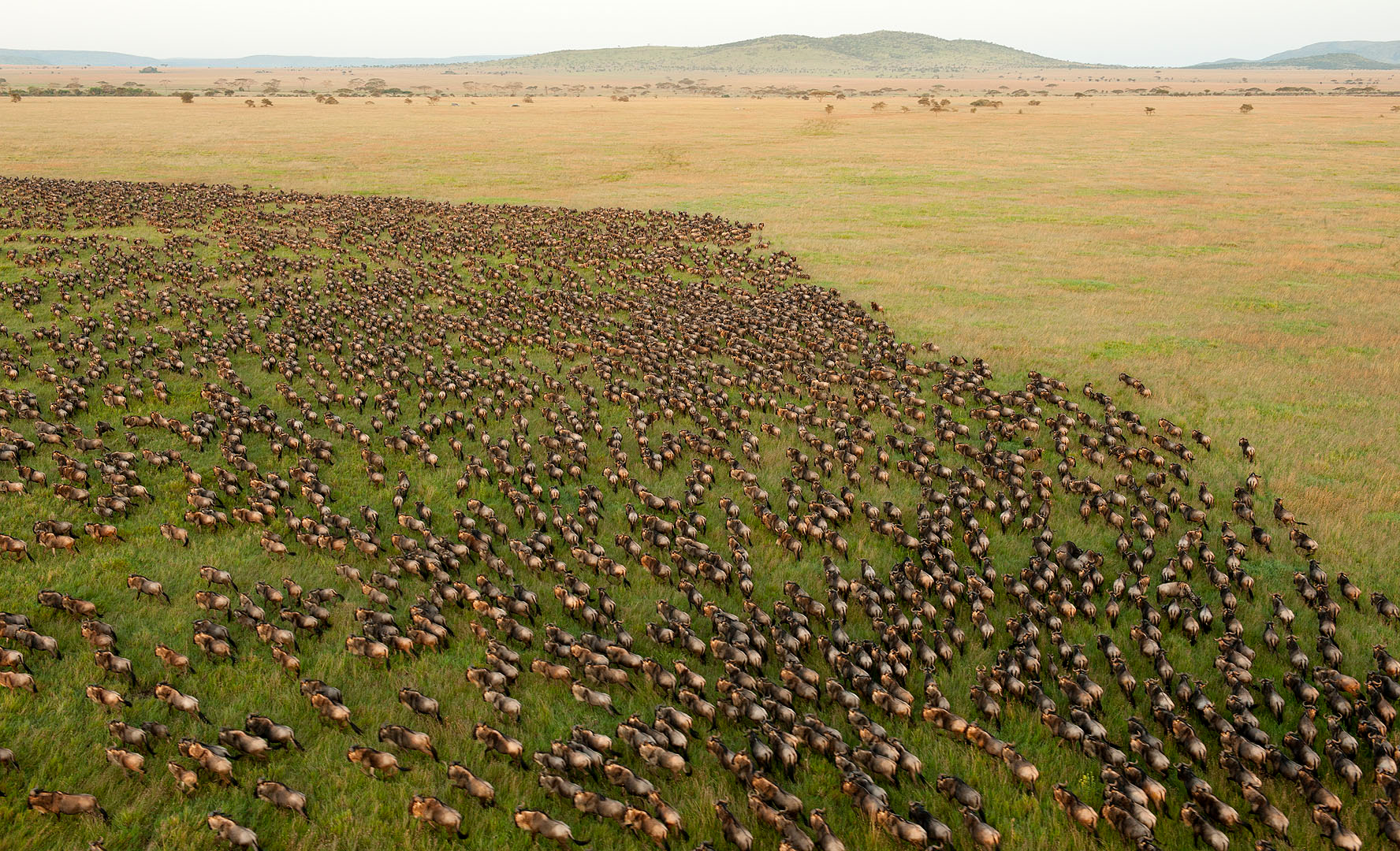
Wildebeest Migration in Serengeti National Park, Tanzania. Each year, enormous herds of wildebeest and zebra move thousands of kilometres across the Serengeti-Mara. These herds have a pivotal role in maintaining the ecosystem.

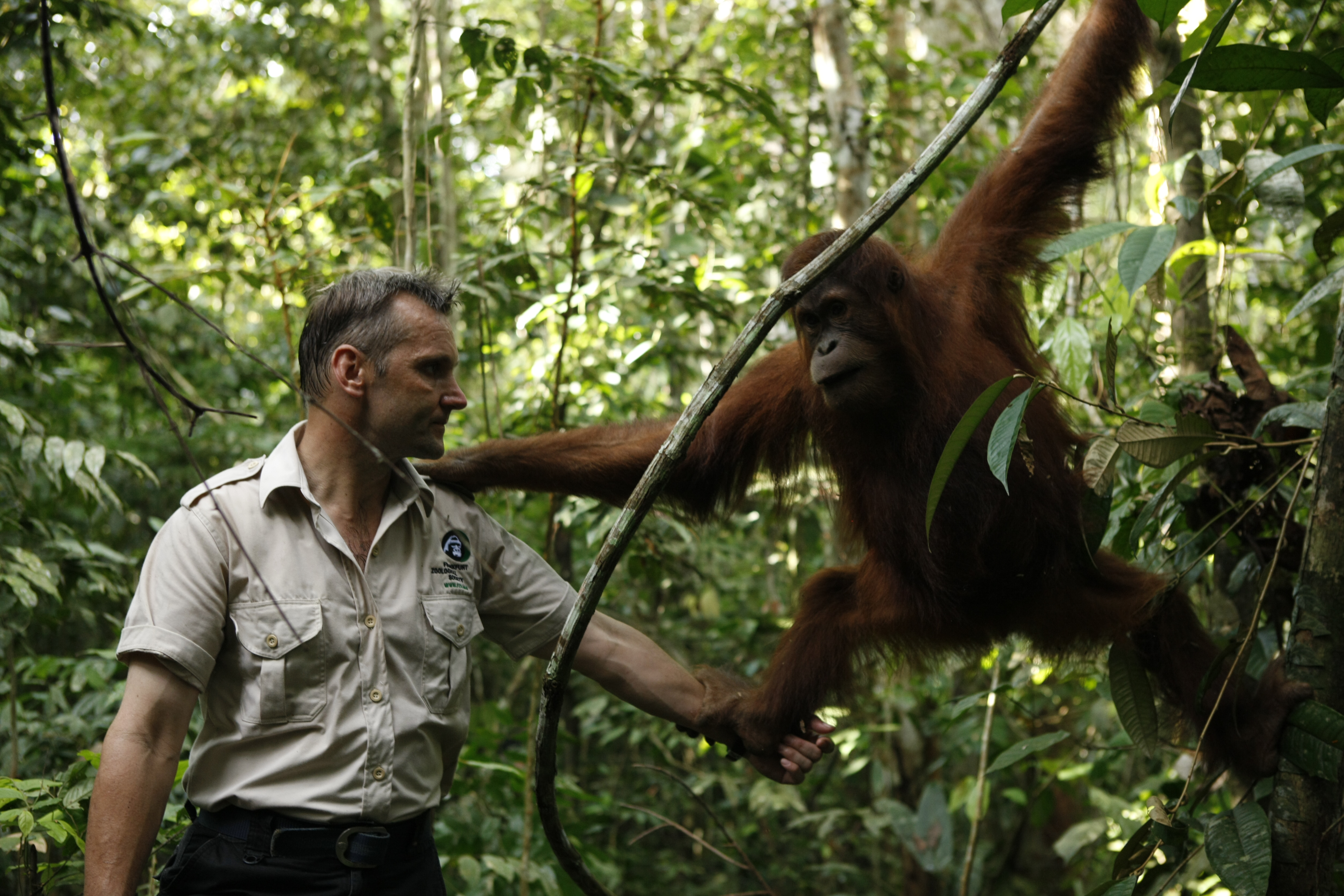
FZS Programm Director Peter Pratje working with orangutans in Bukit Tigapulu, Indonesia.

=== Africa ===
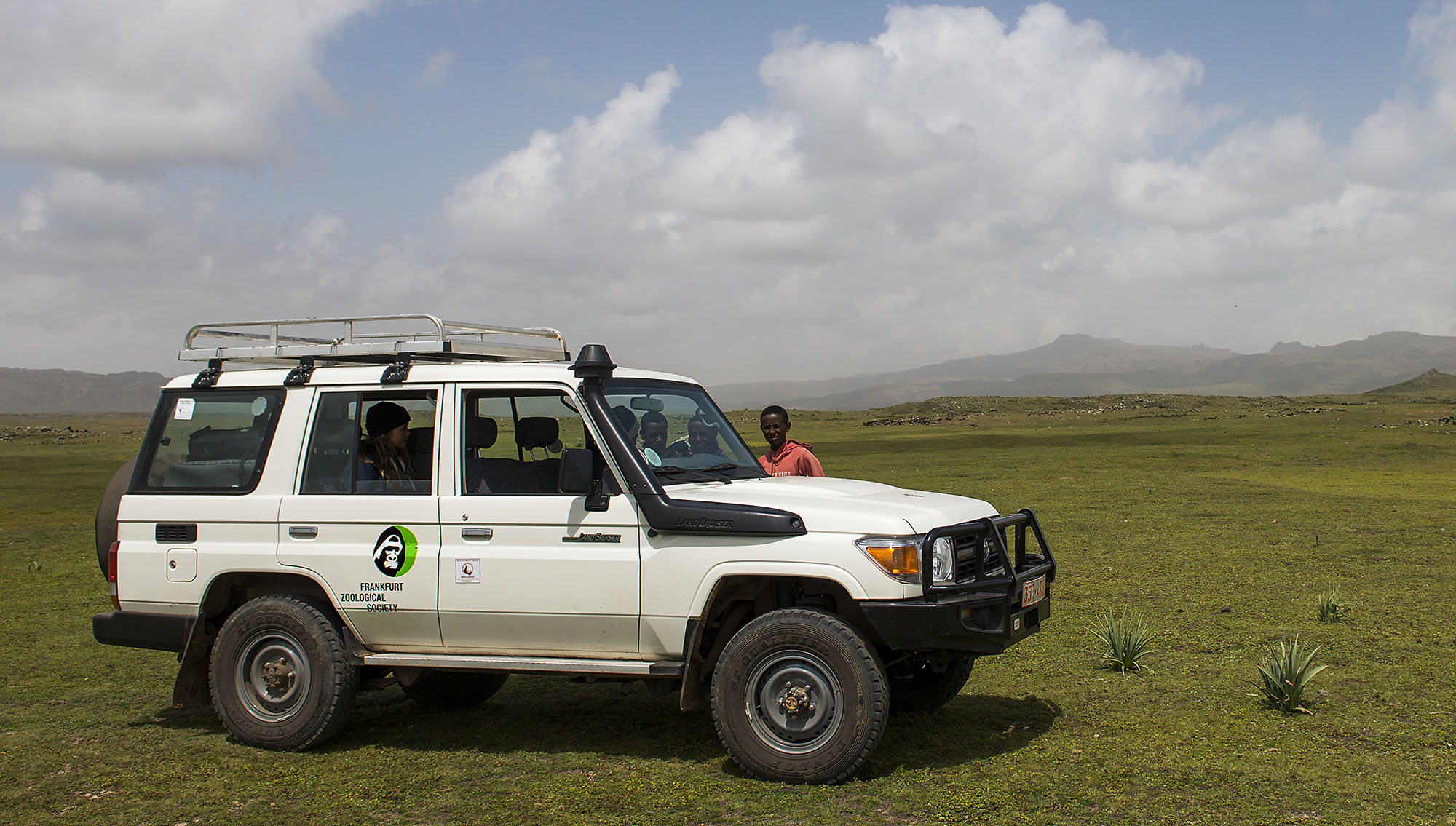
Operational vehicle of the Zoological Society in the Bale Mountains in Ethiopia

Traditionally, many FZS projects are located in Tanzania. Currently, FZS is engaged in the protection of the Serengeti, the Selous, and the Mahale Ecosystem, and carries out research for the preservation of East Africa's threatened habitats. Livestock and migration data is collected; rangers, scientists and veterinarians are educated; and environmental education is promoted. Further projects are located in Zimbabwe (Gonarezhou sanctuary), Zambia (North Luangwa) and East Congo (Virunga and Maiko National Parks). Exemplary local partners are Tanzania National Parks Authority (TANAPA) and Tanzania Wildlife Research Institute (TAWIRI).

=== Asia ===
Another major project is situated in Central Sumatra: The Bukit Tigapuluh Sanctuary for the preservation of rainforest and wildlife. This project is aiming at the resettlement and reintroduction of confiscated Orang Utans, which are prepared for their life in the wild through the local "jungle school". Further aspects of the work on site are conflict-prevention between humans and elephants, environmental education and initiatives supporting the local population in balancing out economical development and their traditions. Important project partners on site are the Bukit Tigapuluh National Park as well as the Orang Utan Project (TOP), the Jambi Province Conservation Authority and WWF.

In Kazakhstan, FZS is involved in the Altyn Dala Conservation Initiative. This international joint project furthers the protection of Kazakhstans unique grasslands and their keystone species. The initiative aims at building up a network of protected grasslands in central Kazakhstan. A special focus lies on the saiga-antelopes, of the Betpak-Dala population as they hold a key role in the ecosystems of the steppes and semi-deserts. Exemplary local project-partners are the Association for the Conservation of Biodiversity of Kazakhstan (ACBK) and the Royal Society for the Protection of Birds (RSPB).

=== South America ===
In South America, FZS furthers the protection of the biodiverse forests located at the Andes' eastern slope and the adjacent lowlands. Patrols, aerial view evaluation, the education of rangers and environmental education are supported here. On site, FZS collaborates, amongst others, with Crees Foundation and the Fondo de las Américas (FONDAM).

The ZGF supports the Chiribiquete National Park in Colombia in cooperation with the German Ministry for Economic Cooperation and Development and the British Arcadia Foundation through the Legacy Landscapes Fund.

In Peru, ZGF teams work with the Manú National Park, the Bahuaja-Sonene National Park, the Alto Purús National Park, and the Yaguas National Park, among others.

The Frankfurt Zoological Society is also part of the Amazonian Regional Alliance for the Reduction of the Impacts of Gold Mining. Together with organizations such as WWF and the Foundation for Conservation and Sustainable Development (FCDS), it is investigating the ecological consequences of illegal gold mining on the Río Puré in the border region between Peru and Colombia.

=== Europe ===
==== Kazakhstan ====
In Kazakhstan, the Frankfurt Zoological Society is participating in the Altyn Dala Conservation Initiative. This international joint project is committed to protecting Kazakhstan's unique grasslands and their key species. The aim of the initiative is to establish a network of protected grasslands in central Kazakhstan. The focus is particularly on the saiga antelopes of the Betpak-Dala population, as they play a central role in the ecosystem of the steppes and semi-deserts. Project partners in Kazakhstan include the Association for the Conservation of Biodiversity of Kazakhstan (ACBK) and the Royal Society for the Protection of Birds (RSPB).

==== Wilderness in Germany ====
In Germany, the Frankfurt Zoological Society protects wilderness areas by purchasing land and supporting their designation as protected areas in appropriate categories (e.g., national parks). It also promotes public and expert debate on wilderness and supports this through public relations work. Project partners include the Brandenburg Nature Landscapes Foundation and the David Nature Foundation.

With funding from the BMU and BfN, the Zoological Society coordinated the project Wildniskommunikation in Deutschland (Wildlife Communication in Germany) from 2015 to 2017 as an initiative of the DNR Strategy Group on Nature Conservation Areas. The aim was to create greater acceptance for wilderness areas in the densely populated Federal Republic. Several major nature conservation actors in Germany were project partners. The organization also promotes specific protected areas, including the beech forests in the Hohe Schrecke in Thuringia, areas of former military training grounds such as the Lieberoser Heide, and a project to develop a natural forest in the Wispertaunus.

== Financing ==
The Frankfurt Zoological Society finances its work primarily through third-party funds, donations, and income from the "Help for Endangered Wildlife" foundation it established. Individual protected areas managed by the ZGF, including Chiribiquete National Park in Colombia, receive long-term support from the Legacy Landscapes Fund (LLF). The ZGF also receives support for projects from Frankfurt Zoo, which generates additional funds through the Nature Conservation Euro, a voluntary earmarked donation.

== Networking ==
The association has a global network and, in addition to its contacts with project partners, also maintains many links with scientific networks, such as the EFA Nature Conservation Foundation and the Diversitas Deutschland network. It is a member of BioFrankfurt, the network for biodiversity, works with institutions of the Senckenberg Society in Frankfurt, with which it initiated the Frankfurt Conservation Center (FCC) together with Goethe University, and is a signatory to the Transparent Civil Society Initiative.

== Controversies ==
The ZGF has been criticized for its involvement in controversial nature conservation projects in Tanzania. In particular, the organization is accused of supporting the expulsion of Massai communities from their ancestral lands, for example in the Serengeti National Park and in Loliondo. Between 2009 and 2022, there were several attempts at displacement in Loliondo, during which houses were burned down and livestock confiscated.

Human rights organizations criticize the ZGF's approach of fortress conservation as colonial and racist, as it views indigenous peoples as an obstacle to nature conservation. In 1959, long-time ZGF director Bernhard Grzimek expressed criticism of the Maasai in his film Serengeti Shall Not Die and advocated their expulsion from the national park.

The ZGF has not yet officially apologized for earlier expulsions under Grzimek. A Maasai elder who was expelled from the Serengeti as a child described the ZGF as "the Maasai's number one enemy." Despite recent condemnations of the violence in Loliondo by the ZGF, human rights organizations criticize the organization for not sufficiently acknowledging its responsibility for the conflict.

The ZGF is also criticized for its close cooperation with the Tanzanian National Parks Authority (TANAPA), which is described as a "paramilitary organization" and has been involved in evictions. According to its annual reports, the ZGF equips TANAPA rangers with vehicles, aircraft, and equipment and finances their training, food, and accommodation. According to its own figures, ZGF has supported TANAPA with around 18.6 million euros since 2015.

Critics also criticize the personnel links between ZGF and TANAPA. Both the current and former Tanzania directors of ZGF previously worked for TANAPA. In addition, the ZGF is criticized for promoting wildlife tourism, which is seen as a threat to the rights of the Maasai.

The ZGF also receives tax money for its projects. The Federal Ministry for Economic Cooperation and Development has supported the ZGF with a total of 9.37 million euros since 2012.
