= Dynaxibility =

Dynaxibility is a compound word in the systemic view on methods, which also contains influences from change management and chaos theory. The word is a compound of Dynamics, Complexity Ability. It describes a method for dealing with change processes in organizations and their environment.

== Dynaxity ==
In principle, Dynaxibility is about the ability to deal with Dynaxity.
