= Coral Vita =

American sustainability enterprise

- Industry: Sustainability
- Founded: 2015
- Founder: Sam Teicher, Gator Halpern
- Headquarters: United States
- Website: https://coralvita.co

Coral Vita is a U.S.-based for-profit enterprise that restores degraded coral reefs using scalable land-based coral farming and climate-resilient propagation techniques. The company was founded in 2015 by Sam Teicher and Gator Halpern out of their master’s program at the Yale School of the Environment. In Freeport, Grand Bahama, it operates the world’s first commercial land-based coral farm for reef restoration, and it has expanded globally, with restoration projects in the Caribbean and Middle East.

== History ==
In May 2019, Coral Vita opened its Freeport, Grand Bahama site, which was destroyed months later by Hurricane Dorian. After months focused on humanitarian work in Grand Bahama, the company reopened the coral farm in March 2020. In January 2021, Coral Vita announced a US $2 million seed round to expand coral production, research, and technology development. The same year, the company was awarded Prince William’s inaugural Revive Our Oceans Earthshot Prize.

In 2023, the company launched a pilot restoration project in Dubai funded by DP World, and in 2024, expanded tourism initiatives in Grand Bahama. In 2025, the company raised a Series A funding round led by the Builders Initiative, the first of its kind for a coral restoration company. Since it was launched, its founders have been recognized by a number of social entrepreneur awards and programs, such as the Echoing Green Fellowship, the United Nations Young Champion of the Earth, the Halcyon Incubator, the JMK Innovation Prize, and the Forbes Under 30 list.

== Technology and operations ==
Coral Vita employs microfragmentation, an established coral cultivation technique in which corals are cut into small pieces to stimulate tissue regrowth, rapidly accelerating grow-out times and increasing species diversity for restoration. The method was discovered in 2014 by marine researcher Dr. David Vaughan and restoration ecologist Christopher Page.

The company also incorporates assisted-evolution techniques to help strengthen coral resilience to climate change threats, pioneered by Dr. Ruth Gates, also one of Coral Vita’s original advisors, and Dr. Madeleine van Oppen. Following identification through scientific screening processes, genotypes with greater resistance across species are subjected to heat-stress and, if successful, bred sexually and through clonal fragmentation, to produce stock for future out-planting.

Additionally, the company integrates both wild and indoor coral spawning with controlled lighting schedules, which allows for multiple reproductive cycles annually instead of one to increase genetic diversity.

To fund large-scale restoration and impact, Coral Vita: sells restoration-as-a-service to clients such as coastal hotels, insurers, governments, and cruise-port developers that rely on healthy reefs for the estimated $2.7 trillion generated annually through shoreline protection, fisheries, and tourism; offers adopt-a-coral programs for individuals and nature-positive brands; licenses proprietary ocean tech solutions; relocates coral from coastal impact zones; harnesses conservation finance mechanisms; and uses their farms as eco-tourism attractions and marine education centers for local communities.
