= Vidyut Mohan =

Indian social entrepreneur

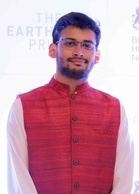
- Vidyut Mohan in 2021
- Born: New Delhi, India
- Occupation: Social entrepreneur
- Organization: Takachar
- Known for: Forbes 30 Under 30 (2019); Young Champions of the Earth (2020); Earthshot Environmental Prize (2021)

Vidyut Mohan (born 1991) is an Indian social entrepreneur. He is the co-founder of Takachar, a company that recycles agricultural waste into marketable carbon products, offering an alternative to the heavily polluting practice of burning agricultural byproducts.

== Early life and education ==
Vidyut Mohan was born and raised in New Delhi, where pollution severely affects the air quality, especially during the agricultural burn season. He attended Sardar Patel Vidyalaya, focusing from an early age on STEM subjects.

He went on to study at RV College of Engineering, completing a thesis project in response to the water crisis among India's farmers. The project was a software platform that generated estimates of water needs to optimize use of solar pump systems. He graduated with a degree in mechanical engineering in 2012.

Mohan studied for a master's degree in Sustainable Energy Technology and Sustainable Entrepreneurship from the Technical University of Delft. In 2014, while a student at Delft, he began exploring alternative methods for disposing of agricultural waste, or biomass, on the belief that a reduction in agricultural burning in India could be one way to meet the urgent need for better air quality. He graduated in 2015 with honors.

== Career ==
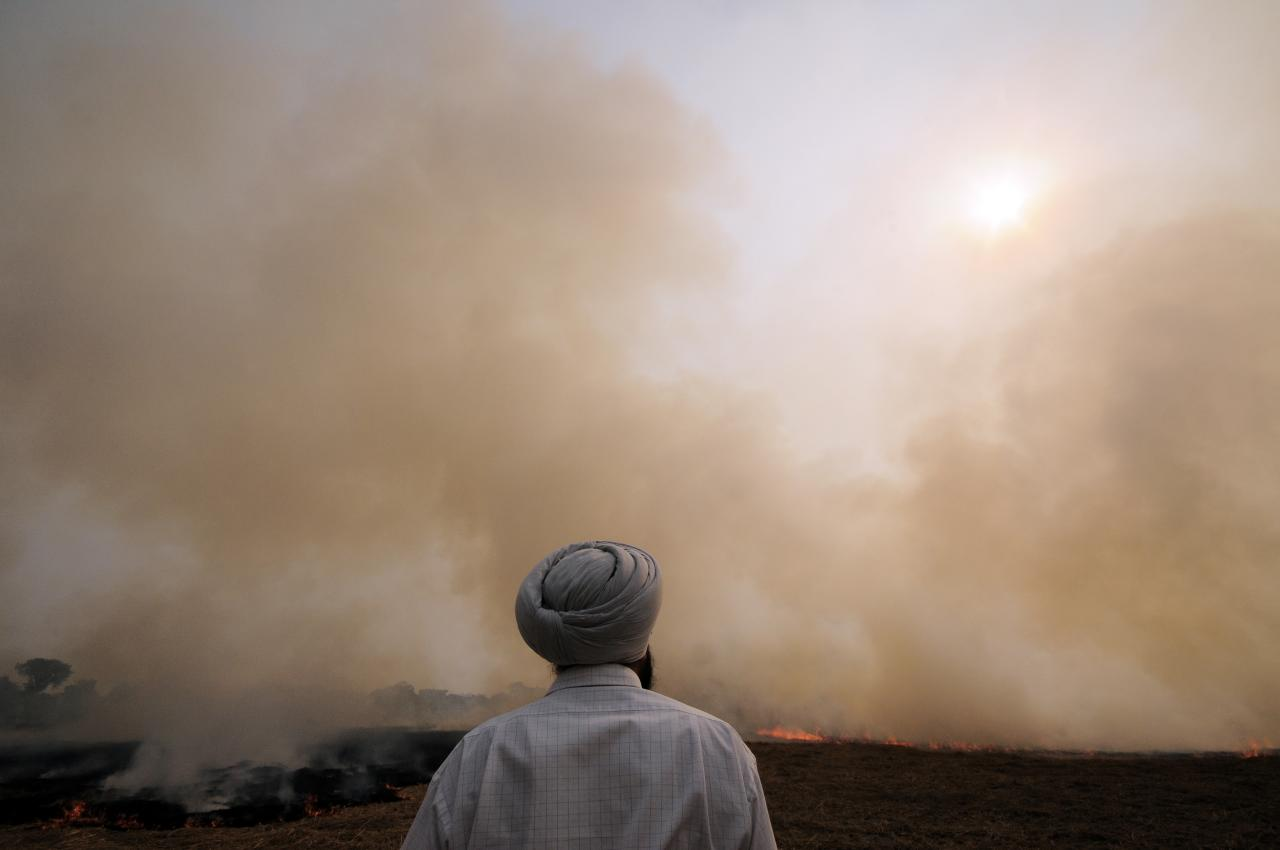
Hazy skies during the burning of rice residues after harvest around Sangrur, SE Punjab, India.

After receiving his master's degree, Vidyut Mohan worked for Simpa Networks on the development of affordable home solar power systems intended for use in rural areas. He was a senior user experience researcher with Simpa for two years before moving on to Berkeley Lab, where he worked as a bio-energy consultant. Mohan also consulted on bio-energy with MIT's Abdul Latif Jameel Water and Food Systems Lab.

In 2016 he ran a biofuel pilot project based on his graduate research in Uttarakhand, processing pine needle waste into marketable charcoal. The positive and community-wide effects of the processing quickly became clear: not only was fire risk reduced by the clearing of dry needles from forest floor, but local restaurants were able to make use of the resulting biofuel product.

=== Takachar ===
The success of the 2016 pine needle program led him to launch Takachar in 2018 with co-founder Kevin Kung. They worked to scale up their collaboratively developed biomass upgrade system, offering access to waste conversion to an increased number of farmers using a wider variety of agricultural byproducts.

Takachar creates a sustainable bottom-up system that reduces pollution while supplying alternatives to fossil fuels, with the added benefit of creating a new revenue stream for farmers. By 2020, the company had converted 3,000 tons of biomass waste that would otherwise have been burned.

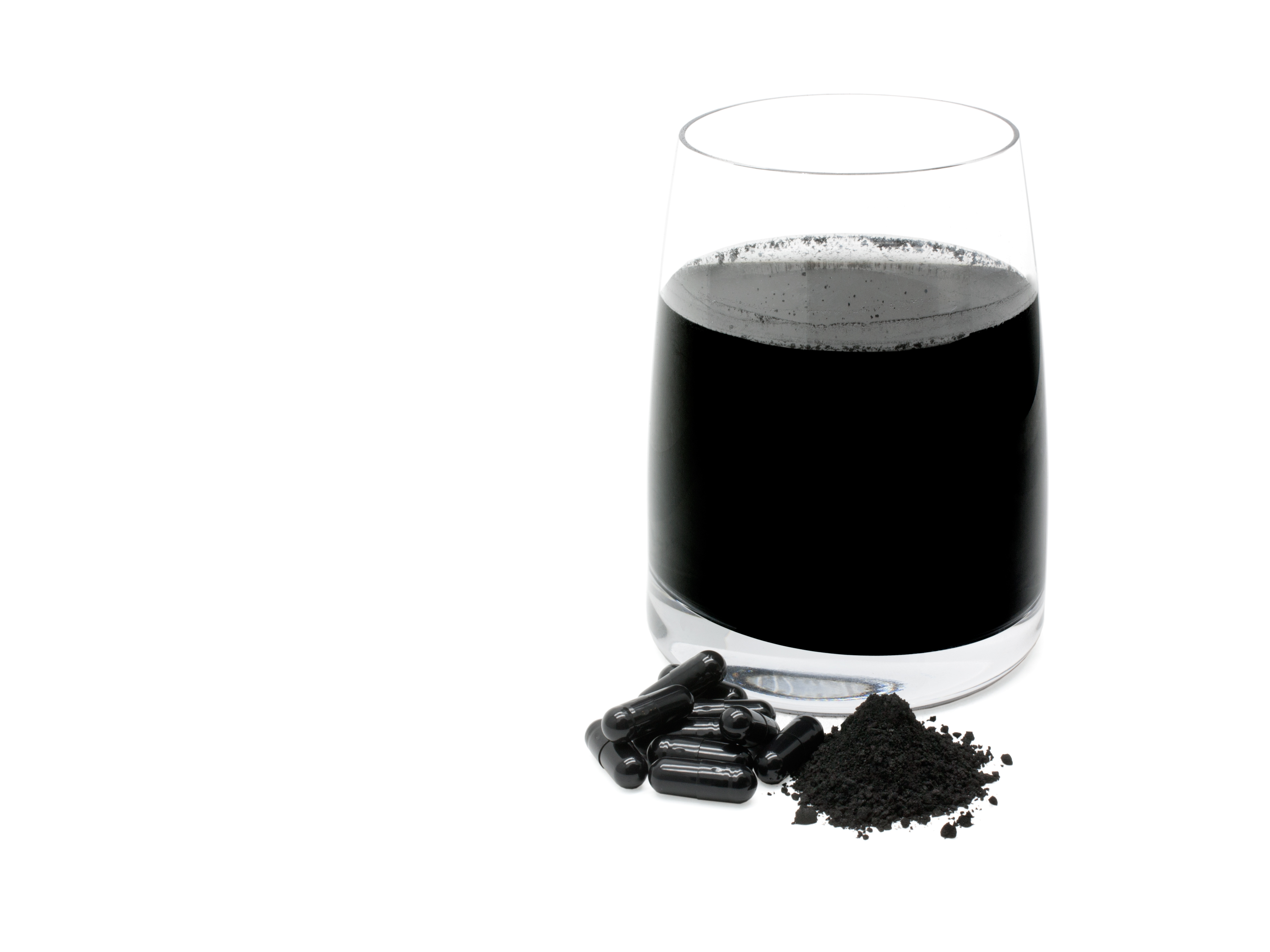
Activated charcoal in various forms

The company purchases waste materials like grain husks, shells, and straw from farmers. Using their own portable, affordable equipment, they convert the waste into biofuels, fertilizers, and marketable chemicals .

The roasting machine used for this conversion process was developed by Mohan to run on the heat it produces, requiring no external power source. It uses a process called oxygen-lean torrefaction, which removes moisture and volatile organic substances from biomass, leaving behind a dense, carbon-rich product . The machine is designed to be made of simple parts, so that it can be assembled quickly and repaired easily by the farmer-users themselves.

One of Takachar's products is activated carbon, used for water filtration and purification, which it sells to large corporations like Brita. When he was preparing to launch Takachar, Mohan identified this market as having great potential for waste-derived alternatives, because most activated carbon is made from virgin wood.

Mohan has plans to expand Takachar beyond India, and has begun work on sustainable fertilizer production with a partner based in Kenya.

== Personal life ==
Vidyut Mohan is an accomplished tabla player. While pursuing his engineering degree, he also spent five years studying music at Gandharva Mahavidyalaya New Delhi.

== Awards and honors ==
Vidyut Mohan was named an UNLEASH Energy Talent in 2017. In 2019 he received an Echoing Green fellowship and was included on Forbes's "30 Under 30" list in the social entrepreneurs category.

In 2020 Mohan was honored as one of the United Nations Environment Programme's Young Champions of the Earth, an award that comes with financial support for his project as well as access to mentorship.

Vidyut Mohan and Takachar received the 2021 Earthshot Environmental Prize, awarded by the UK's Prince William to exceptional innovators working to find solutions that combat the existential threat of climate change. They were one of five finalists in the "Clean our Air" category, and received a prize of one million pounds.
