= Reforestation in Costa Rica =

Conservation program

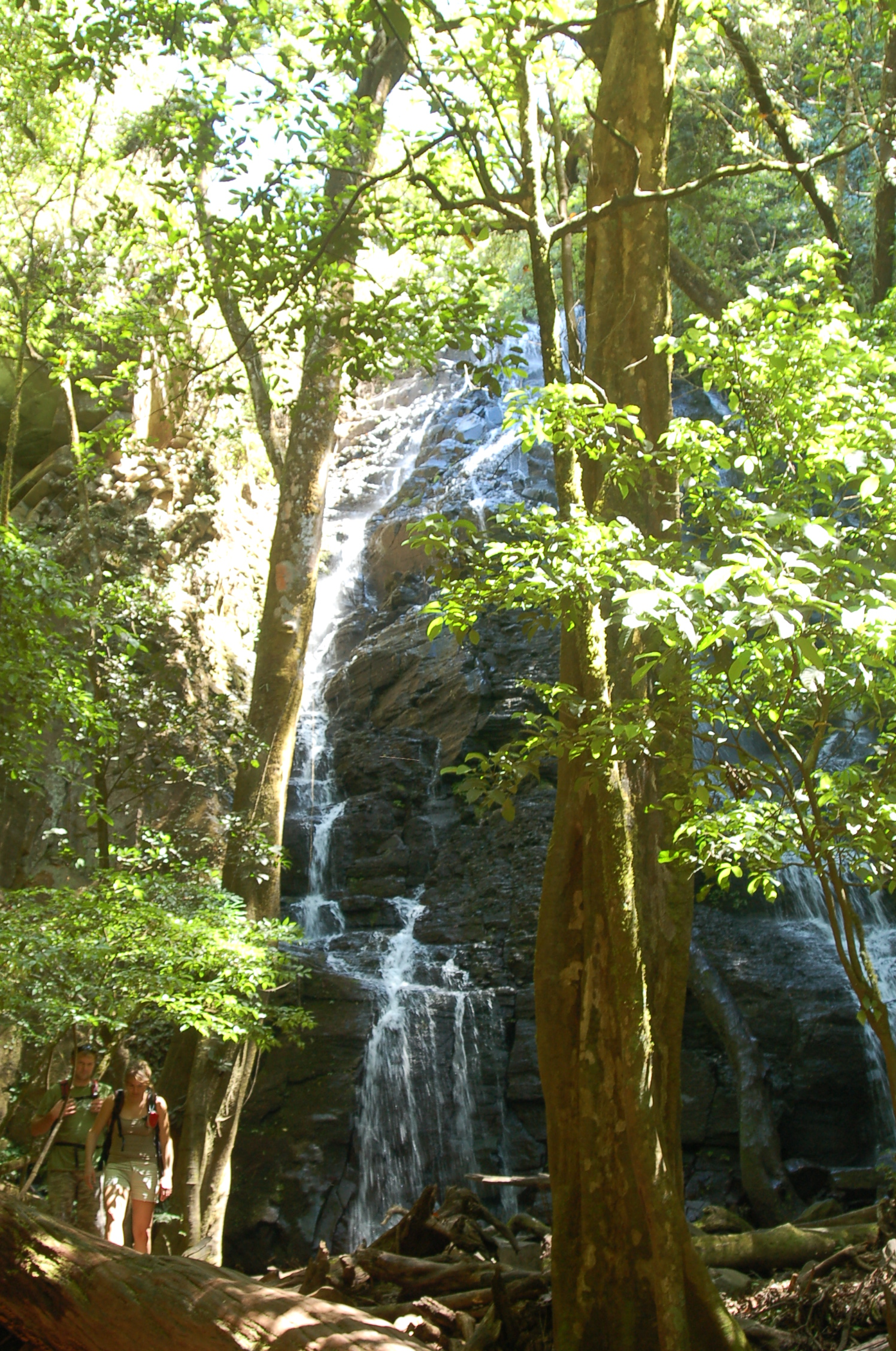
A rainforest waterfall in the Rincón de la Vieja National Park which was established in 1973

Reforestation efforts are being made in Costa Rica to recondition its biodiversity and ecosystems that were affected by heavy deforestation in the 1900s.

== History ==
Costa Rica has six different ecosystems, and is considered a biodiversity hotspot– having 5% of the world's total biodiversity within 0.1% of its landmass. The decline of the Costa Rican rainforest was due to unplanned logging in the mid-1900s. Loggers cleared much of the tropical rainforest for profit. By the 1990s, Costa Rica had the world's highest global deforestation rates. As a result, the Costa Rican government began its efforts to repair the damage inflicted on their landscape during this time and to develop in a sustainable manner.

=== Deforestation ===
In the 1940s, agriculture and unchecked logging were the main catalyst of the rapid decline of Costa Rica's indigenous woodlands. By the 1980s, two-thirds of the tropical rainforest were lost to these deforestation practices. Such rapid and forceful deforestation was due to the country's inappropriate policies like: cheap credit for cattle, land-titling laws which rewarded deforestation and rapid or imprudent expansion of road systems.

== Purpose ==
A vast amount of the Costa Rican natural landscape was lost, therefore the government introduced two measures to protect and revive it. Firstly, the government made it illegal to clear forest without permission. Secondly, the government introduced payments for ecological services (PES) which provided an economic incentive to conserve and restore the forest.

These measures were so successful that, in 2021, the country won the first-ever Earthshot Prize for their conservation efforts.

In an attempt to reverse the harmful effects caused by the inappropriate policies which drove reforestion, Costa Rica started using the PES program (Payment for Environmental Services). The PES program gave financial incentives to owners of lands and forest planations for forest protection, reforestation and sustainable landscaping.

The PES program led to several social benefits, improving quality of life and economic stanses. Between 1997 and 2019, more than 18,000 families benefited from the financial contributions.

== Challenges and obstacles to reforestation ==
There are several challenges to reforestation and environmental preservation efforts in Costa Rica. Many argue that eco-tourism, limited access for reforestation programs, and climate change are contributing factors that negatively impact reforestation efforts and environmental conservation.

=== Eco-tourism ===
More than 60% of Costa Rica’s annual 3 million tourists choose to travel to Costa Rica because of its environment and wildlife. Eco-tourism has emerged as a booster for Costa Rica’s economy and contributes to the country’s reforestation efforts, but increased traffic to the country may pose a danger to its conservation efforts. For example, the Manuel Antonio National Park in Costa Rica receives more than one thousand tourists per day in the high season. Due to this traffic, the monkeys of the area have developed disruptive habits in their interactions with visitors and have become garbage feeders. This high traffic is problematic because it puts pressure on the park's infrastructure and natural resources; the increased human presence leads to habitat degradation, pollution, and disturbances to wildlife behavior. The park also experiences soil erosion on the trail and has problems with visitors trespassing onto private land. Soil degradation can negatively impact the success of reforestation projects by eroding soil and making it difficult for new and young plants to take root and thrive.

=== Barriers to participation ===
Although farmers in Costa Rica participate in reforestation projects for pro-environmental reasons before other motivations, barriers still exist to engage in such programs. These obstacles can include “a lack of technical skills for planting trees, unsuccessful past experiences, and a lack of trust in external organizations and initial reforestation costs."

While the country’s Payment for Environmental Services [PES] program financially incentivizes landowners and farmers to engage in reforestation projects, many opt for more immediately profitable uses of land, such as agriculture and livestock farming, which offer quicker financial returns compared to the long-term benefits of reforestation. This preference for short-term gains can hinder the expansion of reforestation initiatives, despite the environmental benefits and financial incentives provided by the PES program.

=== Climate change ===
Costa Rica is vulnerable to extreme weather conditions, such as drought, storms, hurricanes, and extreme precipitation. Climate change and its intensification of such events pose a threat to reforestation efforts. “The average temperature has increased between 0.2°C and 0.3°C per decade since 1970. Precipitation varies a lot from one year to another depending on the El Niño-Southern Oscillation (ENSO) phenomenon, the cycle of warming and cooling of the tropical Pacific Ocean which has implications for global weather." As a result of shifting climate patterns, young trees may struggle to successfully grow and regenerate forests.

Costa Rica is particularly vulnerable to wildfires, with its peak fire season typically beginning in mid-February and lasting around 11 weeks. The risk of wildfires is heightened by the country's distinct dry season, especially in regions such as Guanacaste and the Central Pacific. Fire outbreaks can destroy reforestation sites, reversing progress and discouraging landowners from participating in future restoration efforts.

== Projects ==
Several initiatives and projects have been created to protect and restore nature including the Guanacaste Conservation Area (ACG) and BaumInvest.

=== Guanacaste Conservation Area (ACG) ===
The Guanacaste Conservation Area (ACG) consists of 163,000 acres of lands under the administration of the Sistema Nacional de Areas de Conservacion (SINAC). The ACG was created in 1986 with the mission to restore tropical dry forests, and surrounding ecosystems that have endured destruction caused by human action. Their efforts began in the area of Santa Rosa National Park, created in 1971. ACG focuses on the restoration, survival and conservation of the rich flora and fauna that occupy these lands and have been threatened by hundreds of years of human occupation.

=== BaumInvest ===
The BaumInvest reforestation project in Costa Rica began in 2007. This projects seeks to establish sustainable forestry and carbon compensation through afforestation. About 1,280 acres of pastureland has been reforested with native woods (more than one million trees were planted). This project led to the recuperation of 70 different amphibian and reptile species, as well as the survival of the Dipteryx panamensis (an endangered tree species). The project also provided several positive social impacts such as: promoting environmental education, and creating secure and sustainable rural jobs which helps reduce illegal logging, poaching and animal trading.

This project was the first reforestation project awarded the Gold Standard Certification for its positive impact on the environment.

== See also ==
- Deforestation in Costa Rica
- Wildlife of Costa Rica
