= Indigenous Desert Alliance =

Australian charity supporting indigenous land management

- Formation: 2014
- Headquarters: Perth
- Chairperson: Boyd Elston
- CEO: Samantha Murray
- Website: https://www.indigenousdesertalliance.com/

The Indigenous Desert Alliance (IDA) is an Australian non-government organisation that supports Indigenous ranger groups and land management organisations across the desert regions of Australia. Registered as a charity in 2019, the alliance provides advocacy, coordination, training, and support to strengthen Indigenous land management and cultural knowledge systems across the arid and semi-arid regions of Australia.

== History ==
The Indigenous Desert Alliance was formed by a group of desert ranger teams, Traditional Owners, and partner organisations seeking stronger coordination and advocacy for land management in desert regions. Since its inception, IDA has expanded to include dozens of member organisations, representing hundreds of Indigenous rangers across Western Australia, South Australia, and the Northern Territory.

In 2016, IDA hosted its first major ranger conference, which has since become a biennial gathering of desert ranger teams. Between 2018-2023, IDA facilitated the 10 Deserts Project that was funded through its partnership with the BHP Foundation.

Since 2023, IDA has coordinated an Indigenous-led recovery program for the great desert skink which is both a threatened species and culturally significant. In 2024, IDA opened a Desert Hub in Perth to serve as its headquarters, providing what was termed a culturally safe space for collaboration, training, and knowledge-sharing among Indigenous ranger teams.

== Purpose and Activities ==
IDA's work centres on supporting Indigenous ranger teams to manage vast desert landscapes through cultural knowledge, contemporary conservation science, and sustainable Indigenous land management practices. Its activities include:

- Advocacy: Representing desert ranger interests to governments, philanthropic bodies, and the public.
- Capacity building: Providing training, resources, and operational support to rangers, including through its Indigenous fire management and threatened species programs.
- Networking: Hosting gatherings, conferences, and workshops to connect ranger teams across desert regions.
- Research and policy: Contributing to scientific research and national policy discussions on Indigenous land management.

== Membership ==
IDA's membership is drawn from Indigenous ranger teams and land management organisations working across Australia's deserts. These teams are funded through programs such as the Indigenous Ranger Program (IRP) and the Indigenous Protected Area (IPA) program.
