= Hannah Jones (business) =

Welsh-American businessman

- Born: Brighton, United Kingdom
- Education: BA, University of Sussex
- Known for: Chief Sustainability Officer of Nike, Inc.

Hannah Jones is the founder and president of Nike Valiant Labs.

== Early life and education ==
Jones was born in Brighton, United Kingdom and grew up in Brussels, Belgium.

She obtained her Bachelor of Arts Degree in Philosophy and French in 1990 from the University of Sussex.

== Early career ==
In 1990, Jones began her career with the BBC’s social action unit, where she researched, reported and produced content for BBC Radio One and Radio Five channels. In 1992, she joined European non-governmental organisation CSV Media, where she led media campaigns focused on youth issues such as HIV/AIDS as the company's European Manager for five years.

== Nike, Inc. ==
In 1998, Jones joined Nike, Inc. as Director of Corporate Responsibility in Europe, the Middle East and Africa. In this capacity, she kick-started labor rights compliance, sustainability and community investments for Europe, Middle East and Africa. She opened the company's Brussels office, and began a partnership with the UN High Commission for Refugees to bring sport to refugee camps. She was a founding member of UN High Commissioner for Refugees António Guterres' Council of Business Leaders. In 2004, she became Vice President of Corporate Responsibility & Labor Compliance of Nike, Inc., where she oversaw the company's global philanthropic efforts, sustainability strategy, and labor rights in the supply chain.

In 2012, Jones became Vice President of Sustainable Business & Innovation, where she stewarded the Nike, Inc. sustainability strategy and led a team that innovated business models and leveraged transparency and collaborations in search of sustainable solutions.

In April 2014, she was promoted to Chief Sustainability Officer and Vice President of the Innovation Accelerator of Nike, Inc. guiding the company's focus on rethinking materials, production methods, and business models to solve complex sustainability challenges.

From 2004 to 2018, Jones was the lead executive to the Nike, Inc. Corporate Responsibility Board of Directors, and accountable for publishing bi-annual award-winning Corporate Responsibility reports.

In 2018, she founded and became President of Nike Valiant Labs, Nike's new business incubator, where she leads a team of entrepreneurs who channel the company's startup roots to build new businesses that serve customers in new, unimagined ways.

== Boards and philanthropy ==
In 2014, along with Steve Howard, Jones co-founded the We Mean Business Coalition, a global coalition of nonprofit organizations working with the world's most influential businesses to take action on climate change. We Mean Business played an instrumental role in the Paris Agreement.

In 2015, as a side project, she founded the League of Badass Women. The League of Badass Women is now led by Catherine Connors, evolving a volunteer-based global network of women dedicated to unleashing their full potential by championing each other, challenging the definition of leadership today, to exploring disruptive new leadership models for creating equitable sustainable workplaces for all.

Jones has held board seats on Mercy Corps, the Method Soap / Ecover companies, which were acquired by S. C. Johnson, and the Purpose Foundation, an arm of Purpose.com.

== Honors and recognition ==
In 2017, Jones was recognized by the Business of Fashion in their annual BoF500 index.

In 2013, she won the C. K. Prahalad Award for Global Business Sustainability Leadership.

In 2010, she was ranked no. 8 in Fast Company’s Most Creative People. She was also a nominee in Fast Company’s Top 100 Creative Leaders in 2008 and 2013.

Jones was the recipient of the World Economic Forum’s Young Leader Award in 2007. She also founded and chaired the Sustainable Consumption Initiative for the Consumer Industries grouping of the World Economic Forum for 5 years.
