= Takachar =

Environmental agribusiness

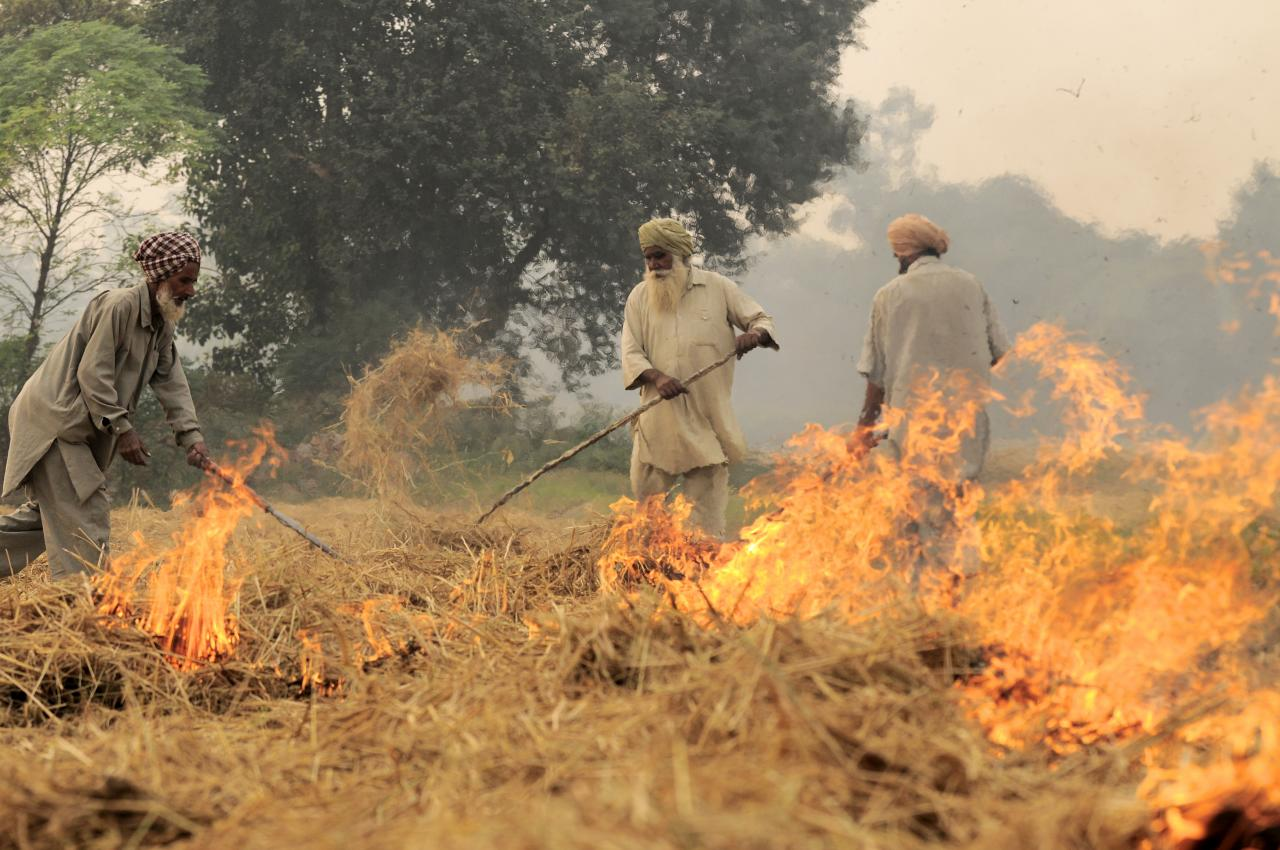
Traditional burning of rice stubble

Takachar is a limited company based in Boston as a spin-off from the Massachusetts Institute of Technology (MIT). It is developing torrefaction reactors, which will cook agricultural waste to create biochar or biocoal – a modernised form of charcoal burning. The target market is India, where traditional methods such as stubble burning create large amounts of smoke and have been a significant cause of air pollution.

The company was formed in 2018 by founders Vidyut Mohan and Kevin Kung.

Takachar creates a sustainable bottom-up system that reduces pollution while supplying alternatives to fossil fuels, with the added benefit of creating a new revenue stream for farmers. By 2020, the company had converted 3,000 tons of biomass waste that would otherwise have been burned.

In 2021, the company won an Earthshot prize in the "Clean our Air" category, as its process and products are expected to reduce the amount of waste that is burnt in the open air.

== Technology ==
Takachar's technology is centered on portable, small-scale, and low-cost torrefaction reactors designed to convert agricultural and forestry residues, such as rice husks, straw, and woody biomass, into valuable products like biochar, activated carbon, and biofuels. he core of this innovation is an oxygen-lean thermochemical process known as torrefaction, where biomass is roasted at moderate temperatures with limited oxygen, preventing combustion and instead transforming the material into a carbon-rich product. This process is self-sustaining, using a small portion of the biomass to fuel the conversion of the rest, and requires no external power input, which is vital for deployment in rural or off-grid locations.

The modular design of Takachar's reactors allows them to be attached to tractors or to be transportable via pickup trucks, allowing on-site processing directly at farms or logging locations. This decentralized approach solves traditional challenges with biomass logistics, as bulky and wet residues typically make transportation to centralized facilities economically and practically prohibitive. By processing waste at the source, Takachar reduces transportation costs by up to two-thirds and creates an economically viable alternative to open-air burning.
