= Altyn Dala Conservation Initiative =

Conservation project in Kazakhstan

The Altyn Dala Conservation Initiative (ADCI) is a partnership between the Association for the Conservation of Biodiversity of Kazakhstan (ACBK), the Government of Kazakhstan, Fauna and Flora, Frankfurt Zoological Society (FZS), and the Royal Society for the Protection of Birds. The Initiative’s aim is to support the conservation of steppe and semi-desert ecosystems across Kazakhstan.

In 2024 it was awarded The Earthshot Prize in the Protect and Restore Nature category.

== Background ==
ADCI is jointly initiated by Association for the Conservation of the Biodiversity of Kazakhstan (ACBK), the Committee of Forestry and Wildlife of the Ministry of Agriculture (Kazakhstan), Frankfurt Zoological Society, Fauna and Flora International and the Royal Society for the Protection of Birds. The program includes the whole area of around 50 to 60 million hectares, which corresponds to the distribution range of the Betpak-Dala Saiga antelope community in Central Kazakhstan.

The effort also hopes to reintroduce the Turkmenian kulan and Przewalski's horse, although the primary focus has been on the conservation of native Saiga antelope populations.

=== Conservation of Kulans ===
Currently, a program under ADCI is preparing a tiny population of endangered kulans for release into the wild. In 2017, a first batch of nine animals was released into an acclimatisation cage on the outskirts of the protected area of Altyn Dala. The creatures were carried 1200 kilometres by helicopter from Altyn-Emel National Park in the country's southeast.
