= Ampd Energy =

- Company type: Limited
- Industry: Energy Industry
- Founded: 2014
- Founder: Brandon Ng & Luca Valente
- Headquarters: Singapore
- Key people: CEO Brandon Ng CTO Luca Valente
- Website: www.ampd.energy

Ampd Energy is a company in the energy industry, which designs and manufactures energy storage systems (ESS). It is a member of the Incu-Tech Programme, a Hong Kong Government and HK Science and Technology Park initiative.

== History ==
Ampd Energy was founded in December 2014. Its founder, Brandon Ng, created an electric motorcycle company during a blackout in the city; he reasoned that the batteries of the motorcycles could be redesigned to power buildings.

In February 2015, Ampd Energy was accepted into the Incu-Tech program. As of June 2017, the company has raised a total of $3.7 million in seed investment.

== Product ==
In December 2016, the company launched an energy storage system called Ampd Enertainer. The system is used as an alternative to lead acid battery, Uninterruptible Power Supply systems (UPSs) and diesel generators.

Ampd Enertainer is primarily aimed at on-grid energy storage. It uses 1,792 rechargeable lithium-ion batteries cells, with each Ampd Silo having a storage capacity of 16.8 kWh.

== Awards and recognition ==
In early 2017, Ampd Enertainer received the CES2017 Innovation Award Honoree in the "Tech For a Better World" category. The company was also shortlisted as one of the finalists in Engadgets best CES 2017 in the start-up category.

In May 2017, co-founder and CEO Brandon Ng was named as a Forbes Asia 30 Under 30 honouree in the "Industry, Manufacturing & Energy" category.

== See also ==
- Lithium-ion battery
- Energy storage
- Standby generator
- Uninterruptible power supply
- Particulates
