= Genesis Butler =

American activist

Genesis Butler is an American animal rights and environmental activist working to promote animal welfare...

== Early life ==
Butler was inspired by her great-uncle civil rights leader Cesar Chavez. She first became a vegan when she was six years old, and then convinced her friends and family to follow a vegan diet. At the age of eight, she asked the Long Beach, California city council to endorse 'Meatless Mondays'.

At the age of ten, she gave a TEDx talk, "A Ten Year-Old's Vision for Healing the Planet" that discussed the negative impact of animal agriculture on the environment. She also runs her own Global Youth Movement. Butler is featured in Disney's 2020 Marvel Villain Project. She is the founder of the nonprofit organization Genesis for Animals, which raises funds for sanctuaries around the world.

In 2019 Butler was the spokesperson for People for the Ethical Treatment of Animals' pitch to Pope Francis about veganism; the group offered $1 million donation to a charity of his choice if he endorsed people to eat vegan for Lent. In 2023, she made a similar pitch to Prince William.
