= Bukhara Deer Memorandum of Understanding =

2002 memorandum between Kazakhstan, Tajikistan, Turkmenistan, and Uzbekistan

Memorandum of Understanding concerning Conservation and Restoration of the Bukhara Deer
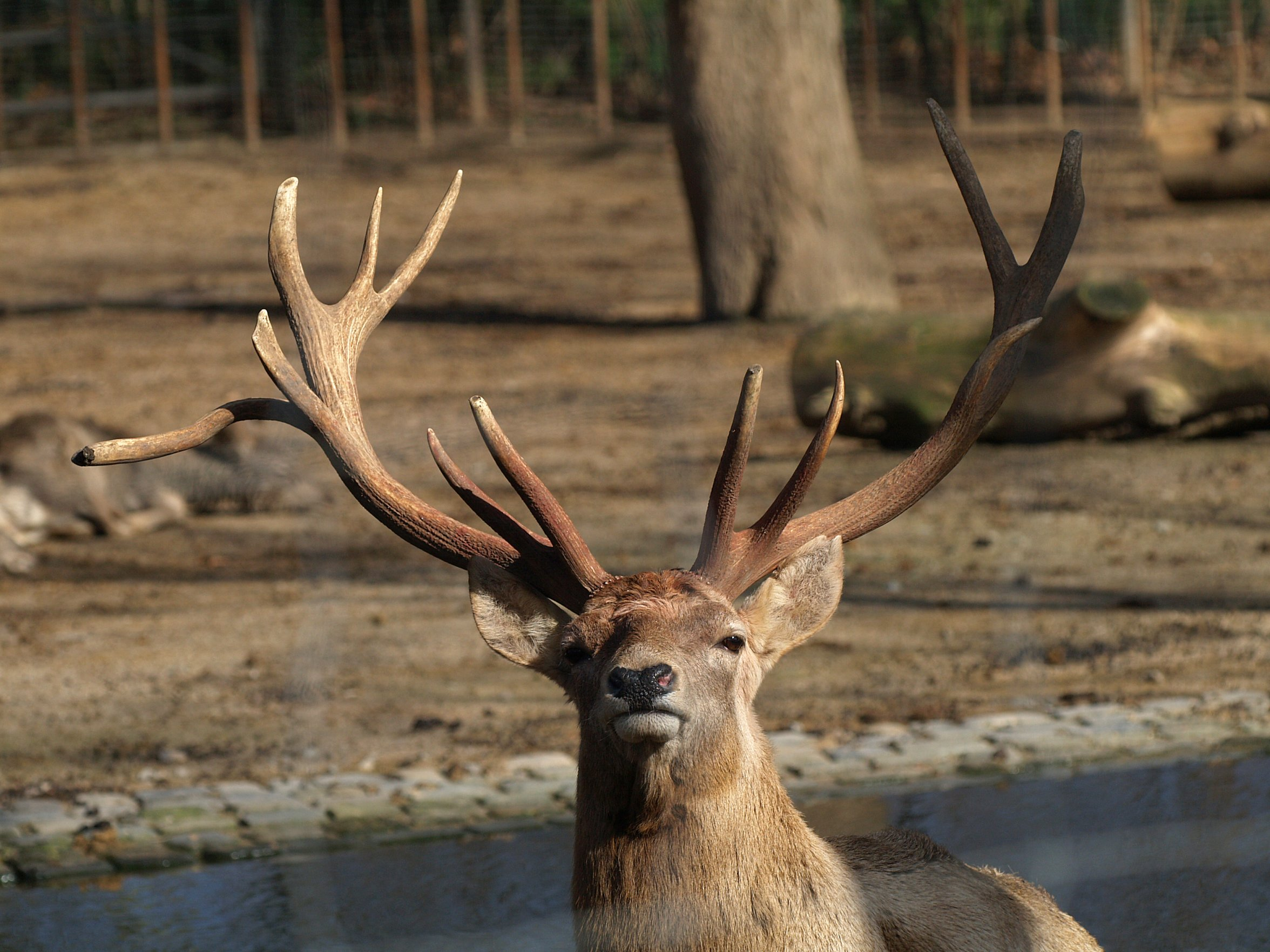
- Context: nature conservation
- Effective: 16 May 2002
- Signatories: Kazakhstan; Tajikistan; Turkmenistan; Uzbekistan
- Languages: English and Russian

The Memorandum of Understanding (MoU) concerning Conservation and Restoration of the Bukhara Deer is a Multilateral Environmental Memorandum of Understanding and was concluded in 2002 under the auspices of the Convention on Migratory Species of Wild Animals (CMS), also known as the Bonn Convention, in collaboration with the Central Asia Programme of the World Wide Fund for Nature (WWF). The MoU covers five range States (Afghanistan, Kazakhstan, Tajikistan, Turkmenistan and Uzbekistan). As of August 2012, four of them had signed the MoU, as well as a number of cooperating organizations. The MoU came into effect on 16 May 2002.

== Development of MoU ==
To implement the decision of the Conference of the Parties of CMS to list the Bukhara deer (Cervus elaphus bactrianus) on Appendix II of the Convention as a consequence of a number of human threats bringing the species at risk of extinction, an Article IV (4) agreement was concluded in 2002 and entered into effect on 16 May 2002 after the signature by the second range State.

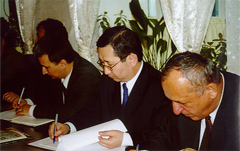
Signing of the Bukhara Deer MoU, 16 May 2002

Signatories to the Bukhara Deer MoU:

- Kazakhstan (16 May 2002)
- Tajikistan (16 May 2002)
- Turkmenistan (16 May 2002)
- Uzbekistan (18 September 2002)

In addition, three organizations have signed the MoU:

- CMS Secretariat (16 May 2002)
- WWF International (16 May 2002)
- International Council for Game and Wildlife Conservation (29 September 2002)

== Aim of MoU ==
Acknowledging that the Bukhara deer, with only a few hundred individuals left, faces threat of extinction as a result of human activities such as political conflicts, artificial regulation of the water regime, habitat destruction and illegal hunting, the MoU provides an intergovernmental framework for governments, scientists and other groups to monitor and coordinate ongoing conservation efforts. The Signatories take into consideration that joint coordinated and concerted activities should be taken urgently in order to prevent the further decrease and disappearance of the remaining Bukhara deer populations.

== Species covered by MoU ==
The MoU covers all populations of Bukhara deer, a subspecies of the red deer that is native to Central Asia (populations of Kazakhstan, Kyrgyzstan, Tajikistan, Turkmenistan, Uzbekistan and Afghanistan).

== Fundamental components ==
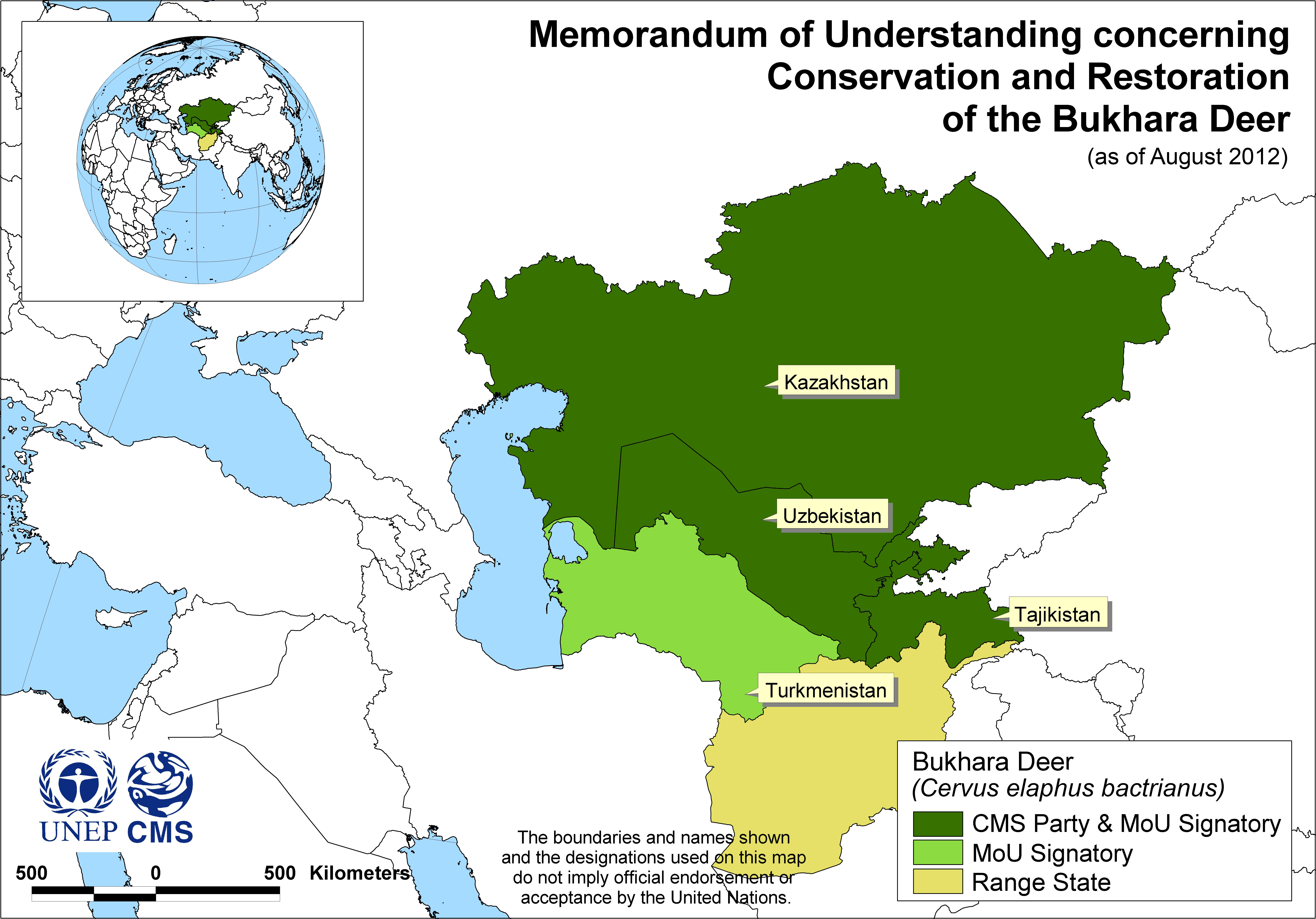
Map of Signatories to the Bukhara Deer MoU, as of August 2012

All Signatories agree to work closely together to improve the conservation status of the Bukhara deer throughout its range. To that end they shall, individually or collectively:

1. Provide strict protection for the Bukhara deer and identify, conserve and, where feasible and appropriate, restore those habitats of the species that are of importance in removing the sub-species form danger of extinction
2. Implement in their respective countries the provisions of the Action Plan, annexed to the Bukhara Deer MoU
3. Facilitate the expeditious exchange of scientific, technical and legal information needed to coordinate conservation and restoration measures, and cooperate with recognized scientists of international organizations and other range States
4. Provide the CMS Secretariat at least annually a detailed report on the implementation of the MoU

The MoU took effect immediately after at least two of the range States signed it (16 May 2002) and shall remain in effect indefinitely subject to the right of any Signatory to terminate its participation by providing one year’s written notice to all of the other Signatories.

== Meetings ==
=== Meeting of Signatories ===
Meetings of Signatories are organized regularly to review the conservation status of the Bukhara deer and the implementation of the MoU and Action Plan. National reports by individual Signatories and a report prepared by the Secretariat are also submitted.

The First Meeting of Signatories took place in Bergen, Norway, 20 November 2011, in the margins of the CMS COP10. The meeting brought together representatives from Kazakhstan, Tajikistan and Uzbekistan, as well as international experts. During the meeting the Signatories reviewed the conservation status of the Bukhara deer, which had previously disappeared from the riparian forests along the rivers Amu Darya and Syr Darya due to uncontrolled hunting, logging and unsustainable agricultural practices. Moreover, the MoU was amended to recognize Afghanistan as a range State. Furthermore, the Signatories agreed to develop a new Medium Term International Work Programme to outline conservation priorities for the next five years. Finally, the Signatories reiterated their commitment to enhance the conservation of Bukhara deer across its range and agreed on a number of national and transboundary priority actions.

=== Other meetings ===
A session on Bukhara deer was included in a workshop on the CMS Saiga Antelope MoU and other CMS instruments for migratory ungulates in Kazakhstan, which was held in Astana, Kazakhstan, 17–18 February 2011. Among other things this workshop reviewed the latest population status information for the species, and discussed projects contributing to implementation of the Bukhara Deer Action Plan in the different range States.

== Secretariat ==
The CMS Secretariat – located in Bonn, Germany – acts as the secretariat to the MoU. One of the main tasks of the secretariat is to organize regular meetings and to prepare an overview report compiled on the basis of information at its disposal pertaining to the Bukhara deer.

== Action Plan ==
The Action Plan is annexed to the MoU and is the main tool for conservation activities. The Plan has four main objectives:

- Restoration of the range and number of the Bukhara deer in suitable habitats
- Development of a transboundary network of protected areas
- Legal protection measures
- Enhanced international cooperation

== Activities and success ==
As of August 2012, activities have included captive breeding and reintroduction projects in Uzbekistan and Kazakhstan, and riparian forest habitat restoration in Tajikistan and elsewhere. Successes have been achieved in halting population declines in all four Signatory States (Kazakhstan, Tajikistan, Turkmenistan and Uzbekistan). Although absolute numbers of deer remain low, the total population has increased from 350 in 2002 to around 1,600 in 2010. Efforts continue towards the establishment of an adequate multi-country network of protected areas in riparian forests, and the GEF-supported “Econet Central Asia” project has been a significant component of this.
