= West African Elephant Memorandum of Understanding =

Memorandum of Understanding concerning Conservation Measures for the West African Populations of the African Elephant
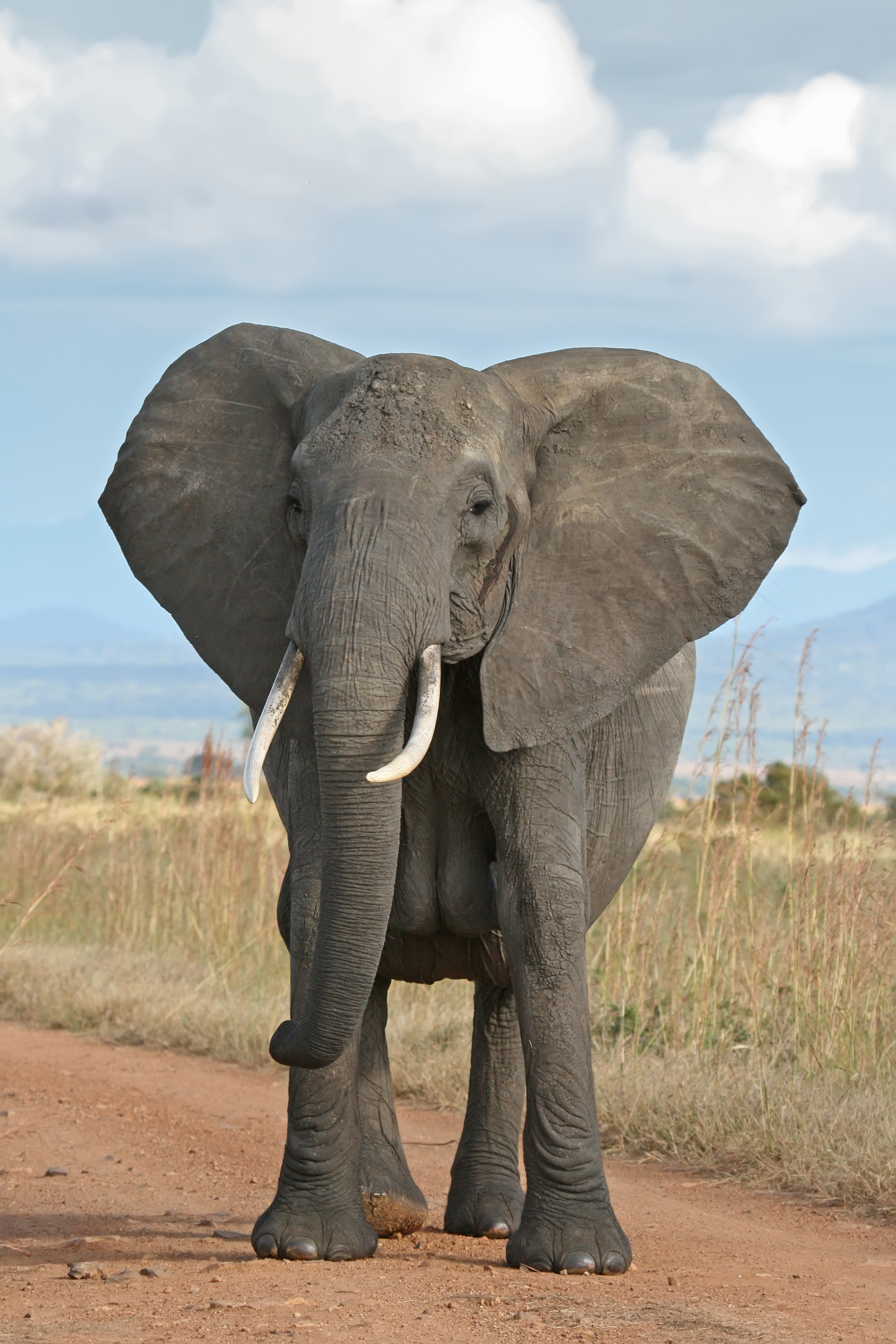
- Context: nature conservation
- Effective: 22 November 2005
- Signatories: Benin; Burkina Faso; Côte d’Ivoire; Guinea; Guinea-Bissau; Liberia; Mali; Niger; Nigeria; Sierra Leone; Togo; Senegal; Ghana
- Languages: English and French

The Memorandum of Understanding (MoU) concerning Conservation Measures for the West African Populations of the African Elephant is a Multilateral Environmental Memorandum of Understanding and was launched under the auspices of the Convention on Migratory Species of Wild Animals (CMS), also known as the Bonn Convention, on 22 November 2005, in close cooperation with the African Elephant Specialist Group (AfESG) of the IUCN Species Survival Commission (IUCN/SSC). The MoU covers thirteen range States (Benin, Burkina Faso, Côte d'Ivoire, Guinea, Guinea-Bissau, Liberia, Mali, Niger, Nigeria, Senegal, Sierra Leone and Togo), all of which have signed the MoU.

== Development of MoU ==
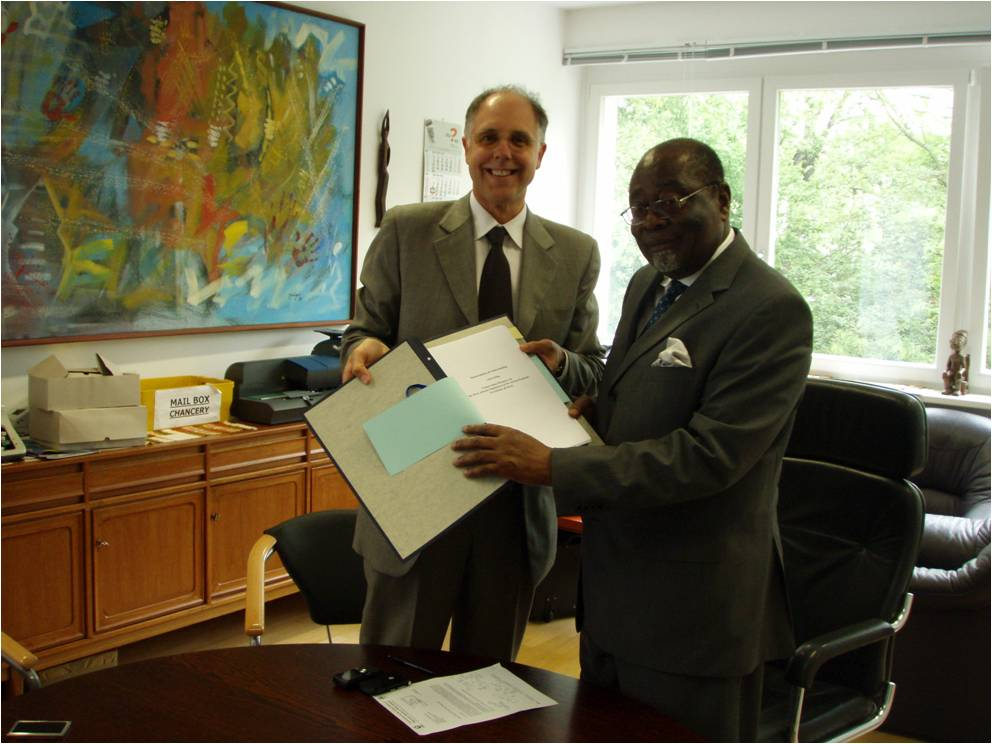
Signing of the West African Elephant MoU by Ghana, May 2007

Noting the important ecological role the African Elephant (Loxodonta africana) plays in both savannah and forest ecosystems and acknowledging that demographic pressure and the development of human activities have significantly reduced the African Elephant’s habitat endangering populations across West Africa, an Article IV agreement was concluded and came into effect on 22 November 2005, after signature by the third range State.

Signatories to the West African Elephant MoU:

- Benin (22 November 2005)
- Burkina Faso (22 November 2005)
- Côte d'Ivoire (22 November 2005)
- Guinea (22 November 2005)
- Guinea-Bissau (22 November 2005)
- Liberia (22 November 2005)
- Mali (22 November 2005)
- Niger (22 November 2005)
- Nigeria (22 November 2005)
- Sierra Leone (22 November 2005)
- Togo (22 November 2005)
- Senegal (8 January 2007)
- Ghana (30 May 2007)

In addition, two organizations have signed the MoU:

- CMS Secretariat (22 November 2005)
- IUCN/SSC (22 November 2005)

== Aim of MoU ==
As the world’s largest terrestrial animal, the elephant has acted as a symbol of Africa. In recent times however, the West African populations have become extremely vulnerable, mostly as the result of illegal killing, loss of habitat and human-elephant conflicts. The MoU aims to protect the West African Elephant populations by providing an international framework for range State governments, scientists and conservation groups to collaborate in the conservation of the species and its habitat.

== Species covered by MoU ==
The MoU protects only the West African populations of the African Elephant, Loxodonta africana. At the Second Meeting of Signatories to the MoU a discussion took place whether to extend the MoU to encompass Elephant populations in Central Africa. It was however decided that it would be preferable for each sub-region to be covered by a separate MoU.

== Fundamental components ==
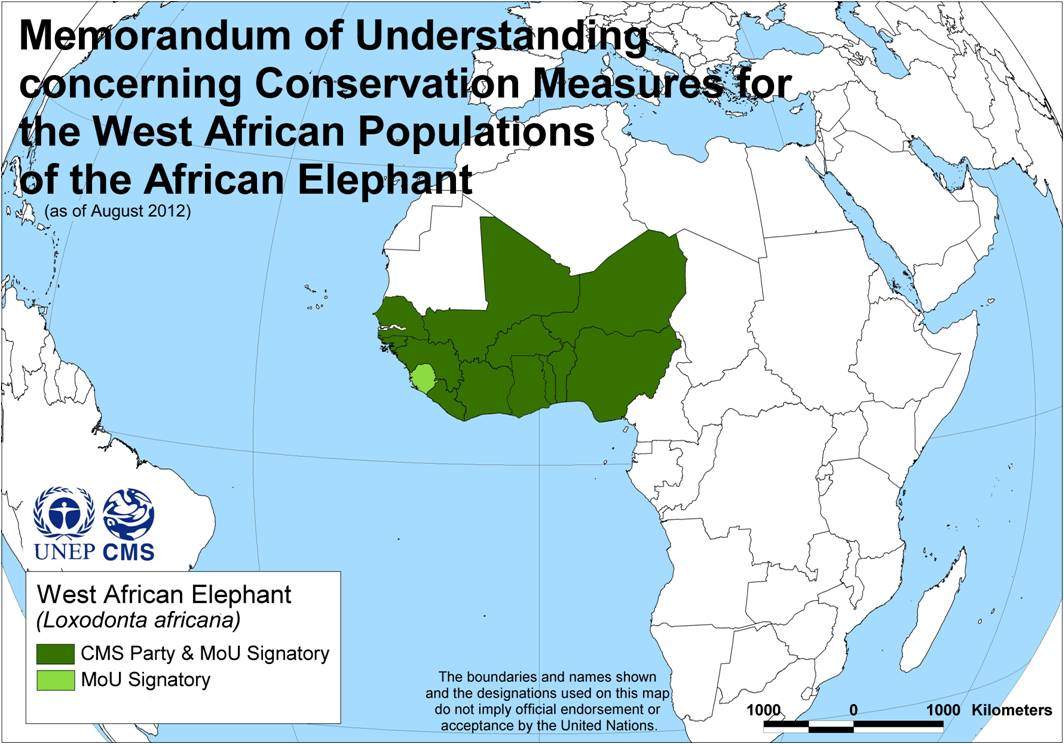
Map of Signatories to the West African Elephant MoU, as of 15 August 2012

Realizing that actions must be taken immediately to prevent the disappearance of the remaining populations of the West African Elephant, the Signatories decide to work closely together to improve the conservation status of the species and its habitat. To this end they will, individually or collectively:

1. Take steps to conserve and, when and where appropriate, to strictly protect the African Elephant and to conserve and sustainably use the habitats essential for its survival
2. Review and, if required, update, applicable national legislation, and ratify or accede to the most relevant international conventions addressing the African Elephant’s conservation, in order to reinforce the species’ protection, particularly with regard to domestic and international trade in ivory
3. Implement in their respective countries the Strategy annexed to the MoU
4. Facilitate the rapid exchange of scientific, technical and legal information necessary to coordinate conservation measures and to cooperate with recognized experts of the IUCN/SSC AfESG, other international organizations and other range States so as to facilitate their work conducted in relation to the Strategy
5. Assess the implementation of the MoU and Strategy at regular meetings
6. Provide the CMS Secretariat at least every two years with a report on implementation of the MoU in each of their respective countries

The MoU took effect after the signature by the third range State (22 November 2005) and will remain in effect indefinitely subject to the right of any Signatory to terminate its participation by providing one years’ written notice to all the other Signatories.

== Meetings ==
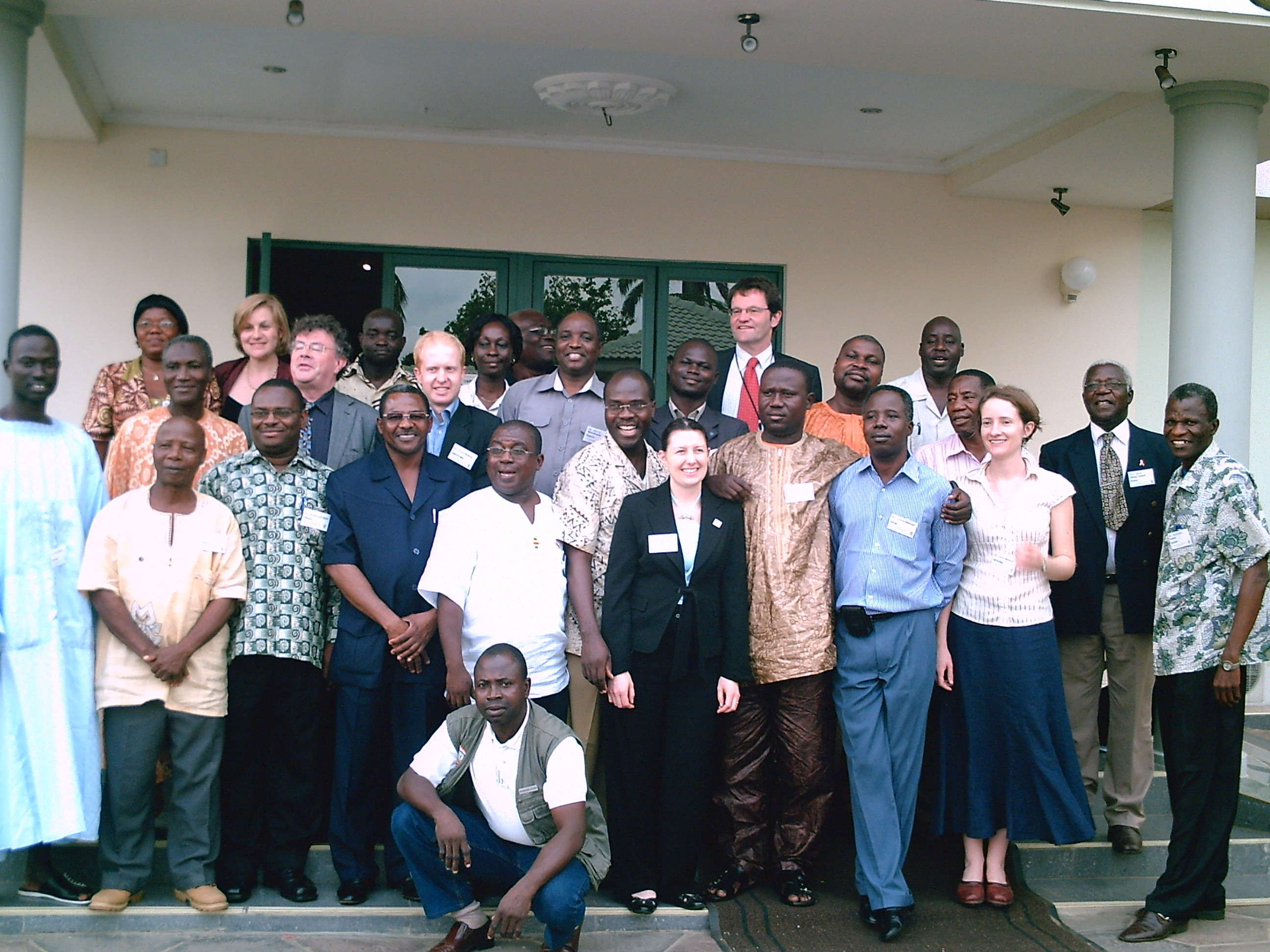
First Meeting of Signatories to the West African Elephant MoU, Acrra, Ghana, 30–31 March 2009

Meetings of Signatories are organized on a regular basis to review the conservation status of the West African Elephant and the implementation of the MoU and Strategy. National reports by individual Signatories and a report prepared by the secretariat are also submitted.

The First Meeting of Signatories took place in Accra, Ghana, 30–31 March 2009. During the meeting the following points were addressed:

- Implementation of the Strategy
- Development of scientific, technical and administrative exchanges
- Regular evaluation of the implementation of the MoU, including the regular distribution of reports on its implementation at a national level

The Second Meeting of Signatories took place in Niamey, Niger, 20–21 June 2011. This meeting reviewed the species’ status and MoU implementation activities in each country. Furthermore, the need to rationalize taxonomy and species lists in the CMS and CITES annexes was highlighted. Moreover, a Medium Term Work Programme was approved, including national action annexes and 12 transboundary projects. Finally the meeting discussed whether to extend the MoU to encompass Elephant populations in Central Africa, but decided it would be preferable for each sub-region to be covered by a separate MoU.

== Secretariat ==
The CMS Secretariat – located in Bonn, Germany – acts as the secretariat to the MoU. The secretariat organizes the regular meetings and provides overview reports compiled on the basis of information at its disposal.

== Strategy ==
The AfESG, the technical advisor to the MoU, started its work in the 1970s. WWF and AfESG developed the Strategy for the Conservation of West African Elephants in 1999. The AfESG Strategy was appended to the MoU and forms an action-oriented basis for ongoing conservation efforts. The Strategy to conserve elephants and their habitats in West Africa has three main components:

- Better understand the status of elephants
- Maintain and possibly increase the numbers
- Improve elephant habitats

To do this, governments and organizations want to better understand and control the ivory trade, reduce the rate of habitat loss, curtail the illegal killing of elephants, work on collecting better information to improve understanding of elephant conservation, improve cooperation and other activities.

== Activities and Successes ==
Different activities have taken place in each of the range States. These include surveys, monitoring, revision and enforcement of laws, ivory marking and identification systems, training of customs officials, creation of new protected areas and transboundary migration corridor management schemes, public awareness and education campaigns, creation of alternative revenue-generating activities, addressing elephant-human conflict situations by the cultivation and use of deterrent hot peppers, and provision of compensation for crop damage. Additional successes include former poachers in Senegal turning to work as park rangers and police informers, strong community support for elephant conservation in the same country, and a significant airport seizure of elephant products in Mali.
