= Memorandum of Understanding on the Conservation of Migratory Birds of Prey in Africa and Eurasia =

Non-binding international agreement

The Memorandum of Understanding on the Conservation of Migratory Birds of Prey in Africa and Eurasia (a.k.a. the Raptors MoU) is an international, legally non-binding agreement to protect migratory birds of prey.

== Ecological importance and threats ==
Hawks, eagles, falcons and owls can function as indicator species of the ecological condition of a region. As they are at the top of the food chain, these species may be among the first to be affected by environmental pressures such as drought, habitat degradation, and the use of pesticides.. Monitoring the population trends of birds of prey, therefore, is a cost-effective method of tracking environmental change.Their slow reproduction rate makes them also particularly exposed to the impact of persecution, (illegal killing, poisoning and trapping).

Raptors can play an important role in ecological health—they may help to control insects and rodents, stabilize predator-prey dynamics and mitigate health risks to humans and other animals by removing carrion (e.g. vultures).

Major threats to birds of prey include the use of pesticides and lead shot, collision with overhead power lines and wind turbines, habitat destruction, poaching and illegal trapping, and illegal trade.

== Signatories and countries covered ==
As of late 2015, there were 61 Signatories to the agreement: Angola, Armenia, Belgium, Burkina Faso, Burundi, Chad, Comoros, Congo (Brazzaville), Côte d'Ivoire, Croatia, the Czech Republic, the Democratic Republic of the Congo (Kinshasa), Denmark, Djibouti, Egypt, Equatorial Guinea, Ethiopia, the European Union, Finland, France, Gambia, Germany, Ghana, Guinea, Hungary, India, Iran, Israel, Italy, Jordan, Kenya, Lebanon, Libya, Luxembourg, Madagascar, Mali, Monaco, Mongolia, Morocco, Nepal, Netherlands, Niger, Norway, Pakistan, Portugal, Romania, Saudi Arabia, Senegal, Slovakia, Somalia, South Africa, Spain, Sudan, Sweden, Switzerland, Syria, Togo, Tunisia, the United Arab Emirates, the United Kingdom, and Yemen.

Other countries where species covered by the agreement occur include: Afghanistan, Albania, Algeria, Andorra, Austria, Azerbaijan, Bahrain, Bangladesh, Belarus, Benin, Bhutan, Bosnia and Herzegovina, Botswana, Bulgaria, Burkina Faso, Cabo Verde, Cameroon, the Central African Republic, China, Cyprus, Eritrea, Estonia, Eswatini, Gabon, Georgia, Greece, Guinea-Bissau, Iceland, Iraq, Ireland, Kazakhstan, Kuwait, Kyrgyzstan, Latvia, Lesotho, Liberia, Liechtenstein, Lithuania, Malawi, Malta, Mauritania, Mauritius, Montenegro, Mozambique, Namibia, Nigeria, North Macedonia, Oman, Poland, Qatar, the Republic of Moldova, the Russian Federation, Rwanda, San Marino, São Tomé and Príncipe, Serbia, Seychelles, Sierra Leone, Slovenia, South Sudan, Sri Lanka, Est, Tajikistan, Macedonia, Türkiye, Turkmenistan, Uganda, Ukraine, Tanzania, Uzbekistan, Zambia and Zimbabwe.

== See also ==
- Raptor conservation
- Bird migration
- Bonn Convention
- Highly migratory species
- Ramsar
