= Agreement on the Conservation of Seals in the Wadden Sea =

Agreement between Wadden Sea countries

Wadden Sea Seals Agreement
Agreement on the conservation of seals in the Wadden Sea
- Signed: 16 October 1990
- Location: Bonn, Germany
- Effective: 1 October 1991
- Condition: Ratification by the 3 signatories
- Signatories: Denmark; Netherlands; Germany
- Depositary: Germany
- Languages: Danish, Dutch, English and German

The Agreement on the Conservation of Seals in the Wadden Sea is an agreement between Wadden Sea countries, aimed at protection of seals and concluded in the aegis of Convention on Migratory Species (CMS) in 1990.

== Seals ==
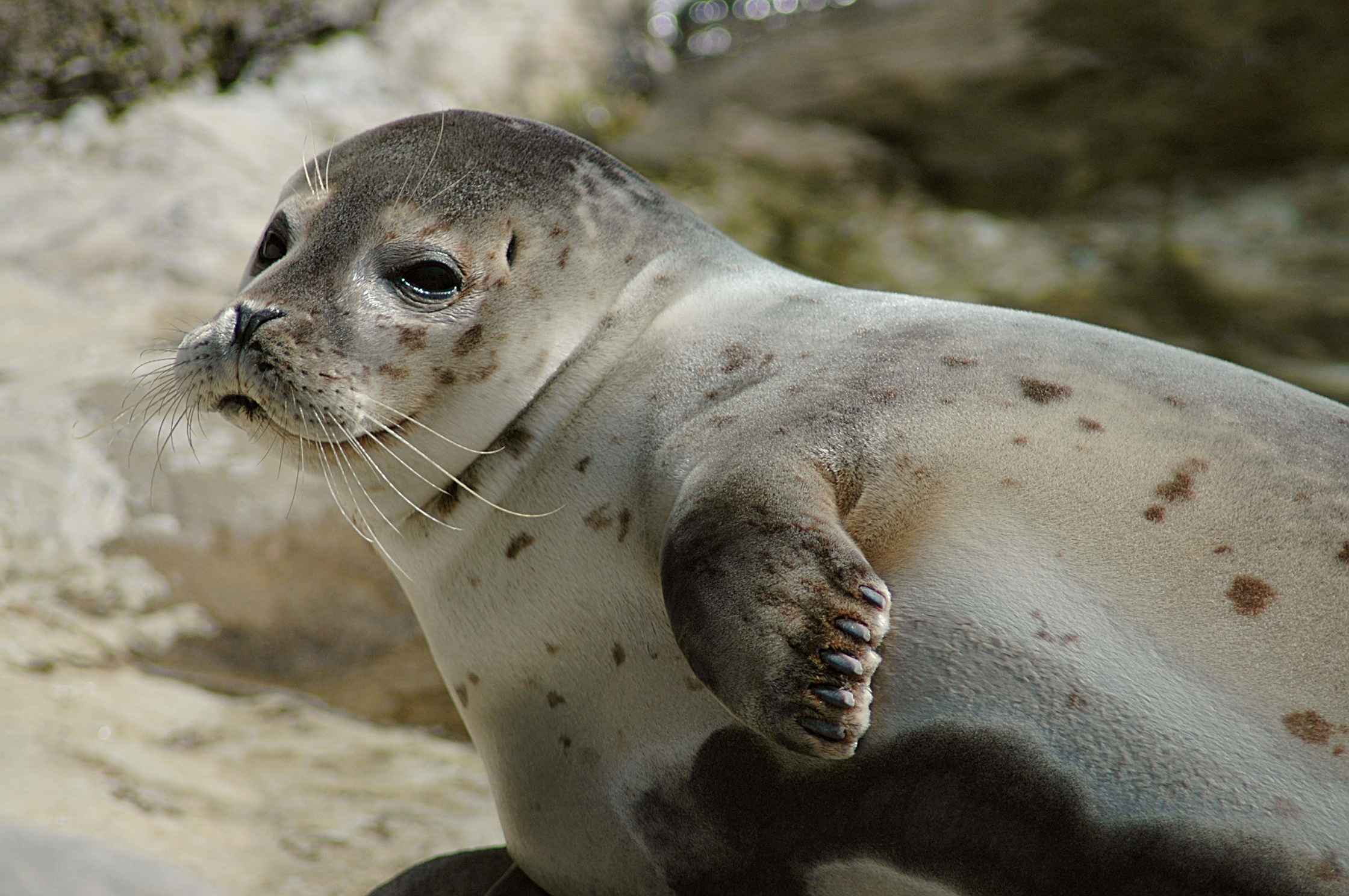
Harbour seal

Common seals, or harbor seals, are nearly threatened true seal species, inhabiting temperate and Arctic marine coastlines of the Northern hemisphere. They are found in coastal waters of the northern Atlantic and Pacific Oceans as well as those of the Baltic and North Seas. Harbor seals are brown, tan, or gray, with distinctive V-shaped nostrils. An adult can attain a length of 1.85 meters (6.1 ft) and a mass of 132 kilograms (290 lbs). Females outlive males (30–35 years versus 20–25 years). Harbor seals stick to familiar resting spots, generally rocky areas where land predators can't reach them, near a steady supply of fish to eat. Their global population is 400,000 to 500,000, and subspecies in certain habitats are threatened. Seal hunting, once a common practice, is now mostly illegal.

== History ==
In 1988, due to an outbreak of the phocine distemper virus, there was a dramatic decline in the population of the Common Seal. The Agreement on Conservation of Seals was signed on 16 October 1990 in Bonn, Germany. It entered into force on 1 October 1991, and population has recovered significantly since then. In 2002, however, the same virus caused another population decline in the North Sea, the Wadden Sea and Kattegat/Skagerrak area.

== Agreement area and members ==
The Agreement was concluded between the Netherlands, Germany and Denmark. The Agreement area includes:

- In the Netherlands: the areas under Key planning Decision Wadden Sea.
- In Germany: the Wadden Sea national parks and the protected areas under the Nature Conservation Act seaward of the main dike and the brackish water limit including the Dollard
- In Denmark: the Wildlife and Nature Reserve Wadden Sea.

The Secretariat of the Agreement is located in Wilhelmshaven, Germany.

== The Seal Management Plan (2002–2006) ==
The Seal Management Plan (2002–2006) contains objectives and action points on habitat protection, research and monitoring, pollution and wardening, taking and public information. The plan is aimed at the Wadden Sea stock of the common seal (Phoca vitulina vitulina) and is also extended to cover the two breeding stocks of the grey seal (Helichoerus grypus) in the Wadden Sea (grey seal is not covered by the Agreement). The overall aim of the plan is to restore and maintain viable stocks and a natural reproduction capacity, including juvenile survival of the common and grey seal. The Plan seeks a balance between conservation and management of the area, and contributing to achieving viable stocks.

== See also ==
- Harbor seal
- List of environmental agreements
- Convention on Migratory Species (CMS)
- Marine Protected Area
