= Ruddy-headed Goose Memorandum of Understanding =

Memorandum of Understanding concerning Conservation Measures for the Ruddy-headed Goose
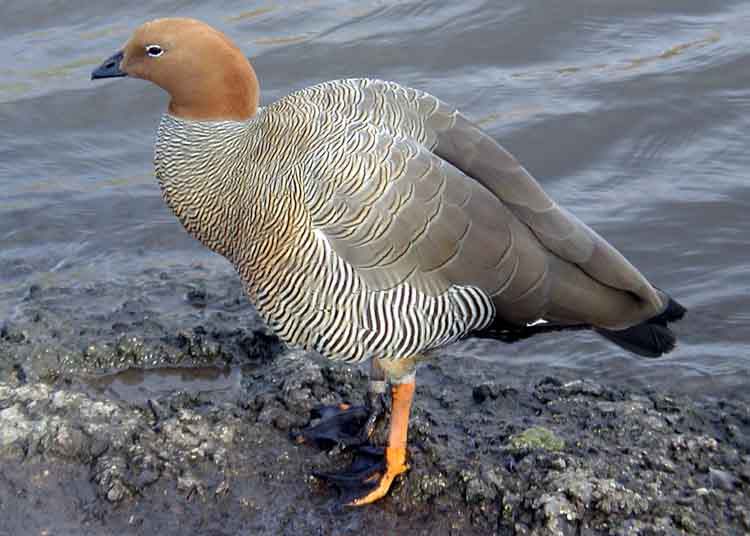
- Effective: 21 November 2006
- Signatories: Argentina; Chile
- Languages: Spanish

The Memorandum of Understanding (MoU) concerning Conservation Measures for the Ruddy-headed Goose is a Bilateral Environmental Memorandum of Understanding between Argentina and Chile and was concluded under the auspices of the Convention on Migratory Species of Wild Animals (CMS), also known as the Bonn Convention. The MoU was concluded as part of the Special Protocol on the Conservation of Wild Fauna and Flora, signed by Argentina and Chile in 2002, and entered into effect on 21 November 2006. It focuses on the protection of the mainland population of the ruddy-headed goose. The MoU is exclusively South American and covers two range States (Argentine Republic and the Republic of Chile), both of which have signed.

== Development ==
To implement the decision of the Conference of the Parties of CMS to list the ruddy-headed goose (Chloephaga rubidiceps) on Appendix I and II of the Convention as a consequence of its endangered status and the conviction that conservation efforts of this species are dependent on collaboration between the two range States, an Article IV agreement was concluded and entered into effect on 21 November 2006.

Signatories to the Ruddy-headed Goose MoU:

- Argentine Republic (21 November 2006)
- Republic of Chile (21 November 2006)

== Aim ==
The continental population of the ruddy-headed goose is migratory and is in imminent danger of extinction because of the small size of its population, its restricted area of distribution, and the numerous threats which it faces in its breeding grounds in the continental area of the Magallanes Region (Chile), in the north of the Tierra de Fuego (Argentina and Chile) and in the wintering grounds in the South of Buenos Aires province (Argentina). Therefore, the MoU aims to safeguard the mainland population of this species, which is in serious danger of extinction with an estimated size at around 900–1,000 individuals.

== Species covered ==
There are two populations of the ruddy-headed goose. The sedentary population is confined to the Falkland Islands/Islas Malvinas while the mainland one migrates between its breeding grounds in southern Patagonia of Chile and Argentina and its wintering quarters in southern Buenos Aires province, Argentina. The MoU protects only the mainland South American population of the ruddy-headed goose.

The ruddy-headed goose, which is the smallest austral goose inhabiting South America, faces several threats such as predation by the South American gray fox, illegal hunting and habitat degradation. Furthermore, the ruddy-headed goose tends to congregate with other species considered pests by farmers and so it has been persecuted in the past, especially in the wintering grounds in the South of Buenos Aires province.

== Fundamental components ==
Conscious of the need to take immediate and concerted measures to prevent the extinction of the continental population of the species, both range States agree to:

1. Provide an effective protection of the continental population of the species in both countries in order to restore its populations to appropriate levels for its survival as well as identify and conserve those habitats which are essential for survival throughout its range
2. Identify and monitor the factors and processes which have a detrimental effect on the conservation status of the species and recommend appropriate measures to regulate, manage and/or control the said factors and processes
3. Elaborate with the support of the Scientific Council of the CMS Convention, an Action Plan
4. Apply the provisions of the Action Plan
5. Facilitate the exchange of scientific, technical and legal information necessary to coordinate conservation measures as well as cooperate with specialists and international organizations in the implementation of the Action Plan
6. Submit, at least annually, a report on the development of the MoU to the CMS Secretaria
7. Hold meetings alternately in the territories of the signatories to review the implementation of the Action Plan

The MoU became effective on 21 November 2006 and is valid for a duration of three years, renewable automatically for a similar term unless one of the two signatories gives three months' prior written notice to the other of its decision to terminate it.

== Workshop and Action Plan ==
In November 2010, a workshop on the conservation of the declining ruddy-headed goose took place in Punta Arenas, Chile. The workshop reviewed the implementation of the MoU in the two countries and revised the bilateral Action Plan. During the workshop, the Action Plan, drawn up in 2009, was revised. The Action Plan provides a road map to guide the implementation of conservation action for the ruddy-headed goose in both countries.

== Secretariat ==
The secretariat functions are provided by the signatories on a rotational base. The CMS Secretariat only acts as depositary to the MoU.

== Activities and successes ==
Several activities have been undertaken in Chile including hunting controls and other protection measures in breeding areas. In Argentina, activities take place in the framework of a national strategy for the conservation and management of the ruddy-headed goose, ashy-headed goose, and the upland goose; and these include an education programme and a monitoring programme in the wintering areas. New regulations approved in Argentina in May 2011 prohibit hunting, capture and trade in respect of five goose species including the ruddy-headed goose.

Wetlands Internationals, CMS and the Dirección de Fauna Silvestre produced a leaflet entitled "El Cauquén colorado – una especie en peligro de extinction" (the ruddy-headed goose – a species in danger of extinction).

Despite a decreasing trend in the density of individuals, the co-organization and participation in workshops and the development of a National Conservation Plan for the species successfully increased cooperation between the MoU's signatories. Also, close work with farmers, government officers and other local stakeholders was vital in reducing the persecution and hunting of the species. Furthermore, the reactivation of a ruddy-headed goose forum, the participation in TV and radio interviews, the printing of brochures and books on the species significantly raised the awareness of the locals of the importance of the RHG in the region.
