= Aquatic Warbler Memorandum of Understanding =

Memorandum of Understanding concerning Conservation Measures for the Aquatic Warbler
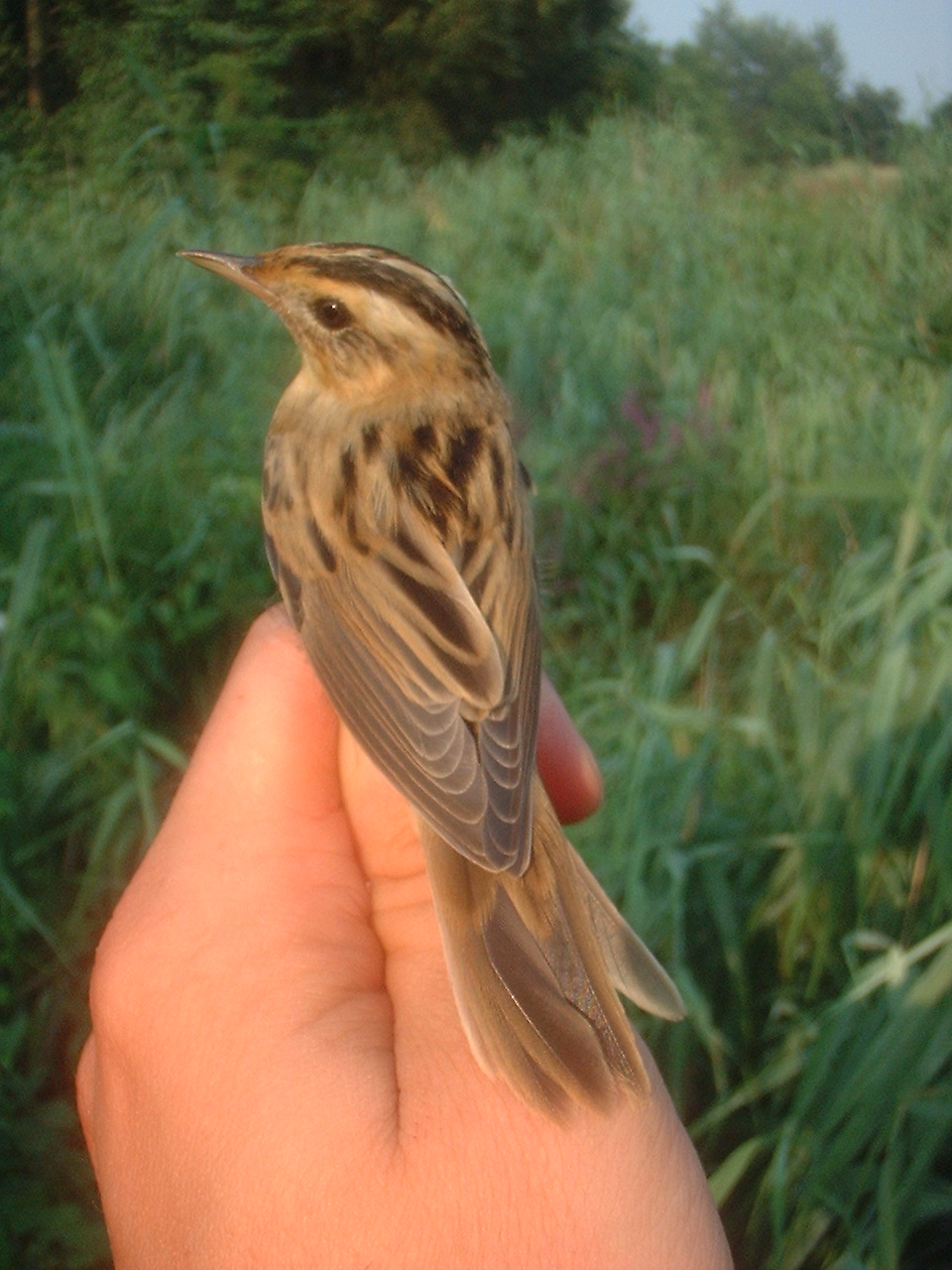
- Context: nature conservation
- Effective: 30 April 2003
- Signatories: Belarus; Bulgaria; Germany; Hungary; Latvia; Lithuania; Senegal; Spain; United Kingdom; Ukraine; Poland; Belgium; France; Mali; Luxembourg; Switzerland
- Languages: English

The Memorandum of Understanding (MoU) concerning Conservation Measures for the Aquatic Warbler is a multilateral environmental memorandum of understanding concluded in 2003 under the auspices of the Convention on Migratory Species of Wild Animals (CMS), also known as the Bonn Convention. This MoU provides the basis for governments, NGO's and scientists to work together to save the aquatic warbler, Europe's rarest songbird. The MoU covers 22 range states (Belarus, Belgium, Bulgaria, France, Germany, Hungary, Latvia, Lithuania, Luxembourg, Mali, Mauritania, Morocco, the Netherlands, Poland, Portugal, Russian Federation, Senegal, Slovakia, Spain, Switzerland, Ukraine and United Kingdom). By August 2012, 16 range states and two cooperating organizations had signed the MoU.

== Development of MoU ==
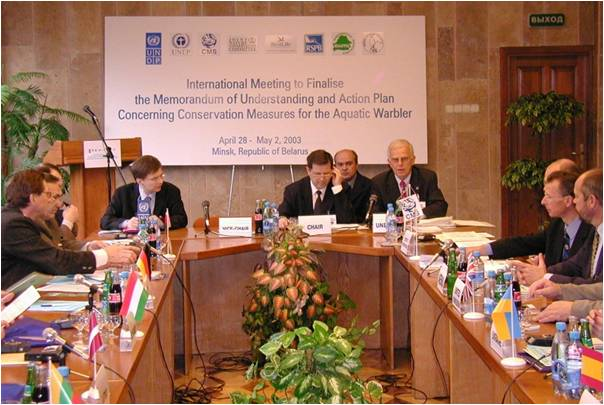
Minsk Meeting 29–30 April 2003

A meeting of the range states of the aquatic warbler was held in Minsk, Belarus, from 29 to 30 April 2003, to negotiate and adopt a MoU and action plan for the conservation of the species. The meeting was co-organized by the CMS Secretariat in cooperation with the United Nations Development Programme (UNDP), the Ministry of Natural Resources and Environmental Protection of Belarus, BirdLife International, the Royal Society for the Protection of Birds (RSPB) and APB-BirdLife Belarus. Representatives from 12 range states were present and the MoU was adopted and entered into effect on 30 April 2003.

Signatories to the Aquatic Warbler MoU:

- Belarus (30 April 2003)
- Bulgaria (30 April 2003)
- Germany (30 April 2003)
- Hungary (30 April 2003)
- Latvia (30 April 2003)
- Lithuania (30 April 2003)
- Senegal (30 April 2003)
- Spain (30 April 2003)
- United Kingdom (30 April 2003)
- Ukraine (21 May 2003)
- Poland (13 July 2004)
- Belgium (24 November 2005)
- France (14 May 2010)
- Mali (14 May 2010)
- Luxembourg (19 July 2010)
- Switzerland (22 November 2011)

In addition, two organizations signed the MoU:

- CMS Secretariat (30 April 2003)
- BirldLife International (30 April 2003)

== Aim of MoU ==
The MoU aims to safeguard the aquatic warbler (Acrocephalus paludicola), a small migratory waterbird that is estimated to have declined sharply at a rate equivalent to 40 per cent in the last 10 years. It reflects the common concern over this dramatic decline and calls for cooperation among national authorities to promote the conservation of the species.

== Species covered by MoU ==
The MoU protects the population of aquatic warblers in all range states. The aquatic warbler is the rarest and the only internationally threatened passerine bird found in mainland Europe. Apart from a very small remnant population in Western Siberia, its breeding grounds are completely confined to Europe. As of May 2010, its global population of only 10,200-13,800 males is confined to less than 40 sites in only six countries, with four sites supporting over 80% of the global population. The main threat the aquatic warbler is facing is the loss of habitat due to the decline of traditional, extensive agriculture and overgrowing of the species' habitat with reeds and bushes or trees.

== Fundamental components ==
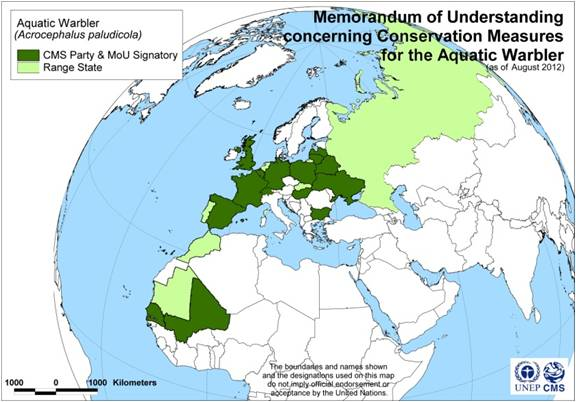
Map of signatories to the Aquatic Warbler MoU, as of 15 August 2012

All signatories decide to work closely together to improve the conservation status of the aquatic warbler throughout its breeding, migrating and wintering range. To that end they will, individually or collectively:

1. Provide strict protection for the aquatic warbler and identify and conserve the wetland habitats essential for its survival
2. Subject to the availability of resources, implement in their respective countries the provisions of the Action Plan annexed to the MoU as a basis for conserving all populations of the species
3. Assess the implementation of the MoU, including the Action Plan, at regular meetings to be attended by representatives of each signatory and persons or organizations technically qualified in the conservation of the species
4. Facilitate the expeditious exchange of scientific, technical and legal information needed to coordinate conservation measures, and cooperate with recognized scientists of international organizations and other range states in order to facilitate their work conducted in relation to the Action Plan
5. Provide the CMS Secretariat at least every two years a report on implementation of the MoU in each of the representative countries

The MoU took effect following the fifth signature (30 April 2003) and will remain in effect indefinitely subject to the right of any signatory to terminate its participation by providing one year's written notice to all to the other signatories.

== Meetings ==
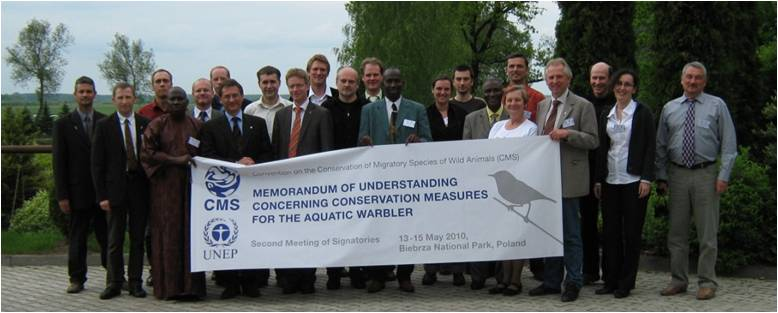
Second Meeting of signatories to the Aquatic Warbler MoU, Biebrza National Park, Poland, 13–15 May 2010

Meetings of signatories are organized regularly to review the conservation status of the aquatic warbler and the implementation of the MoU and Action Plan. National reports from the signatories and an overview report prepared by the secretariat are also submitted.

The First Meeting of Signatories took place in Nationalpark Unteres Odertal, Criewen, Germany, 25–27 June 2006. During this meeting the geographical scope of the MoU was expanded to include Mauritania and Morocco, since these countries seem to be important stop-over sites for the aquatic warbler. Furthermore, the signatories endorsed working further with competent authorities of three countries originally identified as range states – France, the Netherlands and the Russian Federation. The signatories represented at the meeting were Belarus, Belgium, Bulgaria, Germany, Hungary, Latvia, Lithuania, Poland, Senegal, Ukraine and the United Kingdom. France and the Russian Federation, as range states, were also present as well as BirdLife International.

The Second Meeting of Signatories took place in Biebrza National Park, Poland, 13–15 May 2010. At the meeting France and Mali added their signatures and became signatories to the MoU. France is especially important, because the entire world population passes through France once or twice a year, when the birds depend on intact refueling stations. Furthermore, the signatories decided to extend the geographical coverage of the MoU to include an additional seven new countries in Europe and Africa (Luxembourg, Mali, Mauritania, Morocco, Portugal, Slovakia and Switzerland), bringing the range state total to 22. Finally, a new International Species Action Plan for the Aquatic Warbler, prepared by CMS's partner BirdLife International on behalf of the European Union, was adopted. This plan helps to protect the species throughout its range and its breeding populations expand to other sites that had been lost in the past. In addition to giving a detailed account of distribution, biology and conservation status of the bird species, it envisages concrete actions to be taken by the countries. Future project implementation priorities were also discussed, and high among these is the continued search for confirmed wintering sites in sub-Sahelian Africa.

== Secretariat ==
The CMS Secretariat – located in Bonn, Germany – acts as the secretariat to the MoU. Funding for coordination services for the MoU for 2010-2012 has been secured from the government of Switzerland and the RSPB (BirdLife International's partner organization in the UK), with coordination provided by BirdLife through the RSPB and the Belarus BirdLife partner BSPB.

== Action Plan ==
A detailed Action Plan is annexed to the MoU. It summarizes the distribution, biology and conservation status of the species, and describes precise actions to be taken by relevant countries. The main objective of the Action Plan is to maintain the aquatic warbler throughout its range and, in medium to long term, promote the expansion of the breeding population to other suitable areas. Actions to be taken by the signatories can be summarized in four categories:

- Legislative measures to ensure the species' conservation
- Species and habitat protection
- Monitoring and research
- Establishment of a public awareness strategy

== News ==
In 2007, a BirdLife International team discovered a key site within the aquatic warbler's wintering grounds in West Africa, which was completely unknown until then. The Djoudj National Park in northwest Senegal and its surroundings are believed to hold up to a third of the world population.

The Polish BirdLife partner led a major project from 2005 to 2011, funded largely by the European Union's LIFE Nature programme, to restore 42,000 ha of the aquatic warbler's peatland habitat in Poland and Germany. The project's main objective is to establish the population of aquatic warbler in key areas of its range and aims to improve and increase the habitats at the most important sites of the species in Biebrza, Poland and to prevent the extinction of the genetically distinct remnant population in Pomerania, Germany. Its aim is to raise awareness of authorities, key stakeholders and the local public of the conservation needs of the species and its specific habitat requirements. The project wanted to create 1,500 ha of new potential habitat in Pomerania and Biebrza and implement restoration actions on another 1,500 ha with the aim of obtaining an increase of 15 per cent in the species population. Measures to be implemented include hydrological management, removal of shrubs and overgrowth from wet meadows and mires and initiation of extensive grazing and considerate mowing of aquatic warbler habitats. The project ended in November 2011 and a report with the major achievements was published. These achievements were:

- Obtained knowledge on the exact habitat requirements by monitoring nine project sites
- Introduction of new management technology, such as a prototype mowing machine
- Active conservation work, such as mowing and introducing extensive grazing by a small herd of Polish Konik horses
- Arranging for financial support, such as attractive packages made available to Polish farmers; under these schemes the farmers are paid to resume extensive management on areas they had previously given up
- Making land available for conservation work
- Ensuring ongoing management in the long term

At the beginning of 2012 some disturbing news about the aquatic warbler population was reported. In 2012 the population was severely affected by the breeding sites in Europe rapidly overgrowing with reeds and the wintering grounds in Africa affected by droughts, therefore causing an unprecedented crash. The latest monitoring results, conducted by The BirdLife International Aquatic Warbler Conservation Team (AWCT), showed decrease of approximately one-third in each of the countries where the species breed (Lithuania, Poland, Belarus and Ukraine). One exception was the sustainably managed areas in the Biebrza National Park in Poland where the population remained stable.
