= Mediterranean Monk Seal Memorandum of Understanding =

2007 memorandum between Mauritania, Morocco, Portugal, and Spain

Memorandum of Understanding concerning Conservation Measures for the Eastern Atlantic Populations of the Mediterranean Monk Seal
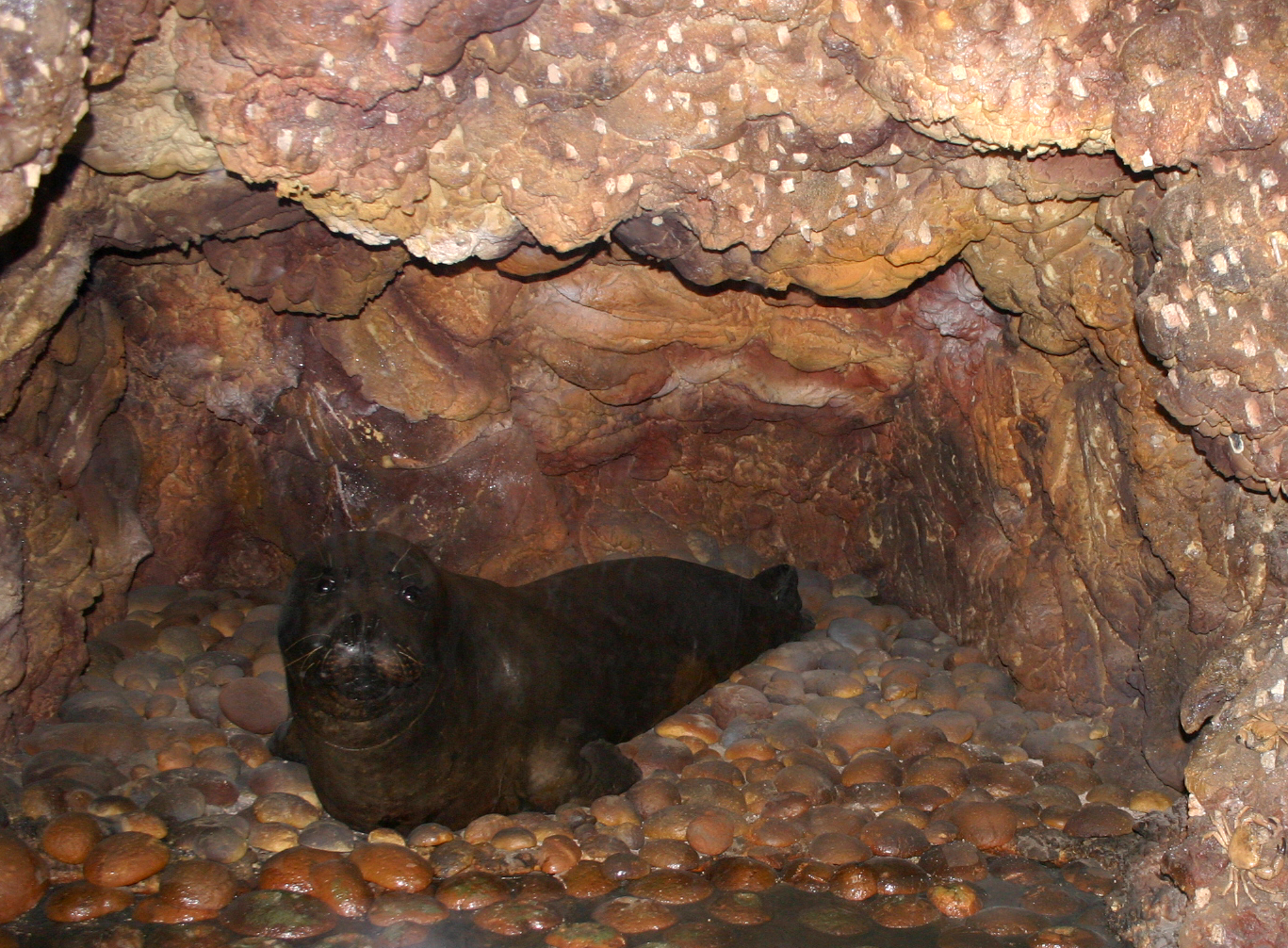
- Effective: 18 October 2007
- Signatories: Mauritania; Morocco; Portugal; Spain
- Languages: Arabic, English, French, Spanish and Portuguese

The Memorandum of Understanding concerning Conservation Measures for the Eastern Atlantic Populations of the Mediterranean Monk Seal is a multilateral environmental memorandum of understanding (MoU) and entered into effect on 18 October 2007, under the auspices of the Convention on Migratory Species of Wild Animals (CMS), also known as the Bonn Convention. It focuses on the protection of the eastern Atlantic populations of the Mediterranean monk seal. The MoU covers four range states (Mauritania, Morocco, Portugal and Spain), all of which have signed.

== Development of MoU ==
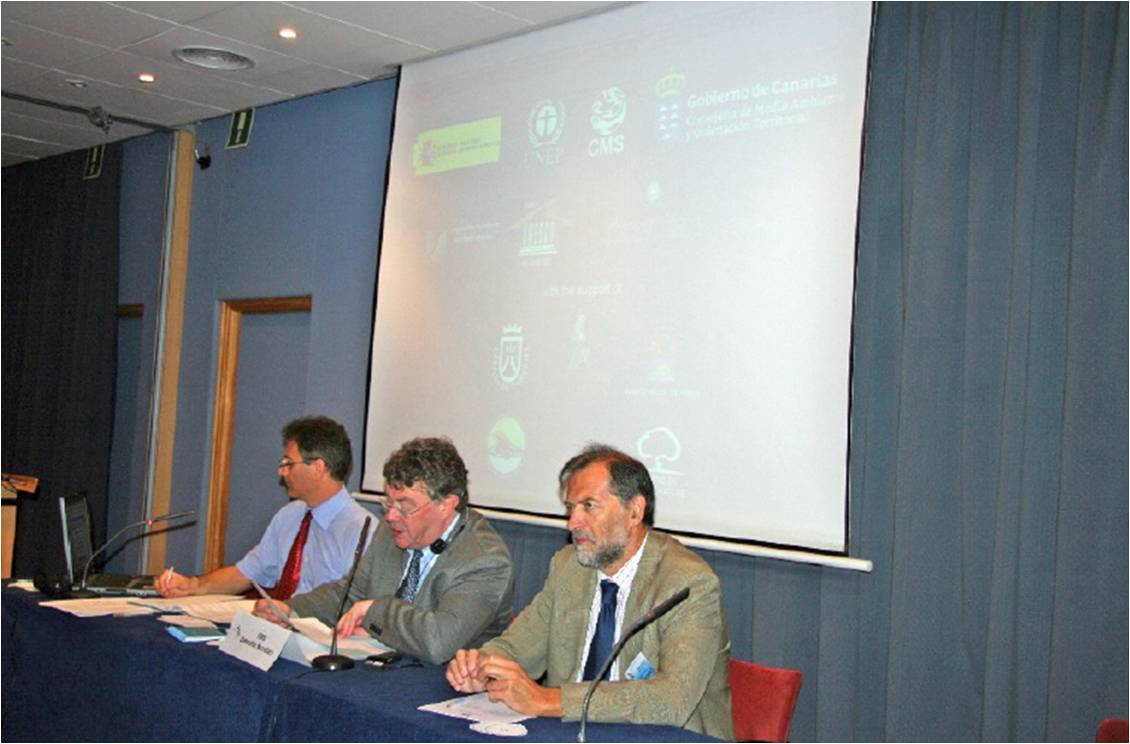
Signing of the Mediterranean Monk Seal MoU, Adeje, Spain, 18 October 2007

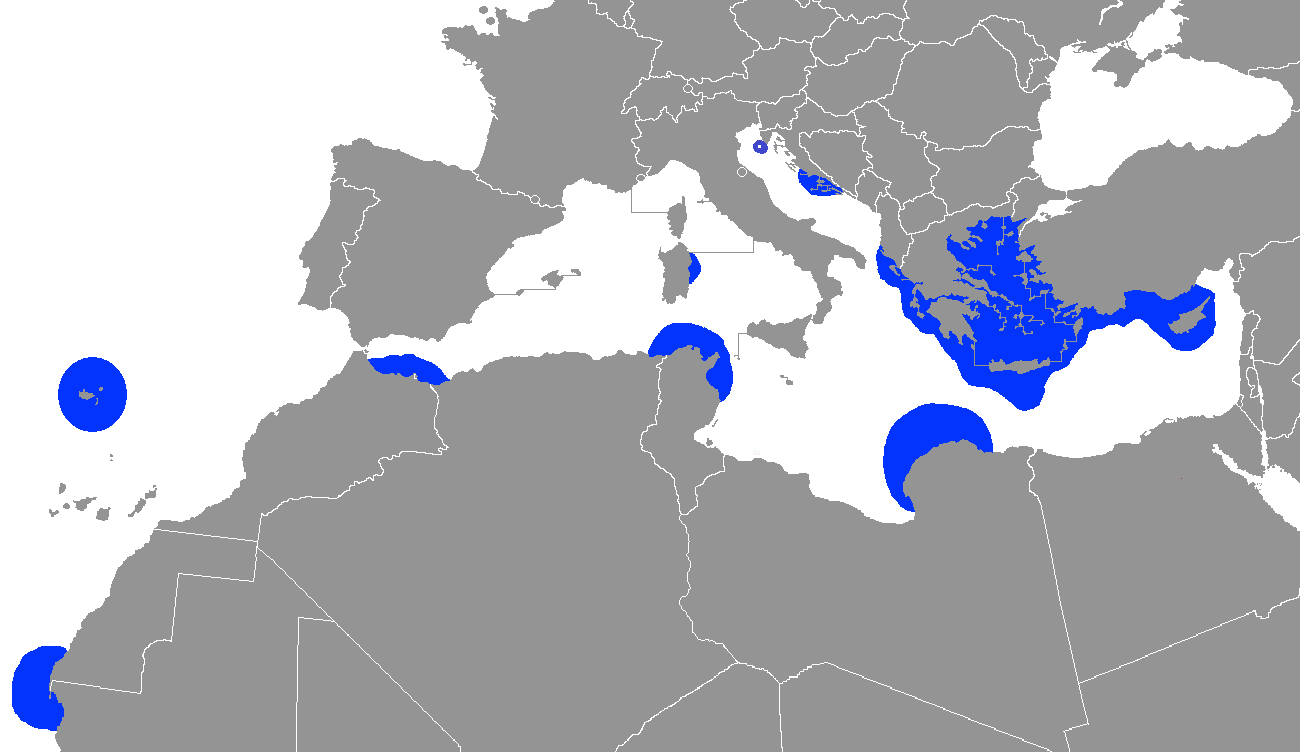
Monk seal distribution

Recalling that the Mediterranean monk seal (Monachus monachus) is included in both Appendix I and II of CMS, thus highlighting the need for concerted action and international cooperation among the range states and noting the important ecological role the monk seal plays, an Article IV agreement was signed in Adeje, Tenerife, Spain on 18 October 2007, in the margins of the CMS meeting on Western African Talks on Cetaceans and their Habitats (WATCH) and came into effect immediately. The agreement is open for signature to all the Atlantic range states.

Signatories to the Mediterranean Monk Seal MoU:

- Mauritania (18 October 2007)
- Morocco (18 October 2007)
- Portugal (18 October 2007)
- Spain (18 October 2007)

In addition, the CMS Secretariat also signed the MoU (18 October 2007).

== Aim of MoU ==
The MoU is a significant step towards improving the conservation status and the habitat of the eastern Atlantic monk seal throughout its range in cooperation with the four signatories. It aims at providing a legal and institutional framework for the implementation of the Action Plan for the Recovery of the Mediterranean Monk Seal in the Eastern Atlantic.

== Species covered by MoU ==
The MoU covers the eastern Atlantic populations of the Mediterranean monk seal as one of the most threatened marine mammals in the world and listed as critically endangered on the IUCN Red List. It is estimated that only 500 specimens remain in the wild. The main threats to the seals are entanglement and mortality in fishing gear, overfishing and direct persecution form humans as well as natural factors like toxic phytoplankton Toxigenic Phytoplankton and the deterioration of breeding sites, such as collapsing caves roofs. The isolation of the small remaining populations – experts believe that the two colonies (one on Madeira and the other on the Cabo Blanco peninsula) do not interbreed – means that the species’ survival is precariously balanced.

== Fundamental components ==
Recognizing that the Mediterranean monk seal is one of the most threatened animals in the world and understanding that the species performs long movements, which makes the survival of the individuals dependent upon the conservation of habitats in the coastal and marine area of all the range states, the signatories decide to work closely together to improve the conservation status of the species and its crucial habitat throughout its range. To this end they will, individually or collectively:

1. Take steps to conserve and, when and where appropriate, to strictly protect the monk seal and to conserve and promote the sustainable use of the habitats essential for its survival
2. Take steps to ratify the most relevant international conventions addressing monk seal’s conservation, in order to reinforce the species’ protection
3. Implement in their respective countries the provisions of the Action Plan annexed to the MoU as a basis for conserving all populations of the species in the eastern Atlantic
4. Facilitate through the Atlantic Monk Seal Working Group, the rapid exchange of scientific, technical and legal information necessary to coordinate conservation measures and to cooperate with recognized experts and scientist, other international organizations and other range states so as to facilitate their work conducted in relation to the MoU and Action Plan
5. Assess the implementation of the MoU and Action Plan at regular meetings
6. Provide the CMS Secretariat at least every two years with a report on implementation of the MoU in each of their respective countries.

The MoU came into effect immediately (18 October 2007) and will remain in effect indefinitely subject to the right of any signatory to terminate its participation by providing one year’s written notice to all of the other signatories.

== Action Plan and Working Group ==
The text of the MoU states that the Action Plan will include measure to:

- Evaluate the status and threats of monk seals
- Maintain and increase monk seal populations
- Create a network of protected areas for the monk seal
- Promote the regional coordination of actions between the range states

The Action Plan was prepared by the Monk Seal Working Group and approved at the Eighth Meeting of the Conference of the Parties, held in Nairobi, Kenya, November 2005. The plan provides a new focus for monk seal conservation by specifying the commitment of the countries in the species’ distribution range. It lays down the procedures to implement coordinated actions among the signatories, providing a means to combine programmes initiated by different national, local and private organizations. The immediate priority is to arrest the decline of the population and then move to promote the species’ recovery. One of the major features of the plan is the proposal to create a network of Special Areas of Conservation for the Monk Seal (SACMS) to help restore populations.Foca monje del Mediterráneo

A Monk Seal Working Group composed of representatives of the four signatory states has been operational since the inception of the MoU and oversees and guides activities undertaken under the MoU and Action Plan. The operation of the Working Group has been financially supported by the Government of Spain, with technical support provided by the Spanish NGO Fundación CBD-Habitat. A meeting of the Working Group in Mauritania in November 2009 agreed some necessary actions, including the identification of relevant competent authorities for the implementation of the MoU, sources of technical advice and options for funding.

== Secretariat ==
The CMS Secretariat – located in Bonn, Germany – provides the secretary functions.

== Successes and news ==
In the framework of the Action Plan, a Nature Reserve was created in the Desertas Islands in the Madeira archipelago. This reserve was crucial in increasing the number of monk seals from 6–8 individuals in the 1980s to 25–30 in 2009. Furthermore, the establishment of a no-fishing zone and the elimination of disturbances in the vicinity of breeding grounds have helped raise the number of monk seals in the Cabo Blanco Peninsula from 100 to 200 in the 1997-2009 period.

In 2009 an event of great symbolic and conservation importance took place in the Cabo Blanco Mediterranean Mons seal colony. A pup was born on an open beach. The newborn pup was discovered by the reserve’s monk seal patrol of the CBD-Habitat Foundation. It is the first record of such an event since the 15th century.

In December 2010, scientist found a colony of rare Mediterranean monk seals at an undisclosed location in Greece.

In March 2011, conservationists rescued a two-month-old Mediterranean monk seal. The seal was later on released in the region of the Alonnisos Marine Park of the Northern Sporades island complex, from where he will begin his journey through the Greek seas.
