= Southern South American Migratory Grassland Bird Species Memorandum of Understanding =

Memorandum of Understanding on the Conservation of Southern South American Migratory Grassland Bird Species and Their Habitats
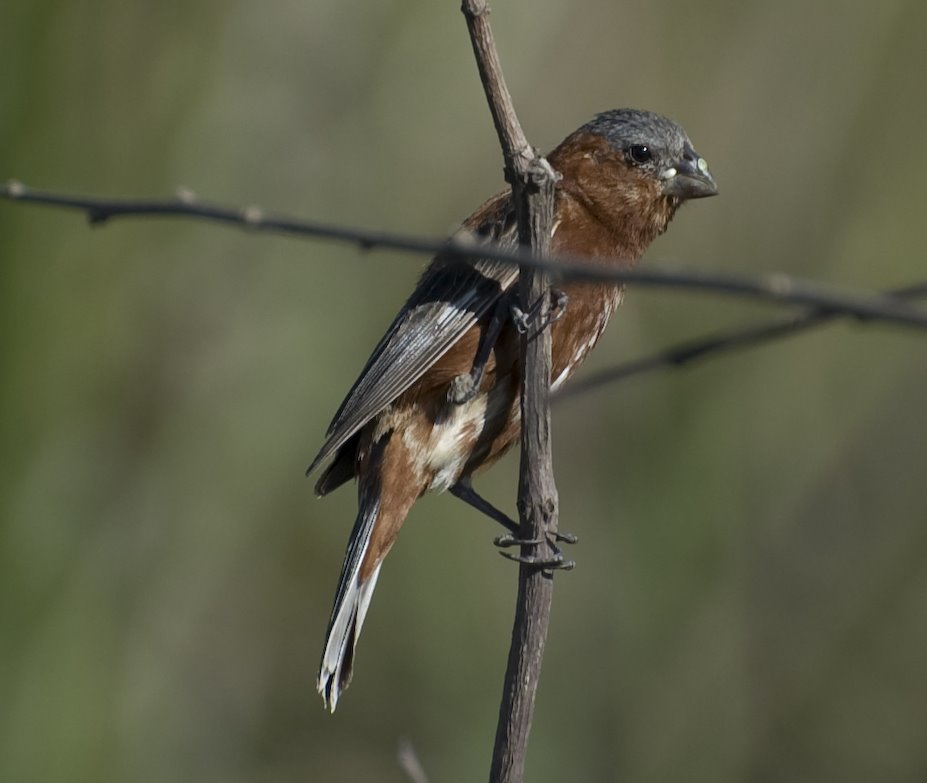
- Effective: 26 August 2007
- Signatories: Argentina; Brazil; Paraguay; Uruguay; Bolivia
- Languages: Spanish and English

The Memorandum of Understanding (MoU) on the Conservation of Southern South American Migratory Grassland Bird Species and Their Habitats is a Multilateral Environmental Memorandum of Understanding concluded under the auspices of the Convention on Migratory Species of Wild Animals (CMS), also known as the Bonn Convention and became effective on 26 August 2007. Under the “umbrella” of the CMS, the governments of Argentina, Bolivia, Paraguay and Uruguay agreed to work together towards better conservation of migratory species of grassland birds of Southern South America. The MoU covers five range States (Argentina, Bolivia, Brazil, Paraguay and Uruguay), all of which have signed.

== Development of MoU ==
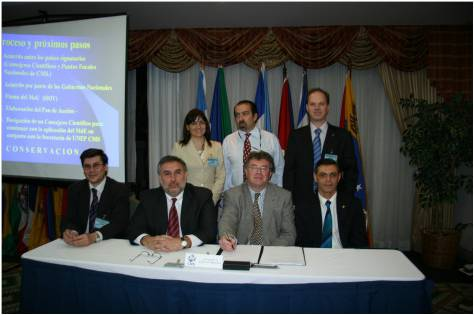
Signing of the South American Grassland Birds MoU, August 2007

The Eight Meeting of the Conference of the Parties to CMS adopted a recommendation calling on range States, regardless of whether they were Parties to CMS, to develop a MoU to help conserve the endangered grassland bird species of South America and the habitats upon which they depend. The governments of Argentina, Bolivia, Paraguay and Uruguay therefore agreed to work together towards better conservation of migratory species of grassland birds and developed the MoU text. Argentina, Paraguay and Uruguay signed the MoU on 26 August 2007. Brazil, although not a Party to CMS, signed the next day. Bolivia was the last of the range States to sign the MoU on 23 September 2009.

Signatories to the Southern South American Migratory Grassland Bird Species MoU:

- Argentina (26 August 2007)
- Brazil (27 August 2007)
- Paraguay (26 August 2007)
- Uruguay (26 August 2007)
- Bolivia (23 September 2009)

In addition, the CMS Secretariat also signed the MoU (26 August 2007).

== Aim of MoU ==
The grasslands of Argentina, Bolivia, Brazil, Paraguay and Uruguay in southern South America represent important habitat to numerous migratory bird species. These birds play vital roles in the ecosystem by dispersing seeds and controlling insect populations. According to the IUCN the global conservation status of many South American grassland species is alarming. The fragmentation, degradation and loss of grassland ecosystems by human activities are key threats to the species populations. These important habitats are being placed at risk by unsustainable agricultural activities, pollution from pesticides and other agrochemicals, conversion to pasture land for cattle, and the transformation of natural grassland into eucalyptus and pine plantations for paper production. The MoU aims to conserve the remaining populations by coordinated and concerted actions in the range States.

== Species covered by MoU ==
The MoU protects the following migratory grassland birds of southern South America:

- Eskimo curlew (Numenius borealis)
- Strange-tailed tyrant (Alectrurus risora)
- Cock-tailed tyrant (Alectrurus tricolor)
- Chestnut seedeater (Sporophila cinnamomea)
- Rufous-rumped seedeater (Sporophila hypochroma)
- Marsh seedeater (Sporophila palustris)
- Zelich's seedeater (Sporophila zelichi)
- Saffron-cowled blackbird (Agelaius flavus)
- Dark-throated seedeater (Sporophila ruficollis)
- Dinelli's doradito (Pseudocolopteryx dinellianus)
- Bearded tachuri (Polystictus pectoralis pectoralis)

== Fundamental components ==
Concerned that the populations of several species of migratory birds inhabiting the grasslands of southern South America have been subject to a drastic reduction and fragmentation of their habitats and have a delicate state of conservation, the Signatories decide to work together to improve the conservation status of the species throughout their breeding and wintering ranges. To this end, they will:

1. Provide effective protection for the populations of migratory grassland birds and for the habitats upon which their survival depends
2. Develop an Action Plan to protect the species and their habitats
3. Assess the implementation of the MoU and Action Plan at regular meetings
4. Provide the CMS Secretariat a regular report on the implementation of the MoU in their respective countries

The MoU came into effect following the third Signature (26 August 2007) and will remain in effect indefinitely subject to the right of any Signatory to terminate its participation by providing one year's written notice to all other Signatories.

== Meetings ==
Meetings of Signatories are organized on a regular basis to review the conservation status of the species and the implementation of the MoU and Action Plan.

The First Meeting of Signatories took place in Asunción, Paraguay, 15 December 2010, with funding and logistical support from Asociación Guyra Paraguay, the national Partner of BirdLife International. During the meeting an Action Plan was adopted and annexed to the MoU. Furthermore, the meeting approved a list of priority activities as recommended by the Technical Meeting. At the meeting a joint offer by BirdLife International and Guyra Paraguay to provide coordination services for the MoU in the future, was accepted.

== Secretariat ==
The CMS Secretariat – located in Bonn, Germany – acts as the secretariat to the MoU.

== Action Plan ==
The First Meeting of Signatories adopted an Action Plan which was added as an Annex to the MoU. The Plan had been drafted at a workshop in Paraguay in September 2010 and finalized at a Technical Meeting immediately prior to the Meeting of the Signatories. The text of the MoU states that the Action Plan should include measures to promote coordination of conservation actions, international cooperation, improving the knowledge on these species, management, research, awareness and the exchange of information among the Signatories. The Action Plan focuses on the identification of new protected areas to create a network of habitats, in addition, it recommends actions to be taken outside of protected areas to help conserve habitat on private lands.
