= Raptor conservation =

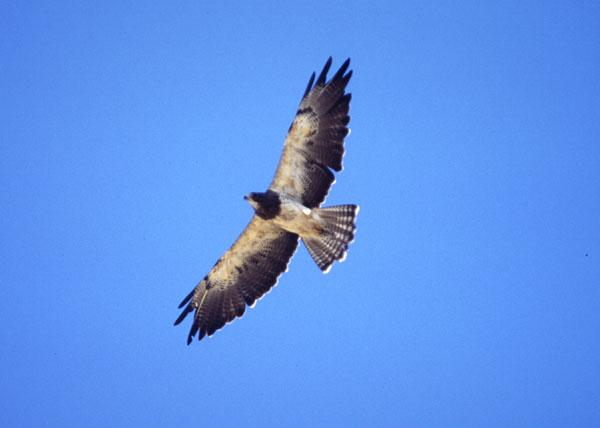
Swainson's Hawk

Raptor conservation concerns are threats affecting the population viability of birds of prey. Because of their hunting lifestyle, raptors face distinct conservation challenges. As top predators, they are important for healthy ecosystem functioning, and by protecting them many other species are safeguarded. Their extensive habitat requirements make regional conservation strategies necessary for protecting birds of prey.

== Pesticides ==
Because they are opportunistic carnivores, birds of prey are at high risk of secondary poisoning by eating organisms that have been killed or debilitated by pesticides. Raptors may be poisoned by legal, labeled use of pesticides or by illegal use. Cases can be identified as abuse if the chemical responsible is prohibited by law or not in use in the affected area. For example, in North America, Golden eagle poisonings are commonly found to be pesticide abuse cases traced to tainted sheep carcasses used to bait and kill coyotes. Common instances of labeled use are consumption of insects or worms that have been sprayed, and ingesting pesticide granules or treated seeds as food. In 1995 three thousand Swainson's hawks were killed in Argentina after they ate insects that had been sprayed.

While most developed nations have adopted standards that reduce usage of chemicals with extended environmental persistence, the pesticides are still powerful and dangerous immediately after application. The United Kingdom owes its small proportion of labeled-use deaths to less toxic pesticides, whereas the United States has near equal amounts of labeled-use to illegal use fatalities. Use of non-granular and untreated seeds would reduce pesticide concentration and accessibility as a food source.

== Lead shot ==
Birds of prey may eat dead or injured prey killed with lead shot or fishing sinkers. Most lead poisonings result from consumption of unretrieved game birds, in addition to downed pests and other game animals. The effects of lead poisoning can include ballooning of the proventriculus, weight loss, anemia, and a drooping posture. Overall lead poisoning increases a bird's risk of predation and the occurrence of starvation and disease, which reduces fitness and reproductive success.

Lead is a persistent environmental contaminant, and as suitable habitat patches diminish, both the concentration of organisms and hunting space increases. Restricting use of lead, especially in wetlands, and switching to non-toxic shot can reduce lead contamination.

== Utility poles ==
There are over 185 million power line poles in the United States, each posing some risk of electrocution. Bird electrocutions are the result of three factors: biology, environment, and engineering. The issue is largely focused on raptors because their size, hunting behaviors, and nesting preferences make them particularly susceptible. Biological and environmental factors that are found to influence risk of electrocution are body size, age, behavior, prey type, habitat, season, and weather. Long-term research has revealed that the issue is not limited to raptors and that the interactions of other species with power poles - specifically those related to perching, roosting, and loafing - can result in power outages and electrocutions. Electrocutions have been reported in more than 30 non-raptor North American species, including ravens and crows, storks, herons, pelicans, gulls, magpies, and jays. Species living in areas devoid of natural perches are also more vulnerable to electrocution as they rely on high points in the environment to hunt from and advertise territory and their choices are often limited to power poles. Additionally, poles atop ridges are especially appealing for raptors, as they afford a wide field of view of the surrounding environment. Placement of poles in prime habitat or along migration routes has caused higher mortality, and rates increase late in the summer during fledging when young, inexperienced birds proliferate. Bathing behavior at times of rain or snow makes birds more conductive to electricity, and orientation of pole cross arms with regard to prevailing winds can increase risk of contact with electrical components depending on ease of take-off and landing.

Over half of North American and a majority of European raptor species have been affected by electrocution. European utility equipment is made of steel, increasing conductivity of the whole structure. While electrocution doesn't threaten the viability of most raptor populations, the whole of human impacts can, so it is sensible to reduce known causes of mortality in any way possible. Burying cables, installing perch deterrents, and attentive placement of poles are ways to reduce risk of death by electrocution.

== Wind turbines ==
Because they hunt on the wing and have wind-specific flight behaviors, raptors are at risk of death from collisions with wind turbines. Red-tailed hawks at the controversial Altamont Pass Wind Resource Area are especially susceptible. The hawks usually hunt from perches but during high winds they hunt while soaring or kiting in place. Soaring on thermals brings them to the same elevation as turbine blades, while at higher winds kiting on slope updrafts can keep birds hovering in place next to a turbine in gusty winds.

Raptors and turbines converge in windy areas, and a balance must be found between wildlife conservation and wind energy. Planning wind farms away from prime habitat, turning off turbines at peak raptor presence and dismantling specific high-risk turbines can prevent raptor deaths.

== See also ==
- Status and conservation of the golden eagle
- Memorandum of Understanding on the Conservation of Migratory Birds of Prey in Africa and Eurasia (Raptors MoU)
