= High Andean Flamingos Memorandum of Understanding =

Memorandum of Understanding on the Conservation of High Andean Flamingos and their Habitats
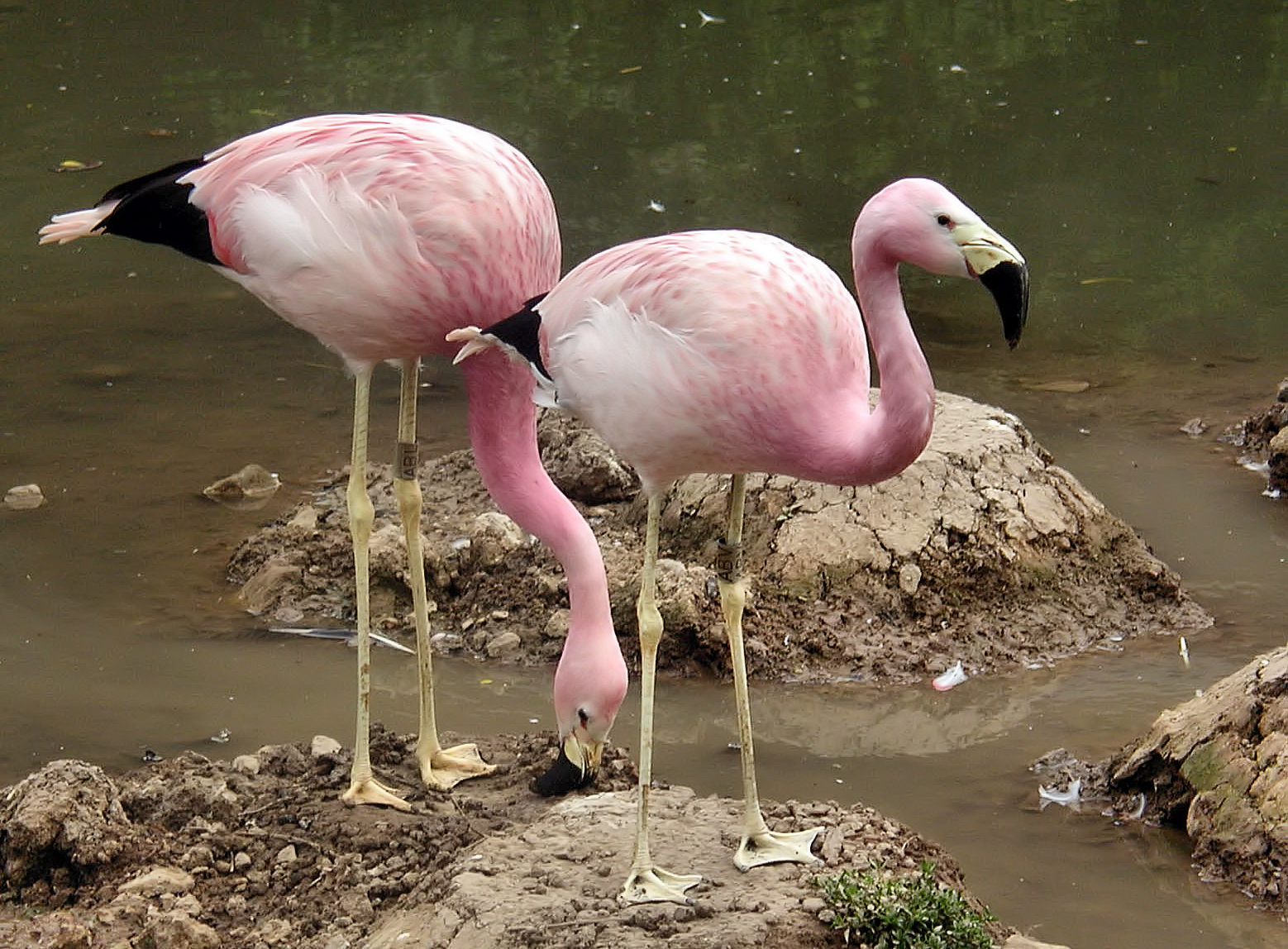
- Context: nature conservation
- Effective: 4 December 2008
- Signatories: Bolivia; Chile; Peru
- Languages: Spanish

The Memorandum of Understanding (MoU) on the Conservation of High Andean Flamingos and their Habitats is a multilateral environmental memorandum of understanding that was concluded under the auspices of the Convention on Migratory Species of Wild Animals (CMS), also known as the Bonn Convention. The MoU came into effect on 4 December 2008 and provides protection for the populations of high Andean flamingos, which have been subject to drastic reduction and fragmentation of their habitats and have a delicate state of conservation. The MoU covers four range states (Argentina, Bolivia, Chile and Peru). As of August 2012, three range states have signed the MoU.

== Development of MoU ==
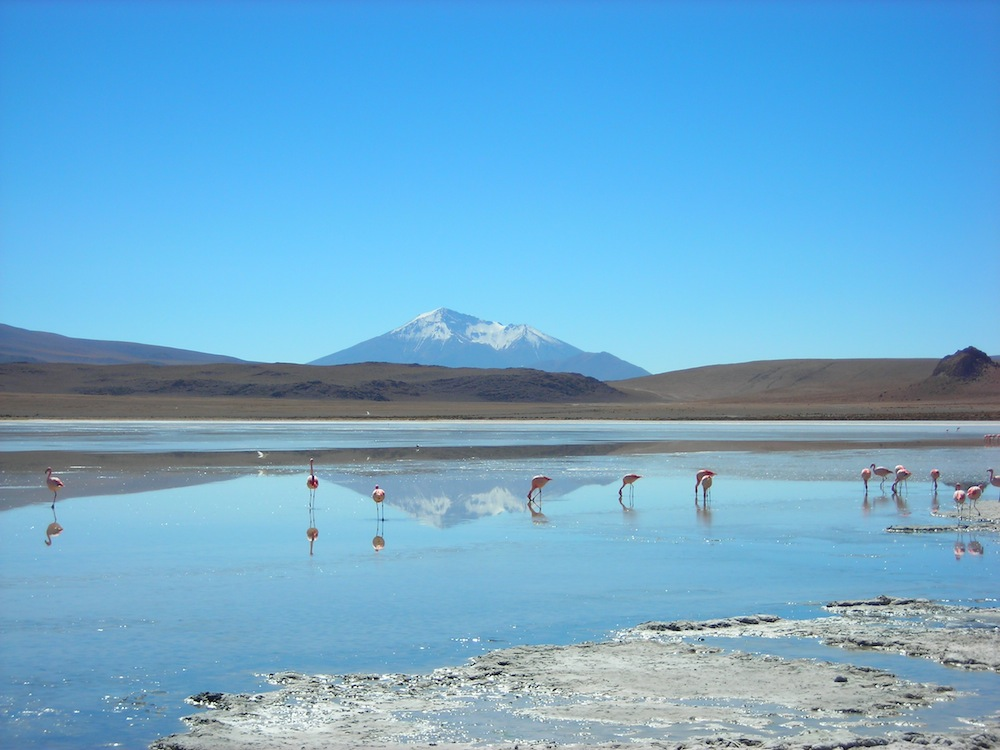
Flamingos foraging in an altiplano lake in Southwest Bolivia

To implement the decision of the Fifth Conference of the Parties of CMS to list the high Andean flamingo (Phoenicopterus andinus and P. jamesi) on Appendix I of the Convention due to its poor state of conservation caused by a drastic reduction and fragmentation of their habitats, an Article IV agreement was concluded and entered into effect on 4 December 2008, following the signature by the third range state.

Signatories to the High Andean Flamingos MoU:

- Bolivia (4 December 2008)
- Chile (4 December 2008)
- Peru (4 December 2008)

In addition, the CMS Secretariat also signed the MoU.

== Aim of MoU ==
Taking into consideration that the major threats that cause the population of the high Andean flamingo are amongst others the fragility of the high Andean wetlands and the impact caused by human activities such as fresh water contamination caused by the mining industry, the overexploitation of ground water, water treatment projects, the modification of natural river courses for agricultural purposes, unregulated tourism, extraction of eggs and destruction of colonies as well as inadequate management of grazing on the flood plains of the high Andean steppes, the MoU aims to improve the conservation status of the species and their habitats through coordinated and concerted actions across the range states.

== Species covered by MoU ==
The MoU protects two species of Andean flamingos, Phoenicopterus andinus and Phoenicopterus jamesi, both listed on Appendix I of the CMS Convention.

== Fundamental components ==
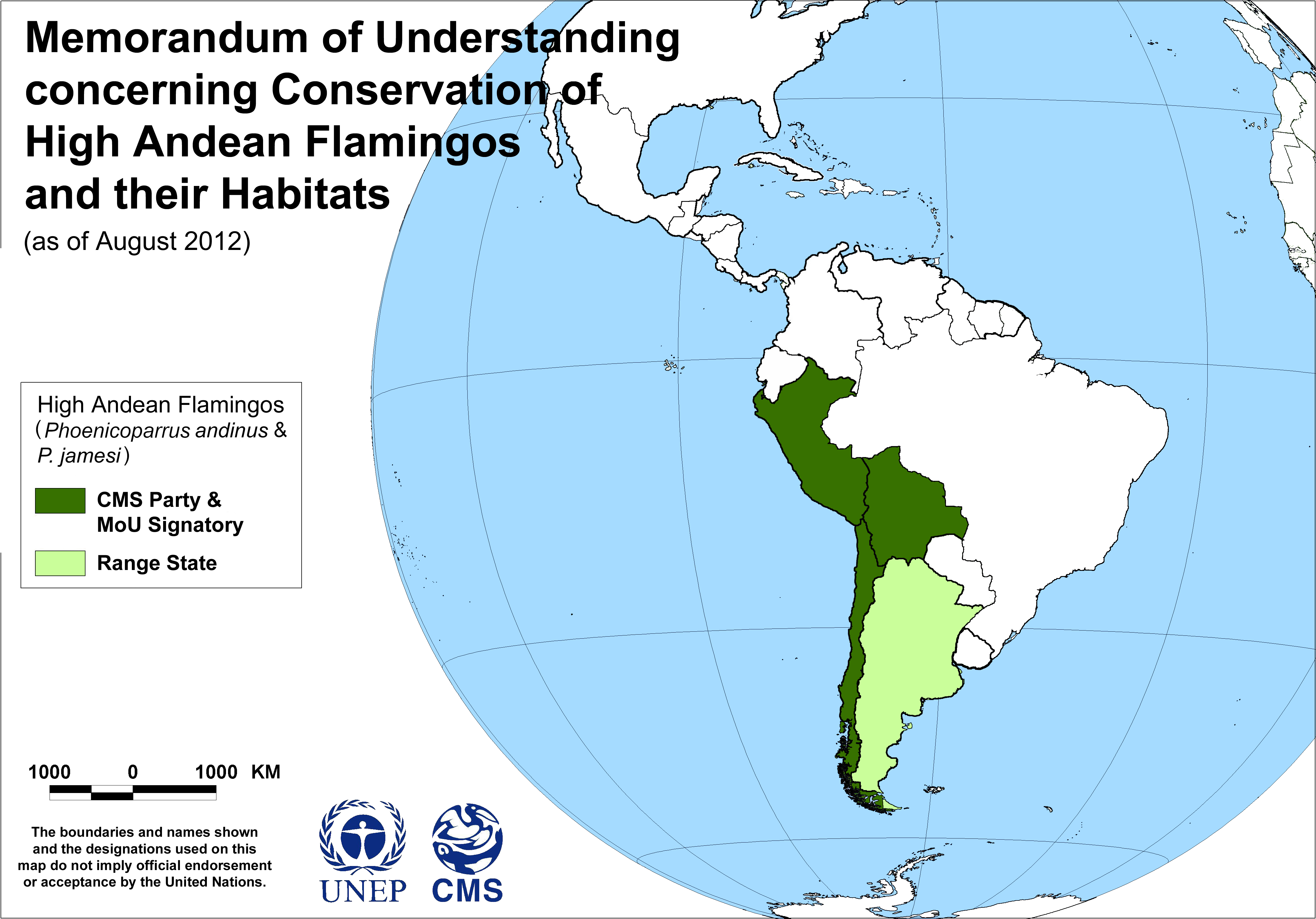
Map of signatories to the High Andean Flamingos MoU, as of 15 August 2012

All signatories agree to undertake steps to conserve the high Andean flamingo throughout their range. To this end they will:

1. Provide effective protection for the population of the high Andean flamingos, and for the habitats upon which they depend to complete their entire lifecycle
2. Develop an action plan to protect the species and their habitats, which will guide the conservation actions of the signatories and, which should include measures to promote co-ordination of these actions, international cooperation, improving the knowledge of the species, management, research, awareness and the exchange of information among the signatories
3. Assess the implementation of the MoU and action plan at regular meetings of representatives of each of the signatories, and persons or organizations technically qualified in the conservation of these species
4. Provide the secretariat with a regular report on their implementation of the MoU and action plan

The MoU took effect immediately after the third signatory (4 December 2008) and will remain in effect indefinitely subject to the right of any signatory to terminate its participation by providing one year's written notice to all other signatories.

== Meetings ==
The secretariat shall convene regular meetings of signatories to review the population status of the high Andean flamingos and assess the implementation of the MoU.

== Secretariat ==
The CMS Secretariat – located in Bonn, Germany – acts as the secretariat to the MoU. The main tasks of the secretariat are organizing the meeting of signatories and providing overview reports of progress made to implement the MoU and its action plan, compiled on the basis of all information available. Furthermore, the secretariat also acts as the depositary.

== Action plan ==
An action plan provides a road map to guide the implementation of conservation actions for the high Andean flamingo in the range states and will be prepared by the signatories, supported by the CMS Secretariat. It will include measures to promote co-ordination of conservation actions, international cooperation, improving the knowledge on the species, management, research, awareness and the exchange of information among the signatories.

== Activities and successes ==
In 2011, CMS and Centro de Estudios en Biología Teórica y Aplicada (BIOTA – Center for Studies in Theoretical and Applied Biology) in Bolivia agreed to cooperate on a large project to monitor the two species of high Andean flamingos (Phonicopterus andinus and Phonicopterus jamesi) within the framework of the MoU and with funding through the CMS Small Grants Programme (SGP). The objective was to monitor population and their breeding colonies in order to know the current conservation status of these populations and establish the trends of the breeding colonies. Furthermore, the data obtained will be the basis for developing a programme to monitor and protect the species in the future. Monitoring activities started in August 2011 to study reproduction and active nesting sites, count the flamingo's breeding colonies in priority sites, and identify the principal threats to their conservation, and ended on 31 May 2012.

The monitoring data obtained suggest breeding success of the high Andean flamingos in Bolivia and Argentina in 2011–2012. Some of the results of the monitoring programme were the following:

- In January 2012, BIOTA and Yuchan Foundation simultaneously carried out a census of both of the above-mentioned flamingo species in the wetlands of Jujuy and Catamarca in Argentina and southwest Potosí in Bolivia, more than 80 sites altogether. The data collected, suggests that these ecosystems were home to 93 per cent of the entire global population of Phonicopterus jamesi flamingos and 48.7 per cent of the entire Phonicopterus andinus population.
- During the November 2011 to April 2012 breeding period, high Andean flamingos were monitored in 28 wetlands of Southwest Potosí, Bolivia, in an area located in the “Los Lípez”, a Ramsar site located between 4,200 and 6,000 metres above sea level on the Bolivian plateau.
- As of February 2012, a total of 16,106 chicks of the two flamingo species were hatched at five lakes (Capina, Khara, Cachi, Colorada and Guayaques), which included 14,697 chicks hatched on Lake Colorada. This supports the assumption that this flamingo breeding period will be quite successful compared with the breeding period 2010-2011 when only 600 juveniles were recorded at Lake Colorada.
