= Range state =

Range state is a term generally used in zoogeography and conservation biology to refer to any nation that exercises jurisdiction over any part of a range which a particular species, taxon or biotope inhabits, or crosses or overflies at any time on its normal migration route. The term is often expanded to also include, particularly in international waters, any nation with vessels flying their flag that engage in exploitation (e.g. hunting, fishing, capturing) of that species. Countries in which a species occurs only as a vagrant or ‘accidental’ visitor outside of its normal range or migration route are not usually considered range states.

Because governmental conservation policy is often formulated on a national scale, and because in most countries, both governmental and private conservation organisations are also organised at the national level, the range state concept is often used by international conservation organizations in formulating their conservation and campaigning policy.

An example of one such organization is the Convention on the Conservation of Migratory Species of Wild Animals (CMS, or the “Bonn Convention”). It is a multilateral treaty focusing on the conservation of critically endangered and threatened migratory species, their habitats and their migration routes. Because such habitats and/or migration routes may span national boundaries, conservation efforts are less likely to succeed without the cooperation, participation, and coordination of each of the range states.
