= Convention on the Conservation of Migratory Species of Wild Animals =

Wildlife conservation treaty

Convention on Migratory Species
Convention on the Conservation of Migratory Species of Wild Animals
- Type: Multilateral
- Context: Wildlife conservation
- Signed: 23 June 1979
- Location: Bonn, West Germany
- Effective: 1 November 1983
- Condition: Ratification by 15 states
- Parties: 130 States + EU: Afghanistan; Albania; Algeria; Angola; Antigua and Barbuda; Argentina; Armenia; Australia; Austria; Bangladesh; Bahrain; Belarus; Belgium; Benin; Bolivia (Plurinational State of); Bosnia and Herzegovina; Brazil; Bulgaria; Burkina Faso; Burundi; Cabo Verde; Cameroon; Central African Republic; Chad; Chile; Congo; Cook Islands; Costa Rica; Côte d'Ivoire; Croatia; Cuba; Cyprus; Czech Republic; DR Congo; Denmark; Djibouti; Dominican Republic; Ecuador; Egypt; Equatorial Guinea; Eritrea; Estonia; eSwatini; Ethiopia; European Union; Fiji; Finland; France; Gabon; Gambia (Republic of The); Georgia; Germany; Ghana; Greece; Guinea; Guinea-Bissau; Honduras; Hungary; India; Iran (Islamic Republic of); Iraq; Ireland; Israel; Italy; Jordan; Kazakhstan; Kenya; Kyrgyzstan; Latvia; Lebanon; Liberia; Libya; Liechtenstein; Lithuania; Luxembourg; Madagascar; Malawi; Maldives; Mali; Malta; Mauritania; Mauritius; Monaco; Mongolia; Montenegro; Morocco; Mozambique; Netherlands; New Zealand; Niger; Nigeria; North Macedonia; Norway; Pakistan; Palau; Panama; Paraguay; Peru; Philippines; Poland; Portugal; Republic of Moldova; Romania; Rwanda; Samoa; São Tomé and Príncipe; Saudi Arabia; Senegal; Serbia; Seychelles; Slovakia; Slovenia; Somalia; South Africa; Spain; Sri Lanka; Sweden; Switzerland; Syrian Arab Republic; Tajikistan; Togo; Trinidad and Tobago; Tunisia; Turkmenistan; Uganda; Ukraine; United Arab Emirates; United Kingdom of Great Britain and Northern Ireland; United Republic of Tanzania; Uruguay; Uzbekistan; Yemen; Zimbabwe
- Depositary: Government of Germany
- Languages: English; French; German; Russian; Spanish

Full text
- Convention on the Conservation of Migratory Species of Wild Animals at Wikisource

The Convention on the Conservation of Migratory Species of Wild Animals, also known as the Convention on Migratory Species (CMS) or the Bonn Convention, is an international agreement that aims to conserve migratory species throughout their ranges. The agreement was signed under the auspices of the United Nations Environment Programme and is concerned with conservation of wildlife and habitats on a global scale.

Signed in 1979 in Bonn, West Germany, the convention entered into force in 1983. As of March 2022, there are 132 Member States to the convention. The depositary is the Government of the Federal Republic of Germany.

The CMS is the only global, and United Nations-based, intergovernmental organization established exclusively for the conservation and management of terrestrial, aquatic and avian migratory species. The CMS, and its daughter agreements, determine policy and provide further guidance on specific issues through their strategic plans, action plans, resolutions, decisions and guidelines.

== Fundamental principles ==
Fundamental Principles of the convention are set out in Article 2. The parties acknowledge the importance of migratory species being conserved and of range states agreeing to take action to this end "whenever possible and appropriate", "paying special attention to migratory species the conservation status of which is unfavourable and taking individually or any migratory species becoming endangered".

Article 2(3) of the convention states that

the parties:
(a) Should promote, cooperate in and support research relating to migratory species;
(b) Shall endeavour to provide immediate protection for migratory species included in Appendix I; and
(c) Shall endeavour to conclude AGREEMENTS covering the conservation and management of migratory species included in Appendix II.

== Parties to the convention ==
Map showing the states parties of the CMS: States Parties Signed, but not ratified Participating non-parties

=== States parties ===
The following are all parties to the convention, as of 1 January 2021:

Sovereign states

- Afghanistan
- Albania
- Algeria
- Angola
- Antigua and Barbuda
- Argentina
- Armenia
- Australia
- Austria
- Bangladesh
- Belarus
- Belgium
- Benin
- Bolivia (Plurinational State of)
- Bosnia and Herzegovina
- Brazil
- Bulgaria
- Burkina Faso
- Burundi
- Cabo Verde
- Cameroon
- Central African Republic
- Chad
- Chile
- Congo
- Costa Rica
- Côte d'Ivoire
- Croatia
- Cuba
- Cyprus
- Czech Republic
- DR Congo
- Denmark
- Djibouti
- Dominican Republic
- Ecuador
- Egypt
- Equatorial Guinea
- Eritrea
- Estonia
- Eswatini
- Ethiopia
- Fiji
- Finland
- France
- Gabon
- Gambia (Republic of The)
- Georgia
- Germany
- Ghana
- Greece
- Guinea
- Guinea-Bissau
- Honduras
- Hungary
- India
- Iran (Islamic Republic of)
- Iraq
- Ireland
- Israel
- Italy
- Jordan
- Kazakhstan
- Kenya
- Kyrgyzstan
- Latvia
- Lebanon
- Liberia
- Libya
- Liechtenstein
- Lithuania
- Luxembourg
- Madagascar
- Malawi
- Maldives
- Mali
- Malta
- Mauritania
- Mauritius
- Monaco
- Mongolia
- Montenegro
- Morocco
- Mozambique
- Netherlands
- New Zealand
- Niger
- Nigeria
- North Macedonia
- Norway
- Pakistan
- Palau
- Panama
- Paraguay
- Peru
- Philippines
- Poland
- Portugal
- Republic of Moldova
- Romania
- Rwanda
- Samoa
- São Tomé and Príncipe
- Saudi Arabia
- Senegal
- Serbia
- Seychelles
- Slovakia
- Slovenia
- Somalia
- South Africa
- Spain
- Sri Lanka
- Sweden
- Switzerland
- Syrian Arab Republic
- Tajikistan
- Togo
- Trinidad and Tobago
- Tunisia
- Uganda
- Ukraine
- United Arab Emirates
- United Kingdom of Great Britain and Northern Ireland
- United Republic of Tanzania
- Uruguay
- Uzbekistan
- Yemen
- Zimbabwe

Other states/entities

- Cook Islands
- European Union

Signed, but not ratified

- Jamaica

=== Participating non-parties ===
The following, while not parties to the convention, are party to one or more of the agreements and/or have signed one or more of the MOUs:

Sovereign states

- Azerbaijan
- Botswana
- China
- Colombia
- Comoros
- Iceland
- Indonesia
- Malaysia
- Micronesia (Federated States of)
- Myanmar
- Namibia
- Nauru
- Nepal
- Oman
- Papua New Guinea
- Russian Federation
- San Marino
- Sierra Leone
- Solomon Islands
- Sudan
- Thailand
- Tonga
- Turkey
- Tuvalu
- United States of America
- Vanuatu
- Viet Nam

Other states/entities

- Niue

== Species coverage ==
The CMS Family covers a great diversity of migratory species. The appendices of CMS include many mammals, including land mammals, marine mammals and bats; birds; fish; reptiles and one insect. Among the instruments, AEWA covers 254 species of birds that are ecologically dependent on wetlands for at least part of their annual cycle. EUROBATS covers 52 species of bat, the Memorandum of Understanding on the Conservation of Migratory Sharks seven species of shark, the IOSEA Marine Turtle MOU six species of marine turtle and the Raptors MoU 76 species of birds of prey.

=== Appendix I – Threatened migratory species ===
Migratory species threatened with extinction are listed on Appendix I of the convention, with relevant provisions outlined in Article III, paragraphs 4 and 5. Parties that are range states to Appendix I species are obliged to afford them strict protection. CMS parties strive towards strictly protecting these animals, conserving or restoring the places where they live, mitigating obstacles to migration and controlling other factors that might endanger them. Besides establishing obligations for each state joining the convention, CMS promotes concerted action among the range states of many of these species.

=== Appendix II – Migratory species requiring international cooperation ===
Migratory species that need or would significantly benefit from international co-operation are listed in Appendix II of the convention. These species, either individually or by taxonomic group, are the basis for establishing instruments – regional or global – under CMS. For this reason, the convention encourages the range states to conclude global or regional agreements.

== CMS instruments ==
=== Agreements ===
The CMS acts as a framework convention and encourages its states parties to conclude global or regional agreements. Article V of the convention lays out what agreements agreed to under its auspices should include. These agreements are usually legally binding treaties that aim to "restore the migratory species concerned to a favorable conservation status or to maintain it in such a status." To date seven agreements have been signed, they are as follow:

- Agreement on the Conservation of Albatrosses and Petrels (ACAP)
- Agreement on the Conservation of Cetaceans of the Black Sea, Mediterranean Sea and Contiguous Atlantic Area (ACCOBAMS)
- Agreement on the Conservation of African-Eurasian Migratory Waterbirds (AEWA)
- Agreement on the Conservation of Small Cetaceans of the Baltic, North East Atlantic, Irish and North Seas (ASCOBANS)
- Agreement on the Conservation of Populations of European Bats (EUROBATS)
- Agreement on the Conservation of Gorillas and their Habitats (Gorilla Agreement)
- Agreement on the Conservation of Seals in the Wadden Sea (Wadden Sea Seals)

=== Memoranda of understanding (MOU) ===
In addition, several memoranda of understanding (MOU) have also been concluded under the auspices of CMS. While not full agreements, these MOU still aim to conserve various migratory species. To date, 19 MOU have been signed. They are as follows:

- Memorandum of Understanding concerning Conservation Measures for the Aquatic Warbler
- Memorandum of Understanding concerning Conservation Measures for Marine Turtles of the Atlantic Coast of Africa
- Memorandum of Understanding on the Conservation of Migratory Birds of Prey in Africa and Eurasia
- Memorandum of Understanding concerning Conservation and Restoration of the Bukhara Deer
- Memorandum of Understanding on the Conservation and Management of Dugongs and their Habitats throughout their Range
- Memorandum of Understanding on the Conservation of High Andean Flamingos and their Habitats
- Memorandum of Understanding on the Conservation and Management of Marine Turtles and their Habitats of the Indian Ocean and South-East Asia
- Memorandum of Understanding on the Conservation and Management of the Middle-European Population of the Great Bustard
- Memorandum of Understanding concerning Conservation Measures for the Eastern Atlantic Populations of the Mediterranean Monk Seal
- Memorandum of Understanding for the Conservation of Cetaceans and their Habitats in the Pacific Islands Region
- Memorandum of Understanding between the Republic of Argentine and the Republic of Chile on the Conservation of the Ruddy-headed Goose
- Memorandum of Understanding concerning Conservation, Restoration and Sustainable Use of the Saiga Antelope
- Memorandum of Understanding on the Conservation of Migratory Sharks
- Memorandum of Understanding concerning Conservation Measures for the Siberian Crane
- Memorandum of Understanding concerning Conservation Measures for the Slender-billed Curlew
- Memorandum of Understanding between the Argentine Republic and the Republic of Chile on the Conservation of the Southern Huemul
- Memorandum of Understanding on the Conservation of Southern South American Migratory Grassland Bird Species and their Habitats
- Memorandum of Understanding concerning Conservation Measures for the West African Populations of the African Elephant
- Memorandum of Understanding concerning the Conservation of the Manatee and Small Cetaceans of Western Africa and Macaronesia

== Organizational structure ==
=== Conference of the Parties (COP) ===
The Conference of the Parties of the CMS acts as its principal decision-making body. It is composed of all states parties to the convention, as well as any observers that wish to participate in the proceedings of the conference. COPs are held at least every three years.

The functions of the COP are enumerated in Article VII of the convention. At conferences, the states parties review the implementation of this convention, as well as approve all financial regulations of the convention.

List of Conference of Parties of the CMS
Conference	Year	Dates	Location
COP 1	1985	21–26 October	Bonn, West Germany
COP 2	1988	13–14 October	Geneva, Switzerland
COP 3	1991	9–13 September	Geneva, Switzerland
COP 4	1994	7–11 June	Nairobi, Kenya
COP 5	1997	10–16 April	Geneva, Switzerland
COP 6	1999	10–16 November	Cape Town, South Africa
COP 7	2002	18–24 September	Bonn, Germany
COP 8	2005	20–25 November	Nairobi, Kenya
COP 9	2008	1–5 December	Rome, Italy
COP 10	2011	20–25 November	Bergen, Norway
COP 11	2014	4–9 November	Quito, Ecuador
COP 12	2017	23–28 October	Manila, Philippines
COP 13	2020	15–22 February	Gandhinagar, India
COP 14	2024	12–27 February	Samarkand, Uzbekistan
COP 15	2026	23 - 29 March	Campo Grande, Brazil

=== Standing committee (StC) ===
The Standing Committee is responsible for carrying out interim activities on behalf of the Conference of the Parties in between its meetings. The Committee meets at least once a year. It also usually meets immediately before and after any COPs.

The functions of the Standing Committee were established by Resolution 1.1 of COP 1 in 1985. However, in 2008 at COP 9, the makeup of the Standing Committee was overhauled. Under Resolution 9.15 the composition of the committee, as well as its functions we updated. Its updated functions include:

- To ensure that decisions of the COP are implemented
- To monitor the budget
- To make recommendations for consideration by the next COP
- To provide advice and guidance to the secretariat
- To represent the COP in negotiations with the Host Government and UNEP with regard to the secretariat
- To act as a bureau at the COP
- To undertake any other ad hoc task assigned to it by the COP.

The committee is composed of 15 members who are elected to serve three-year terms, or from the end of one COP until the end of the next. Alternate members are also selected. Under Resolution 9.15, the composition is as follows:

- Three members from each of the geographic regions of Africa and Europe,
- Two members from each of the geographic regions of Asia and South and Central America and the Caribbean,
- One member from each of the geographic regions of North America and Oceania;
- The Depositary, and Host Government of the secretariat
- The Host Government of the next and previous meetings of the COP

List of Members of the Standing Committee
Region / Member	Members	Alternate Members
Africa	Algeria	Seychelles
Africa	Kenya	Uganda
Africa	Mali	Zimbabwe
Asia	Saudi Arabia	Bangladesh
Asia	Uzbekistan	Pakistan
South and Central America and the Caribbean	Panama	Costa Rica
South and Central America and the Caribbean	Uruguay	Peru
Europe	Italy	France
Europe	Croatia	Switzerland
Europe	Georgia	Monaco
North America	Vacant	
Oceania	New Zealand	Palau
Depositary	Germany	
Host of COP 13	India	
Host of COP 14	Vacant (Note: The host of COP 14 was Uzbekistan, which is already a member of the Standing Committee.)	

=== Scientific Council (ScC) ===
The main objective of the Scientific Council is to provide advice on scientific matters to CMS bodies, as well as CMS states parties. The council makes recommendations to the COP issues such as research on migratory species, specific conservation and management measures, the inclusion of migratory species in the Appendices and designation of species for Concerted or Cooperative Actions under the convention.

The functions of the Scientific Council are enumerated in Article VIII of the convention. However, it was not established until 1985 under Resolution 1.4 of COP 1. Each state party is entitled to appoint one qualified expert as a member of the Scientific Council, as well as one alternate scientific councillor. Additionally, the COP may also appoint to the council other experts to cover fields of particular interest to the convention.

==== Sessional Committee ====
In 2014, at COP 11, a new sub-body of the Scientific Council was created via Resolution 11.4. This representative selection of the membership of the Scientific Council is called the Sessional Committee. It is composed of nine COP-appointed councillors, as well as fifteen party-appointed councillors (three from Africa; three from Asia; three from Europe; three from Oceania; three from South and Central America and the Caribbean).

The Sessional Committee works during the intersessional period between two consecutive meetings of the COP, and is responsible for the implementation of the mandate assigned to the Scientific Council by the COP. All work done by the Sessional Committee is considered work of the Scientific Council.

=== Secretariat ===
THE CMS secretariat acts as the convention's coordinating body. The CMS Secretariat is provided and administered by the United Nations Environment Programme.

The functions of the secretariat are laid out in Article IX of the convention. They include: arranging for and servicing meetings of the COP, Scientific Council and Standing Committee, maintaining liaison between the states parties, disseminating information that furthers the objectives and implementation CMS, preparing COP reports, promote the conclusion of CMS Agreements, among other functions.

The secretariat has been based in Bonn, Germany, since its creation, but was relocated to the United Nations Campus in Bonn in 1998. Additionally, since 2009, the secretariat also maintains an out-post office in Abu Dhabi, United Arab Emirates. The Abu Dhabi office oversees implementation of the MOU on the Conservation of Migratory Birds of Prey in Africa and Eurasia, and the MOU on the Conservation and Management of Dugongs and their Habitats throughout their range. The office is hosted by the Environment Agency – Abu Dhabi.

The current executive secretary of the convention is Andy Raine.

== Implementation ==
=== Reporting ===
Article 6(3) requires parties which are range states for migratory species listed in Appendix I or II to inform the CoP through the secretariat, at least six months prior to each ordinary meeting of the conference, on measures that they are taking to implement the convention for these species.

=== Domestic legislation ===
To varying degrees the Bonn Convention has been incorporated into domestic law by the parties.

== See also ==
- Animal migration
- Highly migratory species
- Memorandum of Understanding on the Conservation of Migratory Birds of Prey in Africa and Eurasia (Raptors MoU)
- Memorandum of Understanding concerning Conservation Measures for the West African Populations of the African Elephant
- Memorandum of Understanding concerning Conservation Measures for the Aquatic Warbler
- Memorandum of Understanding concerning Conservation and Restoration of the Bukhara Deer
- Memorandum of Understanding for the Conservation of Cetaceans and Their Habitats in the Pacific Island Region
- Memorandum of Understanding on the Conservation and Management of Middle-European Populations of the Great Bustard
- Memorandum of Understanding on the Conservation of High Andean Flamingos and their Habitats
- Memorandum of Understanding concerning Conservation Measures for Marine Turtles of the Atlantic Coast of Africa
- Memorandum of Understanding concerning Conservation Measures for the Eastern Atlantic Populations of the Mediterranean Monk Seal
- Memorandum of Understanding concerning Conservation Measures for the Ruddy-headed Goose
- Memorandum of Understanding Concerning Conservation, Restoration and Sustainable Use of the Saiga Antelope
- Memorandum of Understanding on the Conservation of Southern South American Migratory Grassland Bird Species and Their Habitats
- Memorandum of Understanding Concerning Conservation Measures for the Siberian Crane
- Memorandum of Understanding on the Conservation of the South Andean Huemul
- Memorandum of Understanding Concerning the Conservation of the Manatee and mall Cetaceans of Western Africa and Macaronesia
- Convention on Biological Diversity
- Convention on the International Trade in Endangered Species of Wild Flora and Fauna (CITES)
- List of international environmental agreements
- Ramsar Convention
- Japan–Australia Migratory Bird Agreement
