= Great Bustard Memorandum of Understanding =

Memorandum of Understanding on the Conservation and Management of Middle-European Populations of the Great Bustard
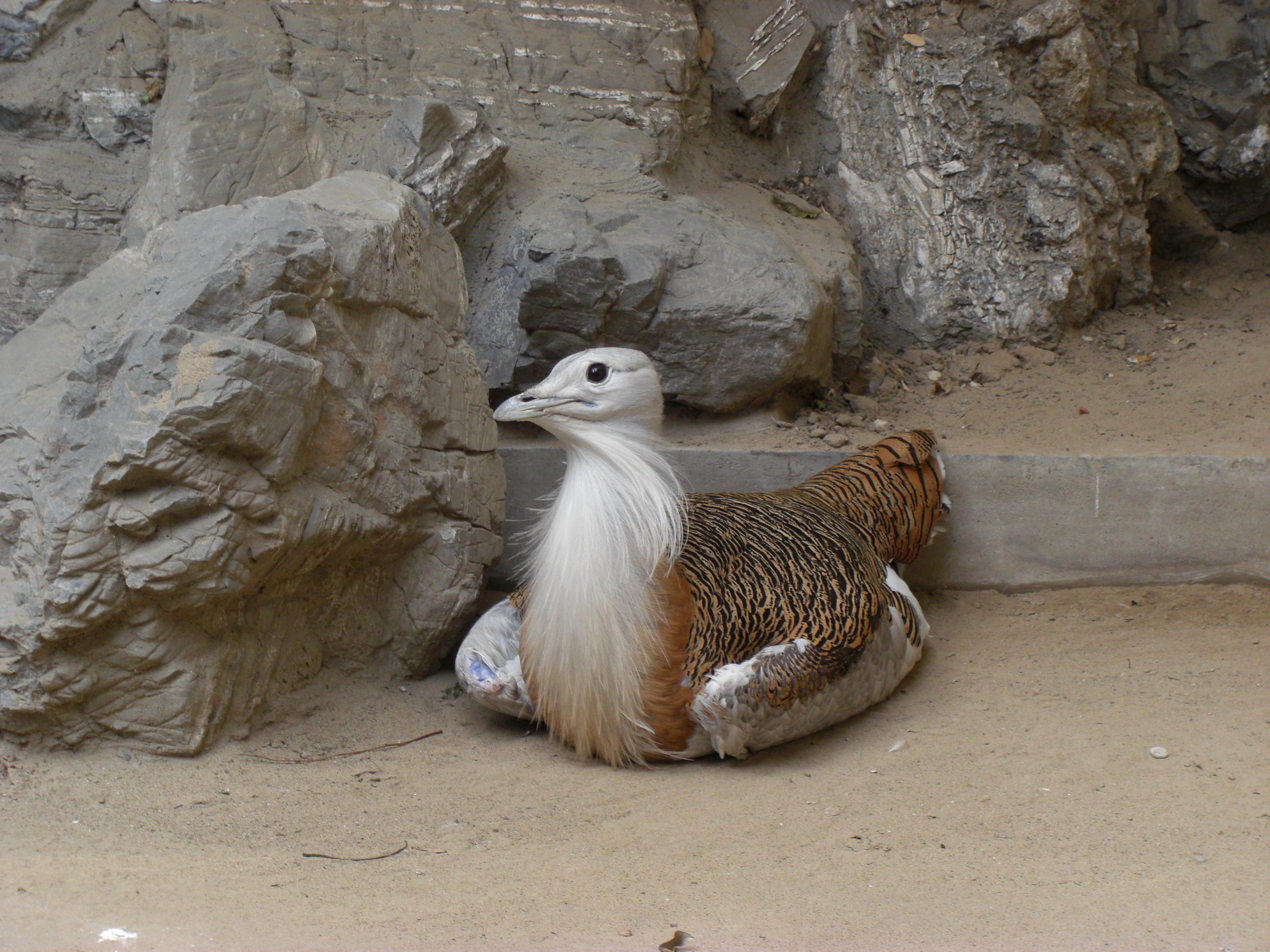
- Context: nature conservation
- Effective: 1 June 2001
- Signatories: Romania; Hungary; Macedonia; Moldova; Bulgaria; Greece; Austria; Slovakia; Ukraine; Albania; Croatia; Germany; Czech Republic
- Languages: English

The Memorandum of Understanding (MoU) on the Conservation and Management of Middle-European Populations of the Great Bustard is a multilateral environmental memorandum of understanding and was concluded in 2000 under the auspices of the Convention on Migratory Species of Wild Animals (CMS), also known as the Bonn Convention, and came into effect on 1 June 2001. It aims to protect the Middle-European populations of the great bustard and to manage modern agriculture throughout its range in Central Europe in order to save the remaining individuals. The MoU covers 17 range states (Albania, Austria, Bosnia & Herzegovina, Bulgaria, Croatia, Czech Republic, European Union, Germany, Greece, Hungary, Moldova, Poland, Romania, Slovakia, Slovenia, The Republic of Macedonia and Ukraine). As of August 2012, 13 range states have signed the MoU as well as a number of cooperating organizations.

== Development of MoU ==
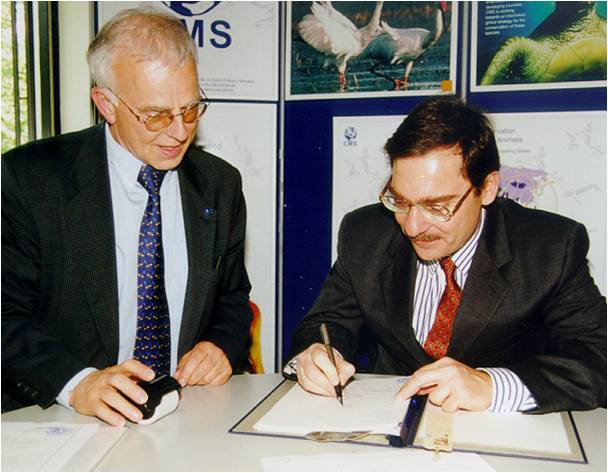
Signing of the Great Bustard MoU by Greece, 22 May 2001

To implement the decision of the Fourth Conference of the Parties of CMS to list the great bustard (Otis tarda) on Appendix II of the Convention as a consequence of its unfavourable conservation status and the conviction that the species could benefit from an international agreement for its conservation and management and the middle-European population on Appendix I of the Convention taking into consideration the threatened status, an Article IV agreement was concluded in 2000 and entered into effect on 1 June 2001 after signature by the fifth range state. As of August 2012, the MoU has 13 signatories.

Signatories to the Great Bustard MoU:

- Romania (9 September 2000)
- Hungary (7 October 2000)
- The Republic of Macedonia (7 October 2000)
- Moldova (19 December 2000)
- Bulgaria (16 May 2001)
- Greece (22 May 2001)
- Austria (28 November 2001)
- Slovakia (28 November 2001)
- Ukraine (17 April 2002)
- Albania (18 April 2002)
- Croatia (4 June 2002)
- Germany (18 September 2002)
- Czech Republic (18 February 2008)

In addition, four organizations have signed the MoU as collaborators:

- BirdLife International (7 October 2000)
- International Council for Game and Wildlife Conservation (CIC) (10 October 2000)
- IUCN (7 October 2000)
- UNEP/CMS Secretariat (5 October 2000)

== Aim of MoU ==
Concerned by the fact that great bustard populations in Central and Eastern Europe were, with approximately 2,000 individuals at the time the MoU was concluded, in serious decline and had reached a very vulnerable level to the brink of extinction, the MoU provides a framework for governments, scientists, conservation bodies and others to monitor and coordinate conservation efforts. These efforts need to focus on active habitat management and on maintaining large areas of non-intensive farming systems.

== Species covered by MoU ==
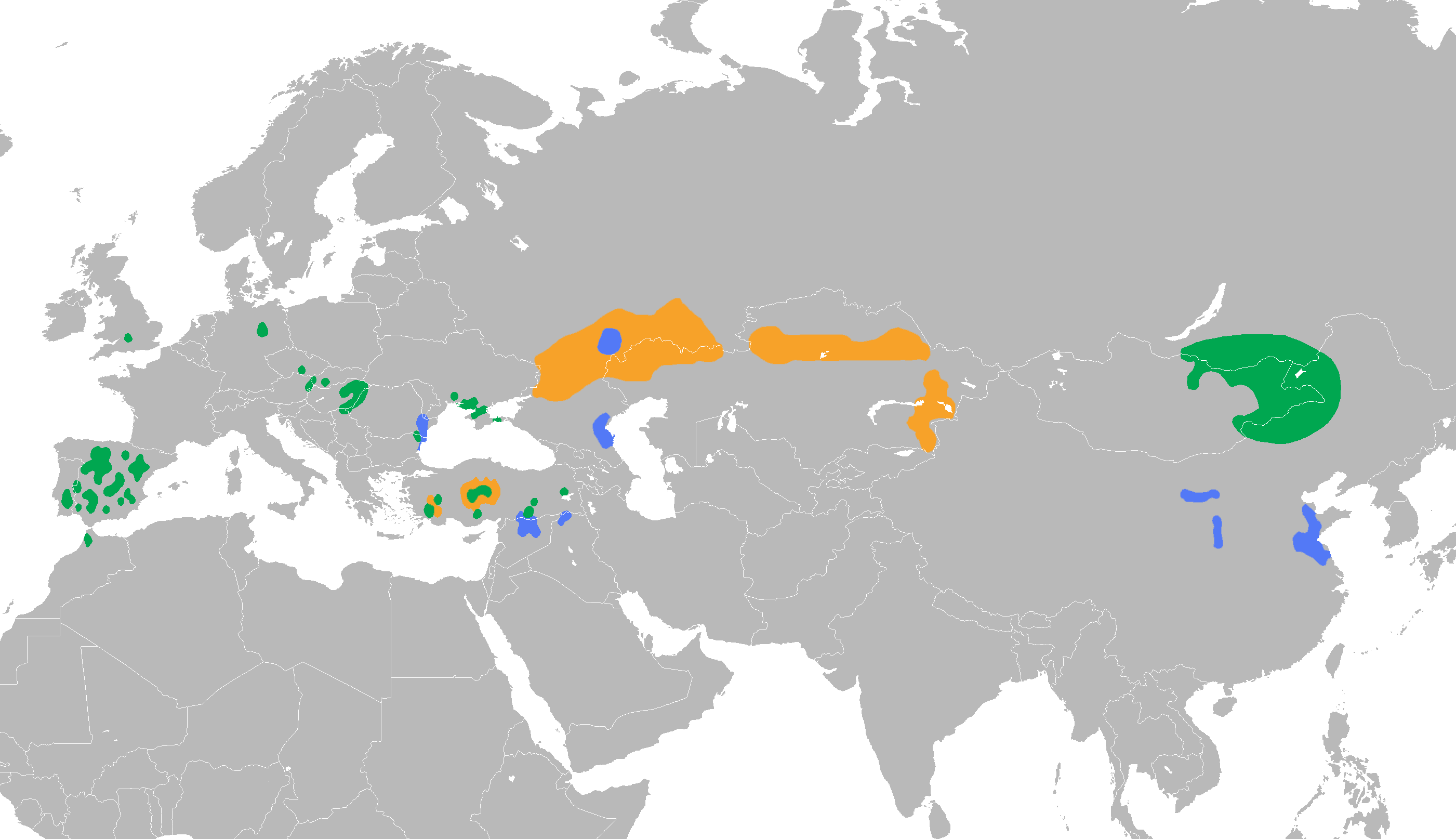
Great bustard (Otis tarda) distribution map

The MoU only covers the middle-European populations of the great bustard (Otis tarda). Several remnant great bustard populations that can be found in, inter alia, Spain, Portugal, Morocco, Russia, Turkey, Kazakhstan, China and Mongolia are not included.

== Fundamental components ==
All signatories shall endeavour to work closely together and with appropriate international organizations to improve the conservation status of the great bustard throughout its breeding, migratory and wintering range. Therefore, they shall:

1. Conserve the great bustard population and, where feasible and appropriate, restore important habitat
2. Prohibit the taking of middle-European population with some exceptions e.g. scientific purposes
3. Endeavour to provide maximum protection to, and where feasible, the habitat of the great bustard at its remaining breeding sites including all those areas where the females rear their young
4. Identify and monitor processes and categories of activities that are endangering or are likely further to endanger the species and take appropriate steps to regulate and manage these with a view to improving the conservation status
5. Endeavour to map the recently abandoned breeding habitat and implement in such areas suitable habitat management measures and agricultural practices with a view to encouraging the return of great bustard populations to those areas in the near future
6. Endeavour to identify and conserve potential unoccupied breeding habitats
7. Endeavour to take appropriate measures to protect single individuals or small groups appearing on migration or on wintering sites in grasslands or agricultural areas
8. Implement the provisions of the Action Plan, annexed to the MoU

The MoU was concluded for a period of five years starting from the date of its entry into effect (June 2001). It was automatically renewed for a period of three years and thereafter every three years for a further period of three years, unless the majority of the signatories decide otherwise.

== Meetings ==
Meetings of signatories – range states that signed the MoU – shall be convened by the Secretariat upon request of at least half of the states which are signatories, subject to the availability of funds. During these meetings the conservation status of the great bustard and the implementation of the Action Plan will be reviewed. Also the national reports submitted by individual signatories, the report prepared by the Secretariat and any recommendation or scientific advice that may have been made by the Conference of the Parties or the Scientific Council of the CMS will be considered. Finally, the meeting can recommend the signatories to take action that it thinks fit.

The First Meeting of Signatories took place in Illmitz, Austria, 17 and 18 September 2004. During this meeting the following points were addressed:

- Share information on (i) the great bustard's conservation status within the respective range states, (ii) the status of development and implementation of the National Work Programmes, (iii) the status of implementation of the MoU and the Action Plan and (iv) the status of signatures to the MoU
- Develop a list of designated national contact points
- Consider a draft Medium-term International Work Programme

The signatories represented at the meeting were Austria, Bulgaria, Croatia, Macedonia, Hungary, Germany, Moldova, Romania, Slovakia and Ukraine. Greece and Albania, also signatories to the MoU were not represented. The first meeting endorsed the Russian Federation to join the MoU, but Russian representatives weren't able to come because of the ongoing complicated process of the reorganization of their federal bodies. A number of organizations such as BirdLife International, IUCN and WWF Austria were also present during the meeting.

The Second Meeting of Signatories was held in Feodosia, Ukraine, 11 and 12 November 2008. The signatories represented at the meeting were Austria, Bulgaria, Czech Republic, Germany, Hungary, Macedonia and Ukraine. Albania, Croatia, Romania, Moldova, Greece and Slovakia, also signatories to the MoU were not represented. Additionally, a representative from the Russian Federation attended the meeting as observer. Finally, a number of organizations such as BirdLife International, Ukrainian Society for the Protection of Birds and the Russian Bird Conservation Union were present during the meeting.

The Third Meeting of Signatories was scheduled to take place in April 2013. Hungary offered to host this meeting.

== Secretariat ==
The CMS Secretariat - located in Bonn, Germany - acts as the secretariat to the MoU. The main tasks of this body are the following:

- Convene the meeting of the signatories and report the outcome of the meeting to the Conference of the Parties of the CMS;
- Prepare an overview report compiled on the basis of all information at its disposal pertaining to the great bustard and communicate this information to all signatories, other range states and signing organizations;
- Be the depositary of the MoU.

== Action Plan ==
The Action Plan is annexed to the MoU and is an integral part thereof. It consists out of two parts. Part one contains general provision regarding:

- Habitat protection
- Prevention of hunting, disturbance and other threats
- Possession and trade
- Recovery measures
- Cross-border conservation measures
- Monitoring and research
- Training of staff working in conservation bodies
- Increasing awareness of the need to protect great bustards and their habitat
- Economic measures

Part two lists specific activities appropriate for each range state.

== Financial support ==
Several grants from the European Union LIFE programme have helped fund great bustard protection efforts in central Europe. Programmes are in place to protect breeding areas, provide feeding areas, provide feeding areas for wintering birds and minimize collisions between the birds and power lines. In several EU states, agri-environmental schemes financed by the European Agricultural and Rural Development Fund encourage farmers to maintain or adopt appropriate measures.

== Activities and successes ==
Until recently there had been plans for the construction of a wind farm within and around a Special protection Area (SPA) and Natura 2000 site in the Salonta region, Bihor County, Romania, which provides important wintering habitat for the great bustard. At the Second Meeting of Signatories it was acknowledged that the population trends were improving in Germany, Austria and Hungary. However, there was a concern that the population trends might be negative in Slovakia, Bulgaria, Ukraine, the Russian Federation and Romania. Therefore, the planned wind farm could have negative effects on the great bustard populations in Romania and Hungary as well since the Salonta region is near the Hungarian-Romanian border. In July 2012 the CMS Secretariat has received good news regarding this project. The Romanian Ministry of Environment and Forests confirmed its commitment to relocate the wind farm to an alternative location, thereby limiting conflict with the great bustard populations in the region.
