= Sharga, Govi-Altai =

District in Govi-Altai Province, Mongolia

Coordinates: 46°16′07″N 95°16′21″E

Sharga District Шарга сум ᠰᠢᠷᠭ᠎ᠠᠰᠤᠮᠤ
- District
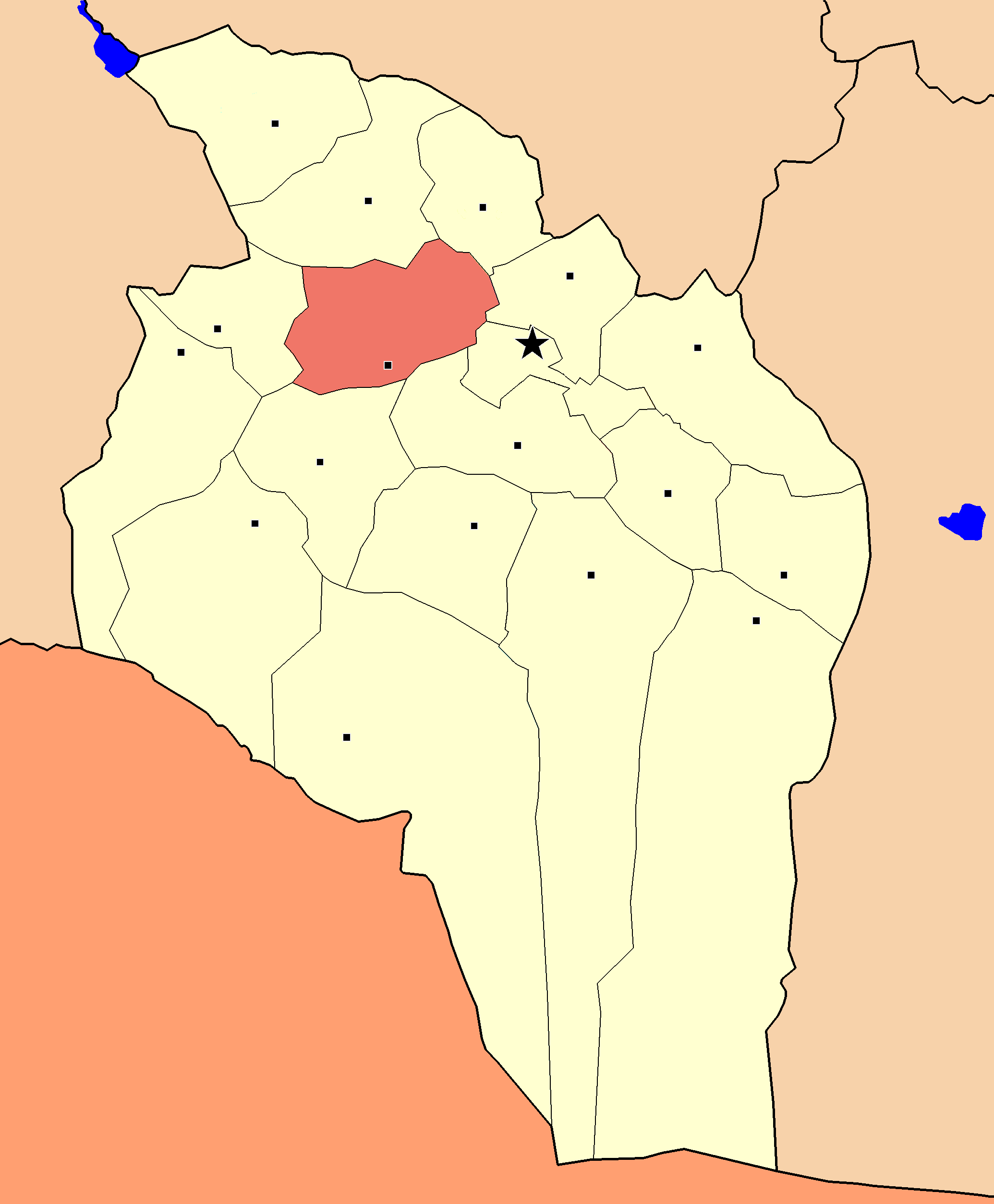
- Sharga District in Govi-Altai Province
- Country: Mongolia
- Province: Govi-Altai Province

Area
  - Total: 5,566 km^{2} (2,149 sq mi)
- Time zone: UTC+8 (UTC + 8)

Sharga (Mongolian: Шарга) is a sum (district) of Govi-Altai Province in western Mongolia. The area has one of the last two populations of the Mongolian saiga antelope (Saiga tatarica mongolica), which is protected in Sharga Nature Reserve. In 2009, its population was 1,921.

The ruins of Chinqai Balgasun have been discovered in this area.

== Administrative divisions ==
The district is divided into four bags, which are:

- Bayangol
- Khamtiin khuch
- Sonduult
- Ulaan tug
