= Stepnoi Nature Sanctuary =

Protected area located in Liman district of Astrakhan Oblast, Russia

Stepnoi State Nature Sanctuary
- Russian: государственный природный заказник "Степной"
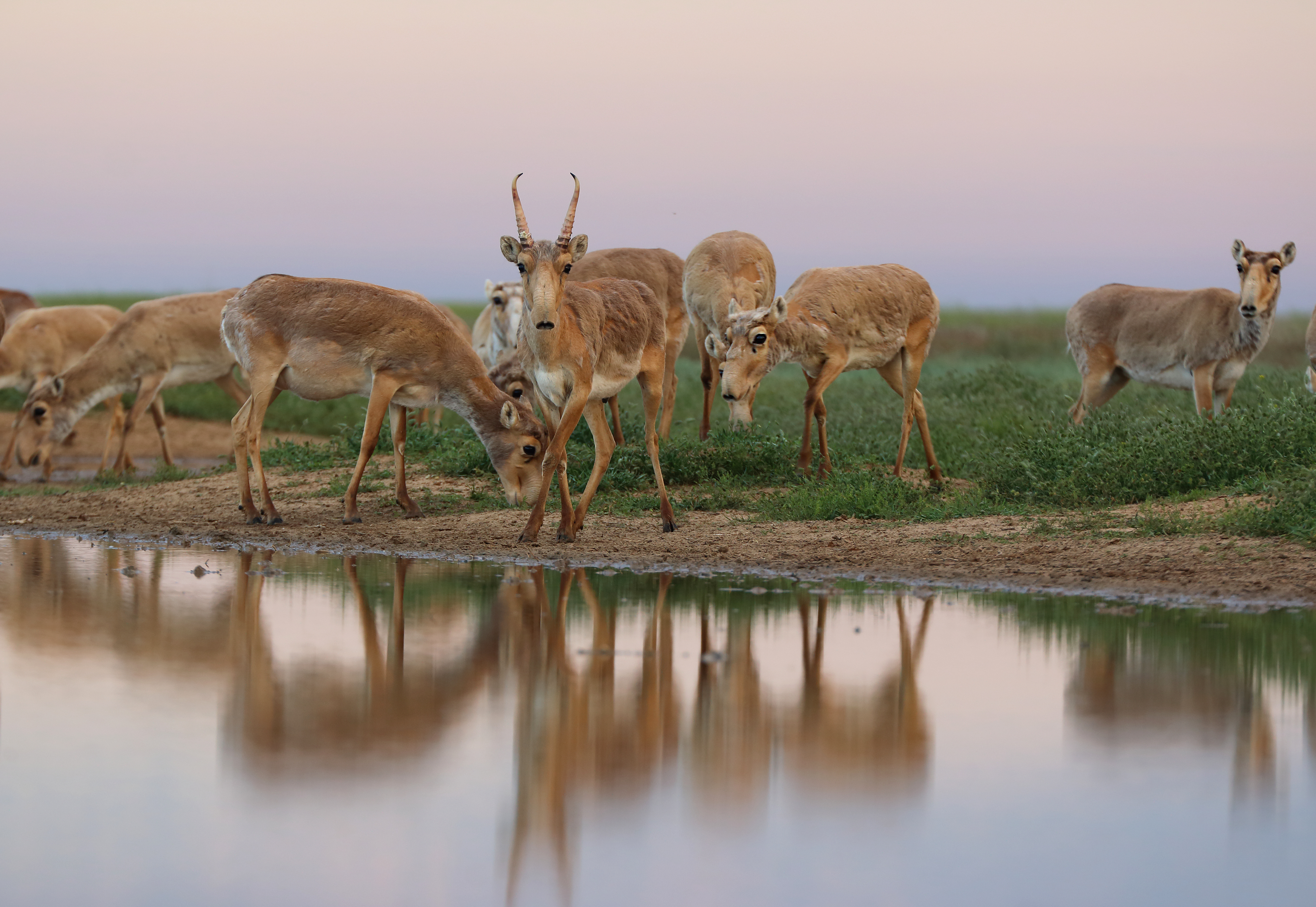

- Location within Russia
- Location: Astrakhan Oblast
- Nearest city: Astrakhan
- Coordinates: 45°55′N 46°46′E
- Website: Official Reserve Webpage, in Russian

Stepnoi State Nature Sanctuary (Russian: государственный природный заказник "Степной") (also Stepnoy Nature Reserve) is a protected area located in Liman district of Astrakhan Oblast, Russia.

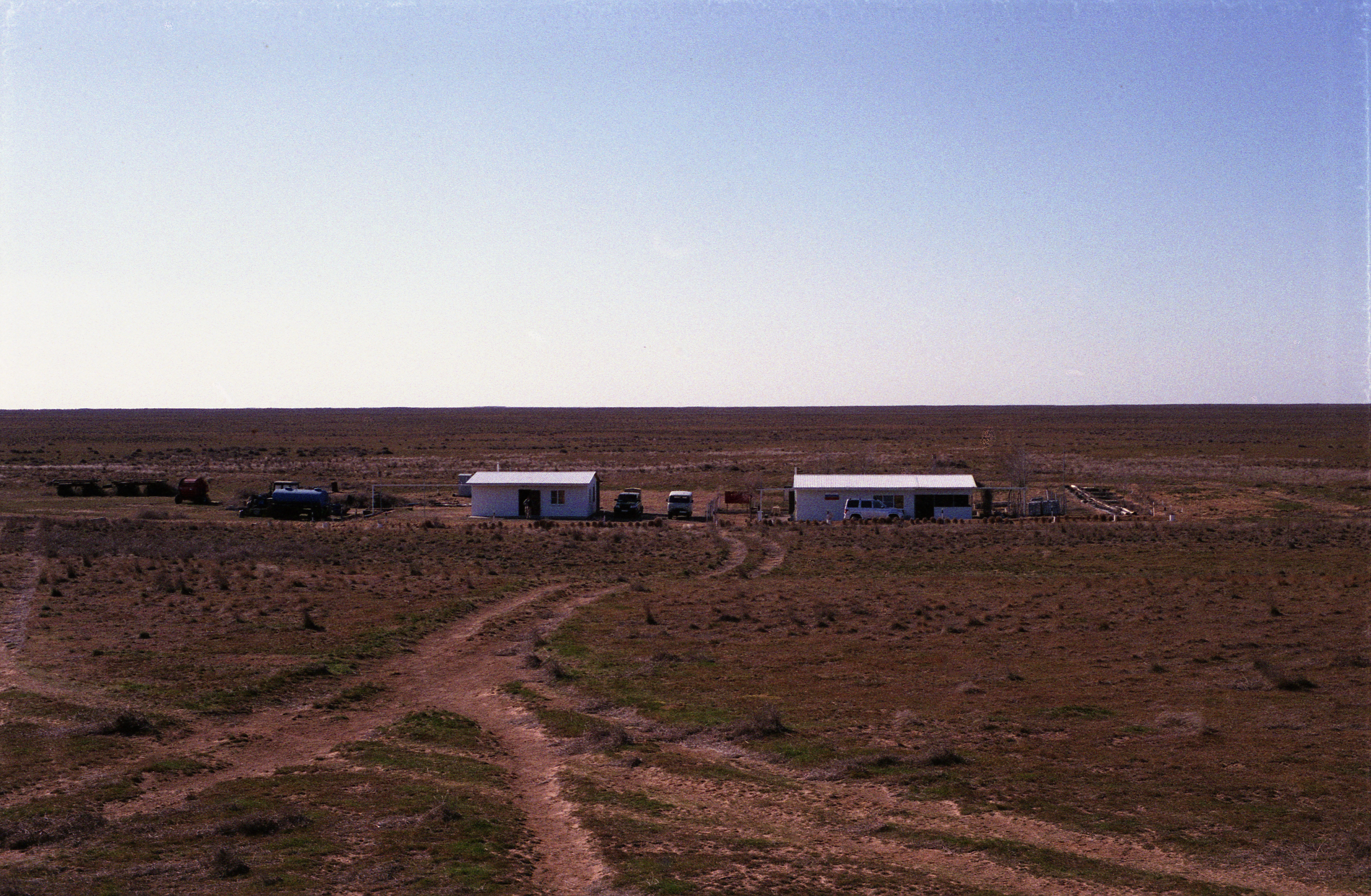
Rangers station in Stepnoi Sanctuary (2020)

The sanctuary was declared in 2000 to ensure maintenance of unique natural complex of Stipa steppe providing habitat for saiga antelope (Saiga tatarica tatarica) and a number of other endangered species of animals and plants. The sanctuary covers an area of 109.4 thousands of hectares. The monitoring program started in 2004 showed that the sanctuary is an important territory for the survival of the critically endangered saiga antelope. Saigas inhabit the sanctuary and the nearby regions of Kalmykia throughout the year. Stepnoi sanctuary provides well-protected territory for both rut and calving of saigas. Several artesian wells within the sanctuary serve as waterholes and mineral licks for saiga.

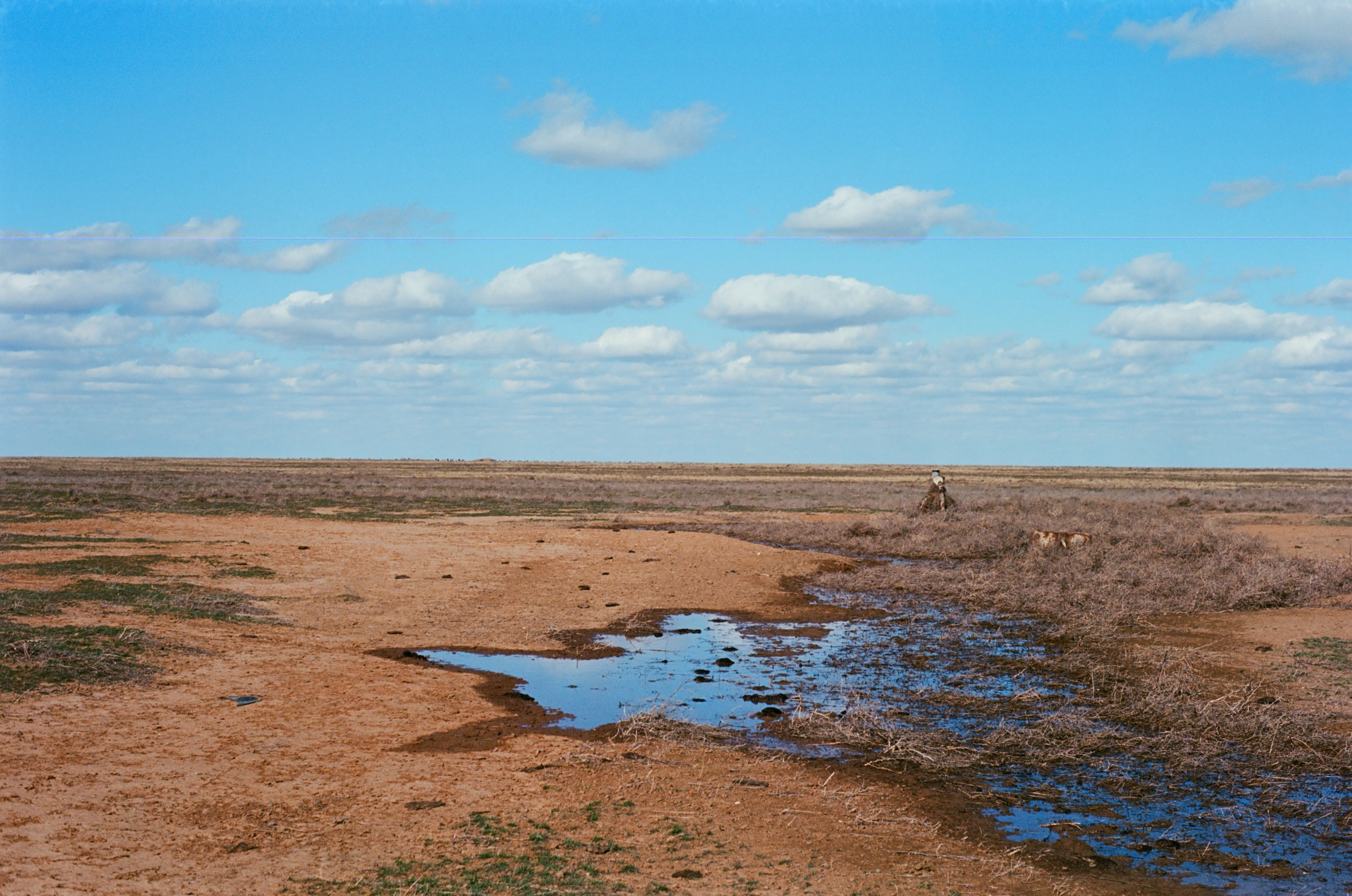
Artesian well in steppe

The role of these wells lacking human disturbance becomes especially important during the calving period when pregnant females and females with newborn calves are not able to move long distances. These waterholes are regularly visited by saiga antelopes from spring to late autumn. Stepnoi sanctuary also provides important habitat for many endangered and locally rare bird species such as steppe eagle (Aquila nipalensis), eastern imperial eagle (Aquila heliaca), demoiselle crane (Grus virgo), black-winged pratincole (Glareola nordmanni), little bustard (Tetrax tetrax), etc _{.}

== See also ==
- Saiga Conservation Alliance
- Saiga Resource Centre
