= Saiga Antelope Memorandum of Understanding =

2006 wild animal conservation agreement

Memorandum of Understanding Concerning Conservation, Restoration and Sustainable Use of the Saiga Antelope
- Context: nature conservation
- Effective: 24 September 2006
- Signatories: Turkmenistan; Uzbekistan; Kazakhstan; Russian Federation; Mongolia
- Languages: English and Russian

The Memorandum of Understanding (MoU) Concerning Conservation, Restoration and Sustainable Use of the Saiga Antelope is a Multilateral Environmental Memorandum of Understanding and came into effect on 24 September 2006 under the auspices of the Convention on Migratory Species of Wild Animals (CMS), also known as the Bonn Convention. The MoU covers five range States (Kazakhstan, Mongolia, Russian Federation, Turkmenistan and Uzbekistan), all of which have signed. A number of cooperating organizations have also signed the MoU.

== Development of MoU ==
To implement the decision of the Seventh Conference of the Parties of CMS to list the Saiga Antelope (Saiga tatarica) on Appendix II of the Convention as a consequence of its endangered status and the conviction that conservation efforts of this species are dependent on international collaboration between the range States, an Article IV agreement was concluded and took effect on 24 September 2006 after signature by the third range State.

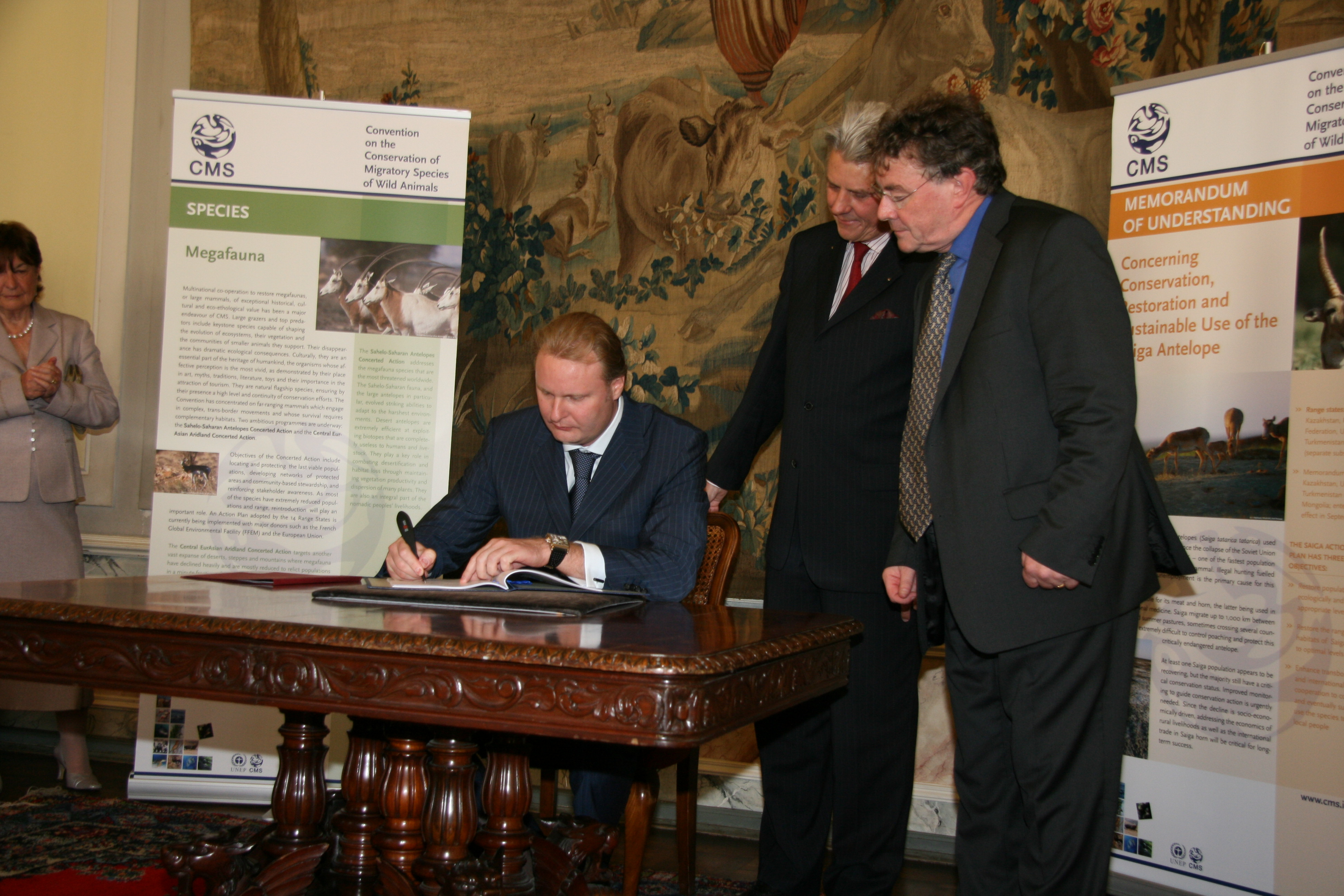
Signing of the Saiga Antelope MoU by the Russian Federation, 24 June 2009

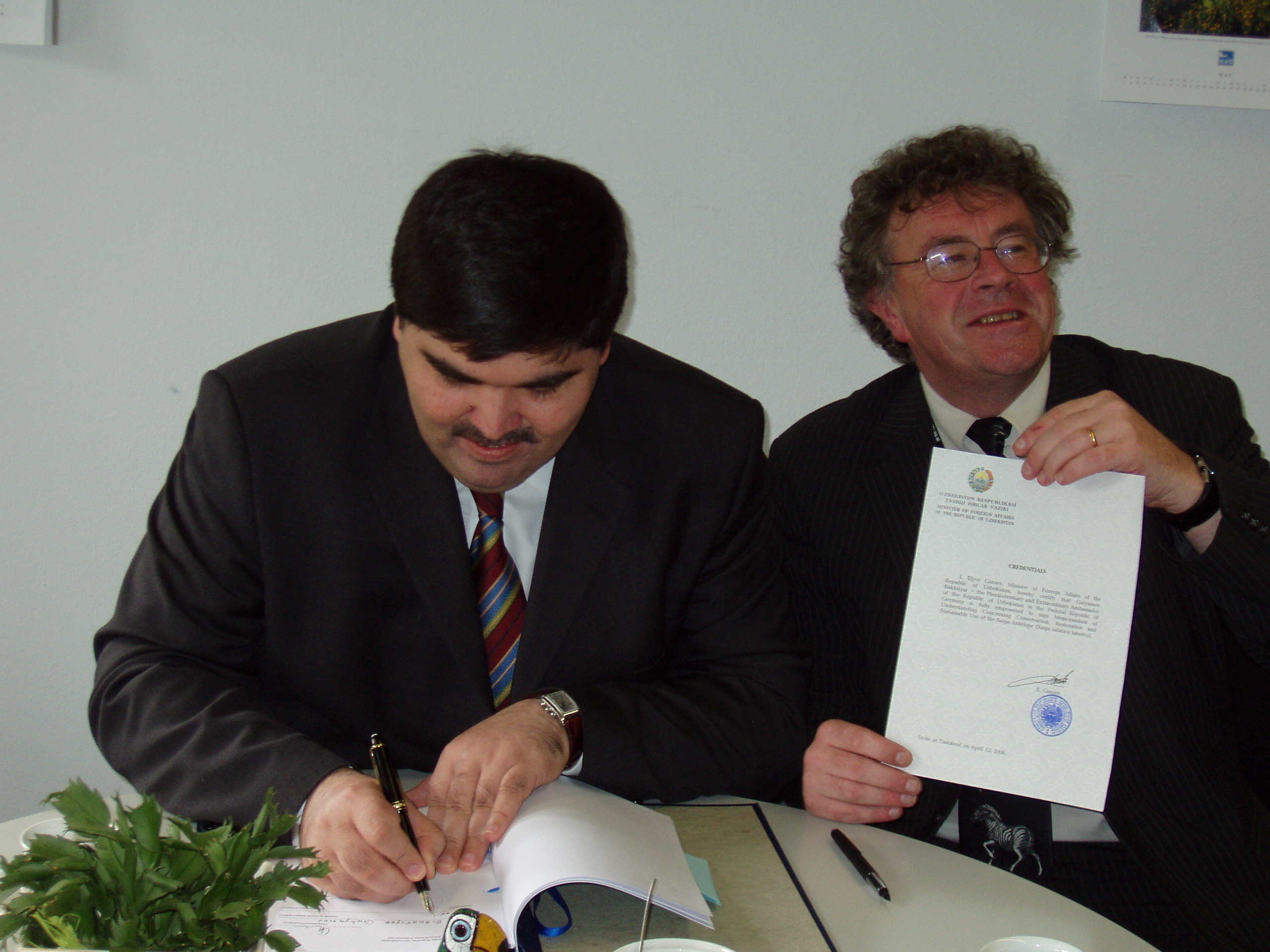
Signing of the Saiga Antelope MoU by Uzbekistan, 23 May 2006

Signatories to the Saiga Antelope MoU:

- Turkmenistan (23 November 2005)
- Uzbekistan (23 May 2006)
- Kazakhstan (24 September 2006)
- Russian Federation (24 June 2009)
- Mongolia (10 September 2010)

In addition, the following organizations have signed the MoU:

- UNEP/CMS Secretariat (23 November 2005)
- Ministry of Nature and Environment of Mongolia (23 November 2005)
- International Council for Game and Wildlife Conservation (23 November 2005)
- IUCN/SSC (23 November 2005)
- WWF International (23 November 2005)
- Fauna and Flora International (24 September 2006)
- Frankfurt Zoological Society (24 September 2006)
- Wildlife Conservation Society (24 September 2006)
- ACBK Association for the Conservation of Biodiversity of Kazakhstan (10 September 2010)
- The Saiga Conservation Alliance (10 September 2010)
- NABU Nature and Biodiversity Conservation Union Germany (29 October 2015)

== Aim of MoU ==
Since the collapse of the Soviet Union in 1991, Saiga populations declined by more than 95% (scientists estimate that only 64,400-69,400 Saigas remain from a former population of nearly 2 million), primarily due to poaching for the species’ meat and horn and Chinese traditional medicine. Being one of the fastest population collapses of large mammals recently observed, the MoU aims to reduce current exploitation levels and restore the population status of these nomads of the Central Asian steppes.

== Species covered by MoU ==
Until 2002 only the sub-species Saiga tatarica tatarica was listed on the CMS Appendix II and thus the scope of the MoU was limited to this sub-species. In 2008 however, all Saiga spp. were listed on Appendix II and at the Second Meeting of Signatories the species coverage of the MoU was extended to the entire species.

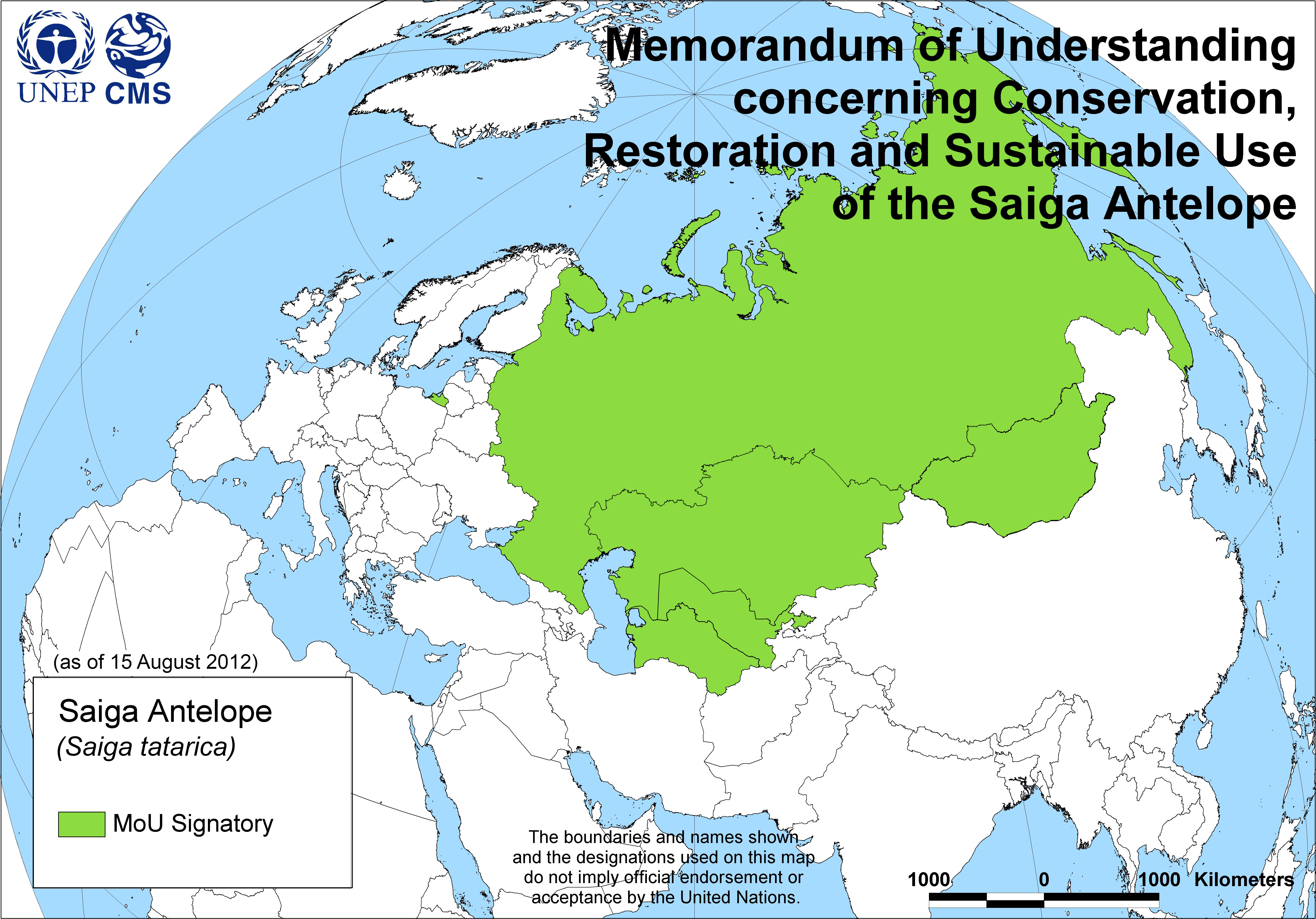
Map of Signatories to the Saiga Antelope MoU, as of 15 August 2012

== Fundamental components ==
All Signatories agree to collaborate to improve the conservation status of the Saiga antelope throughout its range, and undertake national and joint activities to conserve restore and sustainably use the species and those habitats and ecosystems important for its long-term survival. Therefore, they shall, individually or collectively:

1. Provide effective protection for the Saiga antelope and, where feasible and appropriate, conserve, restore and sustainably use those habitats and ecosystems that are important for its long-term survival
2. Implement the provisions of the Action Plan, adopted in 2006
3. Assess regularly the implementation of the Saiga antelope MoU and the Action Plan
4. Facilitate the exchange of scientific, technical and legal information to undertake coordinated measures to conserve, restore and sustainably use the Saiga antelope, and cooperate with other States, intergovernmental organizations, non-governmental organizations and other bodies interested in the implementation process
5. Provide to the CMS Secretariat detailed reports on the implementation of the MoU

The MoU took effect immediately after at least three of the range States signed it (24 September 2006) and shall remain in effect indefinitely subject to the right of any Signatory to terminate its participation by providing one year’s written notice to all of the other Signatories.

== Meetings ==
=== Meeting of Signatories ===
Meetings of Signatories are organized regularly to review the conservation status of the Saiga antelope and the implementation of the MoU and Action Plan. National reports by individual Signatories and a report prepared by the Secretariat are also submitted.

The First Meeting of Signatories took place in Almaty, Kazakhstan, 25–26 September 2006. Previous to the meeting a two-day Technical Workshop was organized. During the First Meeting of Signatories the following points were addressed:

- Share information on the conservation status of the Saiga antelope within the respective range States and the status of implementation of the Action Plan
- Adopt a Medium Term International Work Programme to support the implementation of the MoU and Action Plan

The Signatories represented at the meeting were Turkmenistan, Uzbekistan and Kazakhstan. The other two range States, the Russian Federation and Mongolia, were also represented. Additionally, China and the United States were also present. Finally, a number of organizations such as UNDP Kazakhstan, NABU and TRAFFIC attended the meeting.

The Second Meeting of Signatories was convened by CMS and took place in Ulaanbaatar, Mongolia, 7–10 September 2010, preceded by a technical meeting. The Meeting of Signatories:

- Adopted a Medium Term International Work Programme for 2011-2015
- Agreed to expand the MoU to cover all Saigas, and thus to amend its title to refer to “Saiga spp.” instead of only “Saiga tatarica tatarica”. This meant that Mongolia became a formal Range State to the MoU and its signature was welcomed

The Signatories represented at the meeting were Turkmenistan, Uzbekistan, Kazakhstan, the Russian Federation and Mongolia. China as well as a number of organizations such as IUCN, CITES and IFAW also attended the meeting.

=== Other Saiga meetings ===
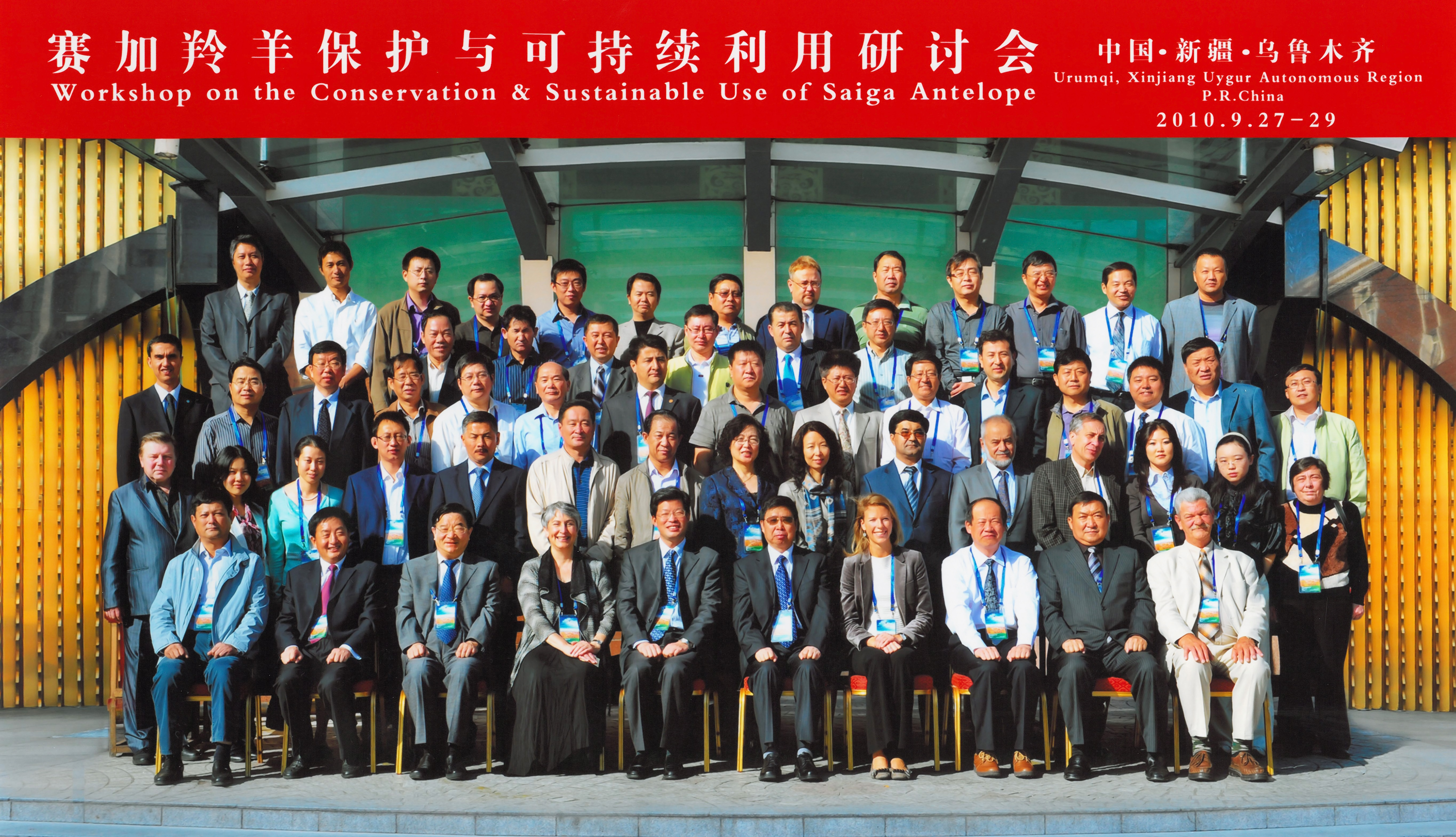
Workshop on the Conservation and Sustainable Use of Saiga Antelope Urumqi, China, 27–29 September 2010

From 27–29 September 2010 a Workshop on the Conservation and Sustainable Use of Saiga Antelope was organized in Urumqi, China. The workshop focused on strengthening international cooperation among consumer and range States and provide a platform for discussion between the Asian traditional medicine industry and those managing conservation activities for the species.

From 17–18 February 2011 a Workshop on the Implementation and Coordination of the Saiga Antelope (Saiga spp.) Memorandum of Understanding (MoU) and other CMS Instruments for Migratory Ungulates was held in Astana, Kazakhstan. During this workshop priority activities for Saiga conservation in Kazakhstan were agreed and technical coordination arrangements for 2011 for the MoU with the Association for the Conservation of Biodiversity of Kazakhstan (ACBK) and the Saiga Conservation Alliance (SCA) were confirmed.

== Secretariat ==
The CMS Secretariat – located in Bonn, Germany – acts as the secretariat to the MoU. One of the main tasks of the secretariat is to prepare an overview report compiled on the basis of information at its disposal pertaining to the Saiga antelope. Furthermore, the secretariat also acts as the Depositary.

== Action Plan and Medium Term International Work Programme ==
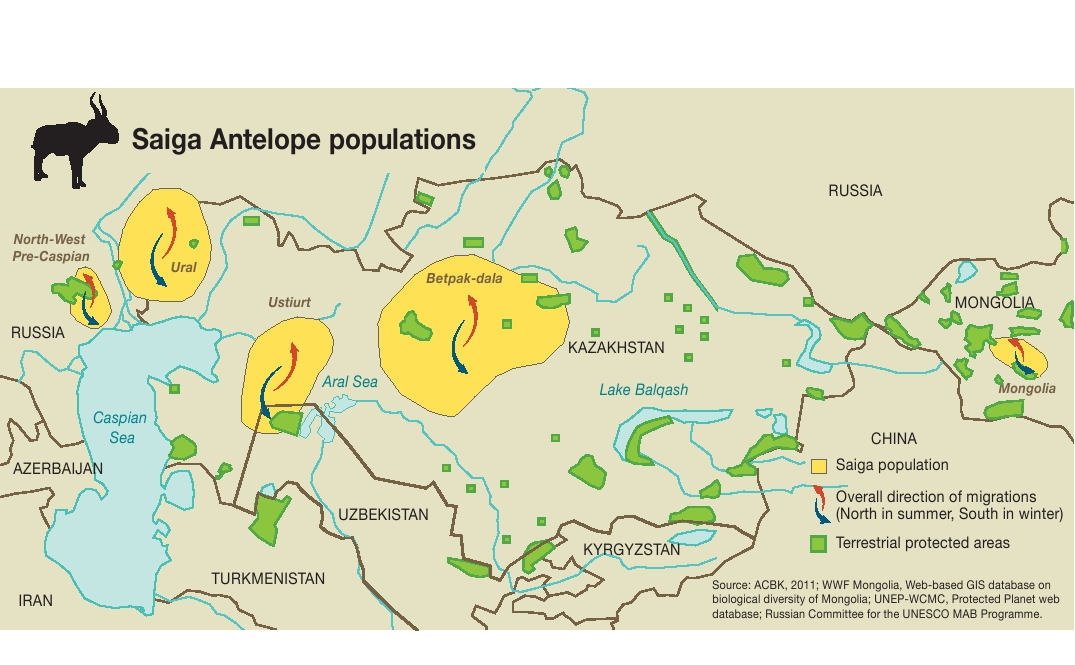
Saiga Antelope populations Map

The MoU includes a detailed Action Plan, which was first developed in 2002 at a preparatory meeting in Elista, Russian Federation. It has been drafted in consideration of biological, economic and social research, as well as practical information provided by a range of stakeholders and came into force in 2006. The Action Plan provides a road map to guide the implementation of conservation action for the Saiga antelope in the range States and in those countries which import Saiga products, such as the species’ horn. It has three main objectives:

- Restore populations to ecologically and biologically appropriate levels throughout the species’ range
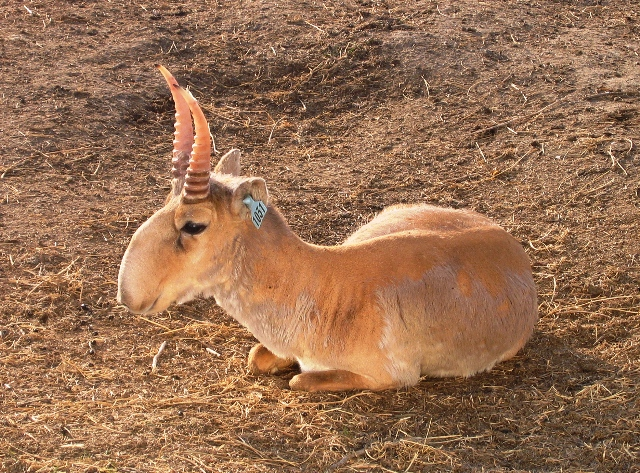
  Saiga Antelope (Saiga tatarica)
- Restoring the range and habitats of Saiga antelopes to optimal levels
- Enhance transboundary and international cooperation to conserve and sustainably use Saigas

To reach these objectives activities focus on:

- Improved monitoring of the status of individual populations, including participatory monitoring with local people
- Application of the same recommended monitoring methodology throughout range States
- Assessment of species’ distribution, spatial and temporal variation in breeding pastures and migratory routes
- Reduction and control of Saiga poaching
- Creation of alternative livelihood options in rural villages that depend on poaching for income and employment; creation of incentives for conservation at local level
- Awareness raising (regional, national and international levels)
- Improvement of the protected area network, focusing on birth and rutting areas and including transboundary protection areas
- Application of captive breeding where appropriate; knowledge transfer on techniques
- Reduction and control of illegal trade in Saiga products; compliance with CITES provisions
- Assessment of long-term conservation solutions, including sustainable use if populations have recovered to a level that would allow for such use

The Medium Term International Work Programme (MTIWP) is the primary road map for conservation actions under the Saiga antelope MoU and is regularly updated. It is this work programme which is used to implement the MoU and to review progress; it reflects the highest priorities for action for a period of five years in order to support the Action Plan’s implementation. The MTIWP for 2007-2011 was adopted at the first Meeting of Signatories in 2006; the MTIWP for 2011-2015 was adopted at the second Meeting of Signatories in 2010.

== Altyn Dala Conservation Initiative ==
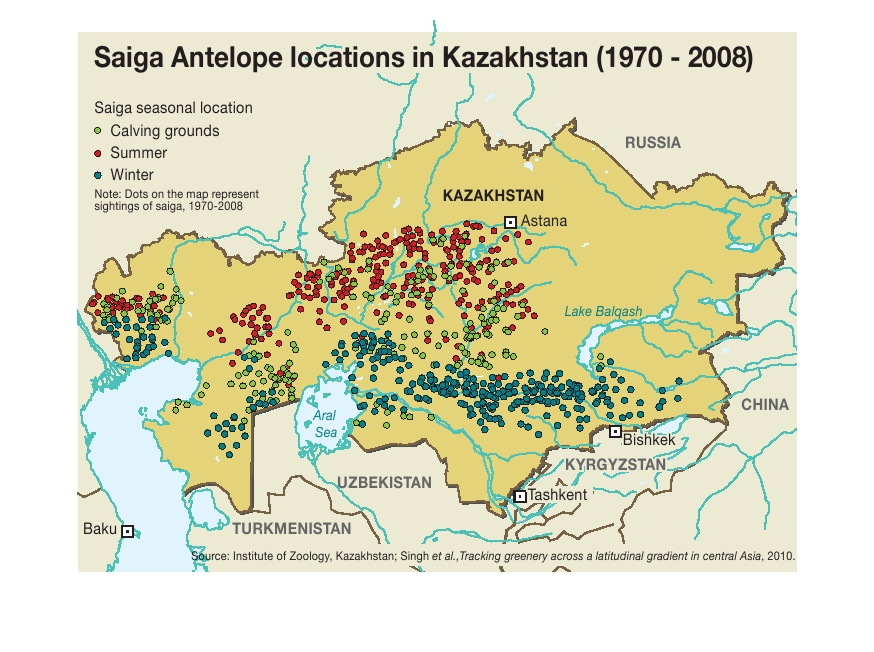
Saiga Antelope locations in Kazakhstan (1970-2008)

The Altyn Dala Conservation Initiative (ADCI) is a large scale programme to conserve the northern steppe and semi desert ecosystems and their Critically Endangered species like the Saiga antelope. The ADCI is an initiative of the Kazakh Committee of Forestry and Hunting (CFH) of the Ministry of Agriculture and the Ministry of Environment Protection and is implemented by the Association for the Conservation of Biodiversity of Kazakhstan (ACBK) in partnership with the Frankfurt Zoological Society (FZS) and the Royal Society for the Protection of Birds (RSPB).

The programme started in 2006, uses an ecosystem approach and focuses on an area of about 55 million hectares. The main objectives are:

- Address the main threats to the future viability of the Betpak-dala Saiga population and its habitats, such as poaching as well as habitat conversion and fragmentation
- Establish a network of protected areas of various categories and corridors to conserve the migration routes and habitats of Saigas
- Identify and put in place key enabling conditions such as the genuine involvement of local communities and other relevant stakeholders, as well as ensuring tangible contributions to people’s livelihoods and rural development
- Gather baseline understanding of the Kazakh steppe and semi desert ecosystems and their species in order to inform the planning and implementation of these conservation measures
- Raise awareness and understanding for steppe and Saiga conservation nationally and internationally

One of the biggest achievements to date is the improvement of the population status of the Betpak-Dala Saiga population, which increased more than fourfold since 2006 as a result of joint efforts of the Kazakhstan government, the ADCI and its partners – from estimated 18,600 individuals in 2006 to estimated 78,000 individuals in 2011.

Despite this good news, the Kazakh Saiga population is still at risk. In 2010 about 15 percent of the Saiga antelope population (around 12,000 individuals) died by an outbreak of pasteurellosis, a disease affecting the lungs, within a 4,500 hectare area of western Kazakhstan.

== Cooperation with other organizations ==
In 1995 the Saiga antelope was included in Appendix II of the Convention on International Trade in Endangered Species of Wild Fauna and Flora (CITES) to primarily address the illegal trade in Saiga horn. Since one of the main conservation needs is to reduce and control poaching of the species for their meat and horn, CMS and CITES closely collaborate to address both Saiga population management and illegal trade in order to contribute towards the international conservation of this flagship species of the Eurasian steppes. In the Joint Work Programme between CMS and CITES for the period 2012-2014, the Saiga species are one of the target groups for joint activities.

To coordinate communication, the newsletter Saiga News was launched in 2005 by the Saiga Conservation Alliance. It is published bi-annually in English and Range State languages and can be accessed through the Saiga Conservation Alliance website.
