= Damdiny Demberel =

Former Chairman of the State Great Khural of Mongolia

- Дамдины Дэмбэрэл
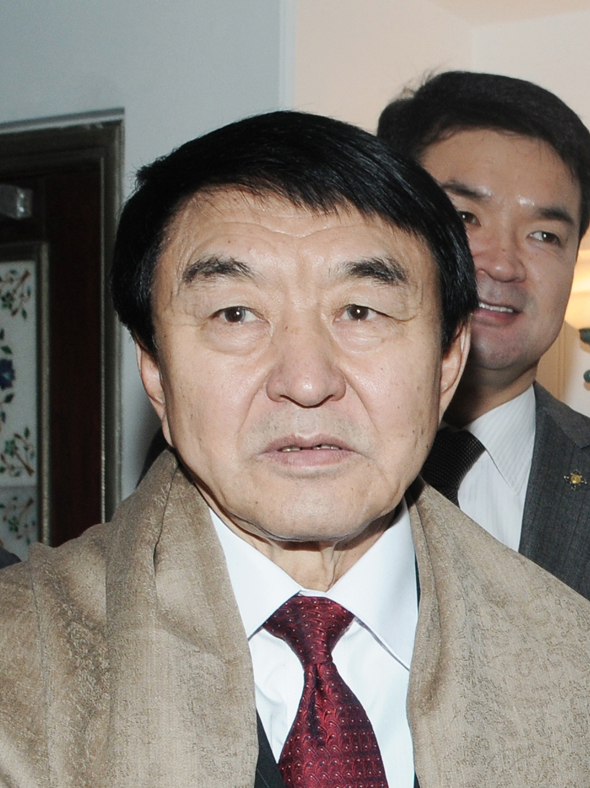
- Demberel in 2010

Chairman of the State Great Khural
- In office September 2008 – July 2012
- Prime Minister: Sanjiin Bayar; Sükhbaataryn Batbold
- Preceded by: Danzangiin Lundeejantsan
- Succeeded by: Zandaakhüügiin Enkhbold

Personal details
- Born: April 15, 1941 (age 84) Khovd Province, Mongolia
- Party: Mongolian People's Party

Damdiny Demberel (Mongolian: Дамдины Дэмбэрэл; born on April 15, 1941, in Mankhan Sum, Khovd Aimag) is a retired Mongolian politician who served as the Chairman of the State Great Khural from 2008 to 2012.

== Education ==
- In 1960, Demberel finished 10 year secondary school 1 of Khovd city.
- In 1964, he graduated from the School of Economics, Ulaanbaatar majoring in Trading Economics and Technology
- In 1977, he graduated from the Academy of Social Sciences, Moscow, Soviet Union majoring in politics.

== Career ==
=== Before 1990 ===
- In 1964-1968, Demberel worked as Deputy Chief of the Trade and Procurement Administration of Khovd Aimag.
- In 1968-1970, he was Director and Lecturer at the Political and Enlightenment Cabinet, Mongolian People's Revolutionary Party (MPRP) Committee of Khovd Aimag
- In 1970-1972, he was First-Secretary of the Revolutionary Youth Union Committee of Khovd Aimag
- In 1972-1975, he was Director of Union Organization Unit, Central Committee of the Mongolian Revolutionary Youth Union
- In 1977-1990, he worked at the Central Committee, MPRP as an organizer and a group leader

=== After 1990 ===
In 1990-1992, Demberel was First-Secretary of the MPRP Committee of Zavkhan Aimag. In 1992, he was elected to the State Small Hural of Mongolia. Since then, he has not lost any election to the State Great Khural. He was elected as an MP five times, i.e., in 1992, 1996, 2000, 2004 and 2008 and has been serving his fifth term.

While he was a Member of Parliament, he held important posts in the State Great Khural, i.e., he was the Leader of the MPRP Group in the State Great Khural in 1992-1994, Chairman of the Standing Committee on Government Structure in 2000-2004, has been Minister for Social Welfare and Labor since 2007, and was Speaker of the State Great Khural from 2008 to 2012.

== Sources ==
- Demberel's biography
- Demberel's biography
