= Mankhan Nature Reserve =

Nature reserve in Mankhan, Khovd, Mongolia

Coordinates: 47°24′00″N 92°06′00″E

Mankhan Nature Reserve is a reserve that lies mostly in Mankhan, Khovd Province, Mongolia. The reserve stretches over 3,000 square kilometres (1,200 mi^{2}) and has been created in 1993 together with Sharga Nature Reserve to protect the endangered Mongolian saiga. In addition to these antelopes, there are also goitered gazelles.
