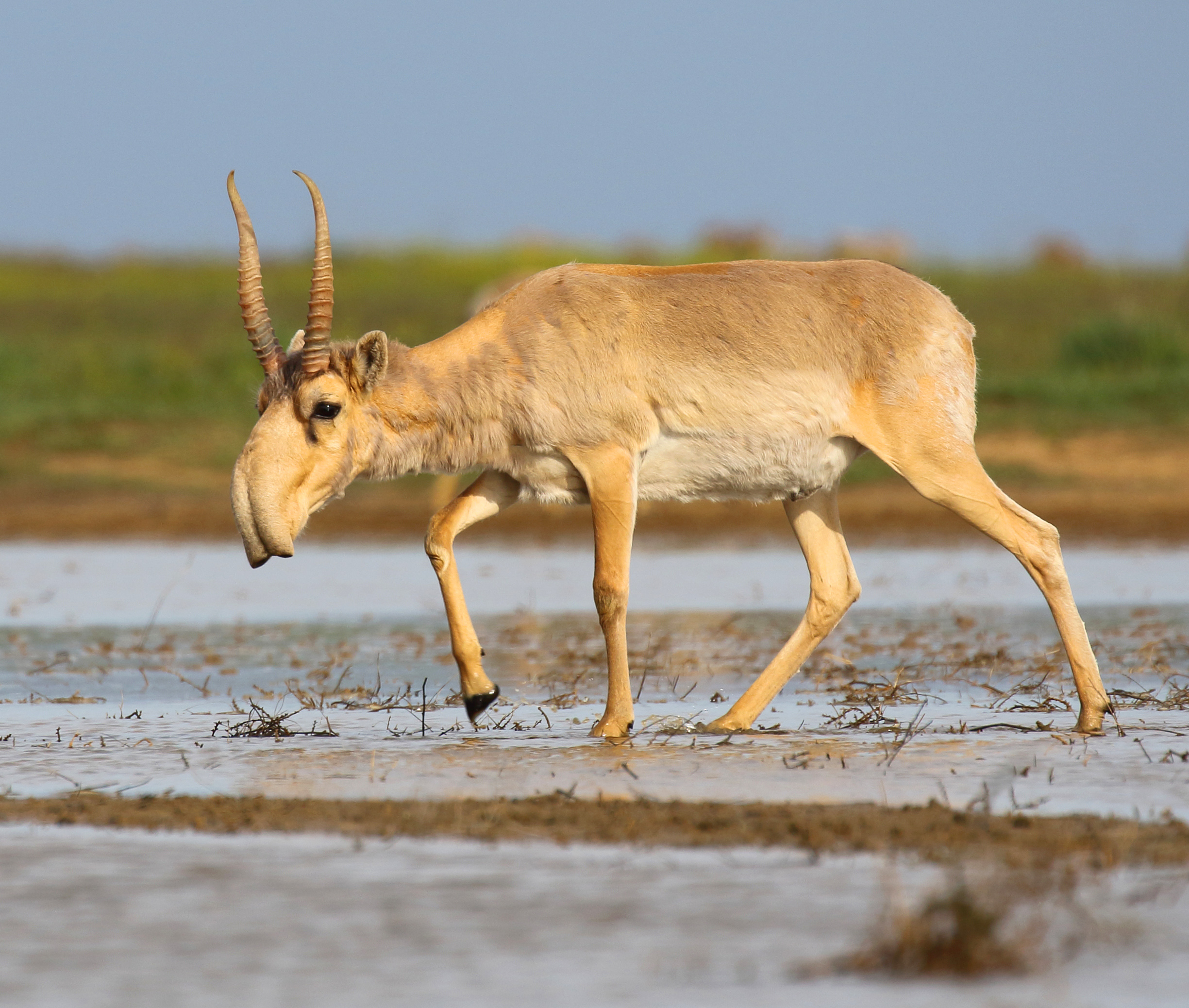
- A male at the Stepnoi Nature Sanctuary of Astrakhan Oblast, Russia
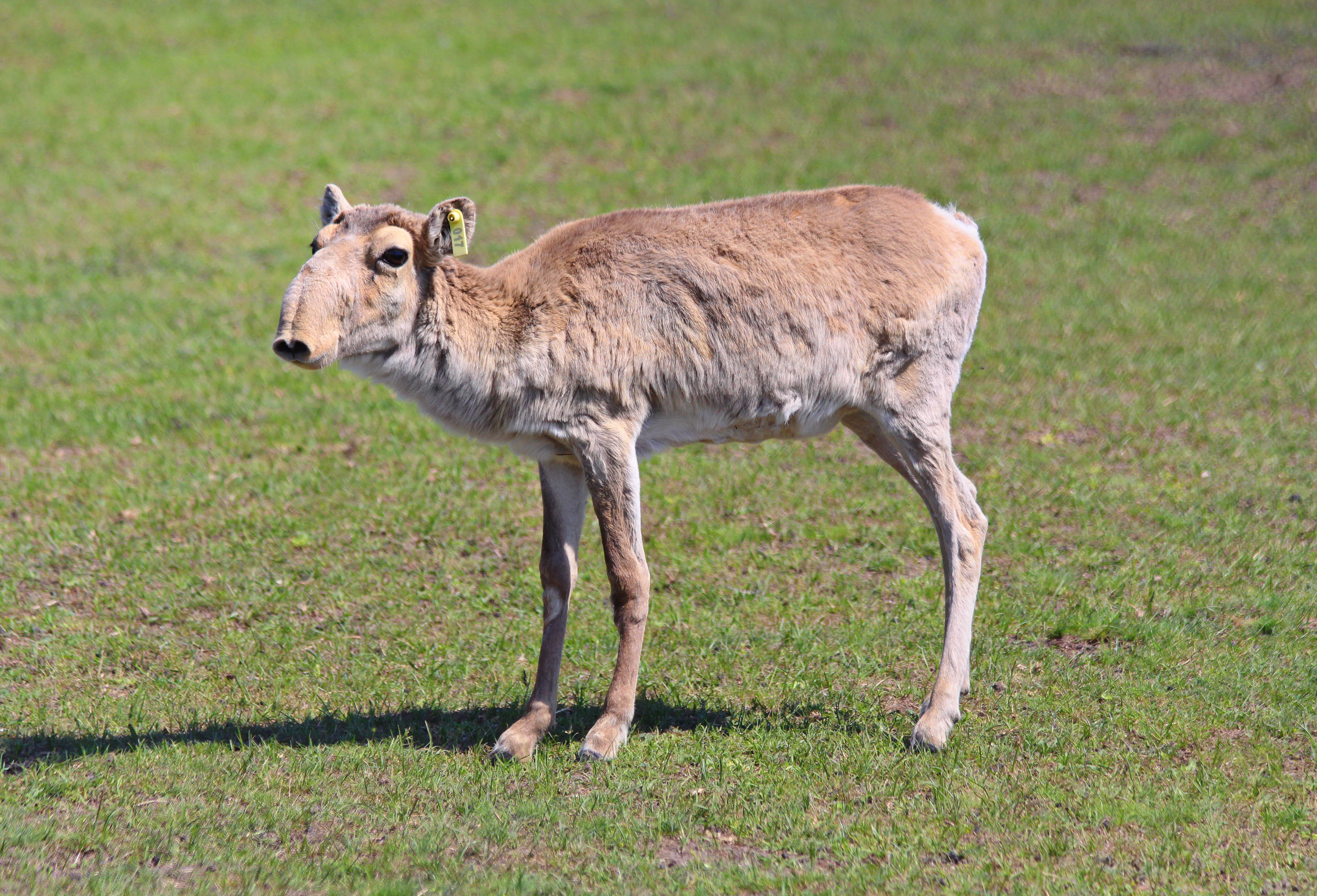
- A female at the Askania-Nova Biosphere Reserve of Kakhovka Raion, Ukraine

Conservation status
- Near Threatened (IUCN 3.1)
- CITES Appendix II

Scientific classification
- Kingdom: Animalia
- Phylum: Chordata
- Class: Mammalia
- Order: Artiodactyla
- Family: Bovidae
- Subfamily: Antilopinae
- Tribe: Saigini
- Genus: Saiga; Gray, 1843
- Species: S. tatarica

Binomial name
- Saiga tatarica (Linnaeus, 1766)

Subspecies
- S. t. tatarica; S. t. mongolica
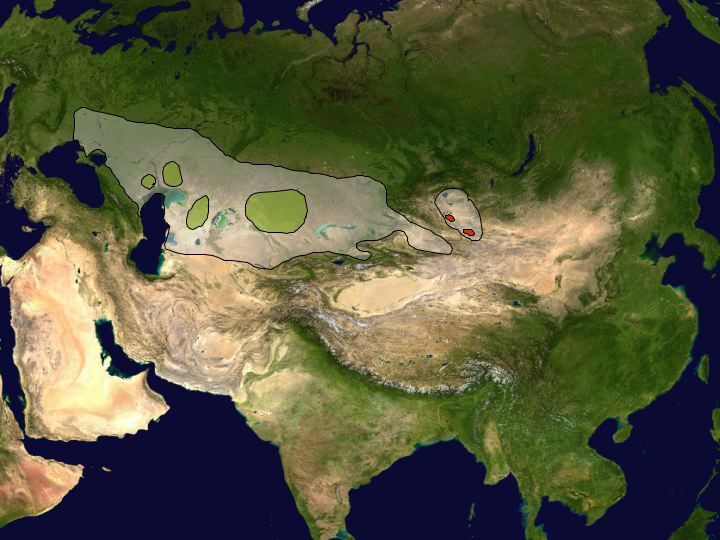
- Reconstructed range (white) and current distribution of the two subspecies Saiga tatarica tatarica (green) and S. t. mongolica (red).

Synonyms
- List: Antilope saiga Pallas, 1766; Antilope scythica Pallas, 1766; Capra tatarica Linnaeus, 1766; Capra sayga Forster, 1768; Cemas colus Oken, 1816; Ibex imberbis S. G. Gmelin, 1760

= Saiga antelope =

Saiga antelope Temporal range: Pleistocene–Recent

Species of antelope

The saiga antelope (Saiga tatarica, /ˈsaɪɡə/), or simply saiga, is a species of antelope which during antiquity inhabited a vast area of the Eurasian steppe, spanning the foothills of the Carpathian Mountains in the northwest and Caucasus in the southwest into Mongolia in the northeast and Dzungaria in the southeast. During the Pleistocene, it ranged across the mammoth steppe from the British Isles to Beringia. Today, the dominant subspecies (S. t. tatarica) only occurs in Kalmykia and Astrakhan Oblast of Russia and in the Ural Mountains, Ustyurt Plateau and Betpak-Dala regions of Kazakhstan. A portion of the Ustyurt population migrates south to Uzbekistan and occasionally to Turkmenistan in winter. It is regionally extinct in Romania, Ukraine, Moldova, China and southwestern Mongolia. The Mongolian subspecies (S. t. mongolica) occurs only in western Mongolia.

== Taxonomy and phylogeny ==
The scientific name Capra tatarica was coined by Carl Linnaeus in 1766 in the 12th edition of Systema Naturae. It was reclassified as Saiga tatarica and is the sole living member of the genus Saiga. Two subspecies are recognised:

- S. t. tatarica (Linnaeus, 1766): also known as the Russian saiga, it is only to be found today in central Asia.
- S. t. mongolica Bannikov, 1946: also known as the Mongolian saiga, it is sometimes treated as an independent species, or as subspecies of the Pleistocene Saiga borealis; it is confined to Mongolia.

In 1945, American paleontologist George Gaylord Simpson classified both in the tribe Saigini under the same subfamily, Caprinae. Subsequent authors were not certain about the relationship between the two, until phylogenetic studies in the 1990s revealed that though morphologically similar, the Tibetan antelope is closer to the Caprinae while the saiga is closer to the Antilopinae.

In a revision of the phylogeny of the tribe Antilopini on the basis of nuclear and mitochondrial data in 2013, Eva Verena Bärmann (of the University of Cambridge) and colleagues showed that the saiga is sister to the clade formed by the springbok (Antidorcas marsupialis) and the gerenuk (Litocranius walleri). The study noted that the saiga and the springbok could be considerably different from the rest of the antilopines; a 2007 phylogenetic study suggested that the two form a clade sister to the gerenuk. The cladogram below is based on the 2013 study.

- - Antilopini
    - - - - - Gazella (chinkara, dorcas gazelle and kin)
            - Blackbuck (Antilope cervicapra)
          - - Nanger (dama gazelle, Grant's gazelle and kin)
            - Eudorcas (Thomson's gazelle and kin)
        - - Springbok (Antidorcas marsupialis)
          - Gerenuk (Litocranius walleri)
    - Saiga antelope (Saiga tatarica)

== Evolution ==
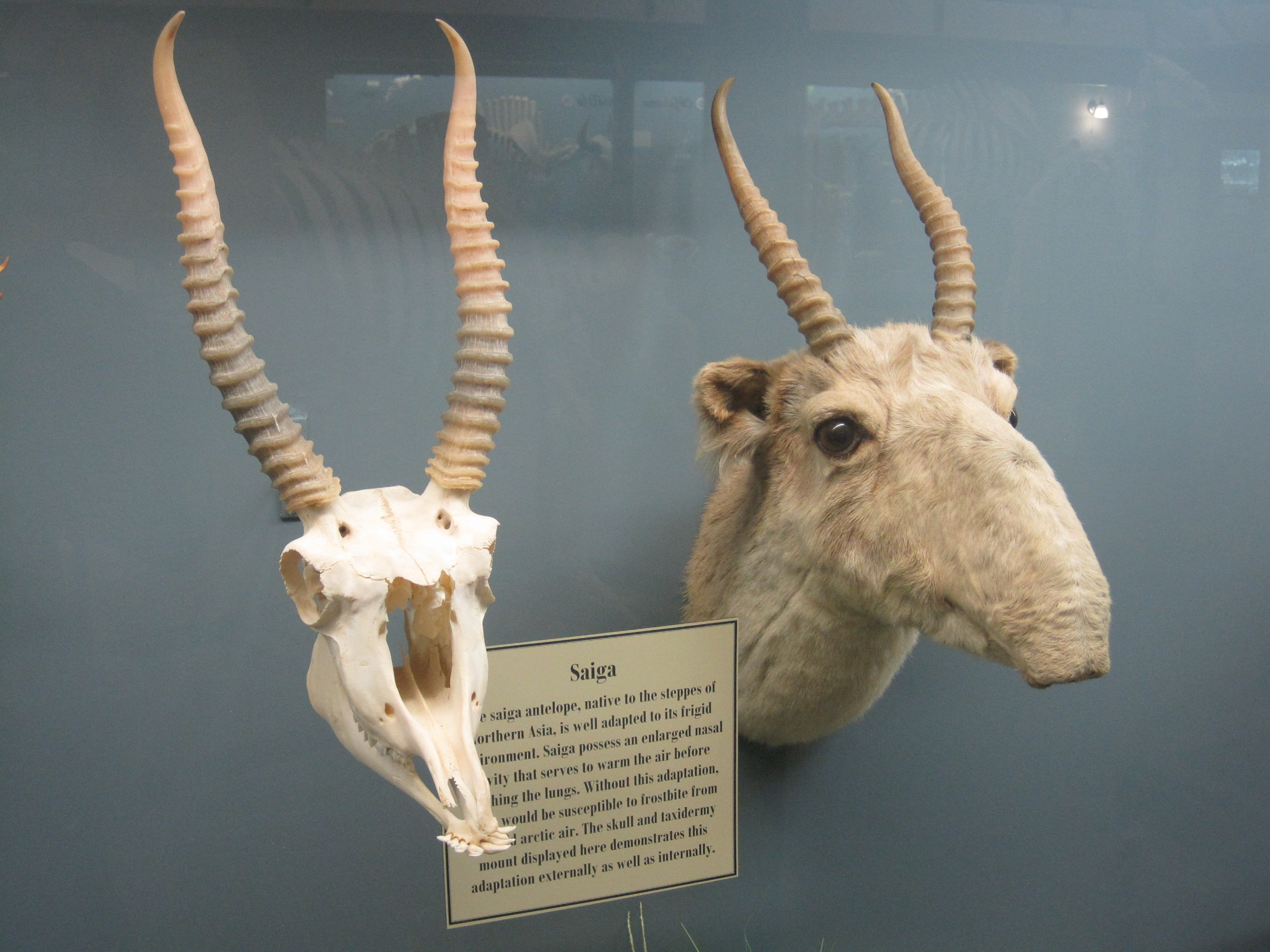
Saiga antelope skull and taxidermy mount on display at the Museum of Osteology

Fossils of saiga, concentrated mainly in central and northern Eurasia, date to as early as the late Pleistocene (nearly 0.1 Mya). Several species of extinct Saiga from the Pleistocene of Eurasia and Alaska have been named, including S. borealis, S. prisca, S. binagadensis and S. ricei, although more recent studies suggest that these prehistoric representatives were merely geographical variants of the extant species that was formerly much more widespread. Fossils excavated from the Buran Kaya III site (Crimea) date back to the transition from Pleistocene to Holocene. The morphology of saiga does not seem to have changed significantly since prehistoric times.

Before the Holocene, the saiga ranged across the mammoth steppe from as far west as modern-day England and France to as far east as northern Siberia, Alaska, and probably Canada. The antelope gradually entered the Urals, though it did not colonise southern Europe. A 2010 study revealed that a steep decline has occurred in the genetic variability of the saiga since the late Pleistocene-Holocene, probably due to a population bottleneck.

== Characteristics ==
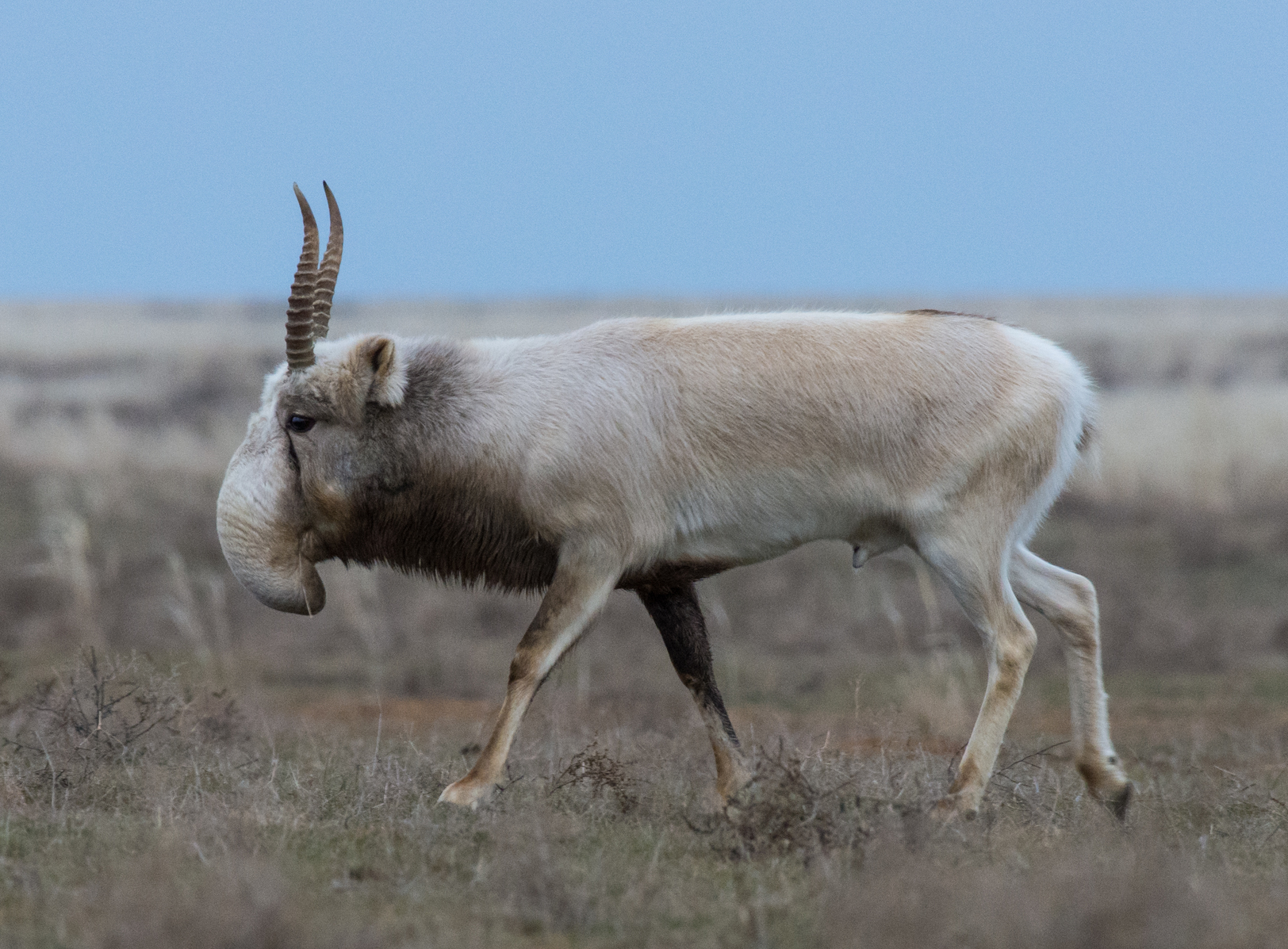
Male saiga in Kalmykia

A prominent feature of the saiga is the pair of closely spaced, bloated nostrils directed downward. Other facial features include the proboscis, dark markings on the cheeks and the 7–12 cm (2.8–4.7 in) long ears. Its head-and-body length is typically between 100 and 140 cm (39 and 55 in) with a 6–12 cm (2.4–4.7 in) short tail, and it stands 61–81 cm (24–32 in) at the shoulder. It weighs 26–69 kg (57–152 lb).

The coat shows seasonal changes. In summer, the coat appears yellow to red, fading toward the flanks. The Mongolian saiga can develop a sandy colour. The coat develops a pale, grayish-brown colour in winter, with a hint of brown on the belly and the neck. The ventral parts are generally white. The hair is 18–30 mm (0.71–1.18 in) long in summer and can grow up to 40–70 mm (1.6–2.8 in) in winter. This forms a 12 to 15 cm (4.7 to 5.9 in) long mane on the neck. Two distinct moults occur, one in spring from April to May and another in autumn from late September or early October to late November or early December.

Only males have horns, which are thick and slightly translucent, wax-coloured and show 12 to 20 pronounced rings. With a base diameter of 25–33 mm (0.98–1.30 in), the horns of the Russian saiga measure 28–38 cm (11–15 in) in length; the horns of the Mongolian saiga reach a maximum length of 22 cm (8.7 in).

== Ecology and behaviour ==
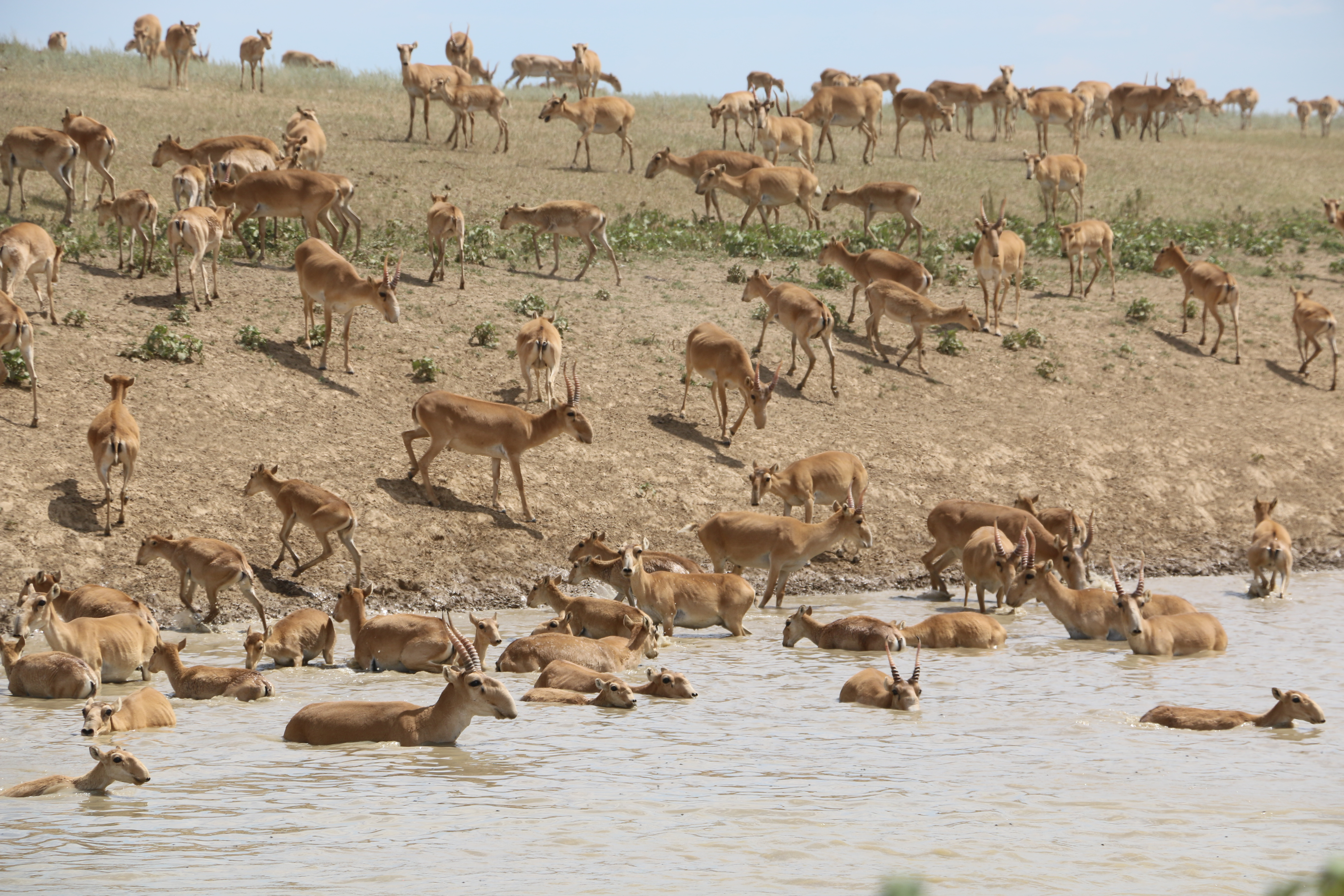
Herd of saiga antelope gathered at the water's edge in western Kazakhstan

Saigas form very large herds that graze in semideserts, steppes, grasslands, and possibly open woodlands, eating several species of plants, including some that are poisonous to other animals. They can cover long distances and swim across rivers, but they avoid steep or rugged areas. The mating season starts in November, when stags fight for the acceptance of females. The winner leads a herd of five to ten, occasionally up to 50 females. In springtime, mothers come together en masse to give birth.

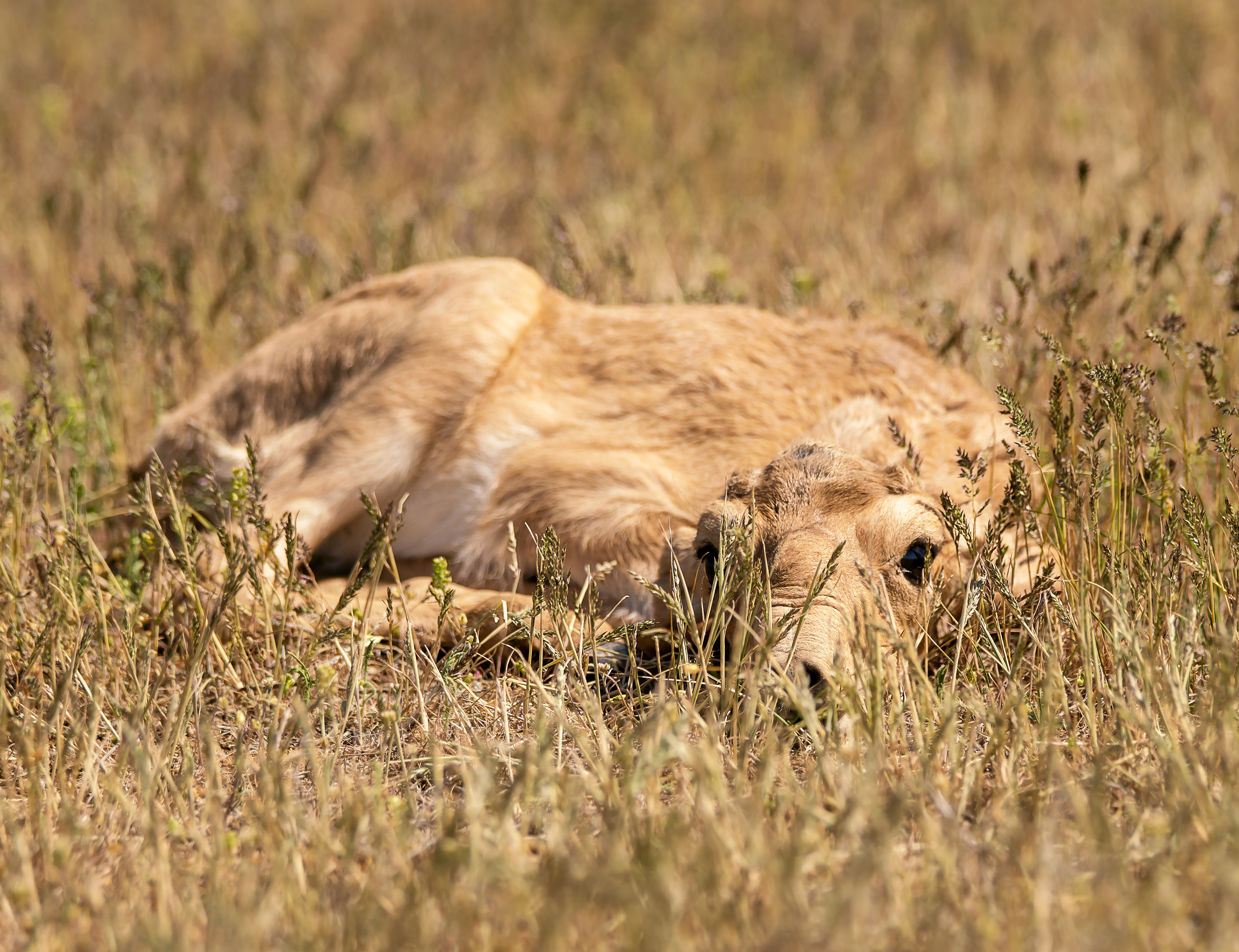
Fawn hiding in steppe grass

Saigas, like the Mongolian gazelles, are known for their extensive migrations across the steppes that allow them to escape natural calamities. Saigas are highly vulnerable to wolves. Juveniles are targeted by foxes, steppe eagles, golden eagles and ravens.

== Distribution and habitat ==
=== Kazakh saiga ===
Kazakhstan is home to the vast majority of saigas in the world, approximately 99%. In the 2000s to mid-2010s, the populations declined enormously – as much as 95% in 15 years. This led the saiga to be classified as critically endangered on the IUCN Red List. Kazakh saiga populations numbered just 21,000 in 2003. In more recent years, the saiga has experienced massive regrowth. As of 2022, there is an estimated number of 1.38 million saiga surviving in Kazakhstan, per an April aerial count. As of December 2023, the global saiga antelope population is estimated to number 922,600–988,500 mature individuals.

In May 2010, an estimated 12,000 of the 26,000 saiga population in the Ural region of Kazakhstan were found dead. Although the deaths are currently being ascribed to pasteurellosis, an infectious disease that strikes the lungs and intestines, the underlying trigger remains to be identified. In May 2015, what may be the same disease broke out in three northern regions of the country. As of 28 May 2015, more than 120,000 saigas had been confirmed dead in the Betpak-Dala population in central Kazakhstan, representing more than a third of the global population. By April 2016, the saigas appeared to be making a comeback, with an increase of population from 31,000 to 36,000 in the Betpak-Dala area. In April 2021 a survey in Kazakhstan found that the saiga population had risen from an estimated 334,000 to 842,000. The population increase was partially attributed to the government crackdown on poaching and the establishment of conservation areas. UK charity RSPB reported in 2022 that, partly due to their conservation efforts, as well as the designation of the Bokey Orda-Ashiozek protected area by the Kazakhstan government, the population had now risen to a peak of 1.32 million. In 2025 the Altyn Dala Conservation Initiative announced that populations in Kazakhstan have reached 3.9 million adults in spring 2025.

=== Former range ===
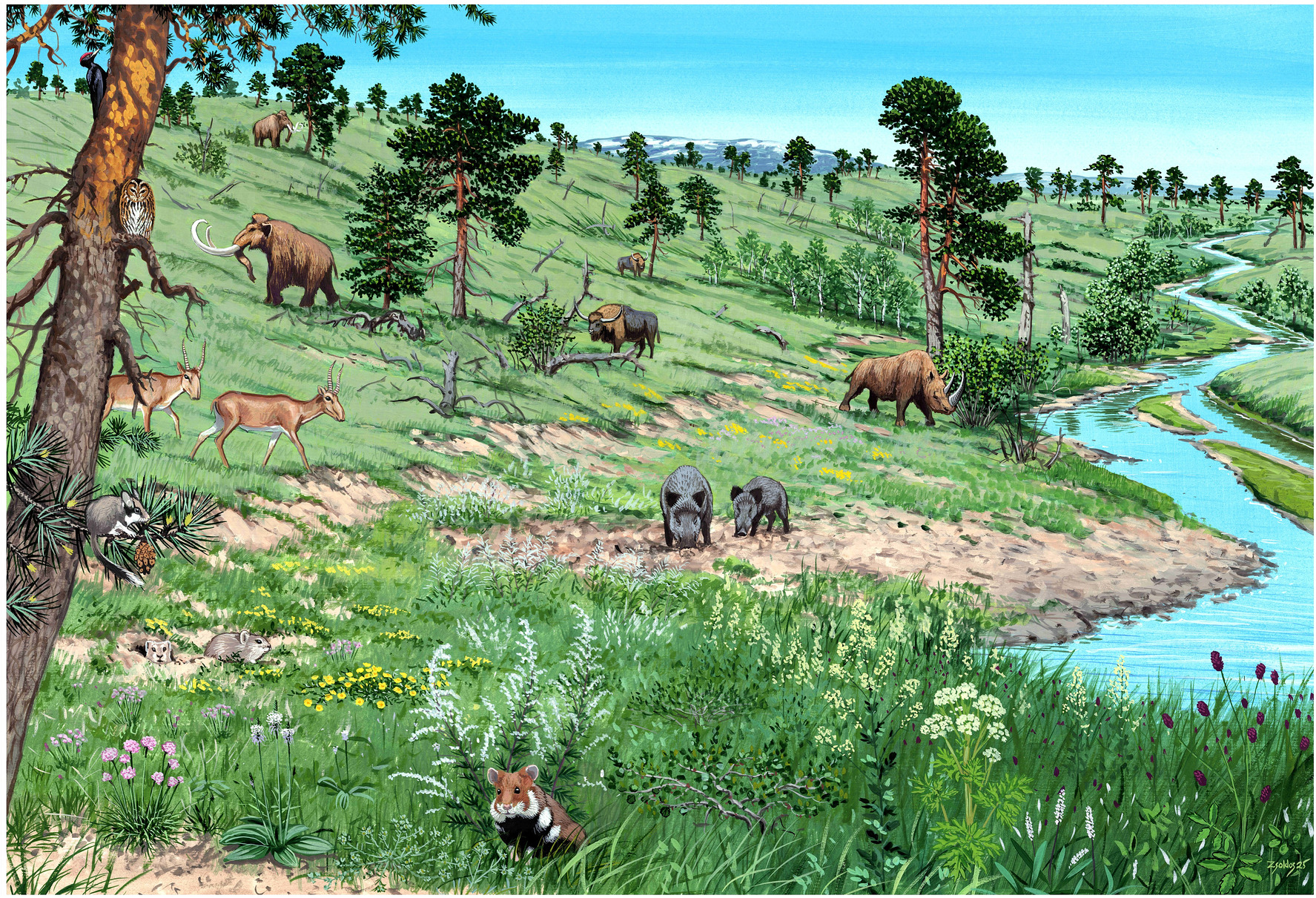
Saiga antelope (left centre) in a Last Glacial Period Central European landscape scene, along with woolly rhinoceros, woolly mammoth, steppe bison, wild boar, European hamster, garden dormouse, black woodpecker and tawny owl

The saiga was not present in Europe during the Last Interglacial (130–115,000 years ago). During the last glacial period (115,000–11,700 years ago), it ranged from the British Isles through Central Asia and the Bering Strait into Alaska and Canada's Yukon and Northwest Territories. By the classical age, they were apparently considered a characteristic animal of Scythia, judging from the historian Strabo's description of an animal called the kolos that was "between the deer and ram in size" and was wrongly believed to drink through its nose.

Considerable evidence shows the importance of the antelope to Andronovo culture settlements. Illustrations of saiga antelopes can be found among the cave paintings that were dated back to seventh to fifth century BC. Moreover, saiga bones were found among the remains of other wild animals near the human settlements.

The fragmented information shows an abundance of saigas on the territory of modern Kazakhstan in the 14th–16th centuries. The migratory routes ranged throughout the country's area, especially the region between the Volga and Ural Rivers was heavily populated. The population's size remained high until the second half of the 19th century, when excessive horn export began. The high price and demand for horns drove radical hunting. The number of animals decreased in all regions and the migratory routes shifted southward. Populations in Ukraine were driven to extirpation in the 18th century.

After a rapid decline, they were nearly completely exterminated in the 1920s, but they were able to recover. By 1950, two million of them were found in the steppes of the USSR. Their population fell drastically following the collapse of the USSR due to uncontrolled hunting and demand for horns in Chinese medicine. At one point, some conservation groups, such as the World Wildlife Fund, encouraged the hunting of this species, as its horn was presented as an alternative to that of a rhinoceros.

=== Mongolian saiga ===
The Mongolian saiga (S. t. mongolica) is found in a small area in western Mongolia around the Sharga and Mankhan Nature Reserves. The saiga population in Mongolia, although still critically endangered, increased by 24% between October 2024 to October 2025, from an estimated 23,215 individuals to 28,857.

== Threats ==
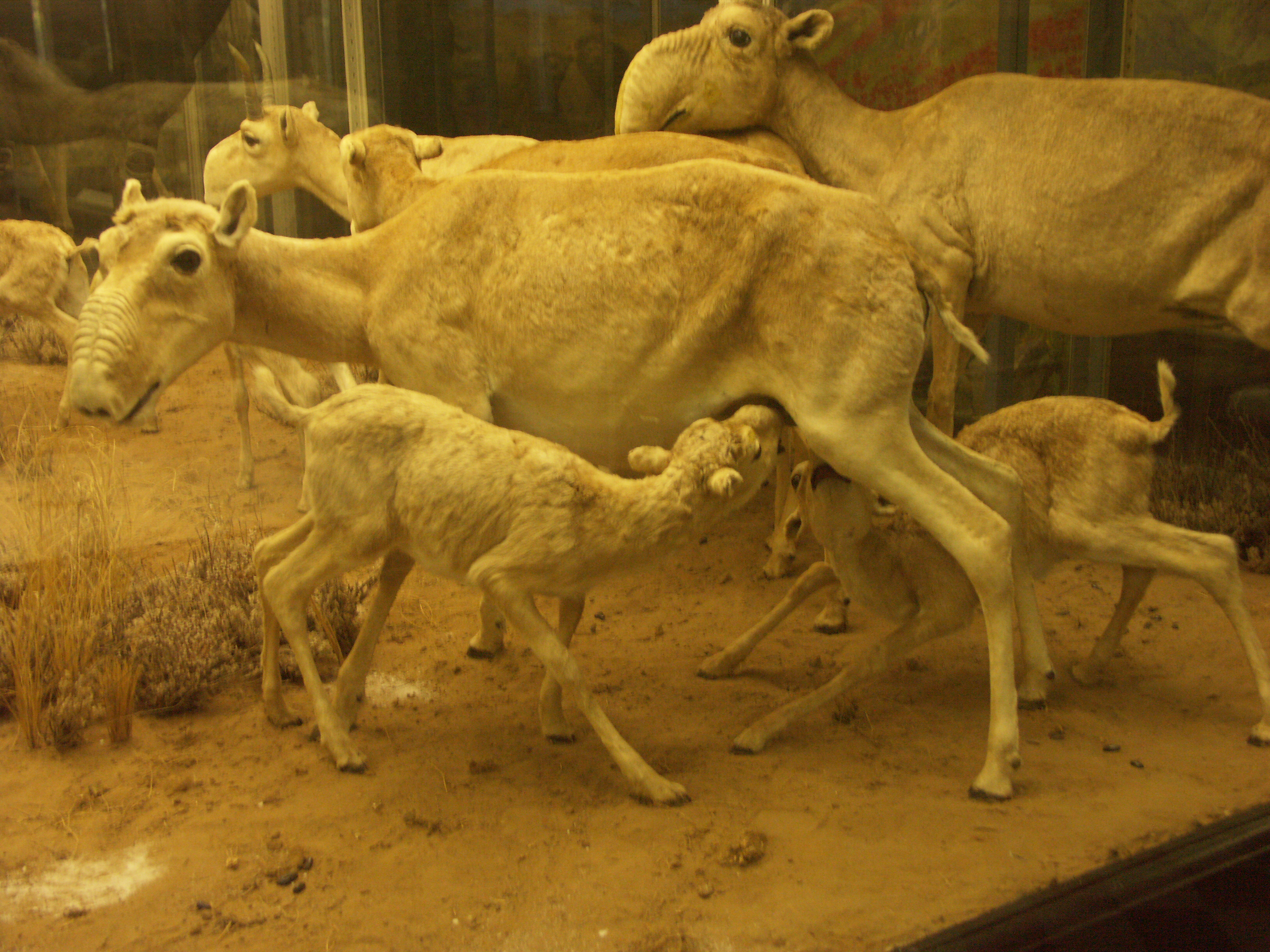
Stuffed saiga herd at The Museum of Zoology, St. Petersburg

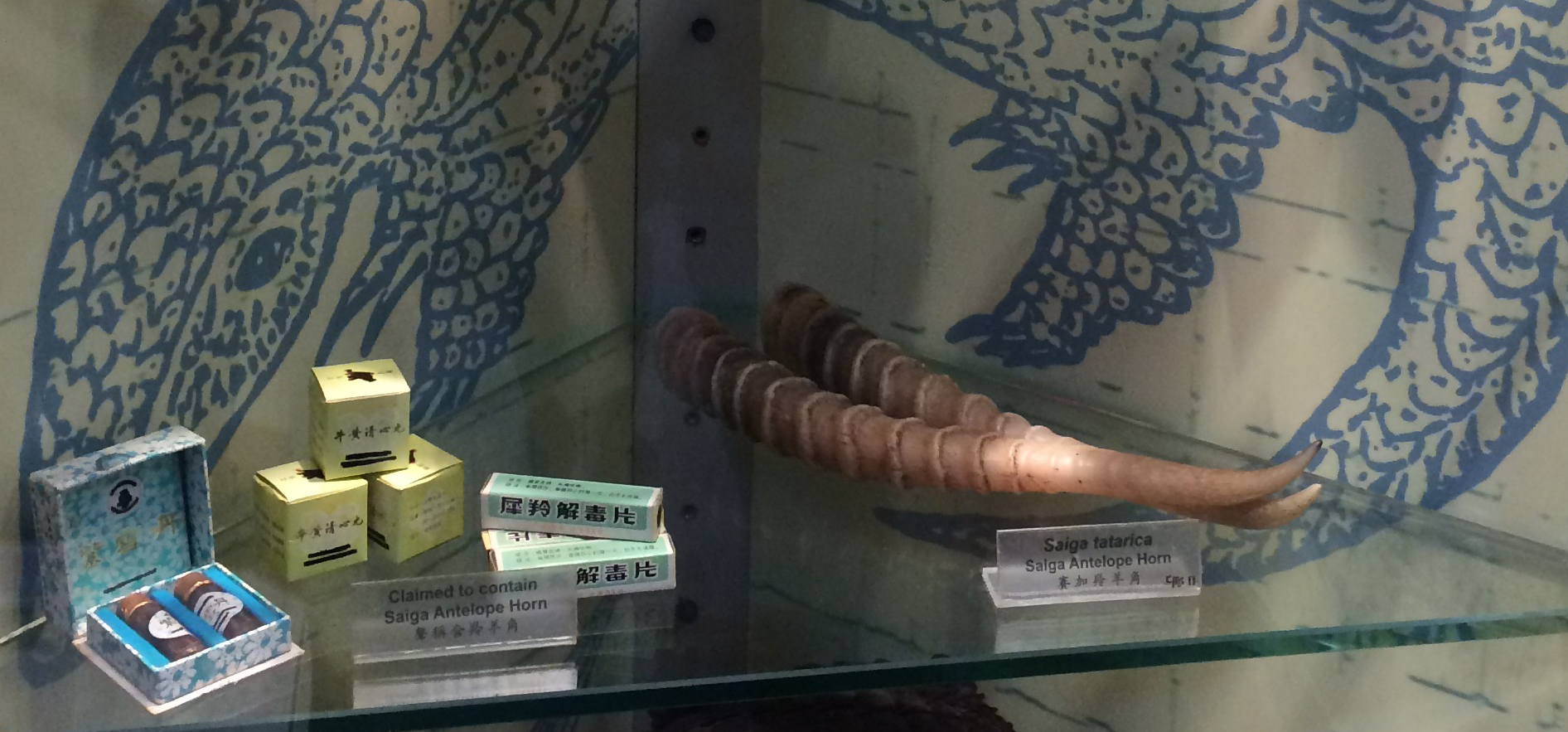
Examples of saiga horn products seized by the Hong Kong government

The horn of the saiga antelope is used in traditional Chinese medicine and can sell for as much as US$150. Demand for the horns drives poaching and smuggling, which has wiped out the population in China, where the saiga antelope is a class I protected species.

In June 2014, Chinese customs at the Kazakh border uncovered 66 cases containing 2,351 saiga antelope horns, estimated to be worth over Y70.5 million (US$11 million). In June 2015, E. J. Milner-Gulland (chair of Saiga Conservation Alliance) said: "Antipoaching needs to be a top priority for the Russian and Kazakh governments."

=== Hunting ===
Saigas have been a target of hunting since prehistoric ages, when hunting was an essential means to acquire food. Saigas' horns, meat, and skin have commercial value and are exported from Kazakhstan.

Saiga horn, known as Cornu Antelopis, is one of the main ingredients in traditional Chinese medicine that is used as an extract or powder additive to the elixirs, ointments, and drinks. Saiga horn's value is equal to rhinoceros horn, whose trade was banned in 1993. Cornu Antelopis is thought to be a cheaper substitute of rare rhino horn in most TCM recipes.

In the period from 1955 to 1989, over 87 thousand tonnes of meat were collected in Kazakhstan by killing more than five million saiga. In 2011, Kazakhstan reaffirmed a ban on hunting saiga and extended this ban until 2021. Hunting of the species was allowed in Kazakhstan in 2025 due to concerns over damage to crops and rapid population growth.

Saiga meat is compared to lamb, considered to be nutritious and delicious. Numerous recipes for cooking the antelope's meat can be found. Both meat and byproducts are sold in the country and outside of it. About 45–80 dm^{2} of skin can be harvested from one individual depending on its age and sex.

=== Physical barriers ===
Agricultural advancement and human settlements have been shrinking habitat areas of the saigas since the 20th century. Occupants limited saiga's passage to water resources and the winter and summer habitats. The ever-changing face of steppe requires saigas to search for new routes to their habitual lands. Currently, saiga populations' migratory routes pass five countries and different human-made constructions, such as railways, trenches, mining sites, and pipelines. These physical barriers limit movement of the antelopes. Cases of saiga herds being trapped within fenced areas and starving to death have been reported.

=== Climatic variability ===
Saigas are dependent on weather and affected by climate fluctuations to a great extent due to their migratory nature. Harsh winters with strong winds or high snow coverage prevent them from feeding on the underlying grass. Population size usually dramatically decreases after severe cold months. Recent trends in climate change have increased the aridity of the steppe region, leading an estimated 14% or more of available pastureland to be considered degraded and useless. Concurrently, small steppe rivers dry faster, limiting water resources to large lakes and rivers, which are usually populated by human settlements; high temperatures in the steppe region lead to springtime floods, in which saiga calves can drown.

=== Mass epizootic mortality ===
==== 1980 to 2015 events ====
For ungulates, mass mortalities are not uncommon. In the 1980s, several saiga die-offs occurred, and between 2010 and 2014, one occurred every year. The deaths could be linked to calving aggregation, which is when they are most vulnerable. More recent research involving a mass die-off in 2015 indicates warmer weather and attendant humidity led bacteria common in saiga antelopes to move into the bloodstream and cause hemorrhagic septicemia.

==== 2015–2016 epizootic ====
In May 2015, uncommonly large numbers of saigas began to die from a mysterious epizootic illness suspected to be pasteurellosis. Herd fatality is 100% once infected, with an estimated 40% of the species' total population already dead. More than 120,000 carcasses had been found by late May 2015, while the estimated total population was only 250,000.

Biologist Murat Nurushev suggested that the cause might be acute ruminal tympany, whose symptoms (bloating, mouth foaming, and diarrhea) had been observed in dead saiga antelopes. According to Nurushev, this disease occurred as a result of foraging on a large amount of easily fermenting plants (alfalfa, clover, sainfoins, and mixed wet, green grass). In May 2015, the United Nations agency which is involved in saiga conservation efforts issued a statement that the mass die-off had ended. By June 2015, no definitive cause for the epizootic had been found.

At a scientific meeting in November 2015 in Tashkent, Uzbekistan, Dr. Richard A. Kock (of the Royal Veterinary College in London) reported that his colleagues and he had narrowed down the possible culprits. Climate change and stormy spring weather, they said, may have transformed harmless bacteria, carried by the saigas, into lethal pathogens.

Pasteurella multocida, a bacterium, was determined to be the cause of death. The bacterium occurs in the antelopes and is normally harmless; the reason for the change in behavior of the bacterium is unknown.

Now, scientists and researchers believe the unusually warm and wet uncontrolled environmental variables caused the bacterium to enter the bloodstream and become septic. Hemorrhagic septicemia is the likely cause of the most recent deaths The change of the bacteria may be attributed to "the response of opportunistic microbes to changing environmental conditions".

The Betpak-Dala saiga population in central Kazakhstan, which saw the most deaths, increased from 31,000 after the epidemic to 36,000 by April 2016.

In late 2016, a large loss of the population happened in Mongolia. The etiology was confirmed to be goat plague in early 2017.

By 2023, according to the IUCN, massive increases in saiga populations have "resulted in full recovery" of the affected populations.

== Conservation ==
Under the auspices of the Convention on the Conservation of Migratory Species of Wild Animals, the Saiga Antelope Memorandum of Understanding was concluded and came into effect on 24 September 2006.

=== In captivity ===
Currently, only the Almaty Zoo and Askania-Nova keep saigas.
