= Khoit Tsenkher Cave Rock Art =

Cave and archaeological site in Mankhan, Khovd, Mongolia

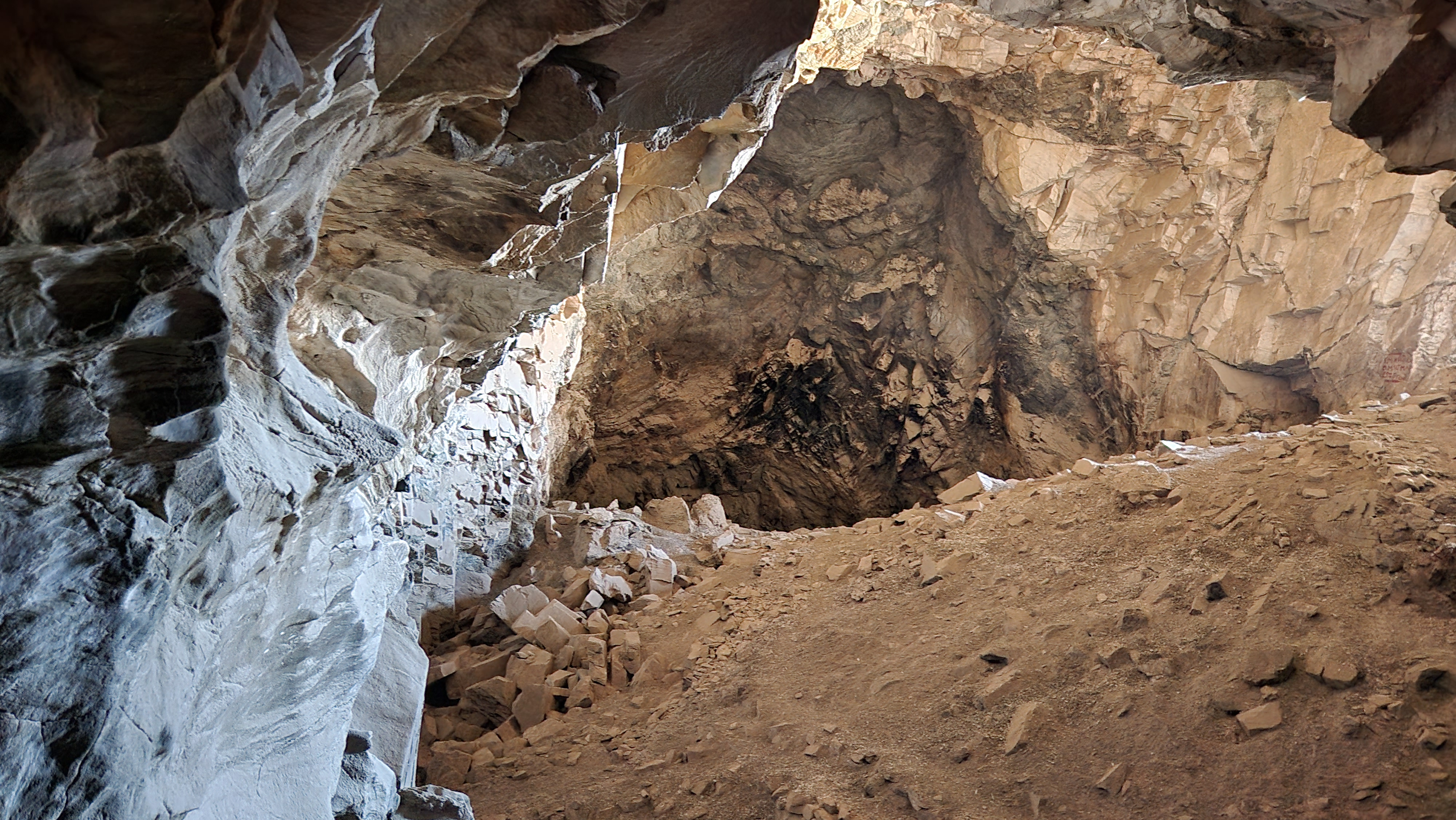
- Khoit Tsenkher Cave Rock Art site

- location in Mongolia
- 47°20′51″N 91°57′21″E
- Location: Mankhan District
- Region: Khovd, Mongolia

The Khoit Tsenkher Cave Rock Paintings (North Blue Cave Rock Paintings) are found in Mankhan Sum, Khovd Province, Mongolia.

== Site description ==
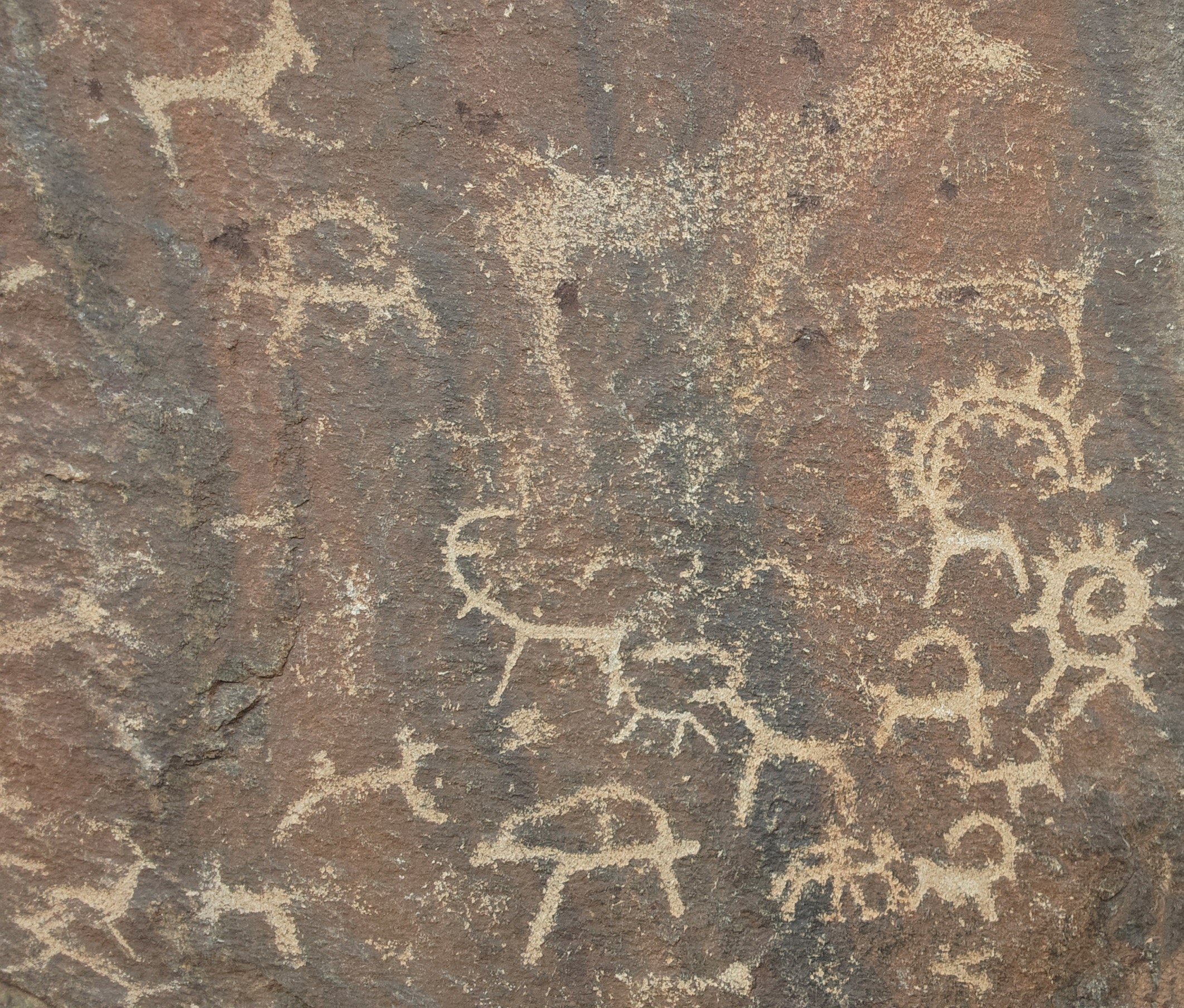
Rock art in surrounding areas of Khoit Tsenkher Cave

Originating in the Paleolithic period, the rock art found in Khoit Tsenkher Cave includes symbols and animal forms painted from the walls up to the ceiling. Stags, buffalo, oxen, ibex, lions, Argali sheep, antelopes, camels, elephants, ostriches, and other animal pictorials are present, often forming a palimpsest of overlapping images. The paintings appear brown or red in color, and are stylistically similar to other Paleolithic rock art from around the world but are unlike any other examples in Mongolia.

== World Heritage status ==
This site was added to the UNESCO World Heritage Tentative List on August 1, 1996 in the Cultural category.
