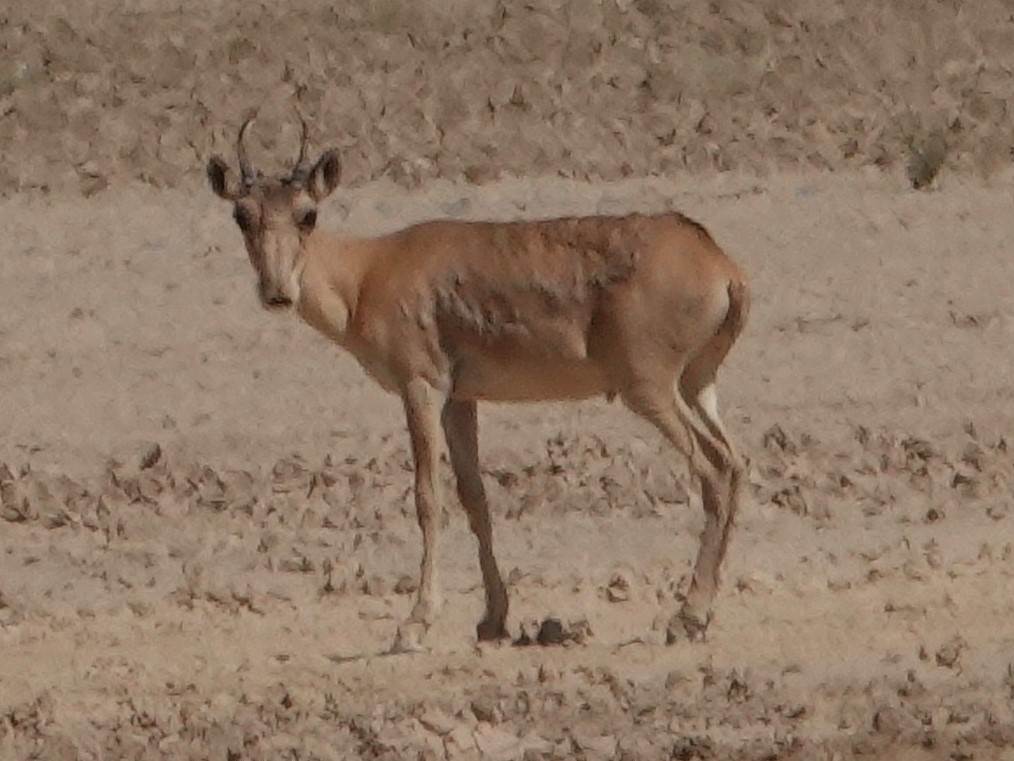

Conservation status
- Endangered (IUCN 3.1)

Scientific classification
- Kingdom: Animalia
- Phylum: Chordata
- Class: Mammalia
- Order: Artiodactyla
- Family: Bovidae
- Subfamily: Antilopinae
- Genus: Saiga
- Species: S. tatarica
- Subspecies: S. t. mongolica

Trinomial name
- Saiga tatarica mongolica Bannikov
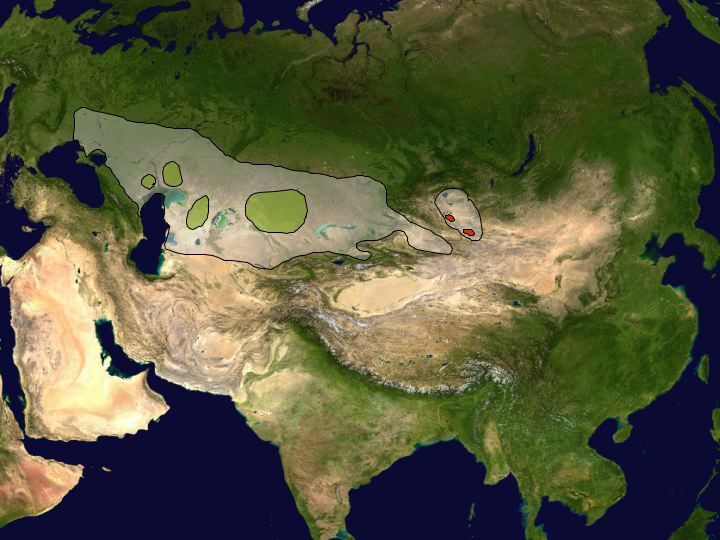
- Range of Mongolian saiga shown in red

= Mongolian saiga =

Subspecies of mammal

The Mongolian saiga (Saiga tatarica mongolica) is a subspecies of saiga antelope endemic to Mongolia's Great Lakes Basin desert steppe ecoregion. It was originally described as a full species, but later the initial author moved it to its current taxonomic position. It has also been considered a subspecies of Saiga borealis, but that has been shown to be incorrect.

The Mongolian saiga can develop a sandy colour. The coat develops a pale, grayish-brown colour in winter, with a hint of brown on the belly and the neck. The ventral parts are generally white. The hairs, can grow as long as 40–70 mm (1.6–2.8 in) in winter. This forms a 12 to 15 cm (4.7 to 5.9 in) long mane on the neck. Two distinct moults can be observed in a year, one in spring from April to May and another in autumn from late September or early October to early December.

The population of Mongolian saiga has steadily increased after a viral infection from livestock killed 60% of the population in Mongolia in 2017.
