= Mankhan, Khovd =

District in Khovd Province, Mongolia

Coordinates: 47°25′23″N 92°13′33″E

Mankhan District Манхан сум ᠮᠠᠩᠬᠠᠨᠰᠤᠮᠤ
- District
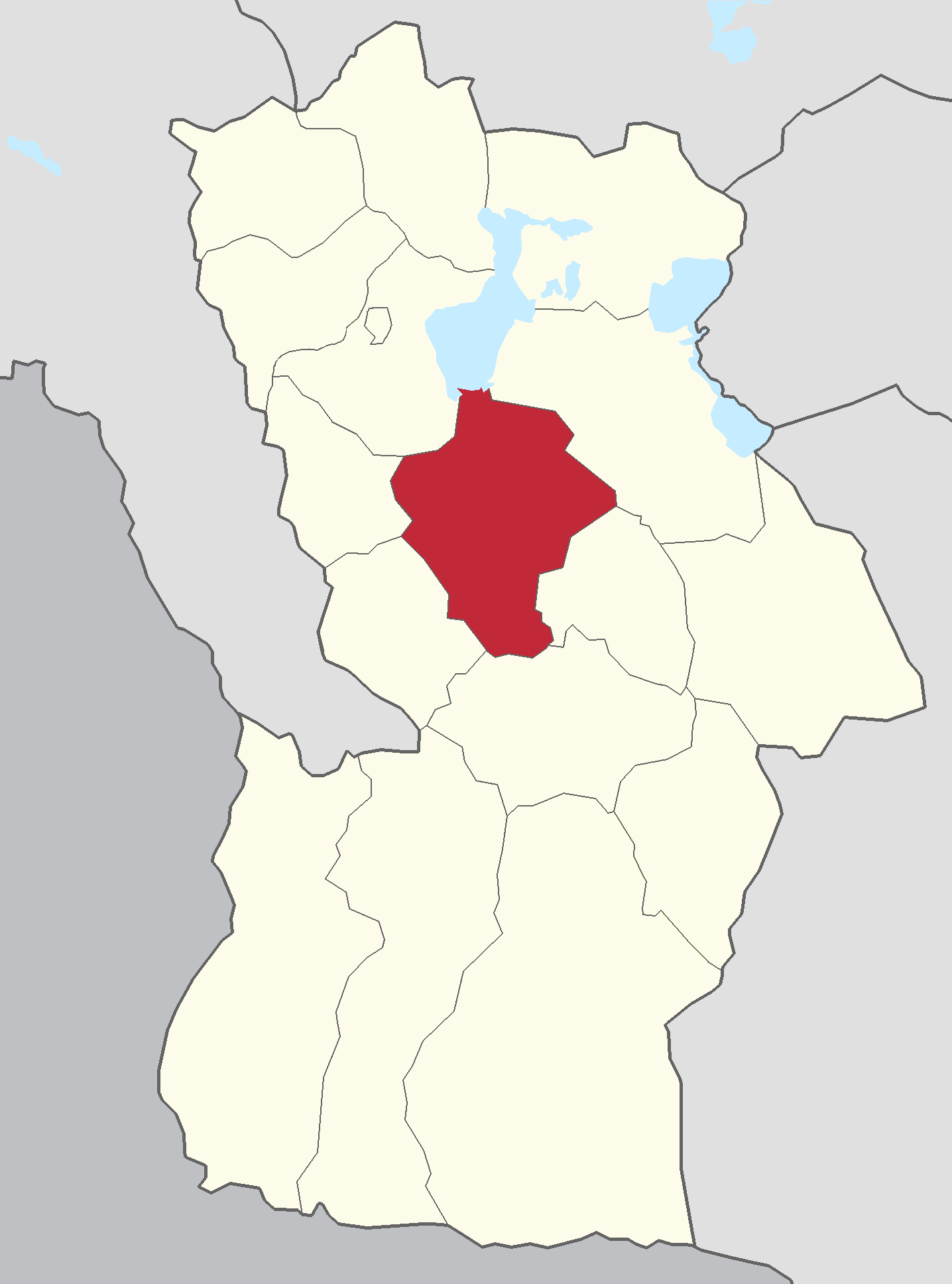
- Mankhan District in Khovd Province
- Country: Mongolia
- Province: Khovd Province

Area
  - Total: 4,330 km^{2} (1,670 sq mi)
- Time zone: UTC+7 (UTC + 7)

Mankhan (Mongolian: Манхан) is a sum (district) of Khovd Province in western Mongolia. It is 80 km away from the city of Khovd.

It is home to the Khoit Tsenkher Cave, a UNESCO World Heritage Site containing Paleolithic cave paintings. The localities of Ishgent Tolgoi, Khoit Uzuur and Khukh Khad are noted for their petroglyphs. Lower and Upper Paleolithic tools were unearthed in the sum in the mid 1980s.

== Geology ==
- Mankhan Nature Reserve

== Administrative divisions ==
The district is divided into six bags, which are:

- Bayangol
- Botgon
- Takhilt
- Tugrug Gol
- Ulaan Khuree
- Zereg Gol

== Notable people ==
- Damdiny Demberel, long-standing member and since 2008 speaker of the State Great Khural
