= Sharga Nature Reserve =

Nature reserve in Sharga, Govi-Altai, Mongolia

Coordinates: 46°00′00″N 94°30′00″E

Sharga Nature Reserve (Mongolian: Шарга) is a reserve in Sharga, Govi-Altai Province, Mongolia. It has a total area of 2.860 km^{2}. The reserve has been created in 1993 together with Mankhan Nature Reserve to protect the endangered Mongolian saiga.
