= Almaty Zoo =

Zoo in Kazakhstan

Алматы зообақ Almaty Zoo
- Interactive map of Алматы зообақ Almaty Zoo
- 43°15′50″N 76°58′32″E
- Date opened: 1936
- Location: Almaty, Kazakhstan
- Land area: 51.89 acres (21.00 ha)
- No. of animals: 4068
- No. of species: 509
- Memberships: EARAZA
- Website: www.almatyzoo.kz

Almaty Zoo (Kazakh: Алматы зообақ, romanized: Almatı zoobaq; Russian: Алматинский зоопарк, romanized: Almatinskiy zoopark) is the state zoo of Almaty, the most populous city in Kazakhstan. The Almaty Zoo is one of the largest and oldest zoological parks in the Republic of Kazakhstan.

Almaty zoo is a member of the Eurasian Regional Association of Zoos and Aquariums (EARAZA).

On December 8, 2020, a famous resident of the zoo, the polar bear Alkor, died. He had turned 31 years old just a day earlier. Over the previous 2 months, the health condition of the predator had been constantly deteriorating. Alkor was one of the old residents of the Almaty Zoo, he was brought here from Kaliningrad in 1990. Alcor has become the unofficial symbol of the zoo.

== History ==
In January 1935, the Council of People's Commissars of the Kazakh SSR made a decision on the immediate creation of a zoo in Alma-Ata. Murzakhan Tolebayev, an experienced hunter and expert in Semirechye, was engaged in choosing the place for building the first zoo in the republic.

Tolebaev chose the eastern outskirts of Gorky Park for the construction of the zoo. Tolebayev's opinion was supported by other members of the land commission and the management of the Government House. On February 19, by decision of the Almaty City Council, a land plot of 46 hectares, on the right bank of the Kazachka River, in an orchard, was allocated for construction. The allotted territory by its relief gave a full opportunity to make it for its intended purpose without great expense.

In 1936 Tolebayev was appointed as the head of the zoo, he supervised the construction of the zoo, and was engaged in selection of animals and organization of scientific base. To fill the zoo, Tolebayev personally caught some species of animals in the Kazakh steppes, including saigas, ibex, and gazelles. But these animals were very few.

In February 1937 Murzakhan Tolebayev published an article in the newspaper "Socialist Asia" about the opening of the zoo on June 1. But the opening was postponed to a later date. He later secured funds to purchase animals from the Moscow and Leningrad zoos and the Askania Nova Nature Reserve.

In September Tolebayev visited Moscow, where he negotiated with the Moscow zoo for the purchase of animals. Already in October 1937 bears, lion, rare hoofed animals and many other new zoo inhabitants arrived in Alma-Ata in special carriages. At the same time Murzakhan Tolebayev had time to negotiate with the People's Commissariat, personally ordered building materials, chose fodder and coordinated with architects. Just before the opening of the zoo a tiger, a crocodile and some exotic snakes arrived. In October the commission, headed by the Secretary of the Central Committee of the Communist Party of the Soviet Union Levon Mirzoyan, visited the building and was satisfied with the work done.

On November 7, 1937, the inauguration of the zoo took place. For the first two days the entrance to the zoo was free of charge. The opening of the zoo was attended by a delegation of members of the Politburo of the CPC Central Committee. Murzakhan Tolebayev was awarded with a diploma by the NKVD for the safe delivery of the animals from Moscow to Alma-Ata. Tolebayev combined his work in the zoo with the work in the Committee on Science. His plans in November 1937 included organization of apiary, insectarium and construction of aviary for elephants.

Many of Tolebayev's plans did not come to fruition. Two months after opening of the zoo, on December 5, 1937, Murzakhan Tolebayev was arrested by employees of NKVD. The unique documents on the first scientific works of the zoo, diaries of observations and plans of further building of the zoo were confiscated. In 1938 Murzakhan Tolebayev was shot on false charges.

== Zoo collection ==
As of 2005, there were 523 species, 3657 specimens in the zoo collection. Of these, mammals - 94 species, 317 specimens; birds - 224 species, 1056 specimens; reptiles - 80 species, 431 specimens; amphibians - 6 species, 39 specimens; fish - 114 species, 1736 specimens; invertebrates - 5 species, 78 specimens.

As of 2006, the zoo's collection included more than 400 species, about 5,000 specimens. Of these, 28 species are included in the Red Book of Kazakhstan and 71 species in the Red Book of IUCN, CIS.

The zoo exhibit at the beginning of 2014 is 4,768 specimens and 330 species of animals. These include: 75 mammal species, 67 fish species, 1 amphibian species, 57 reptile species, 127 bird species, and 3 invertebrate species.

As of 2015, there were 345 species, 5,428 specimens of which: 74 mammal species, 323 specimens; 124 bird species, 844 specimens; 56 reptile species, 195 specimens; 3 amphibian species, 37 specimens; 83 fish species, 4,029 specimens; invertebrates, 5 species.

== Dwellers ==
The inhabitants of the Almaty Zoo are housed in seven sections: predatory mammals, ungulates, primates, birds of prey, exotic birds, exotarium, and aquarium.

The "Sea Aquarium" pavilion is popular with visitors at the Almaty Zoo. It exhibits numerous representatives of aquatic fauna of our planet - fish, crustaceans, mollusks, and amphibians.

In the zoo terrarium there are 11 species of turtles: Caspian turtle, red-eared turtle, marsh turtle, steppe turtle, Seychelles turtle, red-legged turtle, marsh turtle and others. Reptiles include representatives of lizards and snakes suborder, among which tiger and reticulated pythons, water dragons, chameleons, rattlesnakes and Egyptian cobra are of particular interest for visitors.

There is a diverse display of waterfowl. Lakes and ponds are home to various species of swans, ducks, geese and cranes.

The largest of all non-flying birds living on Earth - emus and nandus live in spacious aviaries.

The collection of mammals is also diverse.

Elephants, giraffes, zebras, hippos, rhinoceroses, plains tapir, antelopes (gnu, nyala, kudu, oryx) attract attention from the paired and unpaired hoofed animals. Deer make up a special group. The largest among them are the Bukhara deer and red deer. There are also spotted deer, fallow deer and roe deer.

Wild goats and rams are widely represented: argali, Siberian ibex, markhorse goats, grizzly rams, urials, mouflons.

Especially widely represented in the Almaty Zoo are predatory animals of the feline family: lions, white lions, Persian and Far Eastern leopards, black panthers, jaguars, cougars, servals and lynxes.

There is also a subspecies of brown bear - the Tien Shan brown bear (white-headed).

The aviaries with monkeys are always crowded. There are monkeys and macaques, baboons and hamadryls. Of particular interest are the humanoid monkeys - chimpanzees, white and silver gibbons.

== Animal death ==
In 2016, it became known about the death of snow leopards listed in the Red Book, which had previously been donated by foreign zoos. A total of seven leopards died. Information about the death of the snow leopards until 2016 was carefully hidden from the public and was not made public. As explained by the administration of the Almaty Zoo leopards died because of improper maintenance, why they were kept so poorly, and why no one was punished for violations in the maintenance of animals, no answer was given. Overall, from 2005 to 2016, the number of animal species in the Almaty Zoo decreased by more than a third, from 523 species to 345.

Also in 2016 it became known about the death of especially valuable and rare species of animals, such as: Amur tigers, hippos, Kazakh mountain sheep (argali), bearded (a bird from the family of hawks), chimpanzees, Turkestan lynx and Bengal tiger.

In October 2016, a 2-year-old giraffe died. In December 2017 the lion "Khan", brought from France, died; the cause of death was a blood disease.

On December 8, 2020, the polar bear Alcor died. On December 7, he turned 31 years old. In the last two months the health of the predator was constantly deteriorating. Algor was one of the old residents of Almaty Zoo; he was brought here from Kaliningrad in 1990. Algor became an unofficial symbol of the zoo.

On May 4, 2024, the polar bear Tom From Prague zoo: “Today (on May 22, 2024) we received the news from Almaty that Tom died on May 4. Tom left here on March 28 and the transport went without any major problems, Tom left us fine, without the slightest clinical signs of anything,” Bobek said. From the zoo in Almaty, according to Bobka, the Prague garden received news of the polar bear for the last time on April 15, saying that it was fine.

== Zoo area ==
Area of the zoo until 1980 was 32 hectares, of which 13 hectares were occupied by aviaries and cages, 19 hectares - ponds for waterfowl. In 1980, a complete reconstruction of the zoo was carried out. Secretary of the Central Committee of the Communist Party of the Kazakh SSR Dinmukhamed Kunayev signed a project to build a new part of the zoo, which would greatly expand it. The project of expanding the zoo was developed by the institute "Almatagiprogor". By the decree of the Council of Ministers of the Kazakh SSR, the zoo was allocated an additional 27 hectares of land on a neighboring hillside, previously owned by the state farm "Mountain Giant", for the construction of the zoo. The territory of the zoo was to expand significantly beyond Ormanov Street. The Almaty zoo was to become one of the largest in the country. The territory was not developed by the city zoo for unknown reasons. In 2005, an area of 31.7723 hectares intended for expansion was sold for the construction of luxury housing.

As of 2005, the area of the zoo was 54 hectares (under the exposition - 27 hectares). In 2006, much of the zoo area was alienated for luxury construction and ended up being only 22 hectares and today is only 21 hectares.
