= Chinqai Balgasun =

Chinqai Balghasun (Mongolian: Činqai Balγasun; Cyrillic: Чинкай балгас), also known by its Chinese name Zhenhai Cheng (Chinese: 鎮海城; pinyin: Zhènhǎi Chéng), was a significant 13th-century fortress and agricultural settlement of the Mongol Empire. Located in western Mongolia, it served as a vital military and logistical hub during the reign of Genghis Khan and his successors.

The city's name "Balghasun" means "city" or "fortress" in Mongolian, and it was named after Chinqai (Zhenhai), a prominent official and minister who founded the city under the orders of Genghis Khan.

== History ==
=== Foundation and Genghis Khan Era ===
According to the History of Yuan (Yuan Shi), Genghis Khan ordered Chinqai to build the fortress in 1212. Although the Mongol Empire was then engaged in the conquest of the Jin dynasty, the location was strategically chosen to support future westward expansions.

The city functioned as a key supply depot during the Mongol conquest of Khwarezmia. It was part of a chain of logistics bases (including Karakorum and the Irtysh River) spaced approximately 500–600 km apart—roughly a month's march for the Mongol army—demonstrating Genghis Khan's advanced planning for long-distance campaigns.

The Taoist master Qiu Chuji (Changchun Zhenren) visited Chinqai Balghasun during his journey to meet Genghis Khan in Central Asia. His travelogue, The Travels of an Alchemist, describes the city as a bustling center where Chinese artisans, Han princesses of the former Jin dynasty, and Uyghur farmers lived together.

=== The Kaidu–Kublai war ===
The importance of Chinqai Balghasun shifted during the late 13th century during the Kaidu–Kublai war. As Kaidu challenged Kublai Khan's authority, the city became the primary military headquarters for the Yuan dynasty's defense of the Altai frontier.

Kublai's son Kököchü and later his great-grandson Khaishan (the future Emperor Wuzong) were stationed there as commanders-in-chief. It served as a base for the "Six Guard Armies" to repel Kaidu's incursions. Following the defeat and death of Kaidu in 1301, the city was used to manage the influx of surrendering soldiers and prisoners.

=== Decline ===
After the end of the Kaidu rebellion, the city's military significance waned. In 1309, it was formally organized as the Chinqai Pacification Commission (称海宣慰司) under the Lingbei province (Karakorum). However, by the mid-14th century, administrative offices were gradually abolished, and the city disappeared from historical records following the fall of the Yuan dynasty.

== Economy and Logistics ==
Chinqai Balghasun was renowned for its Tuntian (military agricultural colonies). Despite the arid climate of western Mongolia, Uyghur irrigation techniques were employed to cultivate wheat. The city functioned as a "granary" for the Mongol plateau, supplying food to the capital at Karakorum and the frontier armies. The presence of large-scale warehouses led some contemporary sources to refer to the site as Cangtou (Warehouse Head).

== Location and Archaeology ==
For centuries, the exact location of the city was a subject of scholarly debate. In the early 21st century, the Bichees Project (a joint Japanese-Mongolian archaeological mission) identified the Khalzan Shireg ruins in the Sharga district of Govi-Altai Province, Mongolia, as the site of Chinqai Balghasun.

Excavations revealed a square fortress (roughly 400m x 400m) with high earthen walls, consistent with the descriptions found in the Travels of an Alchemist and Yuan dynasty administrative records.

== See also ==
- Chinqai
- Karakorum

== Sources ==
- Ohba, Shoichi (1982). "On the Military Colony of Chenghai during the Mongol-Yuan Period". Shikan. 106. The Historical Society of Waseda University: 82–95.
- Shiraishi, Noriyuki (2002). Archaeological Study of the History of the Mongol Empire. Tokyo: Doseisha.
- Shiraishi, Noriyuki (2008). "On the Artifacts Excavated from the Sharga Site Cluster in Mongolia". Comprehensive Study of Urban Development and Transportation Networks in Mongolia through the Decipherment of Central Asian Language Materials (2005–2007 Grant-in-Aid for Scientific Research Report). Niigata University.
- Shiraishi, Noriyuki (2015). Genghis Khan and His Era. Tokyo: Bensei Shoin.
- Shiraishi, Noriyuki (2017). The Birth of the Mongol Empire: Excavating Genghis Khan's Capital. Tokyo: Kodansha. ISBN 9784062586528.
- Matsuda, Koichi (1982). "Qaishan's Military Expedition to Northwestern Mongolia". Tōhōgaku (Eastern Studies). 64. The Institute of Eastern Culture: 73–90.
- Muraoka, Hitoshi (2003). "Genghis Khan's Military Bases in Western Mongolia". Ryukoku Shidan (The Journal of Ryukoku History). 119・120. The Historical Society of Ryukoku University: 234–256.
- Muraoka, Hitoshi (2016). "Chinkai Balghas and the Altai Expeditionary Force of the Yuan Dynasty". Journal of 13th–14th Century Mongol History. 1: 113–128.
