= Saiga Conservation Alliance =

- Founded: Informally 1990s, Formally September 2006
- Type: Non-profit Organization
- Purpose: Saiga Conservation
- Location(s): Uzbekistan and United Kingdom
- Region served: Uzbekistan, Kazakhstan, Mongolia, Russia and Turkmenistan
- Key people: E.J. Milner-Gulland, (Trustee Chair); Elena Bykova, (Executive Secretary); David Mallon, (Trustee); Elisabeth Whitebread, (Trustee)
- Website: saiga-conservation.org

The Saiga Conservation Alliance SCA is a network of researchers and conservationists working to study and protect the critically endangered Saiga Antelope (Saiga tatarica) and their habitat. The Saiga are often seen as a major flagship species of the Central Asian and pre-Caspian steppes. In the last ten years, saiga populations have declined by 96%, which is the fastest decline ever recorded for a mammal species. Saiga Conservation Alliance is partnered with the Wildlife Conservation Network.

== History ==
In September 2006, the organization was formally founded.

In June 2015, E.J. Milner-Gulland said, 'Anti-poaching [needs to be a top priority for the Russian and Kazakh governments.'

== Programs ==
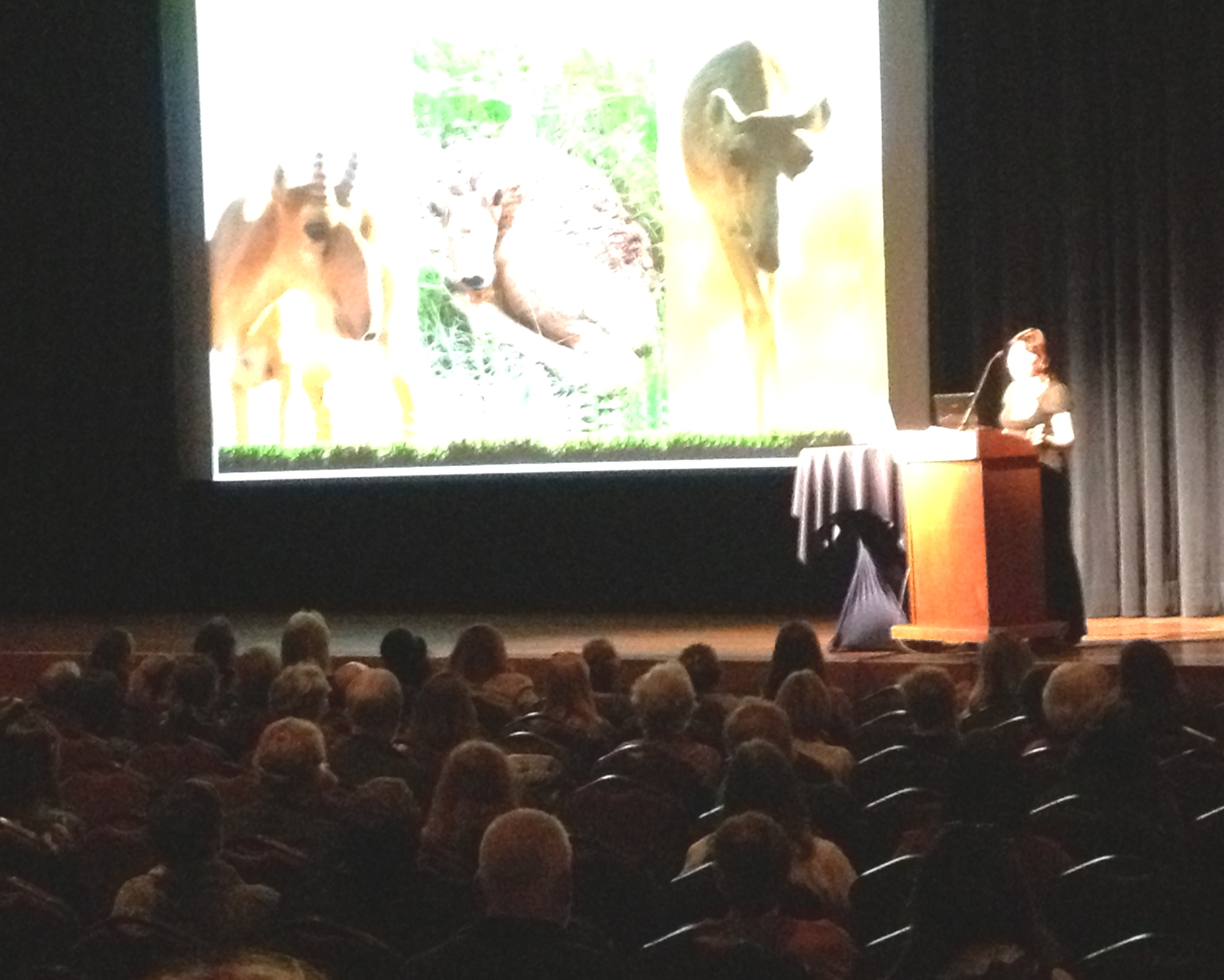
Elena Bykova, presenting the Saiga at the 2012 annual Wildlife Conservation Network Expo shown above.

=== CMS Project Monitoring ===
SCA was contracted by the United Nations Environment Programme's (UNEP) Convention on the Conservation of Migratory Species (CMS)to monitor progress of saiga conservation. Part of this project involves maintaining a database of saiga experts and conservationists as well as compiling data and disseminating it world-wide.

=== Russia ===
The Russian branch of SCA is the Centre for Wild Animals in Kalmykia. They are the world's only successful captive breeding program for saigas. Other programs include working with local villages and poor households which agree to help conserve saigas.

=== Kazakhstan ===
The Kazakhstan branch of SCA Monitors saiga populations to determine conservation efficacy. Surveys with locals monitors poaching activities and the reasons behind them.

=== Uzbekistan ===
The Uzbekistan branch conducts research into what the problems are of saiga conservation and negotiates plans for action between the government and local people.

=== Bulletin ===
A report about saiga conservation and news is published in six languages twice-yearly.

=== Small Grants Program ===
Annual small grants competition to help build grassroots saiga conservation projects.

=== Education ===
Every year SCA conservationists attend the Wildlife Conservation Network Expo to meet other conservationists and share methodology. They also hold presentations to educate and update the public and supporters.

== See also ==
- Wildlife Conservation Network
- Conservation movement
- Environmental movement
- Natural environment
- Sustainability
