= Loxodonta adaurora =

Loxodonta adaurora Temporal range: Pliocene

Scientific classification
- Domain: Eukaryota
- Kingdom: Animalia
- Phylum: Chordata
- Class: Mammalia
- Order: Proboscidea
- Family: Elephantidae
- Genus: Loxodonta
- Species: †L. adaurora

Binomial name
- †Loxodonta adaurora Maglio, 1970

Extinct species of mammal

Loxodonta adaurora is an extinct species of elephant in the genus Loxodonta, that of the African elephants. Fossils of Loxodonta adaurora have only been found in Africa, where they developed in the Pliocene. L. adaurora was presumed to be the genetic antecedent of the two modern African elephant species; however, an analysis in 2009 suggested that L. africana evolved from L. atlantica. The same study concluded that Loxodonta adaurora was morphologically indistinguishable from Mammuthus subplanifrons and that these constituted the same species probably within the mammoth lineage. However, other authors have continued to consider L. adaurora a valid species of Loxodonta, with some considering it an early morph of Loxodonta exoptata.
