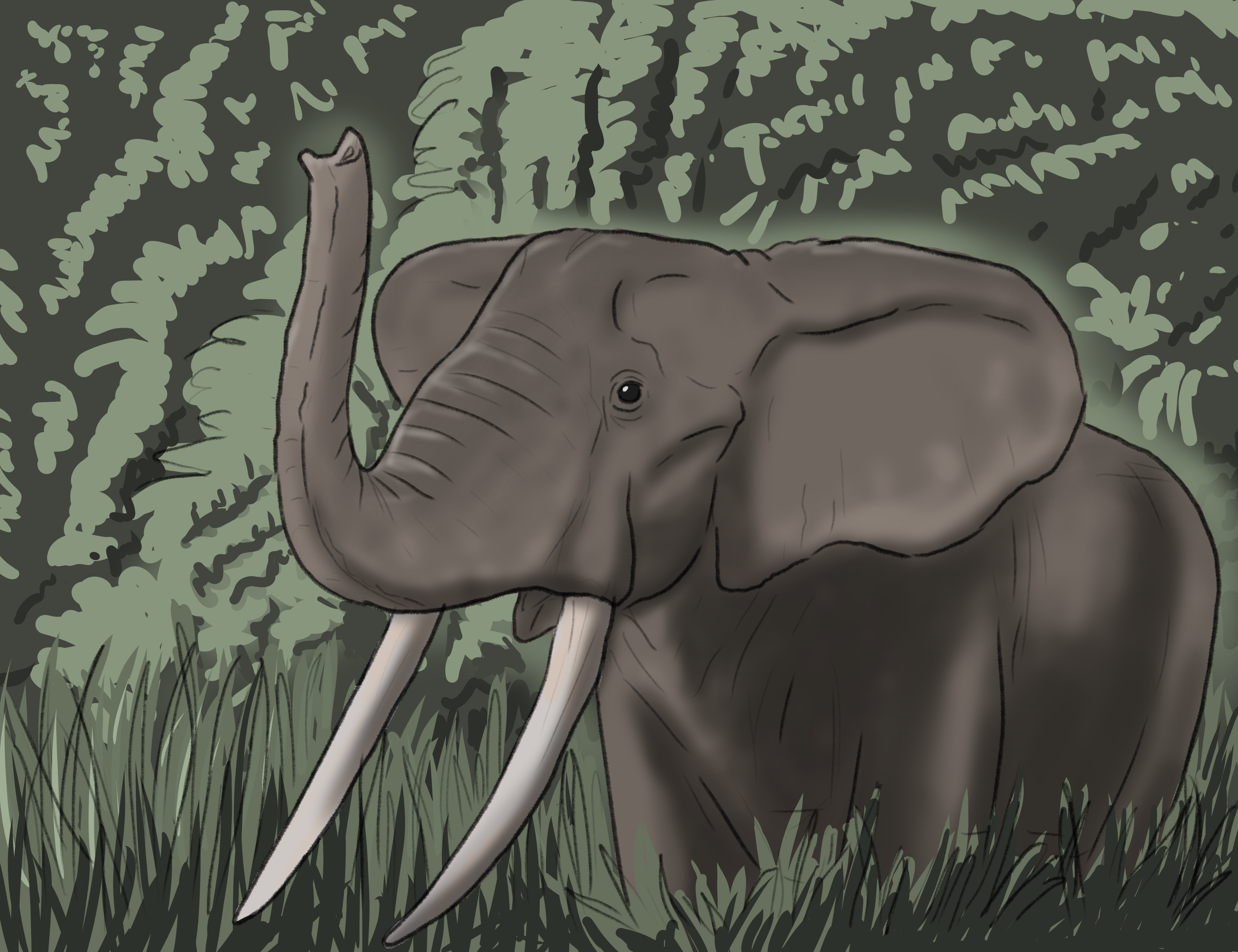
- Reconstruction of Loxodonta cookei

Scientific classification
- Kingdom: Animalia
- Phylum: Chordata
- Class: Mammalia
- Order: Proboscidea
- Family: Elephantidae
- Genus: Loxodonta
- Species: †L. cookei

Binomial name
- †Loxodonta cookei Sanders, 2007

= Loxodonta cookei =

Loxodonta cookei Temporal range: Late Miocene - Early Pliocene

Extinct species of elephant

Loxodonta cookei is an extinct species of African elephant. The specific epithet is dedicated to H. Basil S. Cooke, a paleontologist who specialized in extinct African mammals. Its fossils have been found in Uganda, Tanzania and South Africa. Most of the fossils found from this species were teeth.

== Palaeobiology ==
=== Palaeoecology ===
L. cookei exhibits noticeably more hypsodont dentition than earlier elephantids, which likely reflects an increased prevalence of abrasive dust in the environment relative to previous African palaeoenvironments.
