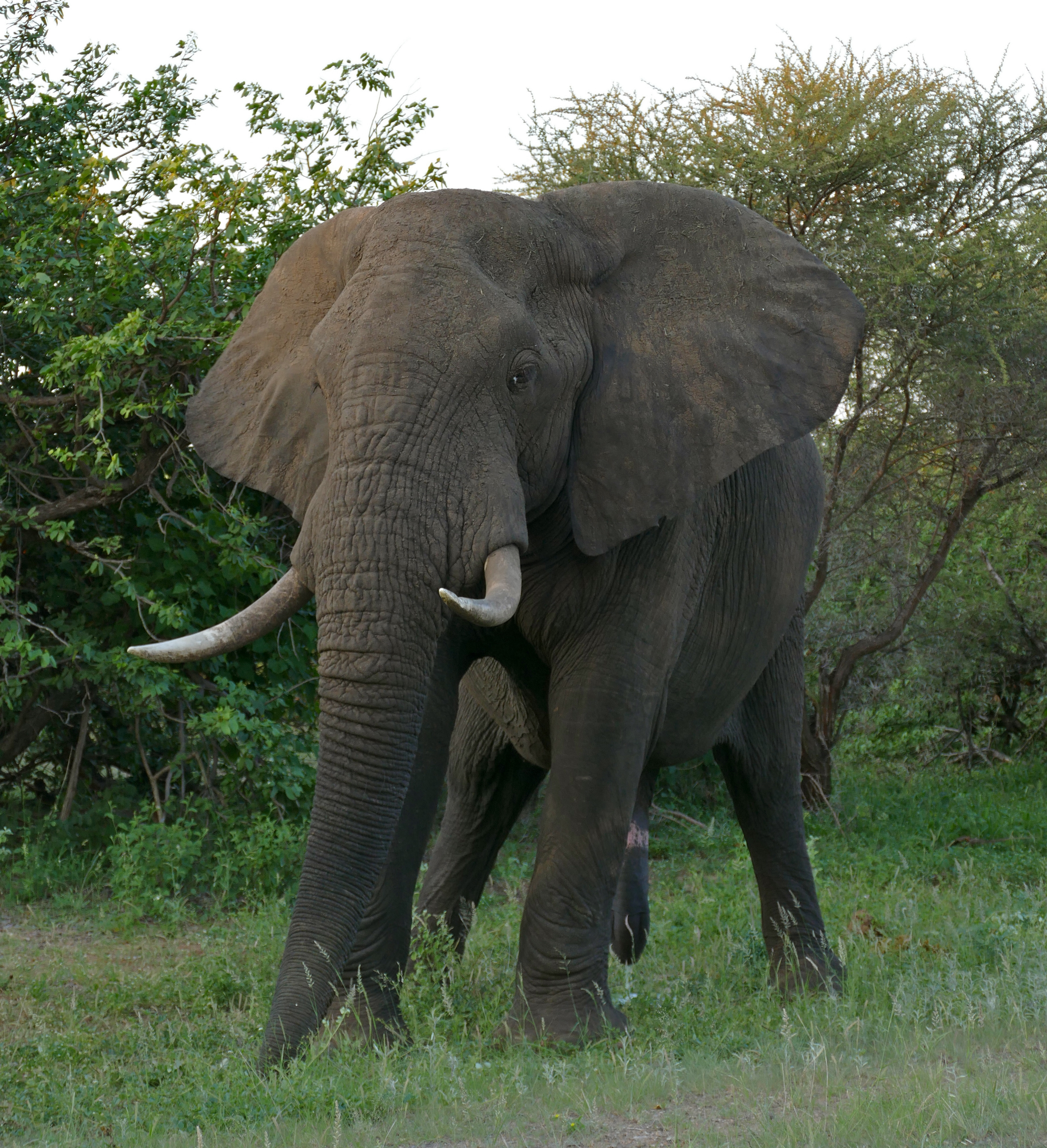
- African bush elephant bull in Kruger National Park
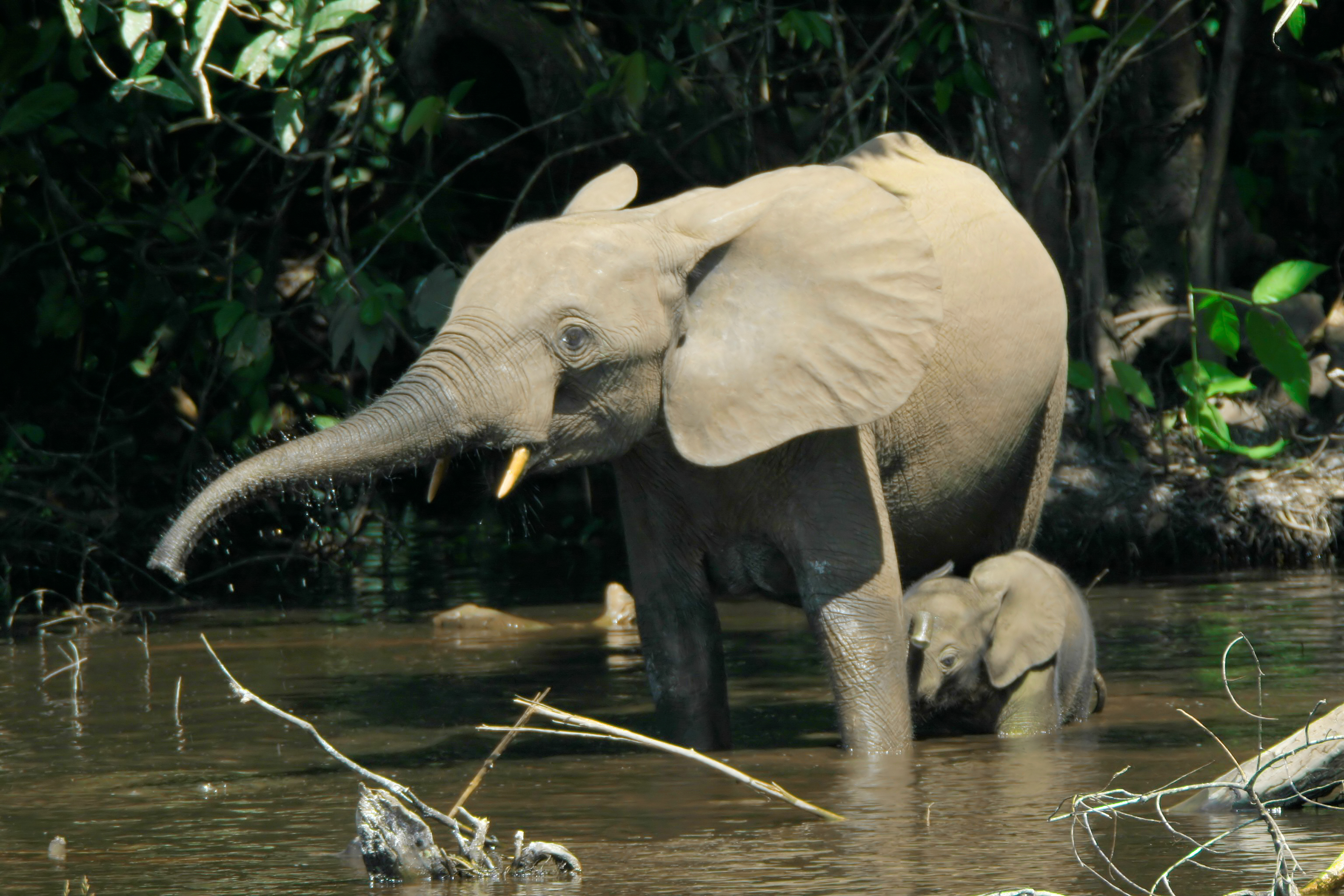
- Adult African forest elephant with calf in Nouabalé-Ndoki National Park

Scientific classification
- Kingdom: Animalia
- Phylum: Chordata
- Class: Mammalia
- Order: Proboscidea
- Family: Elephantidae
- Tribe: Loxodontini
- Genus: Loxodonta; Anonymous, 1827

Type species
- Elephas africana Blumenbach, 1797

Species and subspecies
- L. africana; L. cyclotis; †L. adaurora; †L. a. adaurora †L. a. kararae: †L. atlantica; †L. a. angammensis †L. a. atlantica: †L. exoptata; †L. cookei
- Range of living Loxodonta (2007)

= African elephant =

African elephants Temporal range: Late Miocene – Present, 7–0 Ma

Genus comprising two living elephant species

African elephants are members of the genus Loxodonta comprising two living elephant species, the African bush elephant (L. africana) and the smaller African forest elephant (L. cyclotis). Both are social herbivores with grey skin. However, they differ in the size and colour of their tusks as well as the shape and size of their ears and skulls.

Both species are at risk of extinction according to the IUCN Red List; as of 2021, the bush elephant is considered endangered while the forest elephant is considered critically endangered. They are threatened by habitat loss and fragmentation, along with poaching for the illegal ivory trade in several range countries.

Loxodonta is one of two extant genera in the family Elephantidae. The name refers to the lozenge-shaped enamel of their molar teeth. Fossil remains of Loxodonta species have been found in Africa, spanning from the Late Miocene (from around 7–6 million years ago) onwards.

== Etymology ==
The name Loxodonta comes from the Ancient Greek words λοξός (loxós, "slanting", "crosswise") and ὀδούς (odoús, "tooth"), referring to the lozenge-shaped enamel of the molar teeth, which differs significantly from the rounded shape of the Asian elephant's molar enamel.

== Taxonomy and evolution ==
The first scientific description of the African elephant was written in 1797 by Johann Friedrich Blumenbach, who proposed the scientific name Elephas africanus. Loxodonte was proposed as a generic name for the African elephant by Frédéric Cuvier in 1825. An anonymous author used the Latinized spelling Loxodonta in 1827. This author was recognized as authority by the International Code of Zoological Nomenclature in 1999.

Elephas (Loxodonta) cyclotis was proposed by Paul Matschie in 1900, who described three African elephant zoological specimens from Cameroon whose skulls differed in shape from those of elephant skulls collected elsewhere in Africa. In 1936, Glover Morrill Allen considered this elephant to be a distinct species and called it the 'forest elephant'; later authors considered it to be a subspecies. Morphological and genetic analyses have since provided evidence for species-level differences between the African bush elephant and the African forest elephant.

In 1907, Richard Lydekker proposed six African elephant subspecies based on the different sizes and shapes of their ears. They are all considered synonymous with the African bush elephant.

A third species, the West African elephant, has also been proposed but needs confirmation. It is thought that this lineage has been isolated from the others for 2.4 million years.

=== Extinct species and subspecies ===
Between the late 18th and 21st centuries, the following extinct African elephants were described on the basis of fossil remains:

- North African elephant († Loxodonta africana pharaohensis) proposed by Paulus Edward Pieris Deraniyagala in 1948 was a specimen from Fayum in Egypt.
- † Loxodonta atlantica was proposed as Elephas atlanticus by Auguste Pomel in 1879 based on a skull and bones found in Ternifine, Algeria.
- † Loxodonta exoptata proposed by Wilhelm Otto Dietrich in 1941 was based on teeth found in Laetoli, Tanzania.
- † Loxodonta adaurora proposed by Vincent Maglio in 1970 was a complete skeleton found in Kanapoi, Kenya.
- † Loxodonta cookei proposed by William J. Sanders in 2007 based on teeth found in the Varswater Formation at Langebaanweg, South Africa.

=== Phylogeny and evolution ===
Relationships of living and extinct elephants based on DNA, after Palkopoulou et al. 2018.

- Elephantidae
  - - Loxodonta (African elephants)
    - †Palaeoloxodon (straight-tusked elephants)
  - - Elephas (Asian elephants)
    - †Mammuthus (mammoths)

The oldest species of Loxodonta known is Loxodonta cookei, with remains of the species known from around 7–5 million years ago, from remains found in Chad, Kenya, Uganda, and South Africa.

Analysis of nuclear DNA sequences indicates that the genetic divergence between African bush and forest elephants dates 2.6 – 5.6 million years ago. The African forest elephant was found to have a high degree of genetic diversity, likely reflecting periodic fragmentation of their habitat during the changes in the Pleistocene.

Gene flow between the two African elephant species was examined at 21 locations. The analysis revealed that several African bush elephants carried mitochondrial DNA of African forest elephants, indicating they hybridised in the savanna-forest transition zone in ancient times. However, despite the hybridisation at the contact zone between the two species, there appears to have been little effective gene flow between the two species since their initial split.

Phylogeny showing the placement of straight-tusked elephant (Palaeoloxodon antiquus) in relation to other elephantids based on nuclear genomes, after Palkopoulou et al. 2018, showing hybridization-facilitated introgressive gene flow from forest elephants into Palaeoloxodon.

DNA from the European straight-tusked elephant (Palaeoloxodon antiquus) indicates that the extinct elephant genus Palaeoloxodon is more closely related to African elephants than to Asian elephants or mammoths. Analysis of the genome of P. antiquus also shows that Palaeloxodon extensively hybridised with African forest elephants, resuling in introgressive gene flow from African elephants into Palaeoloxodon, with the mitochondrial genome and over 30% of the nuclear genome of P. antiquus deriving from L. cyclotis. This ancestry is closer to modern west African populations than to central African populations of forest elephants. Analysis of Chinese Palaeoloxodon mitogenomes suggests that this forest elephant ancestry was widely shared among Palaeoloxodon species.

== Description ==
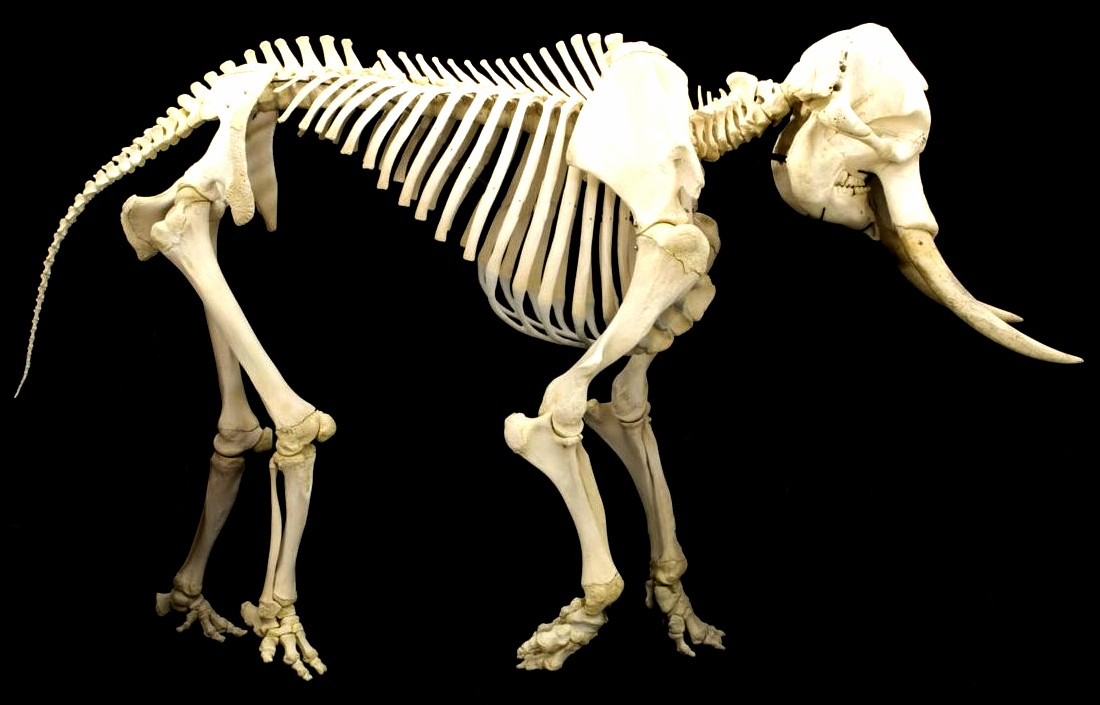
An African bush elephant skeleton

=== Skin, ears, and trunk ===
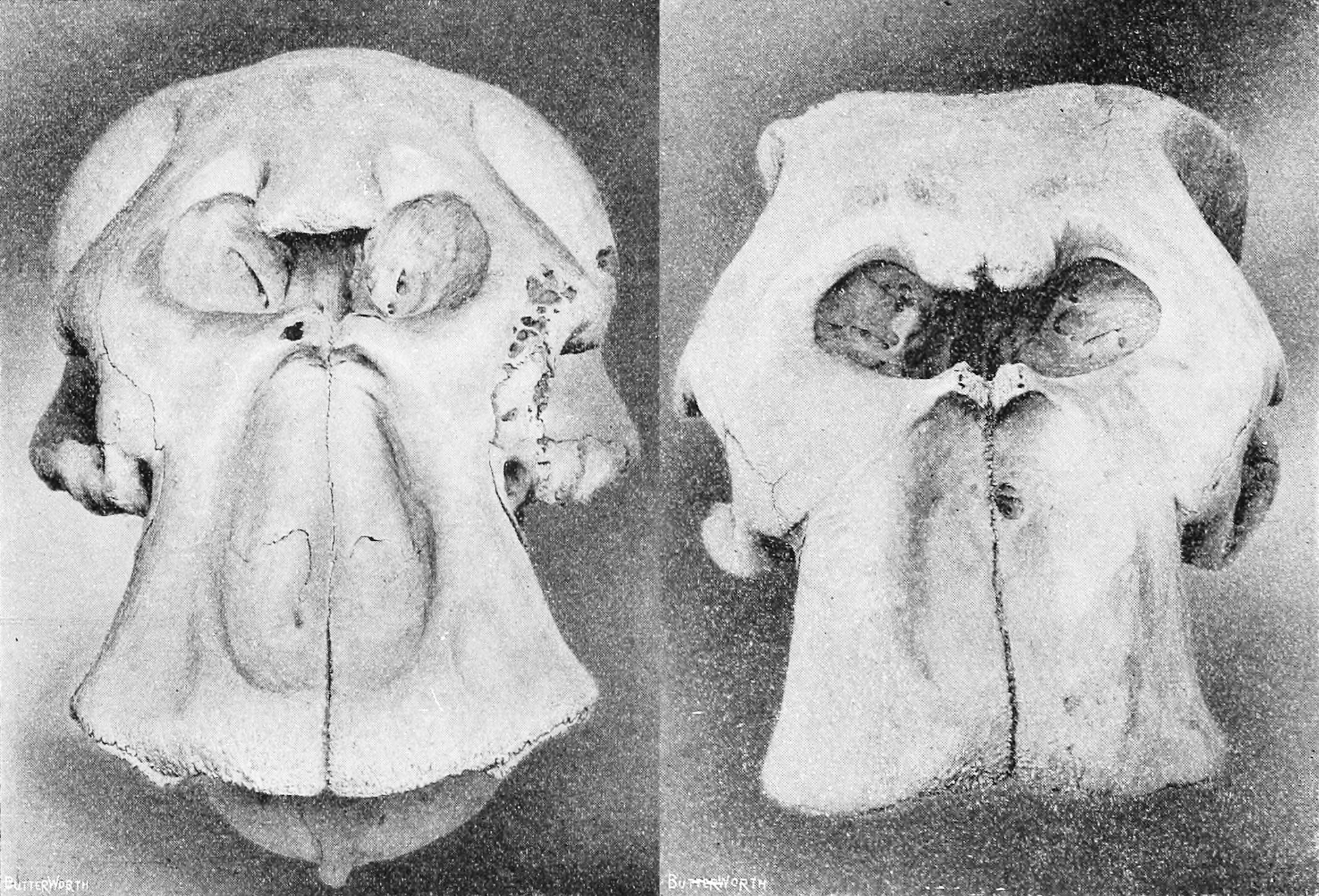
Comparison of bush (left) and forest (right) elephant skulls in frontal view. Note the shorter and wider head of L. cyclotis, with a concave instead of convex forehead.

African elephants have grey folded skin up to 30 mm (1.2 in) thick that is covered with sparse, bristled dark-brown to black hair. Short tactile hair grows on the trunk, which has two finger-like processes at the tip, whereas Asian elephants have one. Their large ears help to reduce body heat. Flapping them creates air currents and exposes the ears' inner sides where large blood vessels increase heat loss during hot weather. The trunk is a prehensile elongation of its upper lip and nose. This highly sensitive organ is innervated primarily by the trigeminal nerve, and is thought to be manipulated by about 40,000–60,000 muscles. Because of this muscular structure, the trunk is so strong that elephants can use it to lift about 3% of their own body weight. They use it for smelling, touching, feeding, drinking, dusting, producing sounds, loading, defending and attacking. Elephants sometimes swim underwater and use their trunks as snorkels.

=== Tusks and molars ===
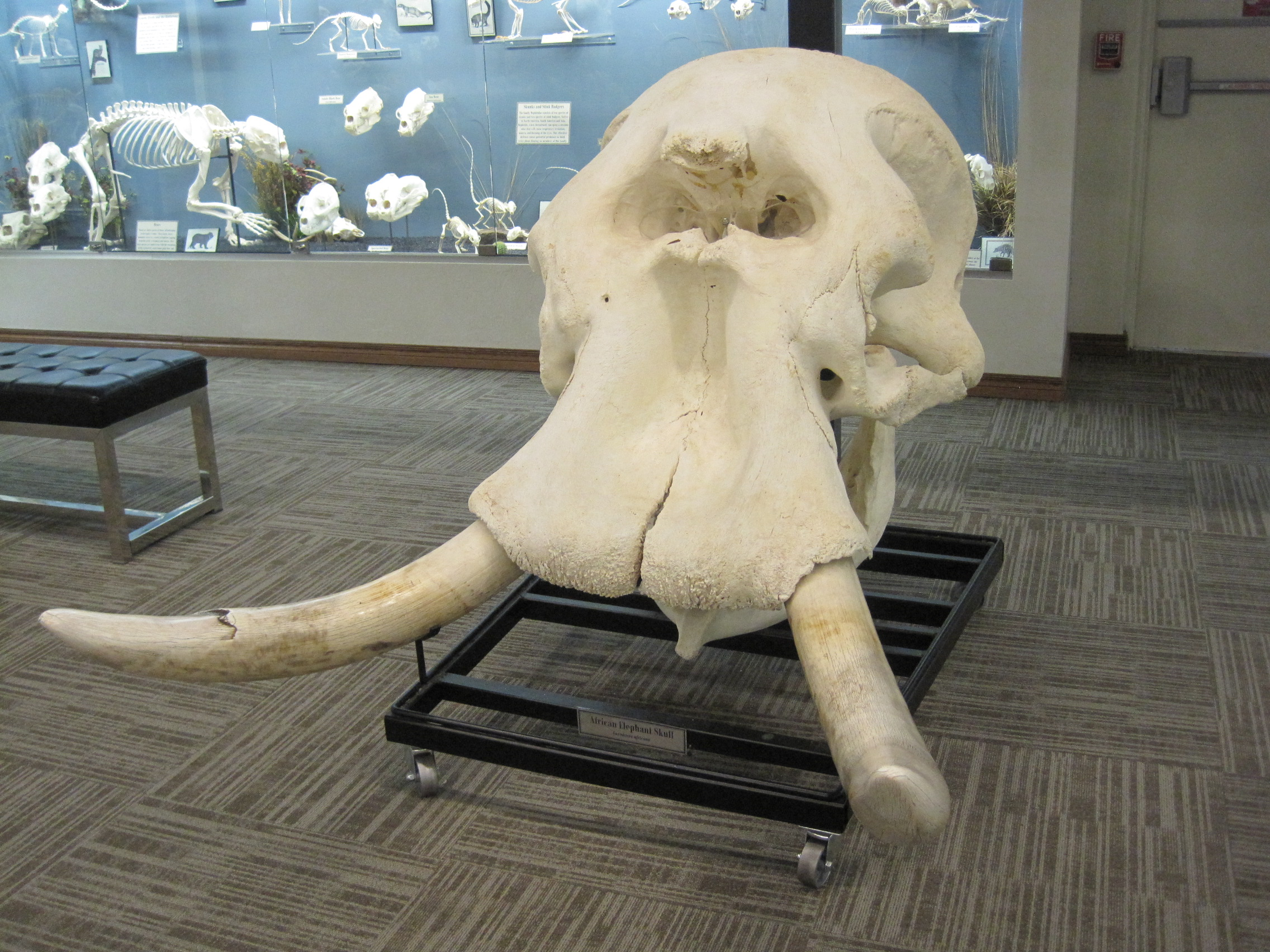
A male African bush elephant skull on display at the Museum of Osteology

Both male and female African elephants have tusks that grow from deciduous teeth called tushes, which are replaced by tusks when calves are about one year old. Tusks are composed of dentin, which forms small diamond-shaped structures in the tusk's center that become larger at its periphery. Tusks are primarily used to dig for roots and strip the bark from trees for food, for fighting each other during the mating season, and for defending themselves against predators. The tusks weigh from 23 to 45 kg (51–99 lb) and can be from 1.5 to 2.4 m (5–8 ft) long. They are curved forward and continue to grow throughout the elephant's lifetime.

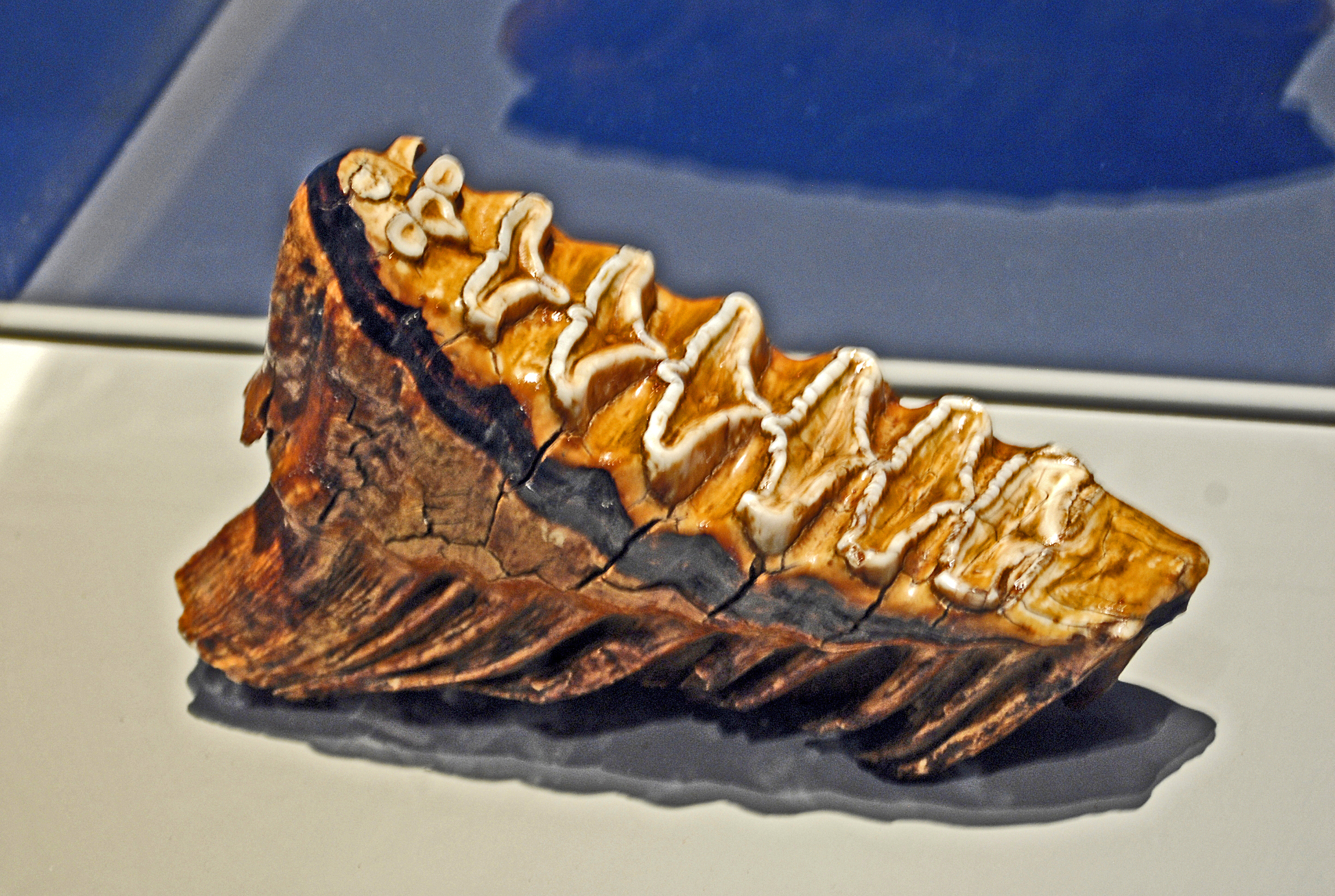
Molar tooth of an African bush elephant, showing loxodont/lozenge shaped sinuses/enamel ridges

Diagram of the upper surface of an African elephant molar

The dental formula of elephants is 1.0.3.30.0.3.3 × 2 = 26. Elephants have four molars; each weighs about 5 kg (11 lb) and measures about 30 cm (12 in) long. As the front pair wears down and drops out in pieces, the back pair moves forward, and two new molars emerge in the back of the mouth. Elephants replace their teeth four to six times in their lifetimes. At around 40 to 60 years of age, the elephant loses the last of its molars and will likely die of starvation which is a common cause of death. African elephants have 24 teeth in total, six on each quadrant of the jaw. The enamel plates of the molars are fewer in number than in Asian elephants. The enamel of the molar teeth wears into a distinctive lozenge/loxodont (<>) shape characteristic to all members of the genus Loxodonta. While some extinct species of Loxodonta retained permanent premolar teeth, these have been lost in both living species.

=== Size ===
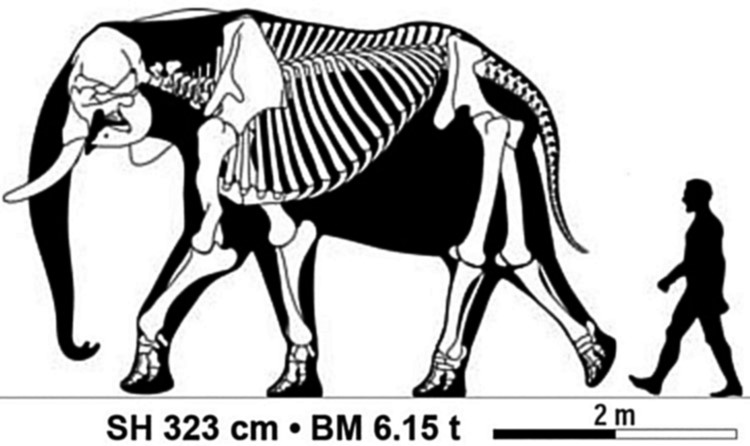
Skeleton of Jumbo, a young African bush elephant bull, compared to a human

The African bush elephant is the largest terrestrial animal. Under optimal conditions where individuals are capable of reaching full growth potential, mature fully grown females are 2.47–2.73 m (8 ft 1 in – 8 ft 11 in) tall at the shoulder and weigh 2.6–3.5 t (2.6–3.4 long tons; 2.9–3.9 short tons), while mature fully grown bulls are 3.04–3.36 m (10.0–11.0 ft) tall and weigh 5.2–6.9 t (5.1–6.8 long tons; 5.7–7.6 short tons) on average. The largest recorded bull stood 3.96 m (13.0 ft) at the shoulder and is estimated to have weighed 10.4 t (10.2 long tons; 11.5 short tons). Its back is concave-shaped, while the back of the African forest elephant is nearly straight. The African forest elephant is considerably smaller. Fully grown African forest elephant males in optimal conditions where individuals are capable of reaching full growth potential are estimated to be on average 2.09–2.31 m (6.9–7.6 ft) tall and 1.7–2.3 t (1.7–2.3 long tons; 1.9–2.5 short tons) in weight.

== Distribution and habitat ==
African elephants

African elephants are distributed in Sub-Saharan Africa, where they inhabit Sahelian scrubland and arid regions, tropical rainforests, mopane and miombo woodlands. African forest elephant populations occur only in Central and West Africa.

== Behavior and ecology ==
=== Family ===
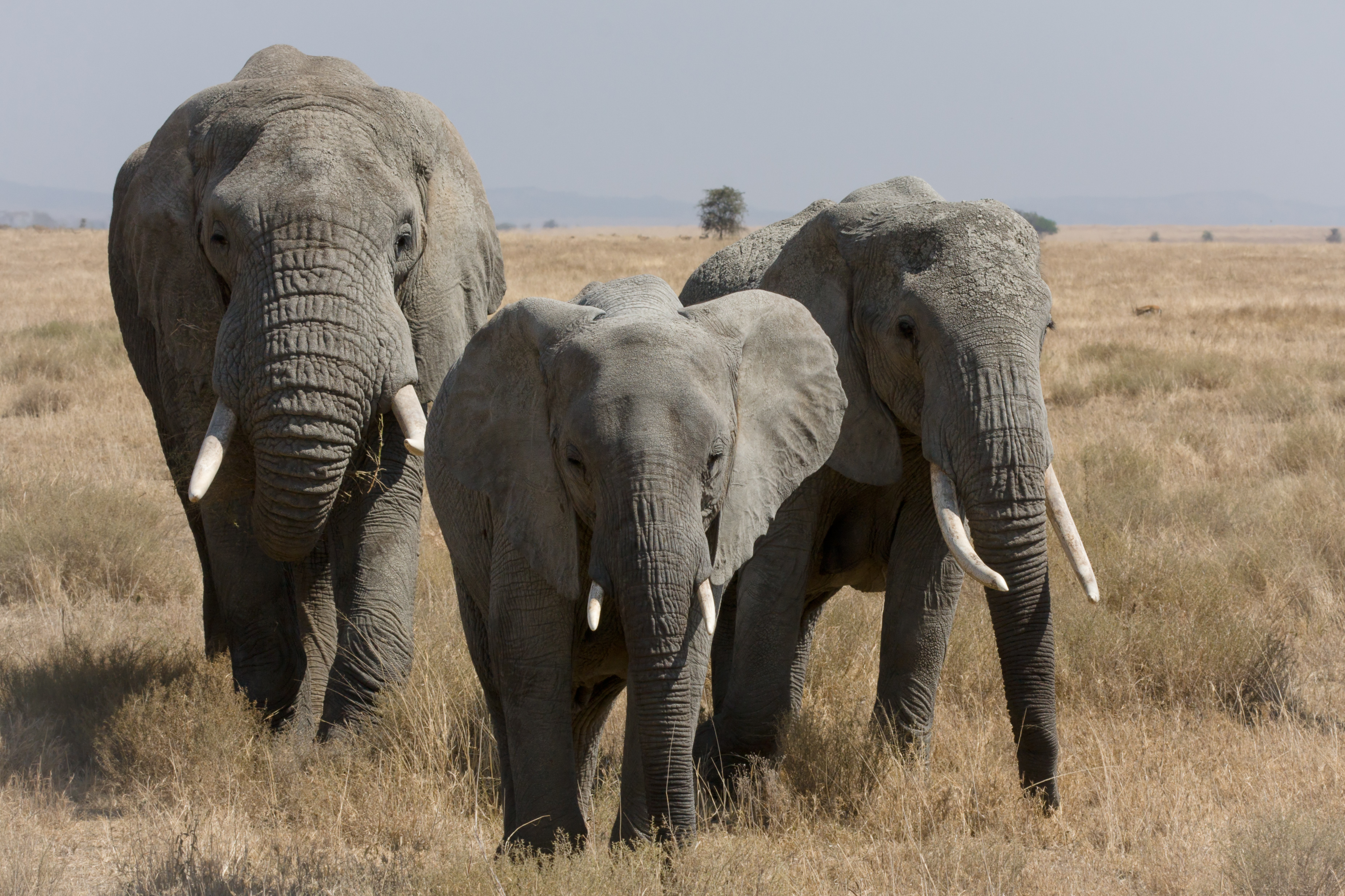
Female bush elephants in Tanzania

Family responds to bee warning rumble

Both African elephant species live in family units comprising several adult cows, their daughters and their subadult sons. Each family unit is led by an older cow known as the matriarch. African forest elephant groups are less cohesive than African bush elephant groups, probably due to the lack of natural predators.

When separate family units bond, they form kinship or bond groups. After puberty, male elephants tend to form close alliances with other males. While females are the most active members of African elephant groups, both male and female elephants are capable of distinguishing between hundreds of different low-frequency infrasonic calls to communicate with and identify each other.

Elephants use some vocalisations that are beyond the hearing range of humans, to communicate across large distances. Elephant mating rituals include the gentle entwining of trunks.

Bulls were believed to be solitary animals, becoming independent once reaching maturity. New research suggests that bulls maintain ecological knowledge for the herd, facilitating survival when searching for food and water, which also benefits the young bulls who associate with them. Bulls only return to the herd to breed or to socialize; they do not provide parental care to their offspring or raise them, but rather play a fatherly role in general to younger bulls to show dominance.

=== Territorial behavior and space use ===
African elephants are not strictly territorial but they display various types of patterns of space use which are influenced by social structure, seasonal and climate variation, and resource availability. Herds usually live in home ranges that vary from several hundred to several thousand square kilometers depending on the resource availability and habitat conditions; herds follow migratory routes and movement patters which connects protected areas and other suitable habitats that play an important role on maintaining population connectivity and access to critical resources such as vegetation and water. Additional factors such as social dominance and environmental factors like rainfall and vegetation productivity also influences spatial segregation among groups within the same region.

==== Aggression, fighting, and dominance ====
African elephants displays complex patterns of aggression accompanied with dominance, especially within adult males. Musth is a term which refers to physiological state where male African elephants exhibit massive surges of testosterone, heightened sexual activity, and increased aggression and is observed during male - male competition. During the period where male African elephant undergo musth, they display characteristic behavior which includes temporal gland secretion, urine dribbling, and certain postures which explains their condition to other individuals. By performing these behaviors, male African elephants reduces the need for physical confrontation by communicating dominance status. However, in cases where these types of communication fail, aggressive encounters including tusking and pushing may occur when competing for receptive females. The dominance hierarchy within a herd of elephants are largely influenced and based on age, size, and musth status with older males typically outcompeting younger or non-musth individuals.

=== Feeding ecology and diet ===
African elephants are generalist herbivores and consume a wide variety of leaves, grasses, bark, and fruits, but woody vegetation in dry seasons. While feeding, they pluck leaves and tear at branches using tusks, which can cause enormous damage to foliage. Fermentation of the food takes place in the hindgut, enabling large food intakes. The large size and hindgut of the African elephant also allows for the digestion of various plant parts, including fibrous stems, bark and roots.

African elephants aid in germination of seeds thanks to their large stomachs; as they are able to cover a large area within one day, they spread seeds from different trees rapidly. The elephants graze on the trees and consume seeds from them, and then, with the seed passing through the gastrointestinal tract and then secreted out, the seeds are fertilized and ready to grow. The germination via elephants prevents plant competition and removes the requirement for some seeds to be wind-blown to grow, or the process of random germination. The diversity of plants and trees that can grow through this process also increases because the dung piles can contain upwards of 10 different tree species, with some containing traces of 50 trees and above.

=== Intelligence ===
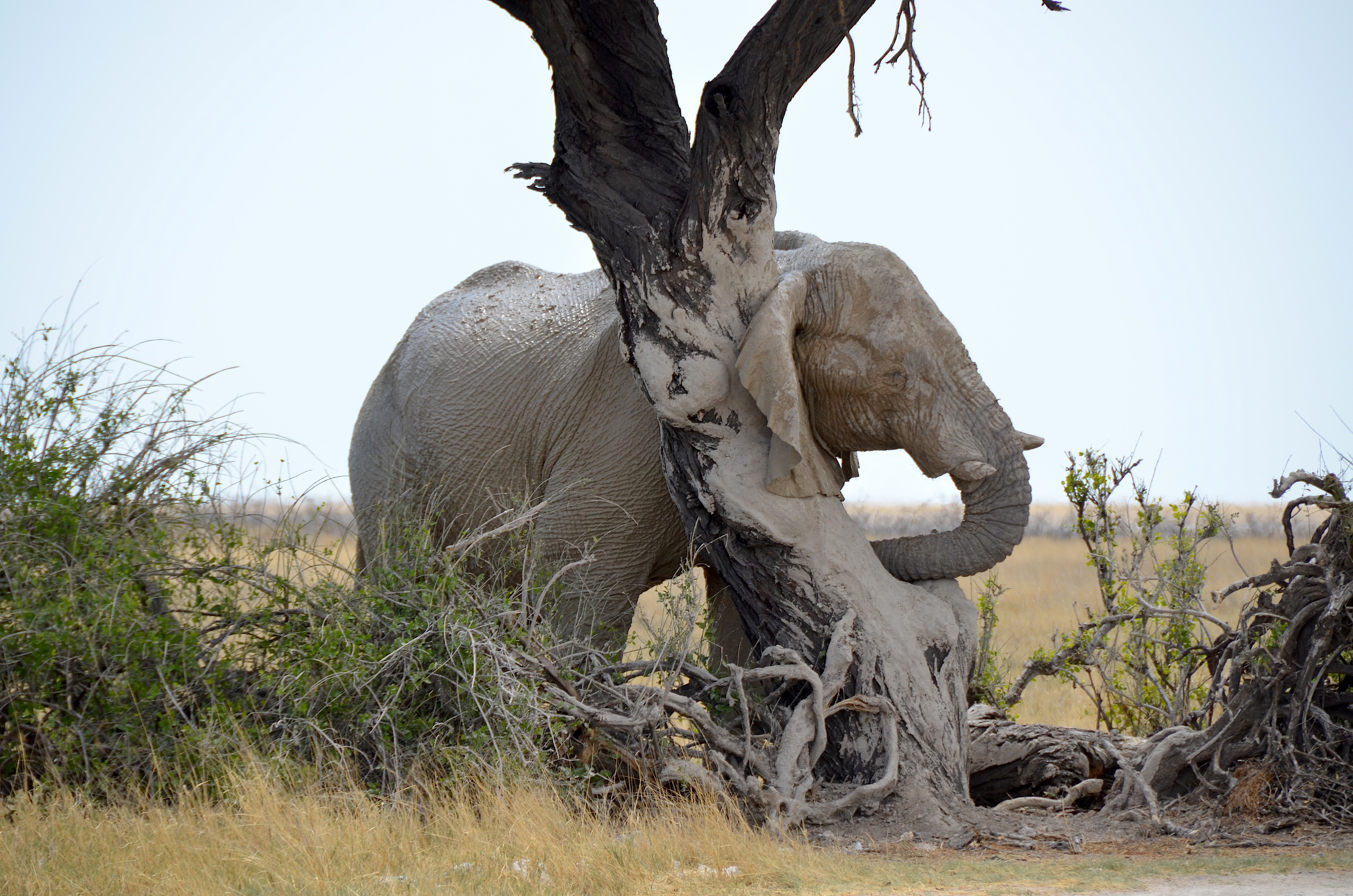
Scratching on a tree helps to remove layers of dead skin and parasites

African elephants are highly intelligent. They have a very large and highly convoluted neocortex, a trait they share with humans and other apes, as well as some dolphin species. They are among the world's most intelligent species. With a mass of just over 5 kg (11 lb), the elephant brain is larger than that of any other terrestrial animal. The elephant's brain is similar to a human brain in terms of structure and complexity; the elephant's cortex has as many neurons as that of a human brain, suggesting convergent evolution.

Elephants exhibit a wide variety of behaviours, including those associated with grief, learning, mimicry, art, play, a sense of humor, altruism, use of tools, compassion, cooperation, self-awareness, memory and possibly language. All of these behaviors point to a highly intelligent species that is thought to be equal to cetaceans and primates.

The African elephant's cognitive complexity includes behaviors indicative of empathy, problem-solving, and cooperative group behaviors. These traits underscore the evolutionary convergence of intelligence across species, similar to that seen in primates and cetaceans.

=== Reproduction ===
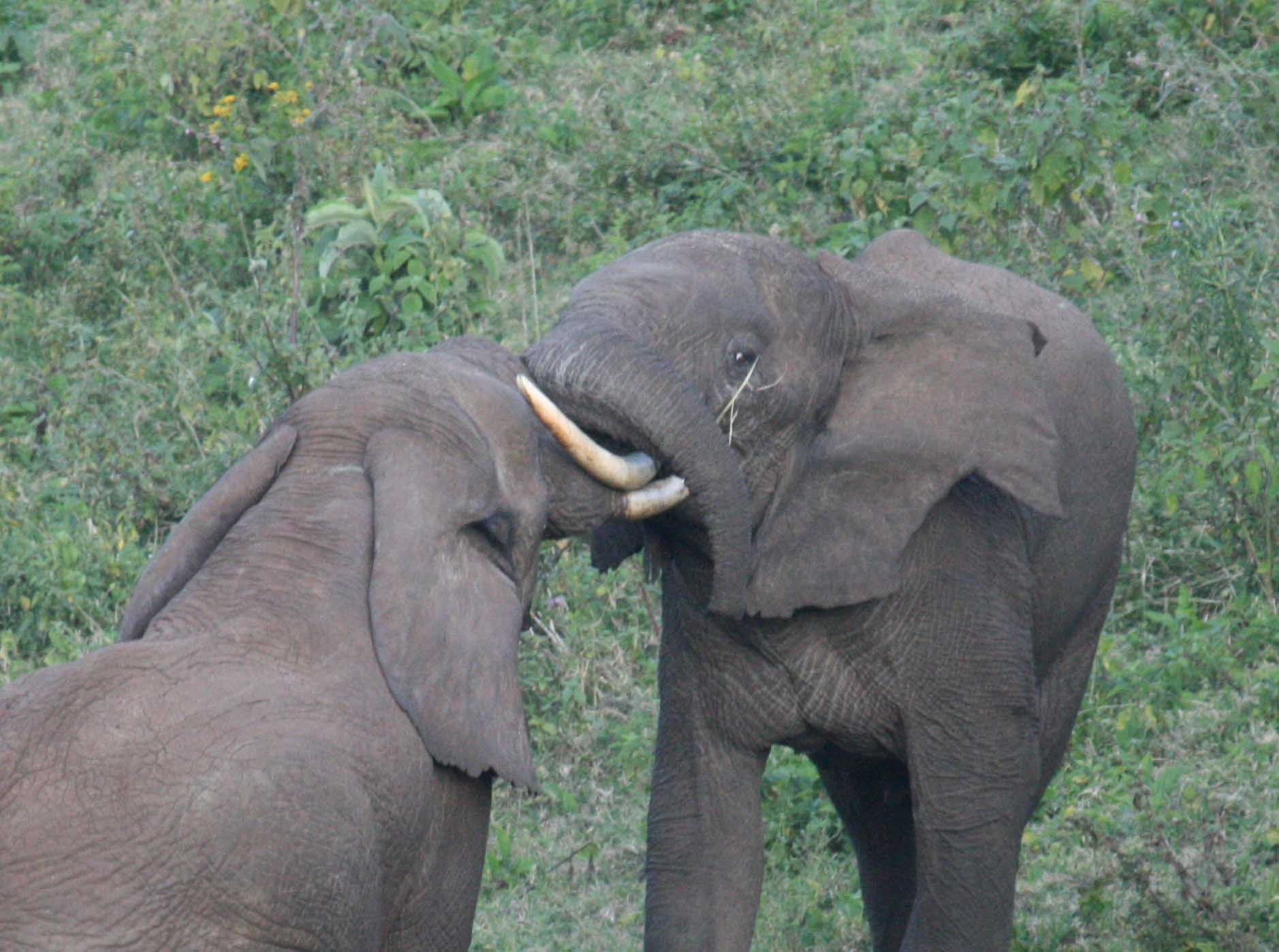
Bull elephants in mock aggression

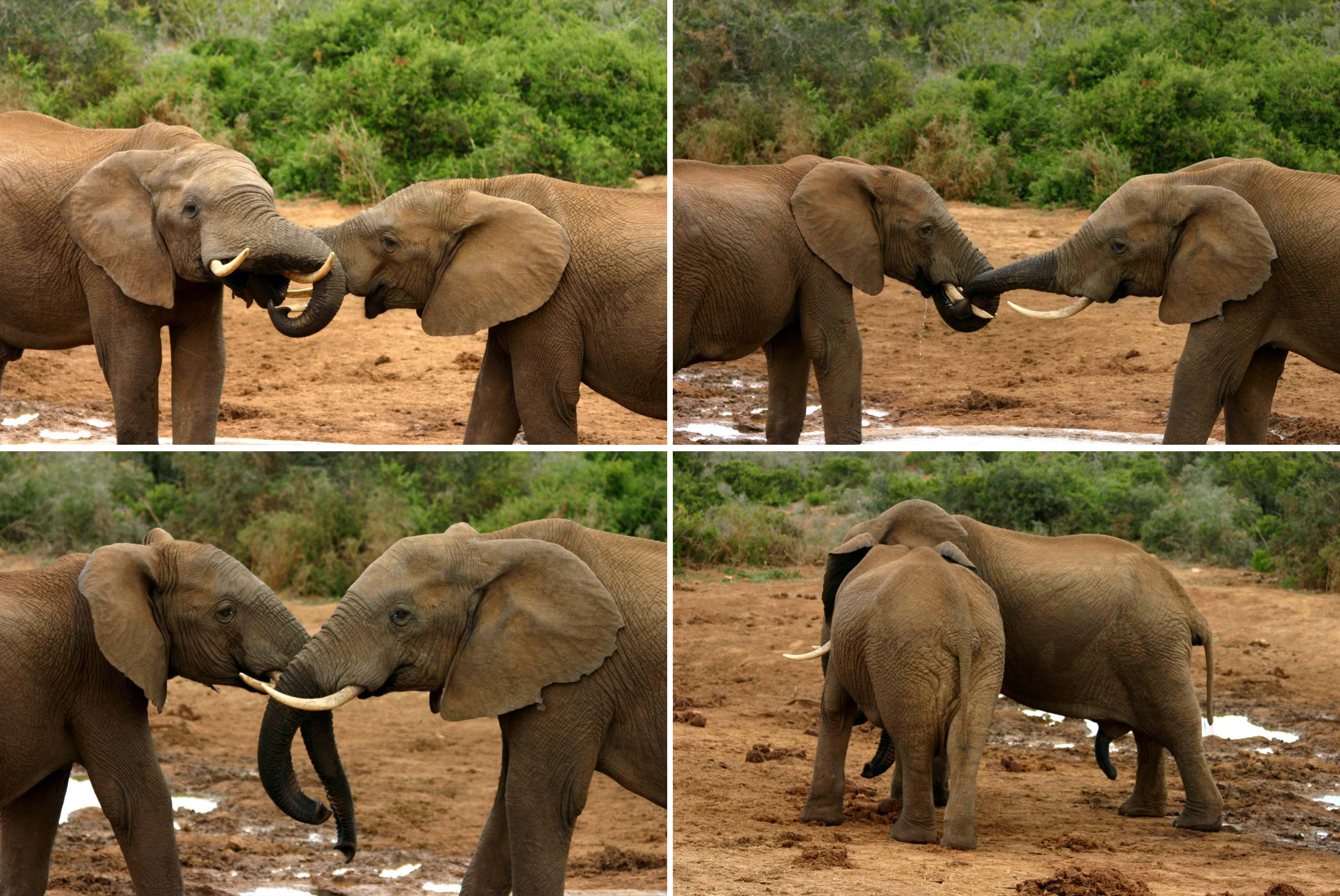
Mating ritual

African elephants are at their most fertile between the ages of 25 and 45 years. Calves are normally born after a gestation period of 22 months. The calves are cared for by their mother and other young females in the group, known as allomothering. Female African elephants are able to start reproducing at around 10 to 12 years of age.

Post sexual maturity, males begin to experience musth, a physical and behavioral condition that is characterized by elevated testosterone, aggression and more sexual activity. Musth also serves a purpose of calling attention to the females that they are of good quality, and it cannot be mimicked as certain calls or noises may be. Males sire few offspring in periods when they are not in musth. During the middle of estrus, female elephants look for males in musth to guard them. The females will yell, in a loud, low way to attract males from far away. Male elephants can also smell the hormones of a female ready for breeding. This leads males to compete with each other to mate, which results in the females mating with older, healthier males. Females choose to a point who they mate with, since they are the ones who try to get males to compete to guard them. However, females are not guarded in the early and late stages of estrus, which may permit mating by younger males not in musth.

Males over the age of 25 compete strongly for females in estrus, and are more successful the larger and more aggressive they are. Bigger males tend to sire bigger offspring. Wild males begin breeding in their thirties when they are at a size and weight that is competitive with other adult males. Male reproductive success is maximal in mid-adulthood and then begins to decline. However, this can depend on the ranking of the male within their group, as higher-ranking males maintain a higher rate of reproduction. Most observed matings are by males in musth over 35 years of age. Twenty-two long observations showed that age and musth are extremely important factors; "… older males had markedly elevated paternity success compared with younger males, suggesting the possibility of sexual selection for longevity in this species."

== Threats ==
Number of African elephants

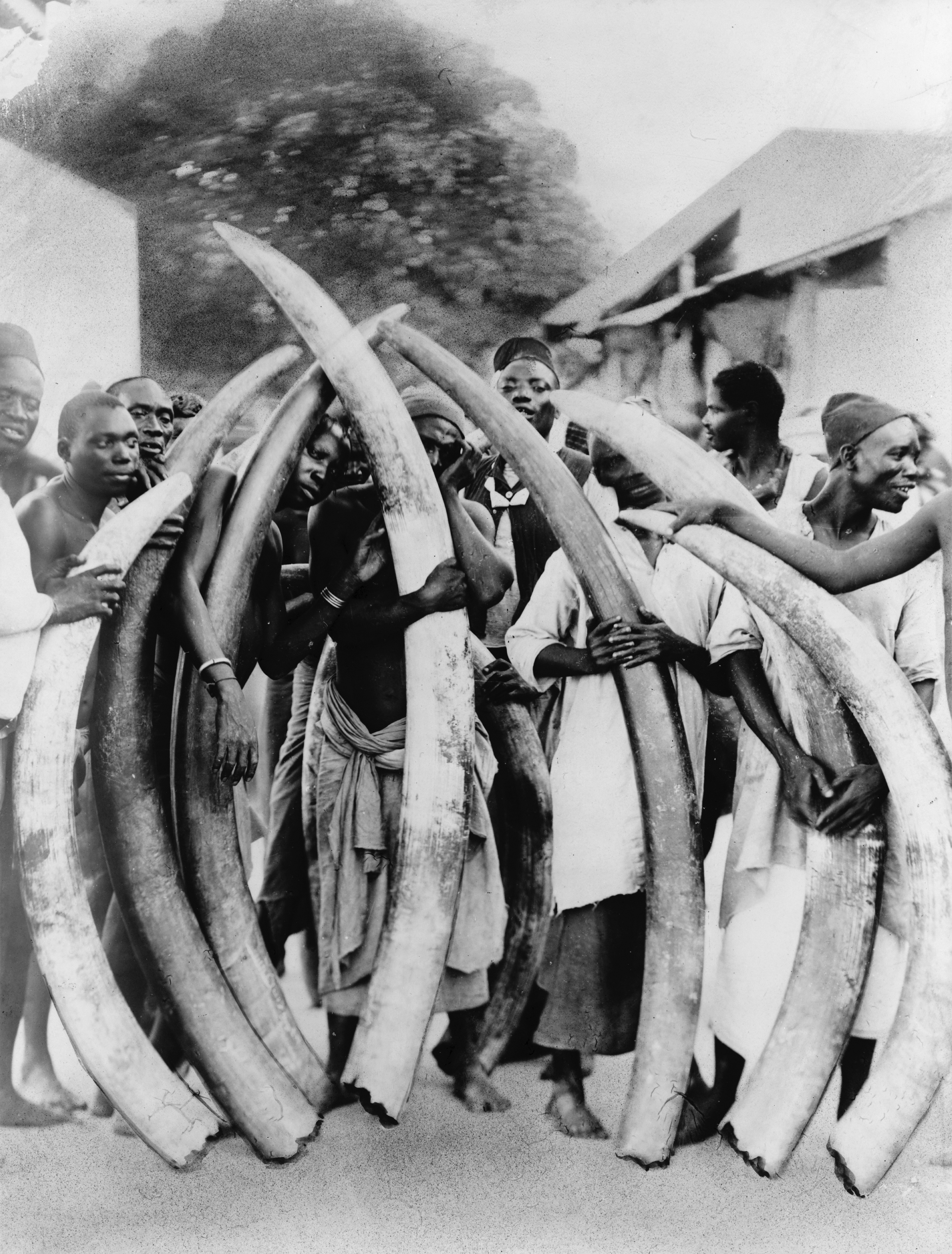
Men with African elephant tusks in Dar es Salaam, c. 1900

Both species are threatened by habitat loss and fragmentation. Poaching for the illegal ivory trade is a threat in several range countries as well. The African bush elephant is listed as Endangered and the African forest elephant as Critically Endangered on the respective IUCN Red Lists.

Based on vegetation types that provide suitable habitat for African elephants, it was estimated that in the early 19th century a maximum of 26,913,000 African elephants might have been present from the Sahel in the north to the Highveld in the south. Decrease of suitable habitat was the major cause for the decline of elephant populations until the 1950s. Hunting African elephants for the ivory trade accelerated the decline from the 1970s onwards. The carrying capacity of remaining suitable habitats was estimated at 8,985,000 elephants at most by 1987. In the 1970s and 1980s, the price of ivory rose, and poaching for ivory increased, particularly in Central African range countries where access to elephant habitats was facilitated by logging and petroleum mining industries. Between 1976 and 1980, about 830 t (820 long tons; 910 short tons) raw ivory was exported from Africa to Hong Kong and Japan, equivalent to tusks of about 222,000 African elephants.

The first continental elephant census was carried out in 1976. At the time, 1.34 million elephants were estimated to range over 7,300,000 km^{2} (2,800,000 sq mi). In the 1980s, it was difficult to carry out systematic surveys in several East African range countries due to civil wars. In 1987, it was estimated that the African elephant population had declined to 760,000 individuals. In 1989, only 608,000 African elephants were estimated to have survived. In 1989, the Kenyan Wildlife Service burned a stockpile of tusks in protest against the ivory trade.

When the international ivory trade reopened in 2006, the demand and price for ivory increased in Asia. In Chad's Zakouma National Park, more than 3,200 elephants were killed between 2005 and 2010. The park did not have sufficient guards to combat poaching and their weapons were outdated. Well organized networks facilitated smuggling the ivory through Sudan. The government of Tanzania estimated that more than 85,000 elephants were lost to poaching in Tanzania between 2009 and 2014, representing a 60% loss. In 2012, a large upsurge in ivory poaching was reported, with about 70% of the product flowing to China. China was the biggest market for poached ivory but announced that it would phase out the legal domestic manufacture and sale of ivory products in May 2015.

Conflicts between elephants and a growing human population are a major issue in elephant conservation. Human encroachment into natural areas where bush elephants occur or their increasing presence in adjacent areas has spurred research into methods of safely driving groups of elephants away from humans. Playback of the recorded sounds of angry Western honey bees has been found to be remarkably effective at prompting elephants to flee an area. Farmers have tried scaring elephants away by more aggressive means such as fire or the use of chili peppers along fences to protect their crops.

The main threats to African elephants are habitat loss and poaching, in addition to these main, most concerning threats, more recent threats emerged which includes human-made barriers and landscape modification which significantly affect and limits African elephant movement and distribution. Construction of fences, roads, artificial water points, and agricultural lands have reported severe impact in altering natural movement patterns, fragmenting habitats, and limiting access to seasonal resources. These artificial disruptions may lead the African elephants to experience increased competition as resources and confined areas are finite and would lead to intensifying human - elephant conflict as elephants are forced to enlarge their territories towards or close to agricultural landscapes and human colonized lands.

== Conservation ==
In 1986, the African Elephant Database was initiated with the aim to monitor the status of African elephant populations. This database includes results from aerial surveys, dung counts, interviews with local people and data on poaching.

In 1989, the Convention on International Trade in Endangered Species of Wild Fauna and Flora listed the African elephant on CITES Appendix I. This listing banned international trade of African elephants and their body parts by countries that signed the CITES agreement. Hunting elephants is banned in the Central African Republic, Democratic Republic of Congo, Gabon, Côte d'Ivoire, and Senegal. After the ban came into force in 1990, retail sales of ivory carvings in South Africa have plummeted by more than 95% within 10 years. As a result of the trade ban, African elephant populations recovered in Southern African range countries.

The African Elephant Specialist Group has set up a Human-Elephant Conflict Task Force with the aim to develop conflict mitigation strategies.

In 2005, the West African Elephant Memorandum of Understanding was signed by 12 West African countries. The Convention on the Conservation of Migratory Species of Wild Animals provided financial support for four years to implement the West African Elephant Conservation Strategy, which forms the central component of this intergovernmental treaty.

In 2019, the export of wild African elephants to zoos around the world was banned, with an exception added by the EU to allow export in "exceptional cases where … it is considered that a transfer to ex-situ locations will provide demonstrable in-situ conservation benefits for African elephants". Previously, export had been allowed in Southern Africa with Zimbabwe capturing and exporting more than 100 baby elephants to Chinese zoos since 2012.

It was found that elephant conservation does not pose a trade-off with climate change mitigation. Although animals typically cause a reduction of woody biomass and therewith above-ground carbon, they foster soil carbon sequestration.

=== Conservation strategies ===
Recent conservation approaches for African elephants are more focused on territorial-level management and the maintenance of ecological connectivity between fragmented areas where artificial causes are the main factor influencing African elephant population. By interpreting on migration corridors and by sustaining connection between protected areas, it would support natural movement patterns and balanced access to seasonal resources. Conservation strategies will include efforts to weaken the impacts of human infrastructure such as removal of fences and improved land use planning which would propose to reduce habitat fragmentation and human elephant conflict. Additional factors which would reinforce African elephant conservation includes coordinated international management as elephant territories are distributed broadly across the Africa plains and safari regions, and the integration of local communities into conservation planning.

== In culture ==
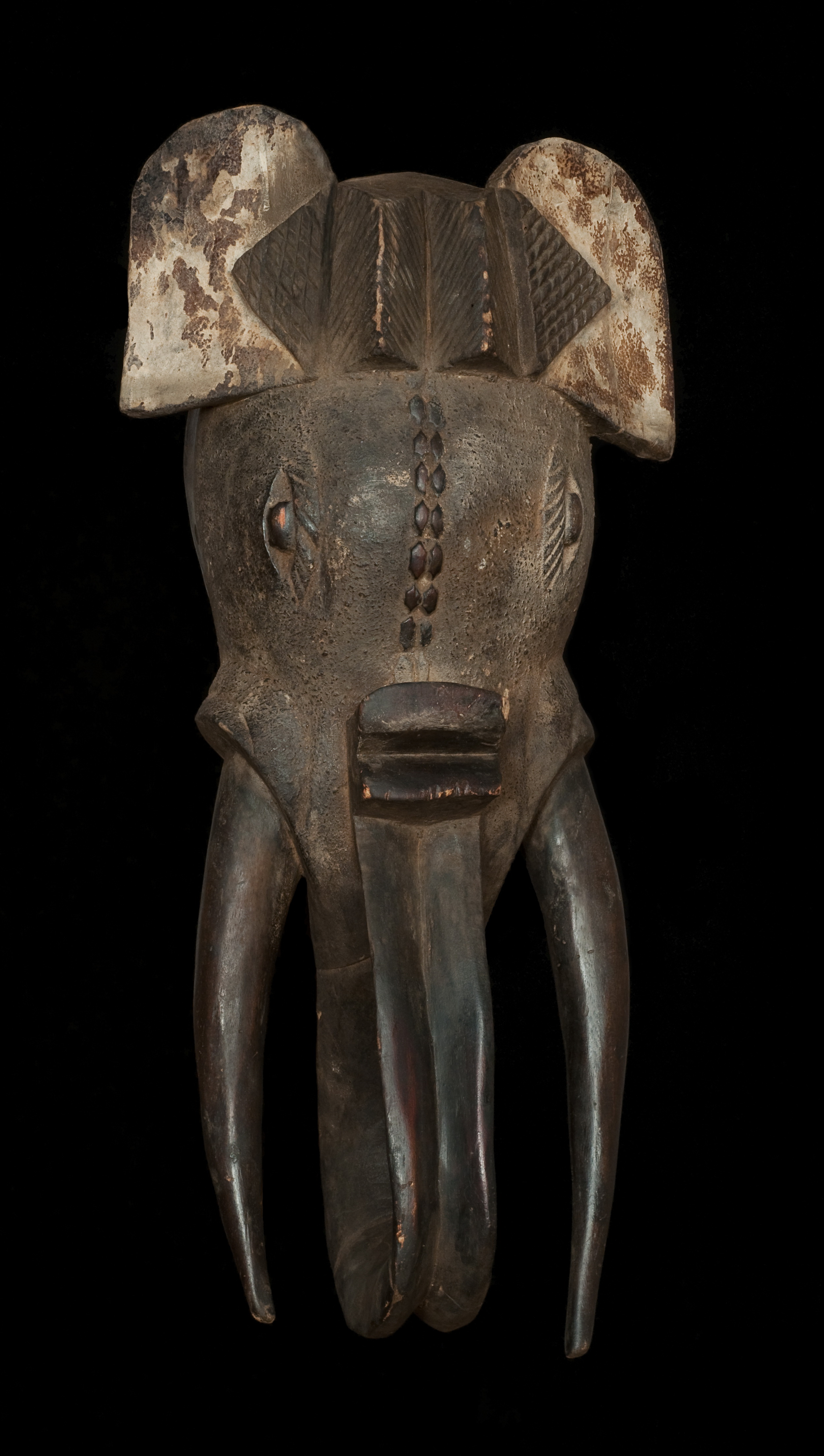
Elephant mask in the Ivory Coast

Many African cultures revere the elephant as a symbol of strength and power. It is also praised for its size, longevity, stamina, mental faculties, cooperative spirit, and loyalty. Its religious importance is mostly totemic. Many societies believed that their chiefs would be reincarnated as elephants. In the 10th century, the people of Igbo-Ukwu in Nigeria buried their leaders with elephant tusks.

South Africa uses elephant tusks in their coat of arms to represent wisdom, strength, moderation and eternity.

In the western African Kingdom of Dahomey (now Benin), the elephant was associated with the 19th century rulers of the Fon people, Guezo and his son Glele. (Note: Guezo and Glele ruled from 1818 to 1858 and from 1858 to 1889, respectively) The animal is believed to evoke strength, royal legacy, and enduring memory as related by the proverbs: "There where the elephant passes in the forest, one knows" and "The animal steps on the ground, but the elephant steps down with strength." Their flag depicted an elephant wearing a royal crown.

=== As national symbols ===
The coat of arms of the Central African Republic features the head of an elephant in the upper left quadrant of the shield. The version of the coat of arms of Guinea used from 1958 to 1984 featured a golden elephant in the centre of the shield. The coat of arms of Ivory Coast features the head of an elephant as the focal point of the emblem. The coat of arms of the Republic of the Congo has two elephants supporting the shield. The coat of arms of Eswatini has an elephant and a lion supporting the shield.

== See also ==
- Africa's Elephant Kingdom
- List of individual elephants
