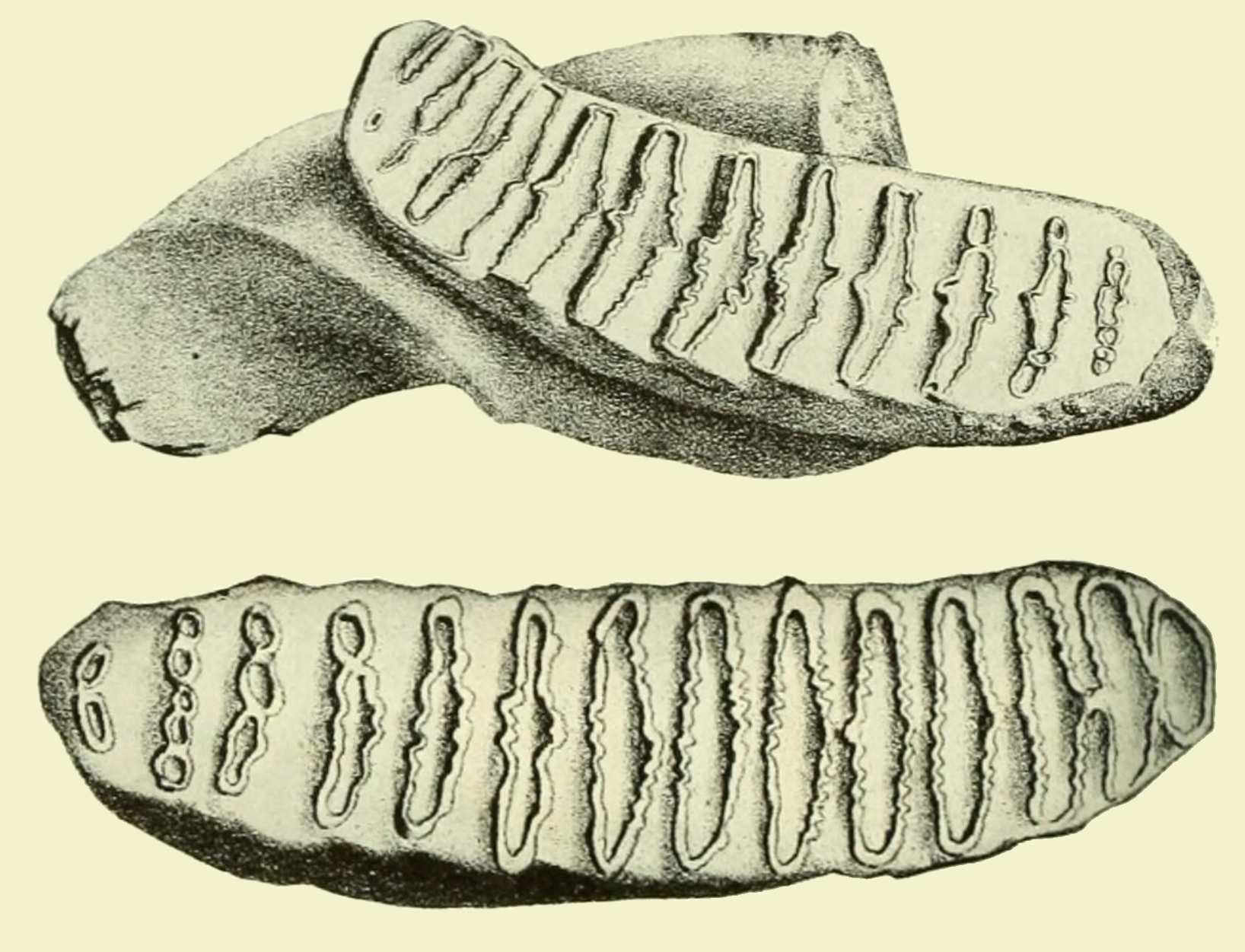

Scientific classification
- Kingdom: Animalia
- Phylum: Chordata
- Class: Mammalia
- Order: Proboscidea
- Family: Elephantidae
- Genus: Loxodonta
- Species: †L. atlantica

Binomial name
- †Loxodonta atlantica Pomel, 1879

= Loxodonta atlantica =

Loxodonta atlantica Temporal range: Late Pliocene to Middle Pleistocene

Extinct species of mammal

Loxodonta atlantica is an extinct species of elephant in the genus Loxodonta (which includes living African elephants). It was larger than modern African elephants, with more progressive dentition. It includes Pleistocene fossils from Ternifine, Algeria, Middle Pleistocene fossils from Elandsfontein, South Africa and Late Pliocene fossils from the Omo River, Ethiopia. It is suggested to have an extinction date of around 400,000 years ago, during the Middle Pleistocene. L. atlantica has been suggested to have probably derived from L. adaurora; or L. exoptata. It is likely ancestral to the living African bush elephant, L. africana, with which it coexisted during the Middle Pleistocene prior to its extinction. The species is divided into two subspecies: L. atlantica atlantica (northern Africa) and L. atlantica zulu (southern Africa). The type for Loxodonta atlantica is housed in the Muséum national d'histoire naturelle in Paris, but is listed without a specimen number.
