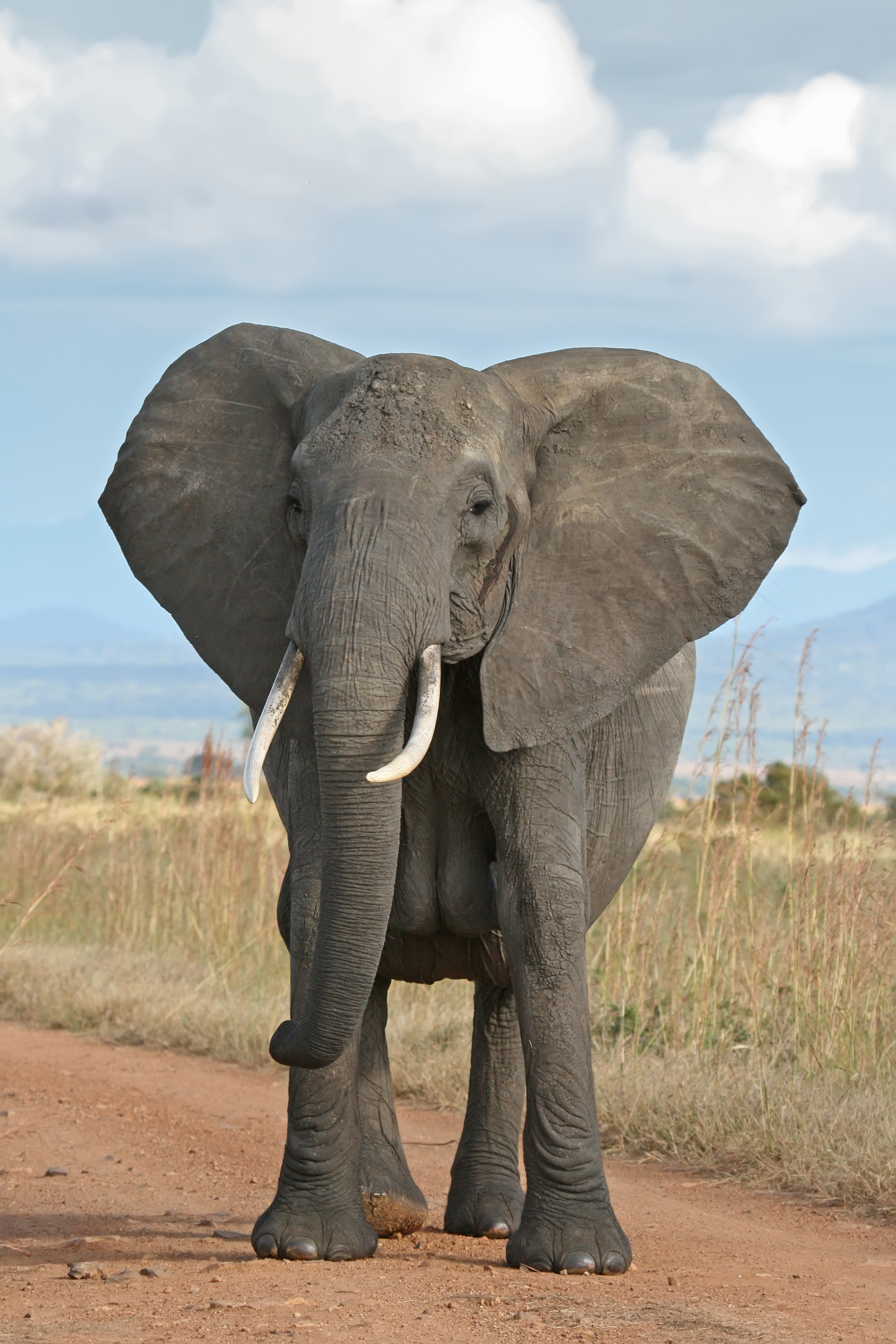
- Female African Bush Elephant

Scientific classification
- Kingdom: Animalia
- Phylum: Chordata
- Class: Mammalia
- Order: Proboscidea
- Family: Elephantidae
- Genus: Loxodonta
- Species: †L. exoptata

Binomial name
- †Loxodonta exoptata (Dietrich, 1941)

= Loxodonta exoptata =

Loxodonta exoptata Temporal range: Pliocene

Extinct species of mammal

Loxodonta exoptata is an extinct species of elephant in the genus Loxodonta, from Africa. A 2009 study suggested that Loxodonta exoptata gave rise to L. atlantica, which gave rise to L. africana. The molars of L. exoptata are distinguished from later loxodonts by the lower plate number and their specialized enamel loops. Fossil remains of L. exoptata have been found at Pliocene sites in eastern Africa including Hadar, Laetoli and Koobi Fora.
